= Mark Pittman =

American journalist (1957–2009)

- Born: James Mark Pittman
- Education: University of Kansas
- Occupation: Financial journalist
- Years active: 1982-2009
- Employer: Bloomberg News
- Known for: First person to sue the Federal Reserve
- Spouse: Laura Fahrenthold
- Children: Three children
- Awards: 2008 Gerald Loeb Award; 2009 George Polk Award; 2010 Hillman Prize

James Mark Pittman (October 25, 1957 - November 25, 2009) was a financial journalist covering corporate finance and derivative markets. He was awarded several prestigious journalism awards, the Gerald Loeb Award, the George Polk Award, a New York Press Club award, the Hillman Prize and several New York Associated Press awards.

== Biographical details ==
Pittman was born in Kansas City, Kansas. Standing 6 feet 4 inches (1.93 m), he was a linebacker and first baseman on his high school teams.

After attending engineering classes, he graduated in 1981 with a degree in journalism from the University of Kansas in Lawrence, Kansas. He has a daughter, Maggie, from his first marriage.

He met his second wife, Laura Fahrenthold of Rochester, New York, also a journalist, in 1994. Five years after moving to Yonkers from Brooklyn, they opened an art gallery there in 2005. The name of the gallery, Y.O.H. Gallery, which stood for "Yonkers on Hudson", was an attempt to blend the city's urban culture with phrasing suggestive of more affluent towns on the Hudson further north.

Pittman suffered a fatal heart attack in November, 2009. His wife spent four summers spreading his ashes on 31,000 miles of cross country/Canada RV trips with their two daughters. Her love story/memoir, THE PINK STEERING WHEEL CHRONICLES, was published released in June 2018 by Hatherleigh Press/Penguin Random House.

== Career ==
Pittman started out as a police-beat reporter for the Coffeyville Journal in Coffeyville, Kansas before moving to Rochester, where he worked for a year at the Democrat & Chronicle. From 1985 to 1997, he worked as a reporter, editor and bureau chief at the Times Herald-Record in Middletown, New York. He had a reputation there for being intimidating, relentless, funny and brilliant. He joined Bloomberg News in 1997, where he wrote about finance, private equity, mergers and acquisitions, energy markets, politics and economics.

Commenting on Pittman's sense of humor, Congressman Brad Miller wrote in the Huffington Post.

What made it so entertaining to talk with him was his irreverence for the financial industry, which was a refreshing contrast to the industry's self-reverence. He didn't have an angry, confrontational 'Speak Truth To Power!' attitude towards the industry; he just saw them as grifters. Mark didn't see much difference between selling AAA-rated bonds backed by subprime mortgages and sending e-mails claiming to be African royalty in need of help transferring a fortune to a U.S. bank, and he was amused by the financial industry's pretensions that they were making a great contribution to our economy.

— Congressman Brad Miller

== 2008 financial crisis ==
In the summer of 2007, Pittman wrote stories predicting the collapse of the banking system. His article "S&P, Moody’s Hide Rising Risk on $200 Billion of Mortgage Bonds" was excoriated by Portfolio.com in an unsigned post, which was later reversed in a signed apology. He was instead praised for "doing the kind of provocative journalism that treads new ground and rings alarms."

Pittman said that his early experience dealing with police gave him a "big BS detector" because he was lied to so much by the police, the victims, and those helping the victims. He had to sort through all the lies to get to the real story, which was different from the one he was being told. One journalist and friend called Pittman's style of reporting "Hypocrisy laid bare; it’s simple accountability reporting, albeit done with a high degree of technical skill."

In 2008, he was part of the team that won a Gerald Loeb Award in the News Service category for a five-part series called "Wall Street's Faustian Bargain." The Loeb award is the highest accolade in financial journalism. Pittman's lead story, called “Subprime Securities Market Began as 'Group of 5' Over Chinese” explained how precarious the financial markets were, that if a mere 5% of U.S. mortgage borrowers missed their monthly payments, it could lead to a worldwide freeze in lending.

Pittman broke a number of major financial stories, including that of how Goldman Sachs, Merrill Lynch, Morgan Stanley, Deutsche Bank and others gained from the bailout of AIG. He also broke the story about former Treasury Secretary Henry Paulson's involvement in creating the subprime mortgage crisis when he was CEO of Goldman Sachs.

== Sues Federal Reserve ==
Around September – October 2008, as the financial meltdown was taking place, Pittman and his Bloomberg colleagues, including Bob Ivry, were covering the bailout story as it was happening and they started wondering what they could do to show the big picture. They took a whiteboard and began to list all the emergency and lending programs that were being guaranteed to the banks. They discovered the amount going to prop up the financial system dwarfed the $700 billion Troubled Asset Relief Program (TARP). It added up to $12.8 trillion (Note: One trillion is a one with twelve zeros. Most calculators cannot display the number because it has 13 digits and most calculators only allow ten.) and it wasn't clear in all cases where the money was going. The Federal Reserve alone had programs adding up to $7.7 trillion, including the bailouts of Citigroup and AIG. The Treasury had an additional $2.7 trillion, including the $700 billion for TARP, $24 billion in tax breaks for banks, the $168 billion Bush stimulus and the $787 billion Obama stimulus packages. The Federal Deposit Insurance Corporation (FDIC) had another $2 trillion in programs. Not all the money was spent, but much was in guarantees to the banks at taxpayer expense, against future losses so the banks wouldn't fail.

A number of the programs at the Federal Reserve were unclear as to who was getting funds and what sort of collateral the government was getting in return for the loans. Pittman decided he wanted to find out who was borrowing from the Federal Reserve, how much they were borrowing and what kind of collateral the Fed was getting in return. He filed a Freedom of Information Act (FOIA) request to gain records about taxpayer-financed policies that were being withheld from the public, to wit, where the Fed had lent 2 trillion taxpayer dollars and what it was getting in return. The Fed denied the request, he appealed and they denied it again.

Saying "It's not Ben Bernanke's money, it's our money", Pittman then decided to sue the Fed in federal court, making headlines as the first person to ever sue the Federal Reserve. Pittman and his colleague Craig Torres filed the suit in conjunction with Bloomberg News. On August 24, 2009, Judge Loretta A. Preska ruled the Fed had "improperly withheld" the information and gave it five days to turn the information over to Bloomberg. The Fed was rebuffed twice in appellate court, but on August 27, 2010, the U.S. Court of Appeals granted the Fed's request to delay implementation of the ruling until October 19 so it may appeal to the Supreme Court.

In September 2009, after the initial ruling in Bloomberg's favor, the Clearing House Association, LLC, a group of 20 of the largest commercial banks, joined the lawsuit. It filed an appeal to the Supreme Court on October 26, 2010, but the Fed did not join the appeal. Several news organizations have filed amicus briefs in support of Bloomberg. As of March 2011, though Pittman has since died, The U.S. Court of Appeals in Manhattan ruled on March 19, 2010, that the Fed must release records of the unprecedented $2 trillion U.S. loan program launched primarily after the 2008 collapse of Lehman Brothers Holdings Inc. The ruling upholds a decision of a lower-court judge, who in August ordered that the information be released.

== Documentary film American Casino ==
His efforts drew the attention of Leslie and Andrew Cockburn, who then featured him prominently in their documentary about the collapse of the subprime market. The title of the unnarrated film, American Casino, comes from something Pittman says in the beginning of the film. It begins with a dissection of bank deregulation, largely by Pittman, and continues with a "thriller-like exposition" of the precarious financial boom built on new homeowners, often minorities, who were charged hidden escrow costs in documents they didn't understand.

== Recognition and awards ==
Nobel Prize winner and economist Joseph Stiglitz called Pittman "one of the great financial journalists of our time.” Pulitzer Prize winning financial journalist Gretchen Morgenson called him "a giant", saying that "His investigative work during the crisis set the standard for other reporters everywhere." A former critic, Felix Salmon, wrote, "His loss to the profession is irreplaceable." Pittman was the recipient of numerous awards for his work.

- Six New York State Associated Press awards on subjects ranging from an investigation into the deaths of nine children in an elementary school building collapse to coverage of the 25th anniversary of the Woodstock Festival
- 2008 Gerald Loeb Award for News Services for "Wall Street's Faustian Bargain"
- 2009 George Polk Award
- 2009 New York Press Club Journalism Award for newsradio, "Fed Defies Transparency"
- 2010 National Headliner Award for business news coverage, "Lehman's Lessons" (first place)
- 2010 Hillman Prize for newspaper journalism, "The Fight for Transparency"

== Selected articles ==
- Mark Pittman, "Paulson's Focus on 'Excesses' Shows Goldman Gorged (Update1)" Bloomberg News (November 5, 2007). Retrieved March 8, 2011
- Pittman, Mark; Ivry, Bob; Kodjak, Alison (2008-11-10). "Fed Defies Transparency Aim in Refusal to Disclose (Update2)". Bloomberg News.
- Mark Pittman, "Subprime Securities Market Began as 'Group of 5' Over Chinese" Bloomberg News (December 17, 2007). Gerald Loeb Award winning article
- Mark Pittman, "Goldman, Merrill Collect Billions After Fed's AIG Bailout Loans" Bloomberg News (September 29, 2008). Retrieved March 8, 2011

== See also ==
- List of George Polk Award Winners
- Alison Kodjak, a colleague at Bloomberg News
- Gary J. Aguirre, lawyer who predicted the 2008 financial crisis and filed an FOIA suit against the U.S. Securities and Exchange Commission
- Griftopia, Matt Taibbi's book about the 2008 financial crisis
- Regulatory capture
- Term Asset-Backed Securities Loan Facility, Federal Reserve program
