= Catherine Isabella Osborne =

Irish artist and patron (1818–1880)

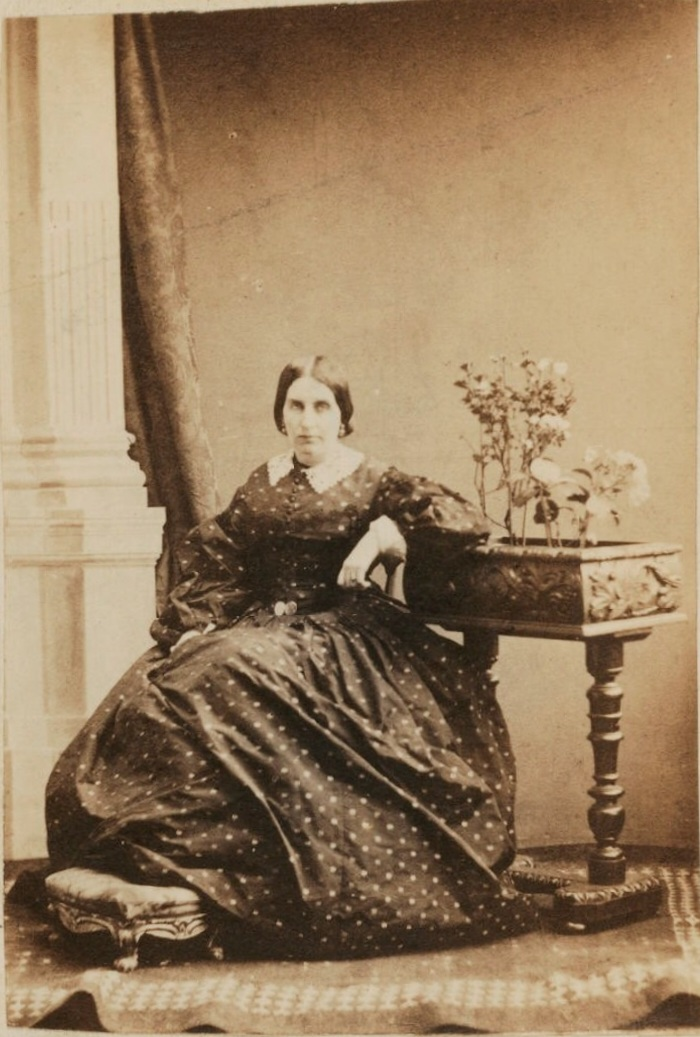
- Formal portrait, 1860
- Born: Catherine Isabella Osborne; 30 June 1818; Newtown Anner House, Clonmel, Ireland
- Died: 21 June 1880 (aged 61); Newtown Anner House, Clonmel, Ireland
- Resting place: Killaloan church
- Notable work: False Positions (1863)
- Spouse: Ralph Bernal (m. 1844)
- Children: 2, including Edith Blake
- Parent(s): Sir Thomas Osborne; Catherine Rebecca Osborne

Catherine Isabella Osborne (30 June 1818 – 21 June 1880) was an Irish artist, writer and patron.

== Life ==
Catherine Isabella Osborne was born at Newtown Anner House, near Clonmel, County Tipperary on 30 June 1818. The second child, she was the only daughter of Sir Thomas Osborne and Catherine Rebecca Osborne (née Smith). Sir Thomas was a prominent landowner in south County Tipperary and County Waterford, and served as MP for Carysfort, County Wicklow from 1776 to 1797. Catherine Rebecca Osborne was born in England, possibly Kent, and was a very religious woman. Osborne's only brother William died in May 1824 aged 8, which left her the sole heir to the Osborne estate, with her uncle receiving the baronetcy.

Osborne was noted for keeping an entertaining, lively and cultivated house, playing host to artists such as Thomas Shotter Boys and Alexandre Calame. Boys exhibited a painting he completed at Newtown Anner in 1865, which is his only known Irish watercolour. Osborne was an early patron of Calame, and is believed to have employed him to give her daughters guidance in painting. She was interested in photography, with William Despard Hemphill dedicating his collection of published photographs of Clonmel to her in 1860 following her support. Osborne was a talented artist, producing a series of sketchbooks of Irish and English country houses. These are now held in the family home of her daughter in Myrtle Grove, Youghal. She edited and published two volumes of her mother's letters in 1870, Memorials of the life and character of Lady Osborne. Osborne financed the library at Knockmahon in County Waterford. She died at Newtown Anner on 21 June 1880, and is buried at Killaloan church in the family vault.

== Family ==
Osborne met Ralph Bernal in London in 1844, at the residence of Lady Sydney Morgan. Before the couple were married on 20 August 1844, Bernal took the name Osborne, his name becoming Ralph Bernal Osborne.

It would appear that the marriage was not a happy one, and Bernal Osborne spent much of his time in London pursuing a political career at Westminster. In 1863, Osborne published a novel anonymously, False Positions, which is described as a "thinly disguised attack" on her husband. Osborne stayed at Newtown Anner to raise the couple's two daughters, Edith and Grace. Edith married Henry Arthur Blake, against her parents wishes, and was styled Lady Blake. Grace went on to be the second wife of William Beauclerk, 10th Duke of St Albans.
