= Ralph Bernal Osborne =

British politician (1808–1882)

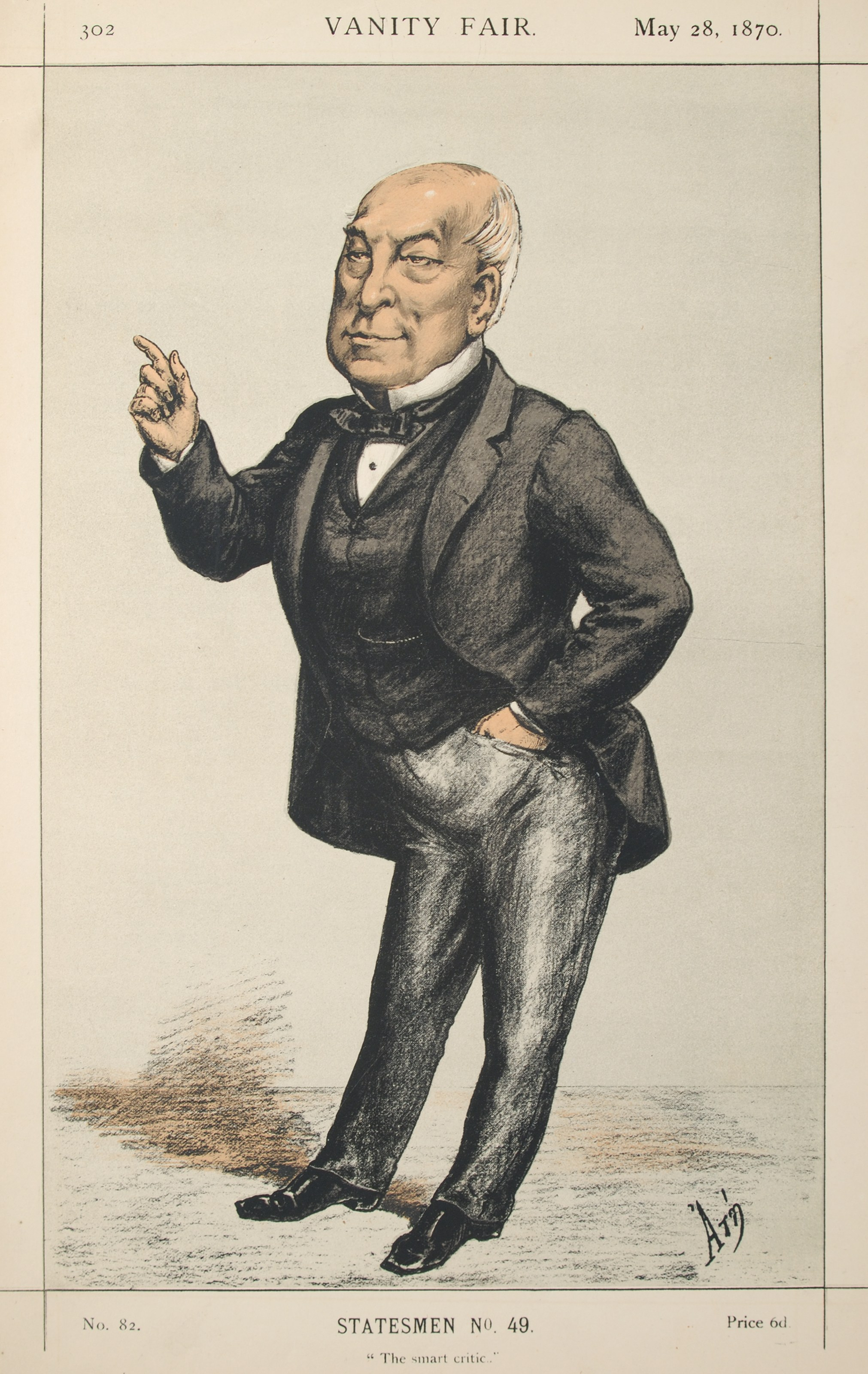
- Caricature by ATn published in Vanity Fair in 1870

First Secretary of the Admiralty
- In office 1853–1858
- Preceded by: Augustus Stafford
- Succeeded by: Henry Lowry-Corry

Personal details
- Born: Ralph Bernal; 26 March 1808 London, England
- Died: 4 January 1882 (aged 73) Bestwood Lodge, St Albans, Nottinghamshire, England
- Spouse: Catherine Isabella Osborne (m. 1844; died 1880)
- Children: 2, including Edith
- Parent: Ralph Bernal (father)
- Relatives: Henry Arthur Blake (son-in-law); Osborne Beauclerk, 12th Duke of St Albans (grandson)

Ralph Bernal Osborne (né Bernal; 26 March 1808 – 4 January 1882) was a British Liberal politician and army officer who served as a Member of Parliament (MP) under multiple constituencies from 1841 to 1874. The son of Whig politician Ralph Bernal, he is referred to as The Younger Bernal to avoid confusion with his father.

== Early life ==
Ralph Bernal was born on 26 March 1808 in London. He was the eldest son of two children born to future Whig MP Ralph Bernal (1783/84–1854) and his first wife Ann Elizabeth Bernal (née White; 1787–1823). From his father's side, Bernal was of Sephardic Jewish Iberian descent, with his ancestors living in several cities in Spain and Portugal before fleeing following the Jewish expulsion from the two countries in 1492, and thus fled to Amsterdam in the Netherlands before settling in London.

His paternal grandparents were Jacob Israel Bernal Jr., a merchant, and Leah da Silva.

== Career ==
Bernal entered the military in 1831, as an Ensign of the 71st (Highland) Regiment of Foot. He later served with the 7th (Royal Fusiliers) Regiment of Foot, and finally left the army in 1844 with the rank of Captain.

He had already been elected to Parliament in 1841 as a member for Chipping Wycombe, in the Liberal interest, and later sat for Middlesex (1847–1857), Dover (1857–1859), Liskeard (1859–1865), Nottingham (1866–1868), and Waterford City (1870–1874).

In the Railway Times of 21 June 1845, he is the first person listed in the provisional committee for the Leicester, Ashby-de-la-Zouch, Burton-upon-Trent and Stafford Junction Railway: Ralph R. Bernal Osborne, MP for Wycombe, address: Albemarle Street. The railway was never built.

Beside being a Parliamentarian, he was also Secretary of the Admiralty.

When he died, his house at Newtown Anner, Clonmel, County Tipperary, Munster, Ireland, was surrounded by more than 13,000 acres (53 km^{2}) of land.

== Personal life ==
On 20 August 1844 he married Catherine Isabella Osborne (1819–1880), from an Anglo-Irish landed family, the daughter of Sir Thomas Osborne, 9th Baronet, and Catherine Rebecca Smith. On the same day of their wedding, he took her name and his name was legally changed by royal licence, becoming Ralph Bernal Osborne. Together, they were the parents of two daughters:

- Edith Bernal Osborne (1846–1926), who married, as his second wife, Sir Henry Arthur Blake, the son of Peter Blake of Corbally Castle, in 1874.
- Grace Bernal Osborne (1848–1926), who married, as his second wife, William Beauclerk, 10th Duke of St Albans, in 1874.

His wife died on 21 June 1880 at Newtown Anner House in County Tipperary. Osborne died on 4 January 1882.

=== Descendants ===
Through his eldest daughter, he was a grandfather of three, Olive Blake (who married John Bernard Arbuthnot), Lt. Arthur Blake, and Maurice Bernal Blake.

Through his younger daughter, he was a grandfather of Osborne Beauclerk, 12th Duke of St Albans, Lady Moyra de Vere Beauclerk (wife of Lord Richard Cavendish, a grandson of the 7th Duke of Devonshire), Lady Katherine de Vere Beauclerk (wife of Henry Somerset, a grandson of the 8th Duke of Beaufort, and secondly, Maj.-Gen. Sir William Lambton, a son of the 2nd Earl of Durham), Lady Alexandra de Vere Beauclerk, and Lord William Huddlestone de Vere Beauclerk, who both died unmarried.

== Sources ==
- Charles Mosley, editor, Burke's Peerage, Baronetage & Knightage, 107th edition, 3 volumes (Wilmington, Delaware, U.S.: Burke's Peerage (Genealogical Books) Ltd, 2003), vol. 2, p. 3031.

Political offices
| Preceded by Augustus Stafford | First Secretary of the Admiralty; 1853–1858 | Succeeded by Henry Lowry-Corry |
Parliament of the United Kingdom
| Preceded by George Robert Smith; Sir George Dashwood, Bt | Member of Parliament for Chipping Wycombe; 1841–1847; With: Sir George Dashwood, Bt | Succeeded by Martin Tucker Smith; Sir George Dashwood, Bt |
| Preceded by Thomas Wood; Lord Robert Grosvenor | Member of Parliament for Middlesex; 1847–1857; With: Lord Robert Grosvenor | Succeeded by Robert Hanbury; Lord Robert Grosvenor |
| Preceded by Edward Royd Rice; Viscount Chelsea | Member of Parliament for Dover; 1857–1859; With: Sir William Russell, Bt | Succeeded by Sir Henry John Leeke; William Nicol |
| Preceded by Ralph Grey | Member of Parliament for Liskeard; 1859–1865 | Succeeded by Sir Arthur Buller |
| Preceded by Sir Robert Clifton, Bt; Samuel Morley | Member of Parliament for Nottingham; 1866–1868; With: Viscount Amberley | Succeeded by Sir Robert Clifton, Bt; Charles Wright |
| Preceded by Sir Henry Barron, Bt; James Delahunty | Member of Parliament for Waterford City; 1870–1874; With: James Delahunty | Succeeded by Richard Power; Purcell O'Gorman |
