= Alison Kodjak =

American journalist

Alison Fitzgerald Kodjak
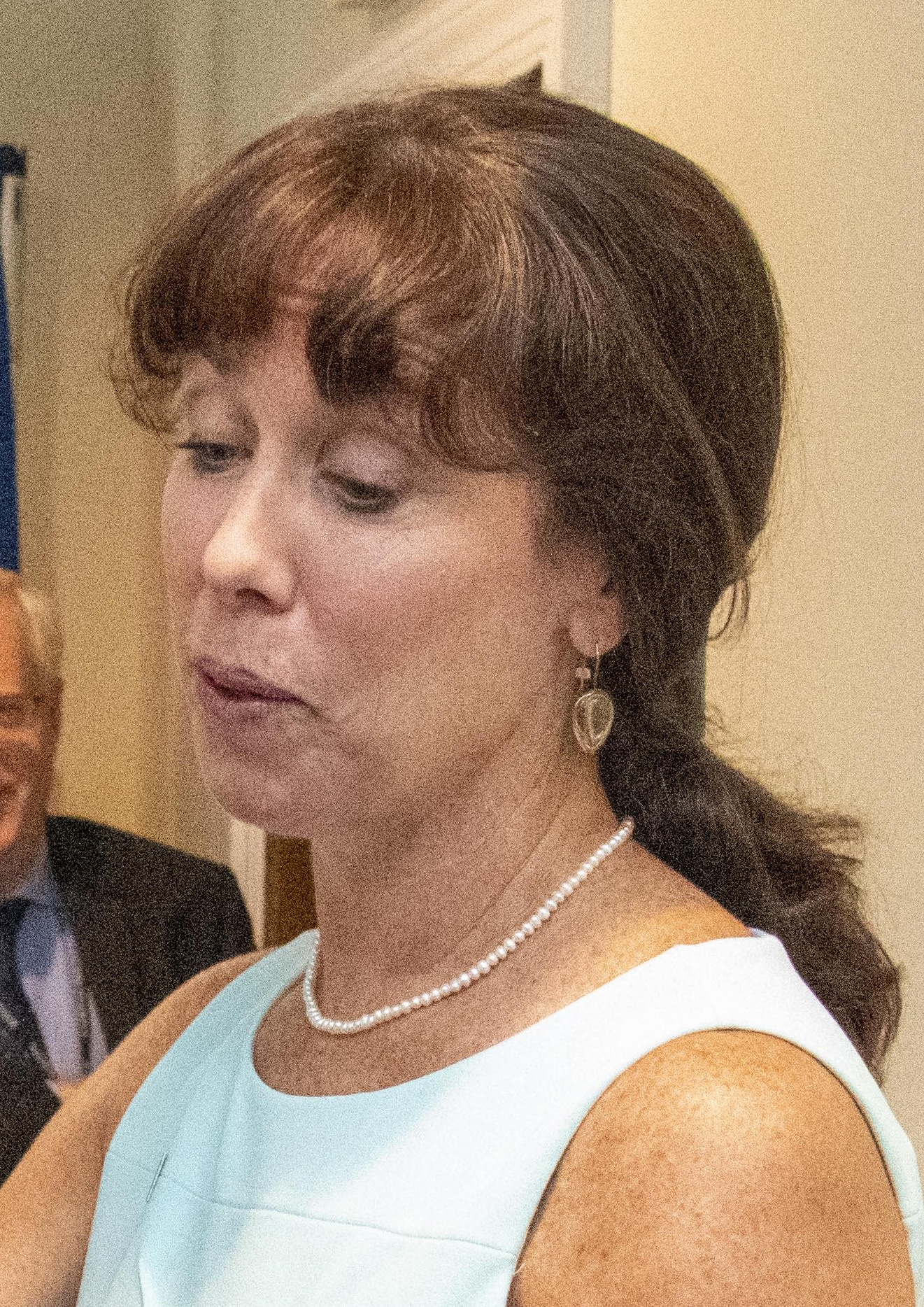
- Alison Kodjak, in 2019
- Born: Alison Fitzgerald
- Education: BA, Georgetown University 1991; MA Northwestern University 1994
- Occupations: journalist; news presenter; reporter and correspondent
- Years active: 1994–present
- Notable work: In Too Deep: BP and the Drilling Race that Brought it Down
- Spouse: Drew Kodjak (m. 2000)
- Children: Nikita, Elijah and Forrest

Alison Fitzgerald Kodjak is an American journalist and currently works for the ProPublica as Assistant Managing Editor for National News. She was previously acting Global Investigations Editor at the Associated Press. She previously reported for the AP from 1997 to 2000. She formerly worked for National Public Radio, where she led the science desk, the Center for Public Integrity, and at Bloomberg News for 10 years, and has also worked as a reporter for newspapers, including The Philadelphia Inquirer. She is a two-time winner of the George Polk Award, one of journalism's most prestigious honors.

== Early life ==
Kodjak attended high school at Milton Academy in Milton, Massachusetts, spending her junior year abroad in France. In her senior year she missed several months of classes due to a bout with leukemia (AML), but succeeded in graduating on schedule with her class after receiving aggressive, newly developed treatment at the Tufts Medical Center Floating Hospital. She attended Georgetown University, graduating with majors in Italian and European Studies in 1991, and the Northwestern University - The Medill School of Journalism in 1994, with specialties in legal and science writing. She also attended the Università degli Studi di Siena in Siena, Tuscany, and is fluent in English, French, and Italian.

== Career in journalism ==
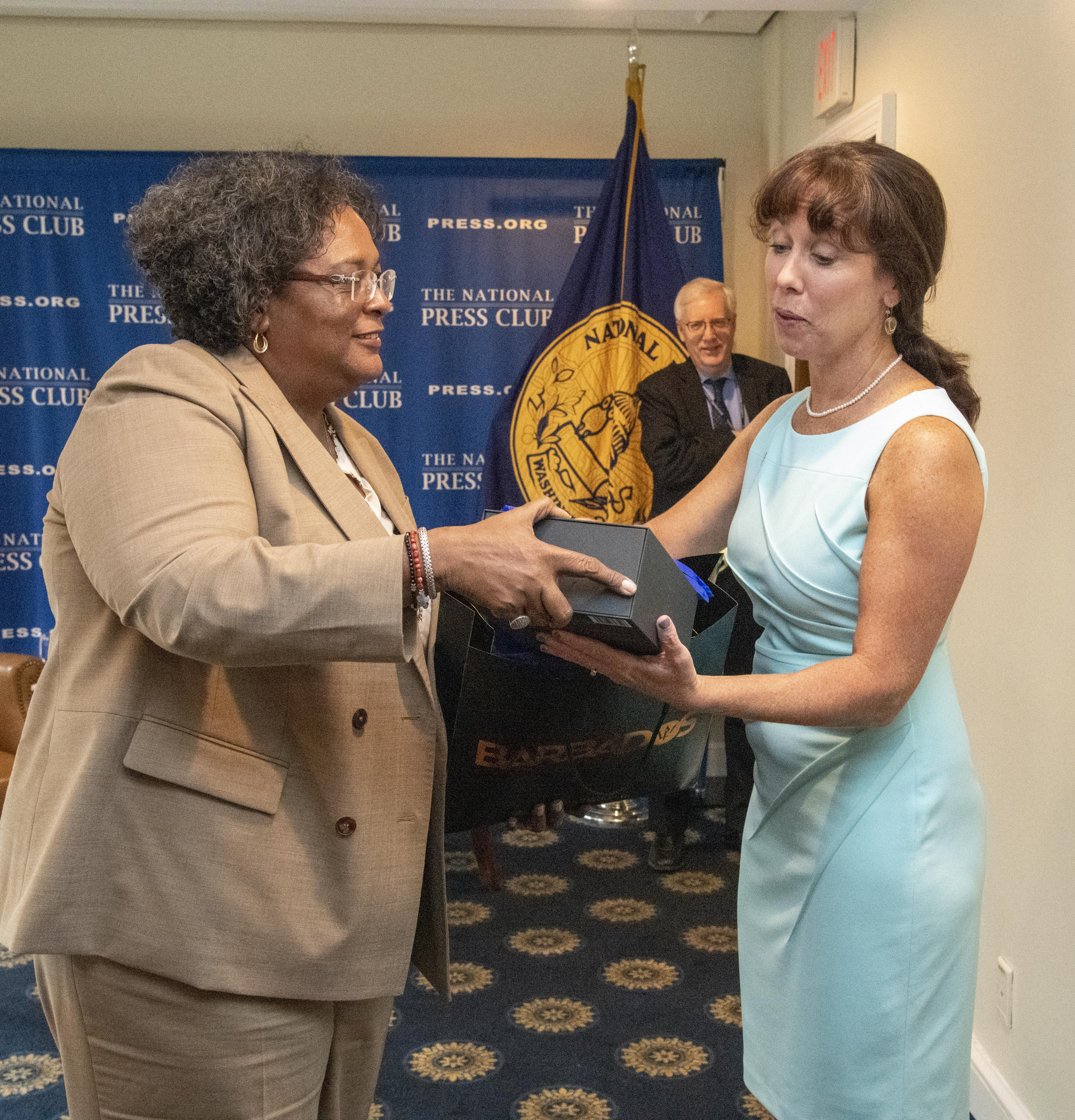
2019 - Mia Mottley and Alison Kodjak at the National Press Club

She began her journalism career at the Boston Phoenix before moving to The Philadelphia Inquirer as a general assignment reporter, followed by a three-year stint at The Palm Beach Post. She next moved to become an international editor at the Associated Press World Desk in New York from 1997 to 2000.

In 2000, Kodjak joined Bloomberg News to report on a wide variety of financial and business subjects, including the U.S auto industry, the Federal Reserve, the U.S. Treasury, economics and tax policy, winning several journalism awards. She frequently appeared on the Sunday morning talk show Political Capital with Al Hunt. In 2008, she broke the Allen Stanford ponzi scheme story after three years of investigation.

Kodjak was awarded the Overseas Press Club's Malcolm Forbes Award for her coverage of the international food price crisis in 2008 in a special seven-part series, "Recipe For Famine". Her coverage of the 2008 financial crisis and the ensuing government bailout won her several awards, including the 2009 George Polk Award for National Reporting with her Bloomberg colleagues Mark Pittman, Craig Torres, and Bob Ivry for their work entitled "Fed Defies Transparency Aim in Refusal to Identify Bank Loan". That project also resulted in Bloomberg L.P.'s lawsuit against the Federal Reserve after the central bank refused to disclose how taxpayer funds were used in the bailout of banks. Kodjak and the same team of Bloomberg colleagues were also named as finalists for The Gerald R. Loeb Award. In 2010, the four Bloomberg journalists were awarded the Hillman Prize for newspaper journalism for their article "The Fight For Transparency".

In 2010, Kodjak and her Bloomberg colleagues Mark Pittman, Bob Ivry, and Christine Harper were awarded the “Best of the Best” Award from the Society of American Business Editors and Writers (SABEW) in Projects for their "Lehman's Lessons" package that showed what led to the financial markets crash. In 2011, Kodjak was awarded the Everett McKinley Dirksen Award for Distinguished Reporting of Congress.

She moved to the Center for Public Integrity to head a new investigative journalism team in 2011. In 2013, Kodjak received her second George Polk Award for her reporting at the CPI on the fates of high-level financial and banking executives responsible for the 2008 financial crisis.

She is the co-author (as Alison Fitzgerald), with Stanley Reed, of the book In Too Deep: BP and the Drilling Race that Brought it Down, the story of BP's devastating oil-well explosion and spill in the Gulf of Mexico, and the corporate culture and governance that led to it.

On December 7, 2018, Kodjak was elected as 112th president of the National Press Club.

== Personal life ==
Kodjak sits on the Board of Governors of the National Press Club and is past Chairwoman of the Capital City Symphony in Washington, D.C.

Kodjak is married to Drew Kodjak, executive director of the International Council on Clean Transportation. They have three children and live in Takoma Park, Maryland.

== Awards ==
- 2008 - Malcolm Forbes Award - Overseas Press Club
- 2009 - George Polk Award
- 2009 - Gerald Loeb Award Finalist
- 2010 - Hillman Prize
- 2011 - Everett McKinley Dirksen Award for Distinguished Reporting of Congress
- 2011 - Best of the Best Award - Society of American Business Editors & Writers
- 2013 - George Polk Award
- 2019 - Gerald Loeb Award for Audio
- 2023 - Peabody Award

== See also ==
- List of George Polk Award Winners
