= Corbally =

Corbally is the name of several places in Ireland, including:

- Corbally, County Cork, a civil parish; see List of civil parishes of Ireland § Cork
- Corbally, County Down, a townland; see List of townlands in County Down
- Corbally, County Dublin, a large townland near Tallaght in County Dublin
- Corbally, County Limerick, a townland and suburb on the outskirts of Limerick city

== See also ==
- Daly Castle, formerly known as "Corbally", a ruined castle in County Galway
