= Craig Torres =

American financial journalist

Craig Torres is an American financial journalist, and reporter for Bloomberg News in Washington, D.C.

He graduated from Harvard College, and was a Bagehot Fellow at Columbia University Graduate School of Journalism in 1989.

Torres worked for a decade at The Wall Street Journal in the 1990s in a variety of jobs ranging from "Heard on the Street" columnist to chief of the paper's Mexico City bureau, where his work on the peso collapse made the finalist list for the 1996 Pulitzer Prize in international reporting.

Torres and Bloomberg colleagues Mark Pittman, Bob Ivry and Alison Fitzgerald won the George Polk Award for National Reporting in 2009 related to their work on Federal Reserve disclosure. The four journalists also won 2010 Hillman Prize for newspaper journalism.

Bloomberg News sued the Federal Reserve for disclosure related to separate Freedom of Information Act (FOIA) requests filed by Torres and Pittman. The requests sought information on financial assistance provided by the Fed during the 2008 financial crisis. The Fed disclosed Torres' component of the FOIA in March 2010, after the U.S. District Court in New York held that the Fed should release documents related to Bloomberg's request.

He is a member of the National Press Club.

== Awards ==
- 2010 Hillman Prize
- 2009 George Polk Award
- 1996 Pulitzer Prize in international reporting (finalist)
