= Fanny Currey =

Irish horticulturalist and watercolour painter

- Born: Frances Wilmot Currey; 30 May 1848; Lismore Castle, County Waterford
- Died: 30 March 1917 (aged 68); Lismore, County Waterford
- Resting place: Lismore, County Waterford
- Citizenship: Irish
- Known for: Watercolour painter and horticulturalist

Frances Wilmot "Fanny" Currey (30 May 1848 – 30 March 1917) was an Irish horticulturalist and watercolour painter. A founding member of Ireland's first amateur drawing society, the Water Colour Society of Ireland, Currey was widely exhibited in Ireland and Britain. She went on to become a daffodil cultivator at Warren Gardens, Lismore later in life.

== Life ==
Frances Wilmot Currey was born at Lismore Castle, County Waterford on 30 May 1848. She was the daughter of Anna and Francis Edmund Currey. Her father was employed as a land agent to the dukes of Devonshire, and was an early, accomplished photographer. Her cousin the writer and artist Edith Blake was a close friend of Currey, and from a young age was a frequent visitor to Newtown Anner House, County Tipperary. It is possible Currey received artistic training alongside Edith and her sister, as well as receiving training in Paris.

== Artistic work ==
Currey was one of the original members of the Irish Amateur Drawing Society, Ireland's earliest sketching club, founded in Lismore in 1870. Some of her drawings and watercolours featured in the group's first exhibition in 1871. She was an active member of the group, involved in all of their activities, and was involved in the hanging of the 1878 exhibition at the Athenaeum, Cork. The society was renamed the Water Colour Society of Ireland at their 1887-1888 exhibition in Belfast. Currey served for many years as the society's secretary. She debuted at the Royal Hibernian Academy in 1877, and was a regular exhibitor until 1896, with most of her work featuring flower studies and landscapes.

Currey had a successful career exhibiting in England, showing her work at the Royal Academy of Arts, Royal Society of Painters in Watercolour, Royal Institute of Oil Painters, and the Society of Women Artists, she became an appointed member of the latter in 1886. Her work was exhibited at the Dudley Gallery, Grosvenor Gallery, and New Gallery, the Walker Art Gallery in Liverpool, and the Manchester City Art Gallery. By the 1880s it was said that "she could not be considered an amateur in any sense of the word save one, that she is not dependent upon the pursuit for a livelihood." She was widely travelled, visiting and painting in England, Wales and Europe. Her 1888 work, A bazaar in Tangier, suggests that she visited North Africa.

== Horticultural work and later life ==
As she got older, Currey began to concentrate on gardening, professional bulb growing in particular. She was owner of the Warren nursery and gardens in Lismore, which specialised in daffodils. Some of her daffodils were awarded the silver gilt Banksian medal in 1909 by the Royal Horticultural Society in London. Currey was elected a member of the Royal Horticultural Society of Ireland in 1901. Edith Somerville recalls Currey's resistance to a proposed local authority drainage scheme that could destroy her daffodil plots by sitting on a wall with a shotgun. Around 1900, Currey collected two colour forms of wood anemone, Lismore Blue and Lismore Pink, which are still cultivated today. She noted that blue forms of wood anemone always grew near water, and was the recorder of the only Yellow Bartsia found in County Waterford.

Currey was a supporter of Women's suffrage, was the organist in Lismore cathedral, and was a keen fisher, shooter, woodworker, sculptor, and made mosaics. She wrote a fairy tale Prince Ritto or The four-leaved shamrock, published in 1877, with illustrations by Helen Sophia O'Hara, who lived with her from 1898. Currey died at her home, the Mall House, Lismore, on 30 March 1917.
