= Kill Chain =

Kill Chain may refer to:

- Kill chain, a military concept about structured attacks, and later cyber attacks
- "Kill Chain", an episode of the television series NCIS
- Kill Chain (film), a 2019 film starring Nicolas Cage
- Kill Chain: The Cyber War on America's Elections (2020), a documentary film with Harri Hursti
- Kill Chain: Drones and the Rise of High-Tech Assassins, a 2015 book by Andrew Cockburn
