= Edith Blake =

Irish painter and amateur lepidopterist (1846–1926)

Lady Blake
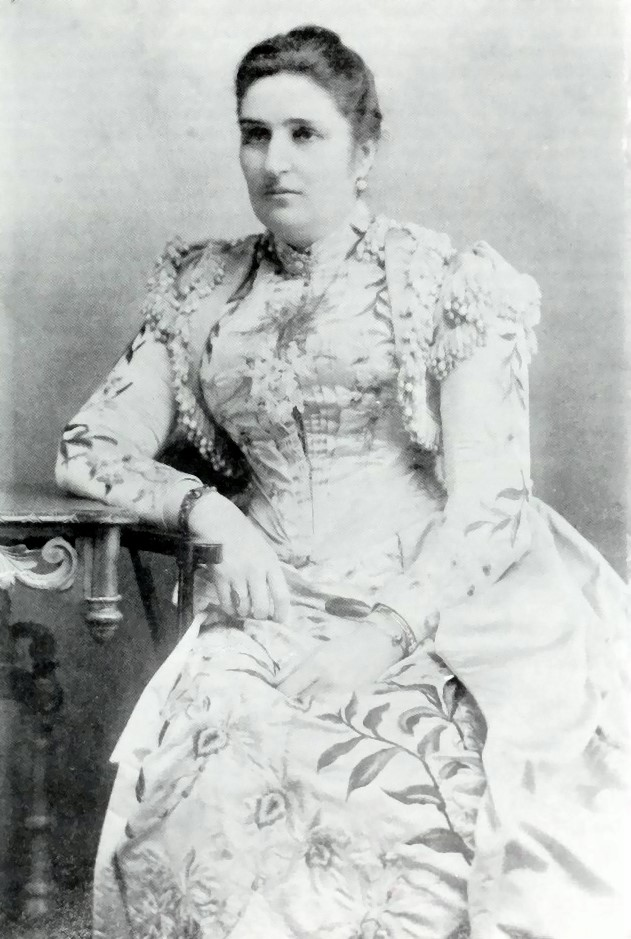
- Formal portrait, c. 1900

Spouse of the Governor of Hong Kong
- In office 25 November 1898 – 21 November 1903
- Governor: Sir Henry Arthur Blake
- Preceded by: Felicia Robinson
- Succeeded by: Flora Shaw, Lady Lugard

Personal details
- Born: Edith Bernal Osborne; 7 February 1846 Newtown Anner House, Clonmel, Ireland
- Died: 18 April 1926 (aged 80) Myrtle Grove, Youghal, Ireland
- Resting place: Myrtle Grove, Youghal
- Spouse: Henry Arthur Blake (m. 1874; died 1918)
- Children: 3
- Parents: Ralph Bernal; Catherine Isabella Osborne
- Relatives: Fanny Currey, Gwen Richardson
- Known for: Botanical illustration
- Notable work: Studies of Jamaican lepidoptera

Edith Bernal Blake, Lady Blake (née Osborne; 7 February 1846 – 18 April 1926) was an Irish botanical illustrator and writer, noted for her work on the flora and fauna of countries such as The Bahamas, Jamaica and Ceylon.

== Early life ==
Blake was born on 7 February 1846 in Newtown Anner House, near Clonmel, County Tipperary. Though her date of birth is often cited at 1845. She was the eldest daughter of Catherine Isabella Osborne and Ralph Bernal Osborne, who took his wife's surname following their marriage in 1844. The Osbornes appear to have become estranged early in their marriage, with her father living in London, seeing Edith and her sister Grace raised by her mother alone. Mrs Osbourne was a talented artist, and encouraged both her daughters to take up artistic pursuits. Artists often stayed at Newtown Anner, including Thomas Shotter Boys and Alexandre Calame, and it is possible the sisters received tuition from them. Edith developed an interest in botany around this time, corresponding over the years with Newtown Anner's garden designer Joseph Paxton. Fanny Currey was a frequent visitor to the house, with the pair collaborating on illustrating envelopes from 1858 to 1868.

In 1874 she married widower and Royal Irish Constabulary sub-inspector Henry Arthur Blake. As her parents did not approve of the marriage and had been arranging a suitable marriage for her, the couple eloped. Following the marriage, Edith was disinherited. They were sheltered for a time by friends Richard and Harriet Bagwell of Marlfield House. The couple went on to have two sons and a daughter. They first moved to Belfast, seeing Henry appointed resident magistrate (RM) in 1876 and a "special RM" during the land war. When he received assassination threats, Edith would travel with him armed with a gun. Despite her husband's work, Blake was sympathetic to romantic nationalism and became friends with Anna Parnell.

== Illustration and writing ==
Blake toured Europe in 1872, visiting Austria, Germany, Italy, Sicily, Greece, and Turkey. During these visits she took sketches of the local architecture, art, and culture which she published in her first book Twelve months in southern Europe (1876). Blake's second publication was The realities of Freemasonry in 1879. Blake's husband received his first appointment in the British colonial service in 1884, as governor of The Bahamas 1884 to 1887, followed by Newfoundland 1887 to 1888, Jamaica 1889 to 1897, Hong Kong 1898 to 1903, and Ceylon 1903 to 1907. Blake travelled with him, and rather than entertaining the local English expatriate community, she focused on her time on botany and painting. She studied local flora and fauna in watercolour, which she painted from nature. These were exhibited at the Museum of Science and Art, Dublin in 1894. 196 of her studies of the life stages of Jamaican lepidoptera are in the entomology library of the Natural History Museum, London, and more of her work is held by the National Botanic Gardens, Dublin. It is said that whilst in the Bahamas she was painted with a pet snake wrapped around her waist.

Blake produced landscapes, and painted the opening of the 1888 Placentia extension of the Newfoundland Railway. She contributed to a number of English and American scientific journals, and was heavily involved in the development of the countries the couple lived in. The National Museum of the Native American in New York (the George Gustav Heye Center) holds her collection of over 100 Native American artefacts from the Bahamas. She was an accomplished linguist, speaking 9 languages including Irish, Russian, and Chinese. The couple's three children were painted by Winslow Homer in Arabian dress.

In 1907, together with Sister Sudharmamachari (Catherine de Alwis Gunatilaka, born into a Christian family in Bentota before converting into Buddism), Blake opened a Buddhist nunnery which was named in her honour in Sri Lanka. Lady Blake Aramaya has since been renamed Sri Sudharma Upasikaramay.

== Later life ==
Upon Henry's retirement in 1907, the Blakes returned to Ireland. They settled in Myrtle Grove, Youghal, County Cork, where many of Blake’s sketchbooks are still held. The staircase was decorated by her with botanical illustrations. As Lady Blake she published 3 plays: Samhain's eve, The quest of Edain, and The swan, all adapted from Irish mythology.

Following her husband's death in 1918, Blake lived as a near recluse as a widow, but continued to paint. She died in Myrtle Grove on 18 April 1926, the same year her sister Grace died. The Blakes are buried together in the garden of the house.

Her collection in the Natural History Museum, London was conserved in 1984 and is noted for its scientific value.

== Selected publications ==
=== Non-fiction ===
- Twelve Months in Southern Europe. London, 1876.
- The Realities of Freemasonry. Chapman and Hall, London, 1879.
- "The Maroons of Jamaica" in The North American Review, Vol. 167 (1898), pp. 558-568.

=== Plays ===
- Samhain's Eve
- The Quest of Edain
- The Swan
