= Children Under a Palm =

Painting by Winslow Homer

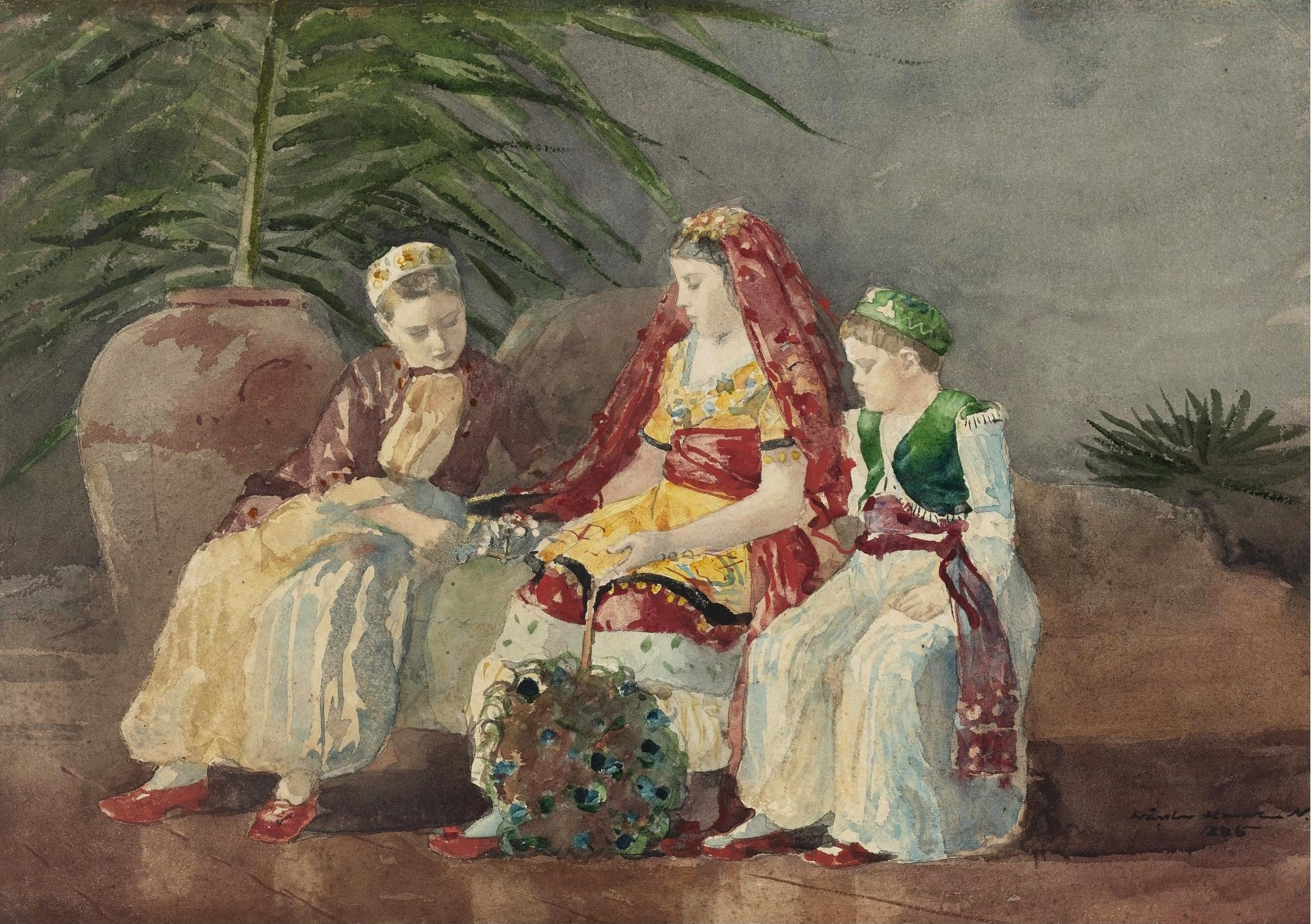
Winslow Homer's Children Under a Palm Tree

Children Under a Palm (or sometimes Children Under a Palm Tree) is a water colour painting executed in 1885 by the American artist Winslow Homer. It was featured in the second episode of the BBC TV series Fake or Fortune?.

== Origin ==
The work was painted in the Bahamas in 1885. It is in watercolour and pencil. It measures 14 inches by 20 inches and depicts the three children of Sir Henry Blake, the colonial governor of the Bahamas at the time, and his wife Lady Blake. They were attending a fancy dress party in Arabian costume. The party was also attended by Winslow Homer who was asked by Lady Blake to sketch the children. The central figure is Olive Blake. On either side of her are her younger brothers, Maurice and Arthur. Olive subsequently married John (Jack) Arbuthnot who wrote some of the Beachcomber columns. In her later years, Olive was described by one of her grandsons as being "a formidable looking woman of whom I was somewhat frightened".

The painting was not framed and was subsequently included among a number of works by Lady Blake who was herself an amateur artist. The family believed the painting was by her. After colonial service in Jamaica and Hong Kong, the Blakes retired to Myrtle Grove in Youghal, County Cork, Ireland.

== Antiques Roadshow ==
In 1987, the painting, along with a work by Lady Blake and other material related to the Blake family, was found by Tony Varney while fishing in Ireland. It was found just outside a rubbish dump, three miles from Myrtle Grove. He gave the painting to his daughter Selina Varney. In 2008, they took it to a recording of Antiques Roadshow (Note: Episode #486, the second of series 31, recorded at Althorp) where it was identified by Philip Mould as a work by Homer and valued at £30,000.

== Ownership controversy ==
The painting was featured in the second episode of the first series of the BBC TV programme, Fake or Fortune? Mr. Mould took it to New York to be sold by Sotheby's. They confirmed the attribution and valued it at over $100,000. It was included in their sale on 21 May 2009. It appeared in the catalogue without any reference to having been found; it was described simply as "private collection, 1987". A preview of the sale appeared in the Daily Telegraph. Miss Varney was flown to New York to observe the sale.

On the day before the sale, Simon Murray (the great grandson of Sir Henry Blake) claimed ownership of the painting on behalf of the family. Tom Christopherson, European General Counsel for Sotheby's, said that the Murrays were contacted by Sotheby's, as part of routine due diligence, prior to the auction. Sotheby's were told that the family had no record of owning a painting by Winslow Homer. Mr. Murray, however, holds that Sotheby's never discussed the painting with his family and that his mother was unaware of the sale until she saw a report in the Telegraph. Mr. Murray initially offered Miss Varney 25% of the sale proceeds as a "finder's fee". She rejected this offer and the parties initially agreed to continue the sale and resolve the dispute afterwards. On the day of the sale, however, Mr. Murray changed his mind. He offered 30% as a finder's fee, but without an agreement, he would no longer support the sale of the painting at auction. Miss Varney rejected the revised offer and Sotheby's followed their normal policy, withdrawing the painting because they could not guarantee a good title to anyone who bought the work. The painting was withdrawn with only three lots to go - unusually close to the sale time.

At a later date, the painting was placed on the Art Loss Register, operated by a commercial company based in London which charges a fee to register stolen paintings. The family believe it disappeared from Myrtle Grove after a series of robberies in the 1980s, although Philip Mould notes that there was no crime reported. According to Mr. Murray, his family didn't know that the painting was stolen until it was put up for auction at Sotheby's. Mr. Murray conducted further research among his family's papers and claimed to have found a letter which described the circumstances under which the painting was produced.

At the date of transmission of the programme (26 June 2011), ownership had become the subject of a legal dispute. In October 2013, the London Evening Standard reported that Shirley Rountree (Simon Murray's mother and a descendant of Sir Henry Blake) was suing Sotheby's for "return" of the painting. Sotheby's responded that ownership of the painting was still disputed and should be settled in the courts.

In November 2013, a new claimant emerged. Massachusetts native Clifford Schorer said the painting was used as security for a loan he made to Selina Varney (now Rendall) and that he was now entitled to it, the Blake family having failed to make a claim in a US court.

A barrister represented Selina Rendall in the title dispute with Shirley Rountree (Rountree v Rendall) turning on the English and Irish laws of:

- finding lost, mislaid, and abandoned property;
- limitation, by the automatic time-barring of claims — statute of limitations or more discretionary deeming of time to have run out — laches (equity).

As of 2022 the painting remained in Sotheby's possession with the court battle for the ownership ongoing.

== See also ==
- List of paintings by Winslow Homer
