= Gwen Richardson =

British writer

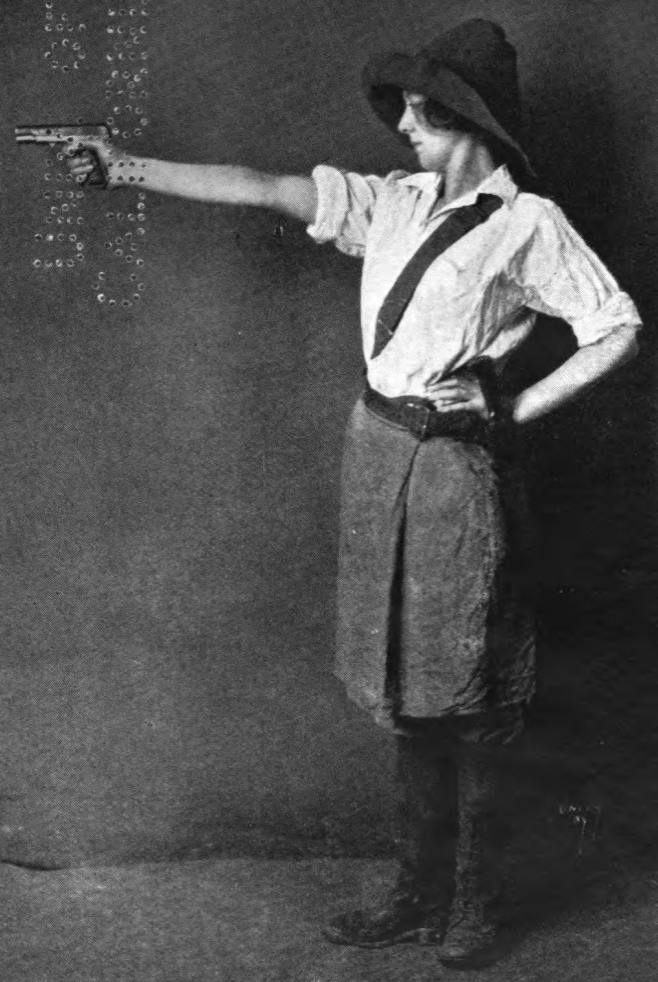
- Gwen Richardson's author photo from On the Diamond Trail in British Guiana (1925)
- Born: Gwendoline Whyte Richardson; 5 June 1894; Kew, Victoria, Australia
- Died: 27 November 1944 (aged 50); Surrey, England
- Other names: Gwendoline W. Blake (after marriage in 1925)
- Occupations: Actress, explorer, travel writer
- Notable work: On the Diamond Trail in British Guiana (1925)
- Relatives: Henry Arthur Blake (father-in-law); Edith Blake (mother-in-law)

Gwendoline "Gwen" Whyte Richardson (5 June 1894 – 27 November 1944) was an Australian actress and travel writer, author of On the Diamond Trail in British Guiana (1925).

== Early life ==
Gwendoline Whyte Richardson was born in Kew, and raised in Ballarat, Victoria, the daughter of Margaret Whyte Richardson and Laurence Richardson. Her father was an organist and music teacher. Her grandfather was a Scottish clergyman. Richardson performed on stage in Australia before and during World War I; she moved to England in 1916.

== Career ==
Richardson acted in Shakepearean plays at the Memorial Theatre in Stratford-on-Avon, hosted and coached by Ellen Terry. She entertained troops in London during World War I. She gave a lecture at the British Drama League's meeting in 1919, and toured in South America with a British theatrical company. She performed in Shaw's Misalliance at Boston's Copley Theatre in 1923.

In 1922, Richardson hired a boat and crew to travel along the Mazaruni River and Essequibo River in British Guiana and wrote about her journey in On the Diamond Trail in British Guiana (1925), a book described as "brimming with anecdote" and "flashes of wit" in the New York Times review. Coulson Kernahan noted that "Miss Richardson tells her story with modest reticence and with entire absence of exaggeration. She tells it with art, with vividness, and in simple English, in the writing of which she often attains distinction and beauty." Excerpts from the book were reprinted in American and Canadian newspapers, under sensational headlines and with maps and photos of Richardson handling snakes, scorpions, and guns. She was described alongside other white women adventurers of her time, including Rosita Forbes and Osa Helen Johnson.

Richardson donated two caecilian specimens from her expedition to the American Museum of Natural History. She made further travels in British Guiana with her husband in 1930, and spoke about British Guiana on BBC Radio in 1939.

== Personal life and legacy ==
Richardson married barrister and pilot Maurice Bernal Blake (1878–1934) at the British consulate on Corsica in 1925. They met on her first trip to British Guiana, when he accompanied her river expedition. His father was British colonial official Henry Arthur Blake, and his mother was botanical illustrator Edith Blake. She lived in the Italian spa town Sirmione in her later years, and was a friend of British actresses Naomi Jacob and Mrs. Patrick Campbell there. She died in 1944 in Surrey, aged 50 years.

Richardson's description of handling scorpions was included in the 1994 collection Unsuitable for Ladies: An Anthology of Women Travellers, edited by Jane Robinson. She is mentioned in the novel When the Singing Stops (2012) by Australian writer Di Morrissey, when the main character is inspired by Richardson's book to embark upon similar adventures.
