= Andrew Cockburn =

London-born journalist

- Born: Andrew Myles Cockburn; 7 January 1947 (age 79); Willesden, Middlesex, England
- Education: Worcester College, Oxford
- Occupation: Journalist
- Spouse: Leslie Redlich (m. 1977)
- Children: 3, including Olivia
- Parents: Claud Cockburn (father); Patricia Arbuthnot (mother)

Andrew Myles Cockburn (/ˈkoʊbərn/ KOH-bərn; born 7 January 1947) is a British journalist and the Washington, D.C., editor of Harper's Magazine. His books and articles are principally about national security, and he has produced documentary films. He has written about the Soviet military, U.S. military and national security operations, Israel, and Donald Rumsfeld. He is married to fellow journalist Leslie Cockburn, with whom he has worked on various reporting projects. They have three children, including actress Olivia Wilde.

== Early life ==
Born in the London suburb of Willesden in 1947, Cockburn grew up in County Cork, Ireland. His father was Communist author and journalist Claud Cockburn. His mother, Patricia Evangeline Anne (née Arbuthnot), was the granddaughter of British colonial administrator Henry Arthur Blake and British politician George Arbuthnot. . The Cockburns are related to Sir George Cockburn, 10th Baronet, who ordered the Burning of Washington in 1814.

Cockburn was educated at Glenalmond College, Perthshire, and Worcester College, Oxford.

He has two brothers, Alexander Cockburn (1941–2012) and Patrick Cockburn, also journalists, and two half-sisters. One sister, Sarah, was best known as the mystery writer Sarah Caudwell. The other sister, Claudia, was a disability activist and married Michael Flanders, half of the well-known performance double-act Flanders and Swann; the two children of this marriage are the journalists Laura Flanders and Stephanie Flanders, Cockburn's half-nieces.

== Career ==
Cockburn has written numerous books and articles, principally about national security. He has also produced numerous documentary films, principally in partnership with his wife Leslie Cockburn, as well as co-produced the 1997 thriller The Peacemaker, starring George Clooney and Nicole Kidman, for DreamWorks. After an early career in British newspapers and television, he moved to the United States in 1979.

His film The Red Army, produced for PBS in 1981, was the first in-depth report on the serious deficiencies of Soviet military power and won a Peabody Award. In 1982, his book The Threat – Inside the Soviet Military Machine was published by Random House; it examined the same topic in greater depth. He subsequently published many articles on the subject of US and Soviet military power as well as lecturing at numerous military bases, foreign policy forums, and colleges and innumerable television shows. After the collapse of the Soviet Union, he began covering Middle Eastern subjects, including the 1991 documentary on the after-effects of the first Gulf War, The War We Left Behind, which he co-produced for PBS with Leslie Cockburn.

In 1988, Andrew and Leslie Cockburn wrote, produced and directed the PBS Frontline documentary Guns, Drugs and the CIA about the CIA's role in international drug dealings.

In 2009 he and Leslie Cockburn produced American Casino, a feature-length documentary on the 2008 financial crisis. New Yorker critic David Denby called it "A terrific documentary... Everything is connected: the movie embodies chaos theory for social pessimists." Apart from his books he has written for National Geographic, the Los Angeles Times, the London Review of Books, Smithsonian, Vanity Fair, Harper's Magazine, CounterPunch, Condé Nast Traveler, The New York Times, and the Dungarvan Observer. He is Washington Editor of Harper's Magazine.

In 2007, Cockburn wrote Rumsfeld: His Rise, Fall, and Catastrophic Legacy (subtitled An American Disaster in the UK edition). In The New York Times, reviewer Jacob Heilbrunn called it "perceptive and engrossing."

He wrote "21st Century Slaves" for National Geographic, which reported on the practice of modern-day slavery. He authored Kill Chain – The Rise of the High-Tech Assassins (2015), which details the evolution of drone warfare, and the shift to assassination as the principal US military strategy. Kirkus Review called it "sharp-eyed and disturbing."

== Personal life ==
In 1977, he married Leslie Corkhill Redlich in San Francisco. They have three children: Chloe Frances, the actress Olivia Wilde, and Charles Philip.

== Bibliography ==
=== Books ===
- The Threat: Inside the Soviet Military Machine. New York: Random House, 1983. ISBN 0-394-52402-0.
- Dangerous Liaison: The Inside Story of the US-Israeli Covert Relationship, with Leslie Cockburn. New York: HarperCollins, 1991. ISBN 0-06-016444-1.
- One Point Safe, with Leslie Cockburn. New York: Doubleday, 1997. ISBN 0-385-48560-3.
- Out of the Ashes: The Resurrection of Saddam Hussein, with Patrick Cockburn. New York: HarperCollins, 1999. ISBN 0-06-019266-6.
- Saddam Hussein: An American Obsession, with Patrick Cockburn. New York: Verso Books, 2002.ISBN 1-85984-422-7.
- Rumsfeld: His Rise, Fall, and Catastrophic Legacy. New York: Charles Scribner's Sons, 2007.ISBN 1-4165-3574-8.
- Kill Chain: The Rise of the High-Tech Assassins. New York: Henry Holt and Co., 2015. ISBN 9780805099263.
- The Spoils of War: Power, Profit and the American War Machine, Verso, 2021, ISBN 1839763655
