= Helen Sophia O'Hara =

Irish watercolour artist (1846–1920)

- Born: 1846; Portstewart, County Londonderry, Ireland
- Died: 1920 (aged 73/74); County Waterford, Ireland
- Known for: botanical and landscape painting

Helen Sophia O'Hara (1846–1920) was an Irish watercolour artist.

== Life ==
Helen Sophia O'Hara was born in The Castle Portstewart, County Londonderry, in 1846. She was the daughter of the Reverend James D. O'Hara. Her brother, H.S. O'Hara was the Bishop of Cashel and Emly, and Lismore, County Waterford. She lived with her friend and fellow artist Fanny Currey at the Mall, Lismore, from 1898 until 1919. It is believed that O'Hara received no formal training and was self-taught. She died in Waterford in 1920.

== Artistic work ==
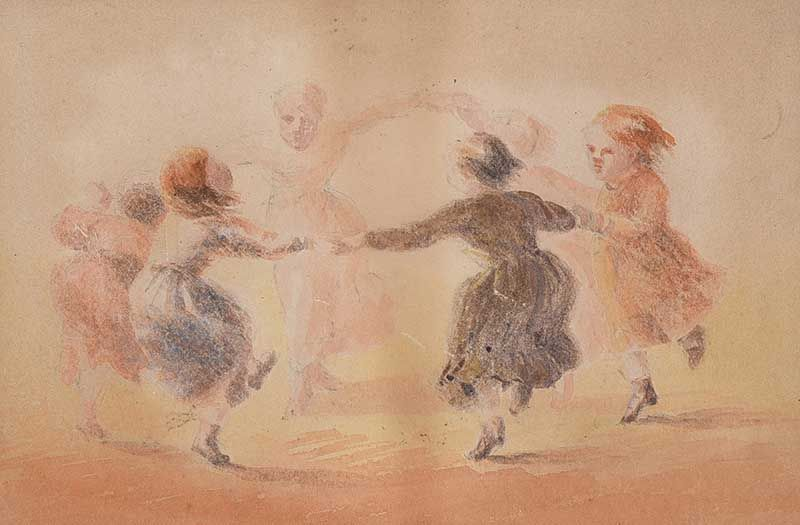
Dancing Children by O'Hara

O'Hara was a watercolour painter, whose work centred on landscapes and seascapes, as well as flower painting. She exhibited with the Royal Hibernian Academy from 1881 to 1894. She was a member of the Belfast Art Society (BAS), and although she retired in 1895, she was elected vice-president in 1896. Whilst living in Lismore with Currey, O'Hara illustrated a number of Currey's children's books. Her work was exhibited with the Society of Women Artists, the Dudley Gallery, and the Royal Institute of Painters in Water Colours. She exhibited over 100 artworks, landscapes and seascapes, with the Water Colour Society of Ireland from 1892 to 1913. O'Hara was elected an honorary member of the BAS in 1904 along with Mildred Anne Butler, John Lavery, and Frank Spenlove-Spenlove. The Ulster Museum holds a number of her works.
