= The Peacemaker (1997 film) =

1997 American political action thriller film by Mimi Leder

- Theatrical release poster
- Directed by: Mimi Leder
- Screenplay by: Michael Schiffer
- Based on: One Point Safe by Andrew Cockburn and Leslie Redlich Cockburn
- Produced by: Walter F. Parkes; Branko Lustig
- Starring: George Clooney; Nicole Kidman; Armin Mueller-Stahl
- Cinematography: Dietrich Lohmann
- Edited by: David Rosenbloom
- Music by: Hans Zimmer
- Production company: DreamWorks Pictures
- Distributed by: DreamWorks Distribution
- Release date: September 26, 1997
- Running time: 124 minutes
- Country: United States
- Languages: English; Russian; Serbo-Croatian
- Budget: $50 million
- Box office: $110.4 million

The Peacemaker is a 1997 American political action thriller film directed by Mimi Leder in her feature film debut and starring George Clooney, Nicole Kidman and Armin Mueller-Stahl. Released on September 26, 1997, it was the first film to produced by DreamWorks Pictures and to be distributed by DreamWorks Distribution. It follows a colonel and nuclear specialist working together to track down stolen Russian nuclear warheads. While the story takes place all over the world, it was shot primarily in Slovakia with some sequences filmed in New York City, Philadelphia and North Macedonia. The basis of the film was the 1997 book One Point Safe by Andrew and Leslie Cockburn, which examined the state of Russia's nuclear arsenal.

== Plot ==
Outside a church celebrating an Eastern Orthodox baptism in Pale, Bosnia, the Bosnian Serb Finance Minister, a moderate pushing for peace in the ongoing Yugoslav Wars, is murdered.

At a missile base in Kartaly (Chelyabinsk Oblast), Russia, ten Soviet nuclear warheads that belong to a SS-18 Satan ICBM are loaded onto a train for transport to a dismantling facility. However, Russian Army General Aleksandr Kodoroff, along with a rogue Spetznaz unit, kills the soldiers on board and transfers nine warheads to another train.

Kodoroff then activates the timer on the remaining warhead and sends the transport on a collision course with a passenger train. The 500-kiloton warhead eventually detonates, killing thousands of civilians and delaying an investigation of the incident.

The detonation attracts the attention of the US government. Dr. Julia Kelly, head of the NSC Nuclear Smuggling Group, believes that Chechen are behind the incident.

Former US Army Ranger and Special Forces turned Military Intelligence Lieutenant Colonel Thomas Devoe interrupts her briefing to suggest that the incident was staged to hide the hijacking of the warheads. A call to Devoe's friend and Russian counterpart, FSB Colonel Dimitri Vertikoff, adds reliability to his theory, and he is assigned as Kelly's military liaison.

Kelly and Devoe secure information about the terrorists' hijacking operation through an Austrian trucking company that works as a front for the Russian Mafia. They meet Vertikoff in Vienna and assume identities to visit Shummaker, who organizes the Russian trucking.

After Devoe tortures Shummaker for information, he and Kelly leave the building and get in Vertikoff's car. They are chased by Shumaker's men, who kill Vertikoff while he is offering a bribe. Devoe shoots at the attackers and drives away but finds he and Kelly are being followed. Another chase ensues, followed by a crash, but Devoe and Kelly escape.

Information from the trucking company says that the nukes are going to Iran via Azerbaijan. When US spy satellites place the truck in a traffic jam of refugees in Dagestan, Devoe uses a ruse to identify it. This information is passed on to Russian authorities, hoping to stop the transfer to Iran. The Russian military stops Kodoroff at a roadblock, but he and his men kill the soldiers.

Devoe leads an airborne Special Operations team from a U.S. base in Turkey to stop them. Denied entry into Russian airspace, one of the three Special Ops helicopters is shot down by a Russian missile, but the remaining two manage to locate Kodoroff's truck. Firing missiles which disable Kodoroff's truck, they then engage in a gunfight, killing Kodoroff and securing the warheads. However, interrogation of the group's surviving member, a U.S.-educated Pakistani nuclear scientist, reveals that one warhead had been sent off with an operative before the truck was intercepted.

The information from the trucking company leads IFOR to a Sarajevo address. Inside is a video cassette of Dušan Gavrić, a Bosnian who disclaims allegiance to any particular faction in the Yugoslav Wars, but blames other countries for supplying weapons to all sides in the conflict. Kelly's further analysis of the trucking company documents suggests that Gavrić intends to bomb a meeting at the UN headquarters in NYC. Gavrić arrives in Manhattan with the Bosnian diplomatic delegation, having replaced the murdered Finance Minister.

Gavrić intends to avenge the death of his wife and daughter, who died in Sarajevo during a sniper attack. He and his brother are later found by Devoe and Kelly. When his brother is killed by Devoe, a wounded and enraged Gavrić flees into a parochial school. Devoe and Kelly confront Gavrić, who commits suicide, knowing that the bomb is set to go off in minutes.

With only seconds to spare, Kelly manages to remove part of the bomb's explosive lens shell and stop the primary explosion from establishing critical mass within the plutonium core. The primary explosives detonate, wrecking the church, as Devoe and Kelly dive out of a window. However, Kelly's efforts prevent it from causing a nuclear explosion.

Kelly later is seen swimming laps in a pool. Devoe stops by and asks her out for a drink, which she accepts.

== Cast ==
- George Clooney as Lieutenant Colonel Thomas Devoe
- Nicole Kidman as Dr. Julia Kelly
- Marcel Iureș as Dusan Gavrich (phonetic of "Dušan Gavrić")
- Aleksandr Baluev as Russian Army General Aleksandr Kodoroff
- Rene Medvešek as Vlado Mirich (phonetic of "Mirić")
- Gary Werntz as Hamilton
- Randall Batinkoff as Ken
- Jim Haynie as General Garnett
- Alexander Strobele as Hans Shummaker
- Holt McCallany as Mark Appleton
- Michael Boatman as CPN Beach
- Joan Copeland as Senator Bevens
- Carlos Gomez as Santiago
- Armin Mueller-Stahl as Russian Federal Security Service Colonel Dimitri Vertikoff
- Bruce MacVittie as DOE Helo Tech
- Harsh Nayyar as Dr. Taraki
- Aleksandr Peskov as Russian Army Captain Vasiliy, accomplice of Kodoroff
- Goran Višnjić as Russian Army Sergeant
- Alexander Kuznetsov as Russian Air and Missile Defense Forces Controller

== Production ==
Two years after initially forming, DreamWorks still had no live-action films in production, which was a serious concern for financiers. A reason for the slow start was since co-founder Steven Spielberg was busy directing The Lost World: Jurassic Park, a project not tied to his new studio. Among the DreamWorks scripts in development, The Peacemaker was the closest to shooting readiness, and it became the first to be officially greenlit. The other live-action scripts the studio was considering greenlighting were Amistad and Mouse Hunt (both released later in 1997) and Paulie (released in 1998). The Peacemaker script was inspired by a then-unpublished Vanity Fair article by Andrew Cockburn and Leslie Redlich Cockburn. The two were a married couple who worked as contributing editors for the publication. The Cockburns article was later turned into a book titled One Point Safe, and the couple served as producers on The Peacemaker. One Point Safe was published in October 1997, a month after The Peacemaker's release.

The film would end up being the inaugural release from DreamWorks Pictures. It featured the debut of the 25 second long CGI DreamWorks Pictures opening logo. The logo had accompanying music by John Williams, a frequent collaborator of Spielberg. This same logo would be used for early releases from DreamWorks Animation. The animation division launched a year later with the film Antz, and it was part of the same company as the live-action division until October 2004, when it split off into its own separate corporate entity.

George Clooney had initially been set to do a Green Hornet movie at Universal Pictures starring alongside Jason Scott Lee with Sam Raimi directing, but Clooney opted to sign on for The Peacemaker. Spielberg framed The Peacemaker as being DreamWorks' inaugural film project, which helped persuade Clooney. At that time, Clooney starred on ER, which was produced by Spielberg's other company Amblin Television. The Peacemaker was the first theatrical film directed by Mimi Leder, who was known for her work on ER and other television shows. Leder's only experience directing feature length projects was with her work on made-for-television movies. Leder was surprised that Spielberg wanted her to direct The Peacemaker, since she thought he would opt for an established director with more film directing experience. In retrospect, Leder said in 2023, "I wish they would make more movies like that. And I would make them because that's what I'm interested in! It was a very exciting experience to be able to keep The Peacemaker grounded in the real world. We actually shot the New York chase sequences first, and we were working at such a high level. We were like, 'Is it too big?' But you can't be too big in a chase where you're trying to save the world from a nuke!"

The film's female lead Nicole Kidman was chosen by Leder, after Spielberg had already cast Clooney. In an October 1997 Vanity Fair interview, Leder said "I knew that the character is smart and precise in the way she goes about finding who the terrorist is, and that's how I saw Nicole: smart and precise, both in the way she tackles a role and the way she lives her life." Clooney had never worked with Kidman prior to The Peacemaker. According to Clooney in 1997, there was no rehearsal time for him and Kidman. Clooney said, "so what we had to do was immediately, the two of us, just get along. Be friends!". He added that, "I'd just worked with Michelle Pfeiffer. They're similar: never a false word out of their mouths. You never think they're acting!." Clooney also said he was impressed with how well Kidman could act while having to do a fake American accent, as she was raised in Australia. Kidman had started experimenting with blonde hair in her roles, although for The Peacemaker her character had auburn hair, which is Kidman's natural hair color. For The Peacemaker's press tour and later films, she began wearing blonde hair more often. Salon wrote in a 1997 article that Kidman likely didn't have blonde hair for her character since it contrasted with the unglamorous tone of the film.

To ensure the film's military portrayals were accurate, the script for The Peacemaker was reviewed by Louisa Jaffe. Since the 1970s, Jaffe had been an officer in the United States Army Adjutant General's Corps, and was working for The Pentagon at the time.

The film's opening scenes also included Toše Proeski as one of the extras in the boys' choir. Proeski would later build a career as a famous popstar in the countries of the former Yugoslavia.

During late 1997, a $16 million Dolph Lundgren film with a similar plot called The Peacekeeper was released theatrically overseas. Both The Peacemaker and The Peacekeeper were in production around the same time.

== Music ==
The Peacemaker: Original Motion Picture Soundtrack

Soundtrack album by Hans Zimmer
- Released: September 9, 1997 (original); May 20, 2014 (expanded edition)
- Studios: Air Lyndhurst, London, England; EMI Abbey Road Studios, London, England; Media Ventures, Los Angeles, CA
- Genre: Film score
- Length: 54:40 (original); 152:16 (expanded edition)
- Labels: DreamWorks Records (original); La-La Land Records (expanded edition)

Hans Zimmer chronology
| Smilla’s Sense of Snow (Original Motion Picture Soundtrack) (1997) | The Peacemaker: Original Motion Picture Soundtrack (1997) | As Good As It Gets (Music From The Motion Picture) (1998) |

On September 9, 1997, Hans Zimmer's background score for the film was released on an album titled The Peacemaker: Original Motion Picture Soundtrack. The release was handled by DreamWorks Records, which was primarily focused on releasing non-movie related albums by rock and pop artists. DreamWorks Records also released John Williams' score for Amistad in 1997, and starting in 1998, occasionally released multi-artist compilation albums for DreamWorks films. On May 20, 2014, La-La Land Records released an expanded 25 track version of the original 1997 album for The Peacemaker. This 2014 release was done in association with Universal Music Group, who purchased DreamWorks Records for $100 million in 2003.

=== Track listing (1997) ===
| No. | Title | Music | Length |
|---|---|---|---|
| 1. | "Trains" | | 13:53 |
| 2. | "Devoe's Revenge" | Gavin Greenaway | 5:15 |
| 3. | "Sarajevo" | | 8:42 |
| 4. | "Chase" | | 17:07 |
| 5. | "Peacemaker" | | 9:43 |
| Total length: | | | 54:40 |

=== Track listing (2014) ===
| No. | Title | Music | Length |
|---|---|---|---|
| 1. | "Voice Of God / Vassily's Dilemma" | | 6:49 |
| 2. | "Hijack" | | 7:46 |
| 3. | "It Wasn't An Accident / Exporting Good Will / Smoke Screen" | | 3:55 |
| 4. | "Bombs On The Move / Alexsander Kodoroff / Kodoroff's Alive" | | 5:11 |
| 5. | "Good Guys / Bad Guys / Dusan's Village" | | 1:51 |
| 6. | "Keep On Truckin' / Head Of Transportation / Hasselhoff / Escape" | | 4:38 |
| 7. | "Car Chase" | | 5:51 |
| 8. | "Forty-Four E / Dusan's Confession" | | 3:24 |
| 9. | "Truck Convoy / License Plate" | | 2:46 |
| 10. | "Nocturne In C# Minor" | Frédéric Chopin | 1:15 |
| 11. | "Get Me Authorized" (Featuring Mamak Khadem) | | 2:38 |
| 12. | "Checkpoint / Helicopter Chase" | | 12:11 |
| 13. | "One Unaccounted For / Dusan Gets Bomb / Dusan's Speech" | | 5:06 |
| 14. | "He's Going To New York / F.B.I. N.Y. / Swiss Flight #1204" | | 4:37 |
| 15. | "Dusan's Flashback" | | 6:18 |
| 16. | "Dusan With Bomb / Dusan In Church" | | 11:18 |
| 17. | "Dusan Kills Himself" | | 3:28 |
| 18. | "Dr. Kelly Is O.K. / Dr. Kelly Got 10 More" | | 3:28 |
| 19. | "Trains (Original Album Version)" | | 13:54 |
| 20. | "Devoe's Revenge (Original Album Version)" | Gavin Greenaway | 5:16 |
| 21. | "Sarajevo (Original Album Version)" | | 8:43 |
| 22. | "Chase (Original Album Version)" | | 17:06 |
| 23. | "Peacemaker (Original Album Version)" | | 9:45 |
| 24. | "Get Me Authorized (Alternate Vocals)" (Featuring Lisbeth Scott) | | 2:42 |
| 25. | "The Peacemaker Trailer Music" | Harry Gregson-Williams | 2:18 |
| Total length: | | | 152:16 |

== Release ==
=== Promotion ===
A real billboard promoting The Peacemaker can be seen in the 1998 comedy film A Night at the Roxbury. This film was shot in Los Angeles between July 1997 and September 18, 1997, with the billboard having the date "9.26.97" on it, which was the actual date The Peacemaker would be released. A Night at the Roxbury was released by Paramount Pictures (the future owner of the live-action DreamWorks library from 2006 onward), and would end up having its soundtrack released by DreamWorks Records, with this being one of the label's only non DreamWorks Pictures-related soundtracks.

=== Box office ===
The film began its theatrical run on September 26, 1997, playing to nearly 2,500 theaters domestically. Earning $12.3 million in its opening weekend, The Peacemaker beat In & Out, Soul Food and The Edge to reach the number one spot. The film earned $41,263,140 in the US and $69,200,000 elsewhere, bringing its total to $110,463,140.

== Reception ==
On the review aggregator website Rotten Tomatoes, 49% of 41 critics' reviews are positive, with an average rating of 6/10. Metacritic, which uses a weighted average, assigned the film a score of 43 out of 100, based on 20 critics, indicating "mixed or average" reviews. Audiences polled by CinemaScore gave the film an average grade of "B+" on an A+ to F scale.

=== Contemporary response ===
Janet Maslin of The New York Times gave praise to Clooney and Kidman for portraying a "charming rogue" and expressing "womanly professionalism as fierce, hostile sternness" in their respective roles and Leder's direction of the movie's action setpieces, highlighting the Manhattan climax for having "crisp economy and furious energy" throughout the scene. Marc Savlov of The Austin Chronicle said that despite the "ever-present plot holes and isoscelean character arcs" throughout the film's story and villains, he praised Leder's directorial skills for keeping things fresh throughout the runtime and adding "clever swagger" to the action scenes, concluding that: "By no means an embarrassment to the fledgling DreamWorks, The Peacemaker is instead a grand, noisy step in the right direction. What next, indeed?" In October 1997, CNN's Paul Tatara described it as a film that "just keeps rolling along at a steady clip". He also observed that Kidman slipped in and out of her Australian accent, saying "if you don't completely buy something (like, for instance, Kidman's highly unique Ameristralian accent), something else will be along in a minute to take its place."

Roger Ebert commended the "technical credits" and both Clooney and Kidman for expertly fulfilling their roles but felt the rest of the film was filled with "retreaded" and "off-the-shelf" thriller clichés and concluded with a bomb defusal third act that lacked the "real endings involving character developments and surprises" found in similar films like The Edge and Kiss the Girls. Entertainment Weekly's Owen Gleiberman gave the film an overall "C+" grade, giving Leder's direction credit for staging her scenes with "crisp exactitude, [and with] a pleasing flair for "rhythmic" visual detail" and adding "elegant and accomplished" atmospherics, but felt that it amounts to being "a well-crafted, utterly generic genre piece" that carries "an air of self-important solemnity that borders on the overblown", concluding that: "In The Peacemaker, nothing escapes the taint of cliche. As the inaugural feature from DreamWorks, the picture is vaguely depressing, because it suggests that the studio’s creators are working so laboriously to manufacture a hit that they’ve forgotten to put in the dream." James Berardinelli criticized the over-long runtime of the movie's "paper-thin plot", the "lack of creativity" in the death scenes and failing to sympathize with the villains' plight, concluding that: "The Peacemaker isn't much better or worse than the average James Bond movie, except, of course, that it doesn't have the cars, the gadgets, the girls, or Bond himself. There's a certain appeal to the premise, but the execution is uneven. The movie is likely to keep an audience's attention, but it's the kind of film that is quickly forgotten."

In a December 1997 episode of her program The Movie Show, Australian critic Margaret Pomeranz criticized the overtly pro-American political messaging but praised the film itself. She said, "The Peacemaker is the first film to emerge from the new DreamWorks Pictures, with Steven Spielberg, David Geffen and Jeffrey Katzenberg as its principals, and guess what, it's a rollicking action adventure", adding that "The Peacemaker moves at a ripping pace, it's been really well-made by first time feature director Mimi Leder." In November 1997, Hong Kong paper the South China Morning Post noted the significance of the film, writing "sit down to watch The Peacemaker, and you will see something historic less than 30 seconds into the film: the logo of DreamWorks SKG. Never before has it been attached to a film, for The Peacemaker marks DreamWorks' debut." They added that, "the studio 'tag' that opens a movie is rarely of much interest to the average movie-goer, but this is an exception. DreamWorks SKG is not only the first new Hollywood movie studio in decades, but an entertainment 'dream team'."

=== Retrospective response ===
In 2017, Chris Bumbray of JoBlo.com described it as being a rare example of an action film directed by a female, adding it was "a Tom Clancy-style techno thriller" and "an offbeat choice to launch the [DreamWorks] studio." Some have since labelled it as being a "forgotten" film, in spite of its initial press hype as being the first DreamWorks Pictures release.

== Home media and rights ==
In 1998, the film was released on DVD and VHS by DreamWorks Home Entertainment. On July 27, 1998, it also received a US LaserDisc release by DreamWorks Home Entertainment. The following year, it received LaserDisc releases in France and Japan, with the French release being dubbed and the Japanese release being subtitled. In September 1997, a promotional CD-ROM press kit was released for the film, although it would not have any video game tie-in by DreamWorks Interactive, which ended up mainly releasing non-DreamWorks related video games. The film's 1998 DVD was briefly shown during a scene in the DreamWorks Animation film Flushed Away (2006). The scene depicted several DreamWorks Animation DVDs, alongside The Peacemaker and other live-action DreamWorks DVDs including Just like Heaven, Mouse Hunt, Old School, Paulie, Red Eye, The Last Castle and The Love Letter.

On September 21, 2010, Paramount Home Entertainment released The Peacemaker on Blu-ray for the first time.

On March 4, 2021, it was made available on Paramount's then-new streaming service Paramount+, as one of its inaugural launch titles, and on June 24, 2025, a 4K Ultra HD edition of the film was released by Kino Lorber, under license from Paramount Pictures.

=== Television airings ===
The Peacemaker was pulled from its scheduled airing on ABC on September 14, 2001, due to the September 11 attacks.
