= Elizabeth Streb =

American choreographer and dancer

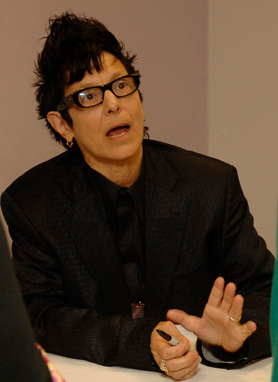
- Streb in 2010
- Born: February 23, 1950 (age 76); Rochester, New York, US
- Education: SUNY Brockport (BS); New York University (MA)
- Occupations: Choreographer and dancer
- Spouse: Laura Flanders

Elizabeth Streb (born February 23, 1950) is an American choreographer, performer, and teacher of contemporary dance.

== Background ==
Streb was born and raised in Rochester, New York and, after graduating from the dance program of State University of New York at Brockport in 1972, she was interested in experimental works and worked and performed for many years with investigational groups including Molissa Fenley's. She also worked and performed with Margaret Jenkins in San Francisco for two years before relocating back to New York City In 1975, upon her arrival in New York City, Streb created her dance company STREB/ Ringside.

Streb received a 1996 Foundation for Contemporary Arts Grants to Artists Award. In 1997, she was awarded a fellowship from the John D. and Catherine T. MacArthur Foundation (sometimes called a “Genius” grant), two New York Dance and Performance (Bessie) Awards, and grants from John Simon Guggenheim Foundation, Creative Capital, The National Endowment for the Arts, the New York Foundation for the Arts and the Mellon Foundation.

In 2003, Streb established SLAM (Streb Lab for Action Mechanics) in Williamsburg, Brooklyn which created a new outlet for the community where people could come and watch rehearsals and even participate in classes. She also published her documentary "Streb: Pop Action" showcasing some of the rehearsals and dances she has created at SLAM and giving insight into her life and career. In 2010, Streb's book, How to Become an Extreme Action Hero, was published by The Feminist Press.

== Career advancements ==
Streb is known for “A preoccupation with movement and itself was symptomatic of a trend that was altering the traditional profile of modern dance.”

Elizabeth Streb received the 2000 Creative Capital Award in Performing Arts to develop Action Heroes, a project that worked with the Espana Circus Family to try to find the universal actions that transcend class by fusing movement associated with the circus with movement associated with high-risk sports.

She has been creating works from 1975 to the present and is known for her outrageous risk taking and experimental shows she puts on. Streb includes risk into all of her choreography, giving the audience sensations of extreme feelings while watching the performers. She inquired about movement and the suppositions that the dance world created; and integrated actions and principles of the circus, rodeo, and daredevil “stunts.” She is interested in the effects of gravity, math, and physics on her choreography. And has said, “A question like: Can you fall up? This is the bedrock of my process” and that she tries “to notice what questions have not been asked in a particular field that need to be asked and answered.” She grew up participating in extreme sports, therefore she associates a lot of her work with athletics; for example, skiing and motorcycling, and has also expressed her interest in the circus and performance artists such as Chris Burden, Marina Abramović, and admires Trisha Brown.

She wanted to gain a better understanding of the effects of movement on matter so she studied math, physics, and philosophy as Dean's Special Scholar at New York University. Streb explains that "'Pop-Action' is all about the popping of the muscles, training to utilize them over the movement of the skeleton." Custom-made trapezes, trusses, trampolines, and a flying machine give Streb a way to discover new ways for the body to move in space while being subjected to gravity. Moves consist of diving off 16-foot-high (4.9 m) metal scaffolding, also known as a "truss," landing level on a mat. The performers also can be found launching through the air in “Quick succession with timing so precise that they just miss occupying the same space at the same time.”

Streb's work is extremely demanding and necessitates endurance, dexterity, great physical strength, and the ability to be daring. Streb focused progressively more on single actions, particularly falls and collisions. By 2010, Streb stopped performing these extreme actions herself, explaining that, “I stopped because that started to become the subject of my activity. I started to hear, Wow, you can still do that and you’re 48? It was a practical decision—three hours a day to keep in that shape?...I had been training for 30 years. It’s very boring to exercise. I stopped. I let it go, which was a good thing.” But says, “I still let extreme things happen to me.”

In her recent years, productions have become less harsh and she has begun incorporating texts, videos, and projections of slides. Within her video collaborations, she incorporates camera angles that appear to evade gravity and make the dancers bound off and crash into the edges of the monitors. They also are often swung from cables and are seen leaping off platforms or hurling against padded walls or mattresses. The dancers who train under Elizabeth Streb are taught to follow movement's natural force to the edge of real danger. Collaborators on the videos include Mary Lucier, Nick Fortunato, and Michael Macilli.

Communication between dancers includes verbal cues, and in place of music the dancers’ grunts and gasps are electronically recorded and amplified as well as the thuds of their landings and the clank and clatter of the stage equipment. With her newer choreography, Streb incorporates music as a part of the show being experienced by the audience. However, she has always upheld that "[m]ovement has its own timing, unrelated to music.” Streb has always tried to reach more than just the usual audiences for dance.

Streb has expressed her philosophy thus: “Go to the edge and peer over it. Be willing to get hurt, but not so hurt that you can’t come back again.” She has also said that, “Movement is causal; it’s a physical happening. You can stick a high C next to a low F-flat, whereas you couldn’t connect a move where you’re 30 feet in the air and falling, then skip a spot in space, land on the ground, and walk away. So I thought the arbiters of dance training and presentation were lying at the first basic step. Dance does not address its compositional methodology. It’s not true to the form. This form is movement.”

== Streb: Pop Action ==
Elizabeth Streb also has documented her achievements in the development of her dance style in her auto-biographical documentary film Streb: Pop Action (2002). This documentary includes extensive interviews with Elizabeth Streb, artistic director/choreographer of STREB, tracing the evolution of her choreographic style, and discussing her life and what motivated her throughout it. It also includes rehearsal scenes and clips of her performances.

== Surprises: STREB – One Extraordinary Day ==
On July 15, 2012, The Mayor of London and London 2012 Festival presented Surprises: Streb, one of several high-profile cultural events organised that summer to celebrate the 2012 Summer Olympic Games. Staged by LIFT, the London International Festival Of Theatre, Surprises: Streb was an event on a scale never before seen in the UK, thrilling spectators not only locally but across the planet.

Surprises: Streb was commissioned by the Mayor of London and the London 2012 Festival with funding from Arts Council England, the Department of Culture, Media and Sport and the National Lottery through the Olympic Lottery Distributor.

Streb with a team of 32 dancers (16 from her USA troupe and 16 UK dancers) performed seven "actions" throughout the day on the London cityscape, including abseiling front forward down City Hall, bungee jumping from the Millennium Bridge and attaching 32 dancers to every other spoke of the London Eye. An original commissioned music score by David Van Tieghem accompanied each event.

== BORN TO FLY: Elizabeth Streb vs. Gravity ==
In 2012, director Catherine Gund began production on a feature-length documentary chronicling the evolution of Streb's choreography and the STREB Extreme Action Company – entitled BORN TO FLY: Elizabeth Streb vs. Gravity. The film features footage of the One Extraordinary Day performance from July 1, 2012, filmed by renowned documentary filmmaker Albert Maysles, as well as archival footage from her over 30 years of practice and contemporary performance footage. The film was released in 2014.
