= Leslie Cockburn =

American investigative journalist and filmmaker

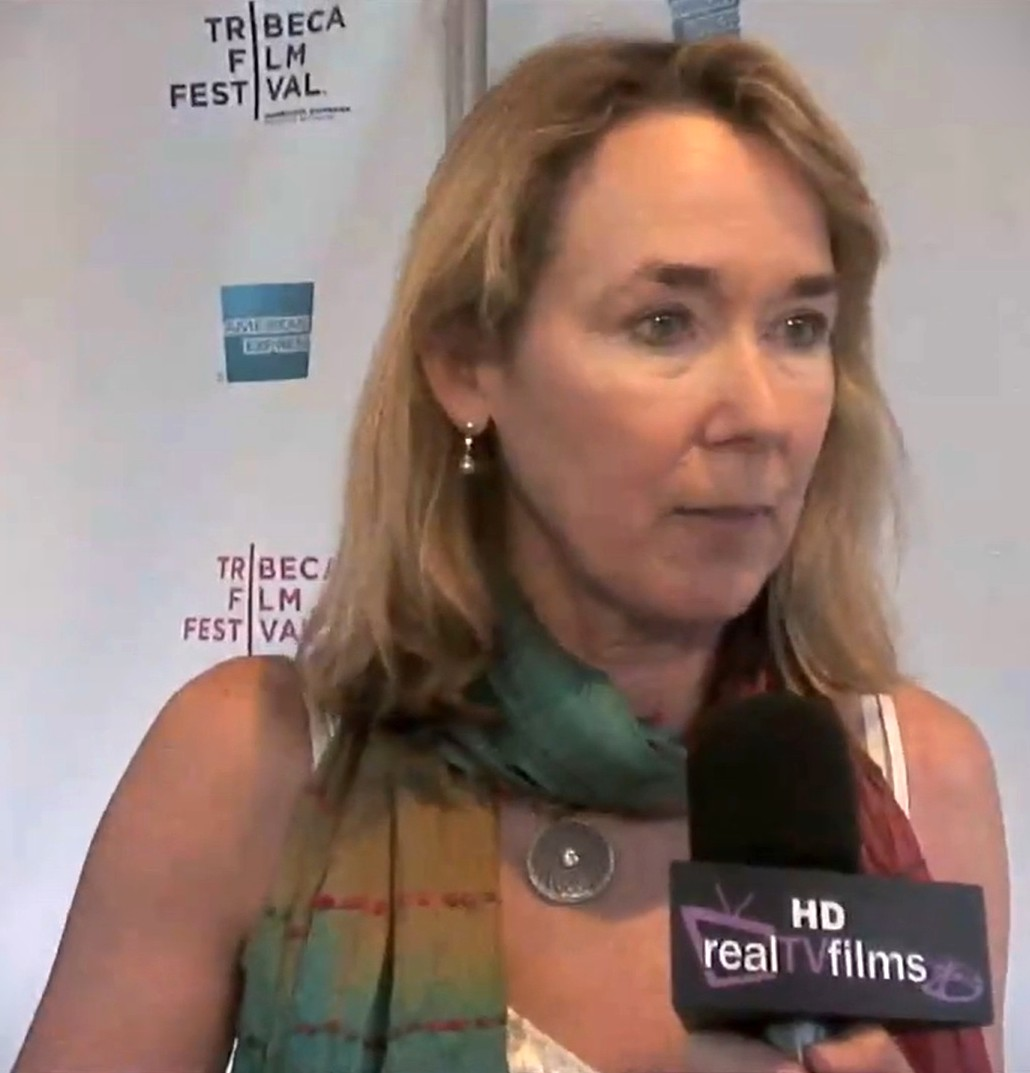
- Cockburn in 2009
- Born: Leslie Corkill Redlich; September 2, 1952 (age 74); San Mateo, California, U.S.
- Education: Yale University (BA); University of London (MA)
- Political party: Democratic
- Spouse: Andrew Cockburn (m. 1977)
- Children: 3, including Olivia

Leslie Corkill Cockburn (/ˈkoʊbərn/ KOH-bərn; née Redlich; September 2, 1952) is an American investigative journalist and filmmaker. Her investigative television segments have aired on CBS, NBC, PBS Frontline, and 60 Minutes. She has won an Emmy Award, The Hillman Prize, Alfred I. duPont–Columbia University Award, Robert F. Kennedy Journalism Award, and the George Polk Award.

Cockburn was the 2018 Democratic nominee for Virginia's 5th district in the U.S. House of Representatives, losing to Republican Denver Riggleman.

== Early life ==
Cockburn was born Leslie Corkill Redlich on September 2, 1952 in San Mateo, California and raised in Hillsborough, California. She is the daughter of Jeanne (née Fulcher) and Christopher Rudolph Redlich, a shipping magnate. She grew up in a family of hunters and supports gun control.

Leslie attended the Santa Catalina School. She then studied at Yale University, entering in the second year that women undergraduates were admitted to the university. She went on to earn a master's degree from the School of Oriental and African Studies at the University of London.

== Career ==
Cockburn is a former investigative journalist for NBC, CBS, and PBS Frontline. While living in London, she started working for NBC News. Among her early reports was an interview with Libyan leader Muammar Gaddafi. In 1978, Cockburn moved to CBS. During her career, she covered six wars including the U.S.-directed Contra War against Nicaragua.

=== Documentary films ===
In 1987, Cockburn began producing and reporting documentaries for PBS Frontline in collaboration with her husband, Andrew Cockburn. They created Guns, Drugs, and the CIA (1987), a documentary that claimed the CIA assisted and encouraged drug trafficking. In 1990, Cockburn produced and co-wrote "From the Killing Fields" with Peter Jennings and Tom Yellin for the ABC News documentary show Peter Jennings Reporting. The film alleged that the U.S. had covertly supported the Khmer Rouge in its return to power in Cambodia during a genocidal movement responsible for the deaths of millions in the 1970s.

In 1991, she and her husband produced the PBS Frontline documentary The War We Left Behind, which showed the effects of the Gulf War on Kurdish and Iraqi civilians. In 1997, Cockburn conceived and co-produced The Peacemaker, starring George Clooney and Nicole Kidman, a thriller positing a terrorist attack on New York City with a stolen nuclear weapon. In 1998, Cockburn served as Ferris Professor of Journalism at Princeton University. In 2000, she produced "America's Worst Nightmare," a 60 Minutes report on political instability in Pakistan and fundamentalist groups linked to the Taliban, a piece that was recognized as "strikingly prophetic" in receiving the Alfred I. duPont-Columbia University Award in 2001.

=== Dangerous Liaison: The Inside Story of the U.S.-Israeli Covert Relationship ===
External videos
- Booknotes interview with Leslie and Andrew Cockburn on Dangerous Liaison. C-SPAN, September 1, 1991.

In 1991, Cockburn and her husband, Andrew, published their first book together on the military and intelligence relationship between the U.S. and Israel after 1948. This book detailed how, over several decades, Israel had served U.S. interests both through espionage operations in the former Soviet Union as well as covert operations in Central America and other third-world regions where the U.S. was loath to intervene directly. The book also detailed Israeli nuclear activities, including U.S., assistance to its bomb-making program and Israeli cooperation with the South African apartheid regime's nuclear weapons program. Kirkus Reviews said it was "no thrown-together post-Gulf product, but an unflinching, fact-packed, closely reasoned exploration of our relations with our strongest ally in the Middle East." The Chicago Tribune said the book "should stand for a long time as the alpha and omega of the relationship between the United States and Israel...the Cockburns present the history in rich detail." In Israel, the response was more measured. Haaretz reviewed it favorably at length, calling it "credible".

=== American Casino ===
External videos
- Q&A interview with Leslie and Andrew Cockburn on American Casino. C-SPAN, January 3, 2010.

In 2009, Cockburn directed and co-produced (with her husband) her first feature documentary for theatrical release, American Casino. It follows the subprime mortgage crisis in the United States, which led to the greatest financial crisis since the Great Depression. Cockburn and her husband began filming in January 2008, and documented the financial machinations and miscalculations on Wall Street that produced the disaster, and its effects on several Baltimore homeowners struggling to stay afloat. The film premiered at New York's Tribeca Film Festival in April 2009. Variety called it a "searing expose of the subprime mortgage crisis [matching] Wall Street's numbers and graphics to the flesh-and-blood individuals whose lives have been devastated by the deliberate machinations of bankers and traders." The New Yorker said it was "a terrific documentary chronicling the subprime-mortgage mess and the financial collapse." The New York Times said it was "a meticulously structured film."

=== Awards and nominations ===
Cockburn has won The Hillman Prize (1984), the George Polk Award (2010), and the 1991 Robert F. Kennedy Journalism Award, along with Peter Jennings and Tom Yellin. Her work has received multiple Emmy nominations, and her 1998 documentary Yuri The Great won an Emmy Award in 1999.

== Political career ==
Cockburn was the 2018 Democratic nominee for Virginia's 5th congressional district in the United States House of Representatives. She announced her candidacy in July 2017, and secured a large majority of delegates over several rival candidates for the nomination in May 2018 at the district Democratic convention to succeed the outgoing Republican representative, Tom Garrett.

After winning her party's nomination, she lost to Republican nominee Denver Riggleman in the general election; Riggleman garnered 165,339 votes (53.2%) to Cockburn's 145,040 (46.7%). 547 votes (0.2%) were cast as write-ins.

== Personal life ==
Cockburn lives in Rappahannock County, Virginia, with her husband, Andrew Cockburn, a journalist and film producer. They married in San Francisco in 1977 and have co-authored several books. They have three children together: Chloe Francis Cockburn (April 3, 1979), Olivia Wilde (March 10, 1984), and Charles Philip Cockburn (January 31, 1993). She has four grandchildren.

Her parents-in-law were Claud and Patricia Cockburn. Cockburn had two brothers-in-law, the late Alexander Cockburn and Patrick Cockburn, and the mystery writer Sarah Caudwell was her half-sister in law. Tao Ruspoli is her former son-in-law. Journalists Laura Flanders and Stephanie Flanders are the daughters of her half-brother in law Michael Flanders.

== Bibliography ==
Books

- Out of Control: The Story of the Reagan Administration's Secret War in Nicaragua, the Illegal Arms Pipeline, and the Contra Drug Connection. New York: Atlantic Monthly Press, 1987.
- Dangerous Liaison: The Inside Story of the U.S.-Israeli Covert Relationship. with Andrew Cockburn. New York: HarperCollins, 1991. ISBN 0060164441.
- One Point Safe: The True Story of Russian Nuclear Security, with Andrew Cockburn. New York: Doubleday, 1997. ISBN 0385485603.
- Looking for Trouble: One Woman, Six Wars and a Revolution. New York: Anchor Books, 1998. ISBN 0385483554.
- Baghdad Solitaire (novel). Los Angeles, CA: Asahina & Wallace, 2013. ISBN 978-1940412009.

Book contributions

- "America's Secret War: Guns for Drugs." With Your Tongue Down My Throat. Granta, 22. Cambridge: Granta Publications, August 1987, pp. 151–165.
