= GRITradio =

GRITradio was a weekend radio show hosted by writer and long-time radio host Laura Flanders and produced by GRITtv. The show features in-depth interviews with activists, journalists, and writers.

The show began as The Laura Flanders Show and became RadioNation with Laura Flanders on January 7, 2006. The show airs weekend evenings on noncommercial radio stations across the country.

Prior to 2006, RadioNation was a double-half-hour, weekly program hosted by Marc Cooper, produced in collaboration with Pacifica Radio.

== Guest hosts ==
- Ned Sublette
- Jessica Ward

== Staff ==
- Host: Laura Flanders
- Senior Producer: Steve Rosenfeld
- Producer: Christabel Nsiah-Buadi
