= American Casino (film) =

- Directed by: Leslie Cockburn
- Written by: Andrew Cockburn; Leslie Cockburn
- Produced by: Andrew Cockburn; Leslie Cockburn; Tao Ruspoli
- Edited by: Peter Eliscu
- Music by: Amotion; B. Dazzle; Kojo Hotflow; Moby
- Production company: Table Rock Films
- Distributed by: Argot Pictures
- Release dates: May 2, 2009 (Tribeca); August 14, 2009 (United States)
- Running time: 89 minutes
- Country: United States
- Language: English
- Box office: $46,514

American Casino is a 2009 documentary film about the American subprime mortgage crisis. It is directed and produced by Leslie Cockburn with Andrew Cockburn as co-producer.

The film premiered at the Tribeca Film Festival in New York City on May 2, 2009, and opened at the Roxie Theater in San Francisco on August 21 and at the Film Forum in New York City on September 2. The film features Phil Gramm, Henry Paulson, Ben Bernanke, Henry Waxman, Baltimore mayor Sheila Dixon, and financial writer Mark Pittman. As of September 29, 2009 the film has grossed $23,974 (~$33,969 in 2024).

== Critical reception ==
Variety called the documentary a "searing expose" and Slant magazine described it as "revelatory."
