= Laura Flanders =

English journalist (born 1961)

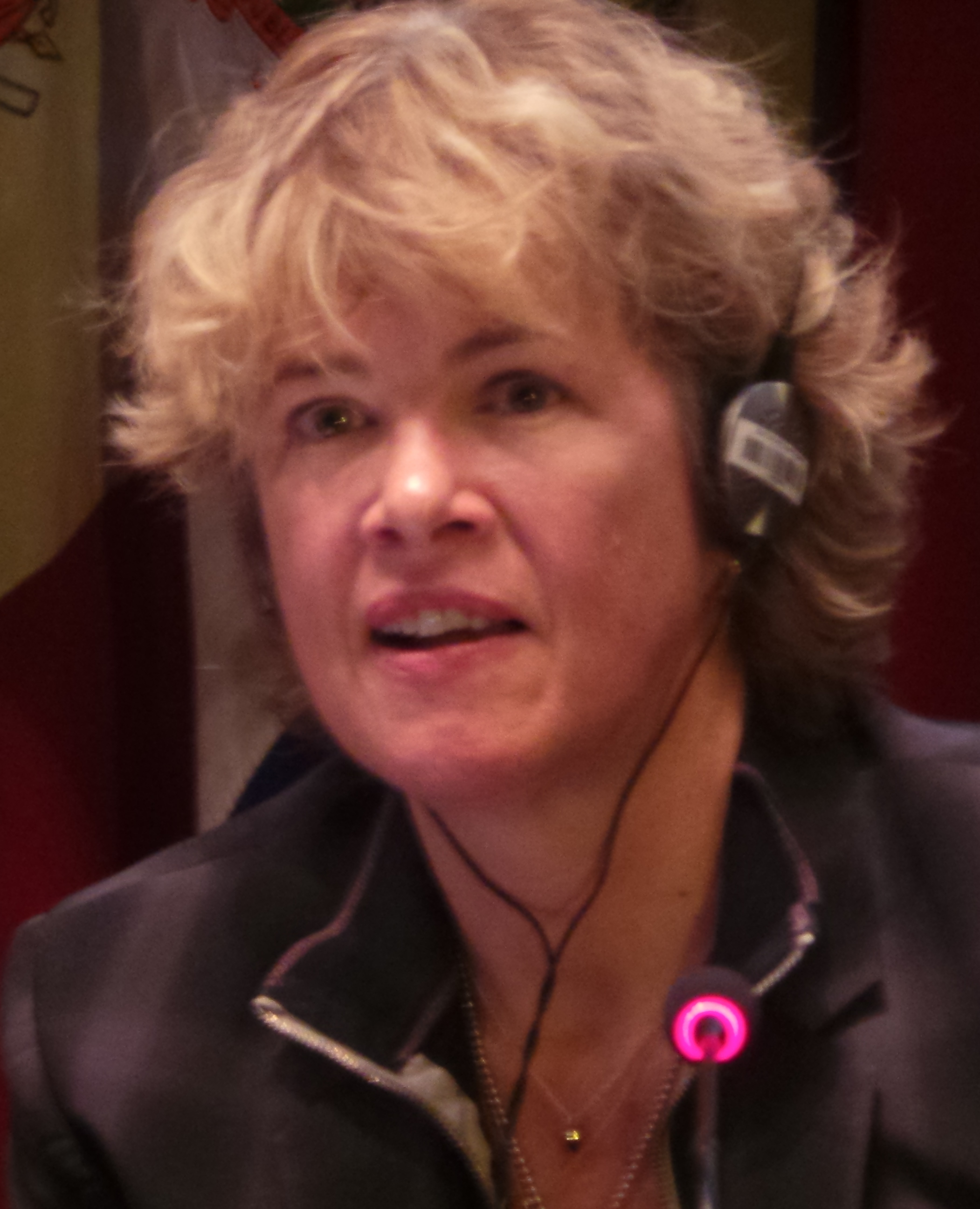
- Flanders in 2015
- Born: 5 December 1961 (age 64); London, England
- Education: Barnard College
- Occupations: Journalist, author, broadcaster
- Partner: Elizabeth Streb
- Parent(s): Michael Flanders; Claudia Cockburn
- Website: lauraflanders.org

Laura Flanders (born 5 December 1961) is an English broadcast journalist living in the United States who presents the weekly, long-form interview show The Laura Flanders Show. Flanders has described herself as a "lefty person".

== Early life and education ==
Flanders is the daughter of the British comic songwriter and broadcaster Michael Flanders and the American-born Claudia Cockburn, who was the daughter of the radical British journalist Claud Cockburn and American author Hope Hale Davis. Claud Cockburn's sons, Alexander, Andrew and Patrick Cockburn, all journalists, are Flanders's uncles, and author Lydia Davis is her aunt. Her sister, Stephanie Flanders, is a former BBC journalist. Actress Olivia Wilde is her cousin.

Flanders was raised in the Kensington district of London Her father died when she was 13 years old, and she was sent to live with her grandfather, Claud Cockburn.

Flanders emigrated to the United States in 1980, at age 19. She graduated from Barnard College in 1985 with a degree in history and women's studies.

== Career ==
Flanders was founding director of the women's desk at the media watch group Fairness and Accuracy in Reporting (FAIR), and for a decade produced and hosted CounterSpin, FAIR's syndicated radio program. In January 1993, she appeared on the ABC Good Morning America program as a spokesperson for FAIR to discuss how domestic violence increases during the annual Super Bowl.

Flanders hosted the weekday radio show Your Call on KALW, before starting the Saturday/Sunday evening Laura Flanders Show on Air America Radio in 2004. It became the weekly one-hour Radio Nation in 2007, and a daily TV show on Free Speech TV, "GRITtv with Laura Flanders" in 2008. That show aired for three years on Free Speech TV before moving to KCET/Linktv and teleSUR, as a weekly program. Flanders is a contributing writer for The Nation, and Yes Magazine and has also contributed to In These Times, The Progressive and Ms., magazine.

She has authored six books, including Blue Grit: True Democrats Take Back Politics from the Politicians (Penguin Press 2007); Bushwomen: Tales of a Cynical Species (Verso, 2004), a study of the women in George W. Bush's cabinet; and a collection of essays, Real Majority, Media Minority: The Cost of Sidelining Women in Reporting (1997). She edited "At the Tea Party...." (O/R Books 2010) and The W Effect: Sexual Politics in the Age of Bush (2004) and contributed to The Contenders, (Seven Stories, 2008) among others.

=== The Laura Flanders Show ===
A 2015 episode of The Laura Flanders Show with Cornel West

Flanders began hosting and executive producing The Laura Flanders Show in 2008. The program is a weekly 30-minute news and public affairs show that explores actionable models for creating a better world by reporting on the people and movements driving systemic change. Its tagline is, "Where the people who say it can't be done take a back seat to the people who are doing it."

The Laura Flanders Show originally aired on Free Speech TV and teleSUR. In 2018, the program became a coproduction with CUNY TV. In 2019, it was picked up for distribution by American Public Television, and in 2020, it began airing on PBS stations across the United States, including in 20 of the country's top 25 television markets.

== Personal life ==
Flanders is a lesbian. In 2019, she married her partner of 30 years, choreographer Elizabeth Streb.

Flanders currently resides in Smallwood, New York.

== Awards ==
Award	Year	Organization
Lannan Cultural Freedom Fellowship for her work in independent media	2019	Lannan Foundation
Pat Mitchell Lifetime Achievement Award	2019	Women's Media Center
Urban Journalist of the Year	2019	City Limits
Izzy Award for outstanding achievement in independent media	2019	Park Center for Independent Media
Most Valuable Multimedia Maker	2018	The Nation Magazine's 2018 Progressive Honor Roll
Communicator of the Year	2013	NY Metro Labor Press Council
Stonewall Award	2013	Stonewall Community Foundation
