= Kill Chain: Drones and the Rise of High-Tech Assassins =

2015 book by Andrew Cockburn

- First edition
- Author: Andrew Cockburn
- Language: English
- Published: 2015
- Publisher: Verso Books
- Publication place: United Kingdom
- Media type: Print (paperback)
- Pages: 320
- ISBN: 9781781689462

Kill Chain: Drones and the Rise of High-Tech Assassins is a 2015 non-fiction book written by British journalist Andrew Cockburn.

== Synopsis ==
The book explores the use of drone warfare by the United States government from its origins. It incorporates an overview of the rise and development of drone warfare and its use in global military and police actions. The efficacy of drone warfare in combating terrorism and organized crime is questioned, along with the ethical drawbacks of drone warfare.

== Reception ==
Karen J. Greenberg of The Washington Post gave the book a positive review, writing that it "pulls back the camera to provide a wider historical perspective, setting the policy of targeted killing via drones within the larger context of the American military-industrial complex." In The Scotsman Tim Cornwell described the book as "well-reasoned and sometimes dense critique of drone warfare" which turns "into finely honed outrage". The book was also reviewed by Ed O'Loughlin in The Irish Times, who praised its analysis of the practical shortcomings of drone warfare, writing that Cockburn "assembles a formidable battery of insider sources to support his thesis."
