= Henry Arthur Blake =

British colonial administrator

Sir Henry Arthur Blake GCMG DL JP FRGS
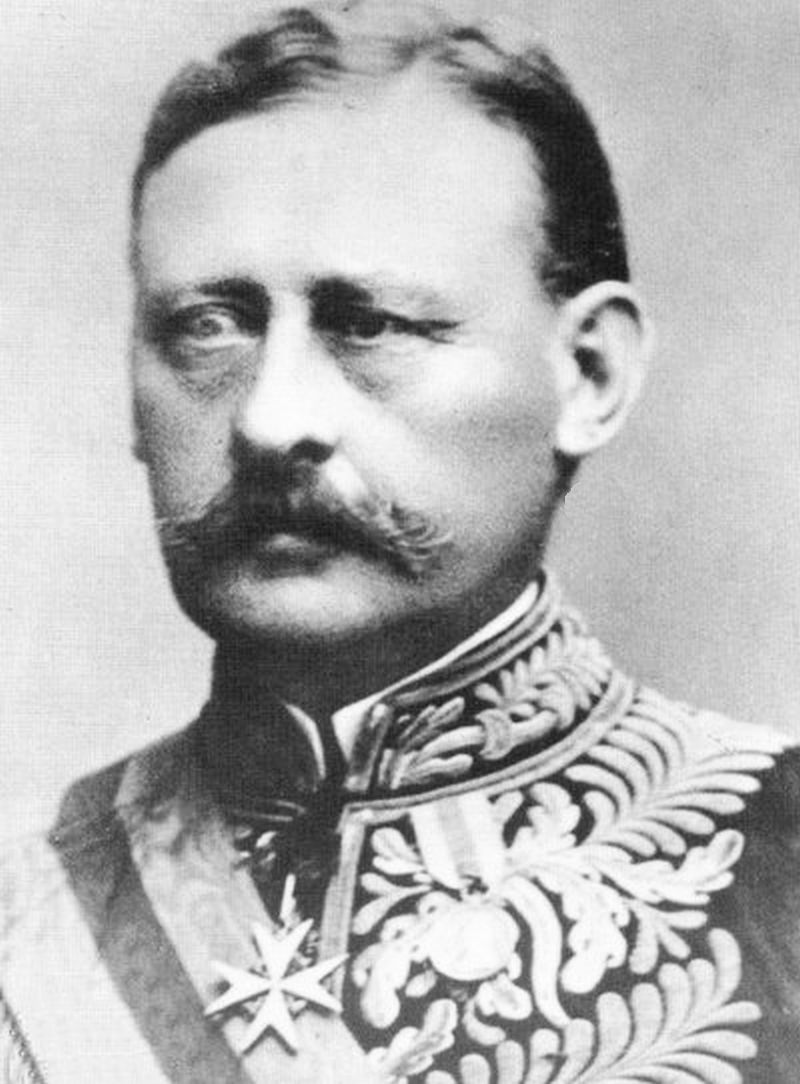

46th Governor of The Bahamas
- In office 4 January 1884 – 1887
- Monarch: Victoria
- Preceded by: Sir Charles Cameron Lees
- Succeeded by: Sir Ambrose Shea

55th Governor of Newfoundland
- In office 1887 – December 1888
- Monarch: Victoria
- Preceded by: Sir G W Des Voeux
- Succeeded by: Sir John T N O'Brien

65th Governor of Jamaica
- In office 23 December 1888 – 1898
- Monarch: Victoria
- Preceded by: William Clive Justice (Ag)
- Succeeded by: Henry Jardine Hallowes (Ag)

12th Governor of Hong Kong
- In office 25 November 1898 – 21 November 1903
- Monarchs: Victoria; Edward VII
- Lieutenant Governor: Sir Wilsone Black; Sir William Gascoigne
- Colonial Secretary: Sir Stewart Lockhart; Sir Francis Henry May
- Preceded by: Sir William Robinson
- Succeeded by: Sir Matthew Nathan

19th Governor of British Ceylon
- In office 3 December 1903 – 11 July 1907
- Monarch: Edward VII
- Preceded by: Sir Everard im Thurn (Ag)
- Succeeded by: Hugh Clifford (Ag)

Personal details
- Born: 8 January 1840 Limerick, Ireland
- Died: 13 February 1918 (aged 78) Myrtle Grove, Youghal, County Cork, Ireland
- Resting place: Myrtle Grove, Youghal, County Cork, Ireland
- Spouses: Jeannie Irwin (m. 1862; died 1866) Edith Bernal Osborne, Lady Blake (m. 1874)
- Children: 3
- Profession: Constable, magistrate, colonial administrator

Chinese name
- Chinese: 卜力
Transcriptions
Yue: Cantonese
- Jyutping: buk1 lik6

Viceregal styles of Sir Henry Arthur Blake
- Reference style: His Excellency
- Spoken style: Your Excellency

Sir Henry Arthur Blake GCMG DL JP FRGS (Chinese: 卜力; Sidney Lau: Buk^{1} Lik^{6}; 8 January 1840 – 23 February 1918) was an Irish-born British colonial administrator who held the governorships of six British colonies over the course of his career.

== Early life, family and career ==
Blake was born in Limerick, Ireland. He was the son of Peter Blake of Corbally Castle (c. 1805 – bur. St. Ann's, Dublin, 19 November 1850), a Galway-born county Inspector of the Irish Constabulary, and wife (m. Mobarnan, County Tipperary) Jane Lane (Lanespark, County Tipperary, 5 March 1819 – ?), daughter of John Lane of Lanespark, County Tipperary, and paternal grandson of Peter Blake of Corbally Castle, County Galway (? – 1842, bur. Peter’s Well, County Galway) and wife (m. 14 May 1800) Mary Browne, daughter of The Hon. John Browne and wife Mary Cocks and paternal granddaughter of John Browne, 1st Earl of Altamont, and wife Anne Gore. He was included among the descendants the Blakes of Corbally Castle, Kilmoylan, County Galway, the descendants of Peter Blake (? – 1712), who was granted the lands of Corbally, Kilmoylan, County Galway, on 20 December 1697, and wife Magdeline Martin, the Blakes. Peter Blake was a son of Sir Richard Blake and wife Gyles Kirwan.

Blake started out as a clerk in the Bank of Ireland but lasted only 18 months before resigning and commencing a cadetship in the Irish Constabulary in 1857. He became a special inspector two years later. In 1876, he was appointed Resident Magistrate to Tuam, an especially disturbed district in the west of Ireland, where he was noted as judicious and active. In 1882, he was promoted to Special Resident Magistrate.

== Early colonial services ==
In 1884, Blake was made Governor of Bahamas, a position he held until 1887. He was appointed to Queensland in 1886 but resigned without entering the administration, following an imbroglio between Secretary of State for the Colonies, Lord Knutsford, and the premier of Queensland, Sir Thomas M'Ilwraith, on the appointment. In 1887, he moved to Newfoundland, where he was governor until the end of 1888, being knighted on 7 November that year. In 1889 he became the Captain-General and Governor of Jamaica. His term was extended in 1894 and 1896, at the request of Legislature and public bodies of the island, until 1897.

== Governor of Hong Kong ==
On 25 November 1898, Blake was appointed governor of Hong Kong, a position he held until November 1903. Five months before he arrived in Hong Kong, the British government negotiated an agreement with the Qing government which leased the New Territories to British Hong Kong for 99 years. During his tenure, Blake sent in colonial administrators to the New Territories to assert control over the local punti clans.

The clans resisted the British takeover of the New Territories, resulting in the outbreak of the Six-Day War; British forces under William Gascoigne defeated the punti clans, although Blake adopting an amiable co-operation policy to prevent further unrest and allowed the clans to retain their traditional laws and customs in regards to land inheritance, land usage and marriage.

Blake left Hong Kong immediately after he attended the laying of the foundation stone of the Supreme Court building (Legislative Council of Hong Kong from 1985 to 2011) on 12 November 1903.

== Post-Hong Kong ==
Blake was appointed Governor of Ceylon at the end of his tenure in Hong Kong in 1903, and he served in that capacity until 1907. This was his last post in the Colonial Service. A freshly retired Blake impressed George Morrison with his bitterness at not landing a Privy Council sinecure in gratitude for his 41 years' public service.

The Blakes retired to Myrtle Grove in Youghal, County Cork, where they both died and were buried.

== Personal life ==
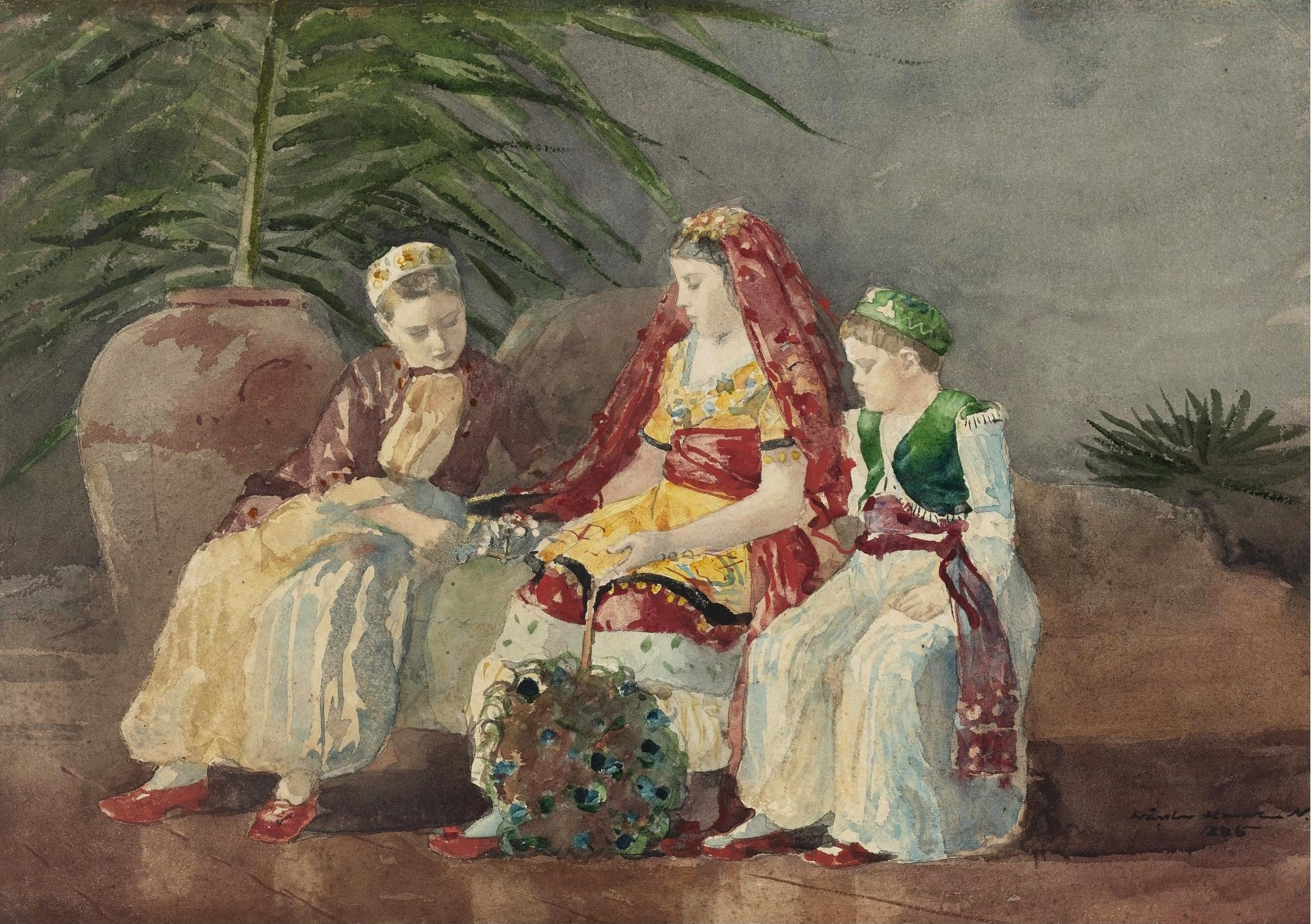
Winslow Homer's Children Under a Palm Tree

Blake married twice: Jeannie Irwin in 1862 (she died in 1866), and Edith Bernal Osborne in Ireland, on 7 February 1874 (she was the daughter of MP Ralph Bernal Osborne). He had two sons Maurice, Arthur, and one daughter Olive, who married John Bernard Arbuthnot. During his period as Governor of The Bahamas, a watercolour of his three children, Children Under a Palm, was painted by Winslow Homer. The painting was subsequently featured on the BBC TV programme, Fake or Fortune?

== Honours and arms ==
- Companion of the Order of St Michael and St George (CMG), 1887
- Knight Commander of the Order of St Michael and St George (KCMG), 1888
- Knight Grand Cross of the Order of St Michael and St George (GCMG), 1897
- Knight of Justice of Order of St. John of Jerusalem
- Fellow of Royal Geographical Society (FRGS)
- JP
- DL
- Fellow of Royal Colonial Institute (FRCI)
- Fellow of Institute of Directors (FIoD)
- Honorary Colonel of Ceylon Mounted Rifles
- District Grand Master Ceylon Freemasons
- Member, Council Royal Dublin Society
- Honorary Member, Royal Zoological Society, London

Coat of arms of Henry Arthur Blake

Notes
Confirmed 6 February 1896 by Arthur Edward Vicars, Ulster King of Arms.
Crest
On a wreath of the colours a cat-a-mountain passant guardant Proper charged with a crescent as in the arms.
Escutcheon
Quarterly 1st & 4th Argent a fret Gules in chief a crescent of the last a crescent for difference (Blake) 2nd & 3rd Sable three lions passant between four bendlets Argent in chief a fleur de lys of the last for difference (Browne).
Motto
Virtus Sola Nobilitat

== Legacy ==
The community of Blaketown in Newfoundland and Labrador was named in his honour when he was the Governor of Newfoundland. Blake Garden, Blake Pier (卜公碼頭) and Blake Block (now within the People's Liberation Army Hong Kong Headquarters) are named after him.

The Bauhinia blakeana, discovered in Hong Kong around 1880, was named after him (Blake shared his wife's interest in botany). It became an emblem of Hong Kong in 1965 and has been the official emblem from 1 July 1997. It appears on the flag of Hong Kong and its currency.

The John Crow Mountains in Jamaica were renamed the Blake Mountains in 1890 but the name did not stick.

== Publications ==
- McGrath, Terence, pseud. [i.e. Sir Henry Arthur Blake.] 1880, Pictures from Ireland. Kegan Paul & Co.: London, 1880. Available from archive.org
- "Ceylon" . The Empire and the century. London: John Murray. 1905. pp. 707–15.

== See also ==
- History of Hong Kong
- The Tribes of Galway – see Blake

== Sources ==
- Dictionary of Irish Biography, pp. 583–84, Cambridge, 2010.
- Biography at Government House The Governorship of Newfoundland and Labrador

Government offices
Preceded by Sir Charles Cameron Lees	Governor of the Bahamas; 1884–1887	Succeeded by Ambrose Shea
Preceded by Sir William Des Vœux	Colonial Governor of Newfoundland; 1887–1889	Succeeded by Sir John Terence Nicholls O'Brien
Preceded by Sir Henry Wylie Norman	Governor of Jamaica; 1889–1898	Succeeded by Augustus William Lawson Hemming
Preceded by Major-General Wilsone Black, Acting Administrator	Governor of Hong Kong; 1898–1903	Succeeded by Sir Francis Henry May, Acting Administrator
Preceded by Sir Everard im Thurn acting governor	Governor of Ceylon; 1903–1907	Succeeded by Hugh Clifford acting governor
