= Myrtle Grove, Youghal =

Residential building in Youghal

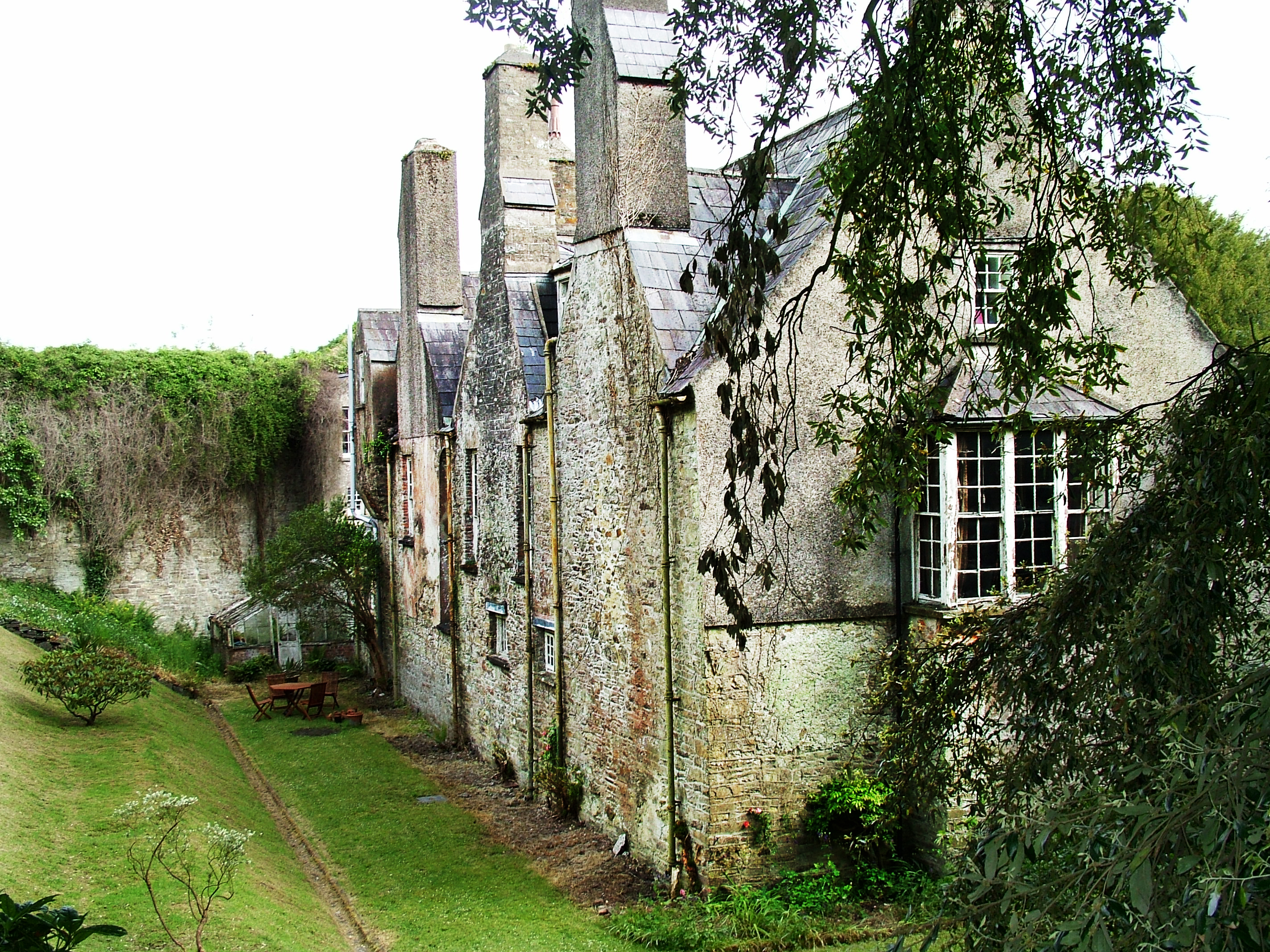
Myrtle Grove

Myrtle Grove is an Elizabethan gabled house in Youghal, County Cork, Ireland. The house is notable as a rare example in Ireland of a 16th-century unfortified house. It is situated close to the Collegiate Church of St Mary Youghal.

== History ==
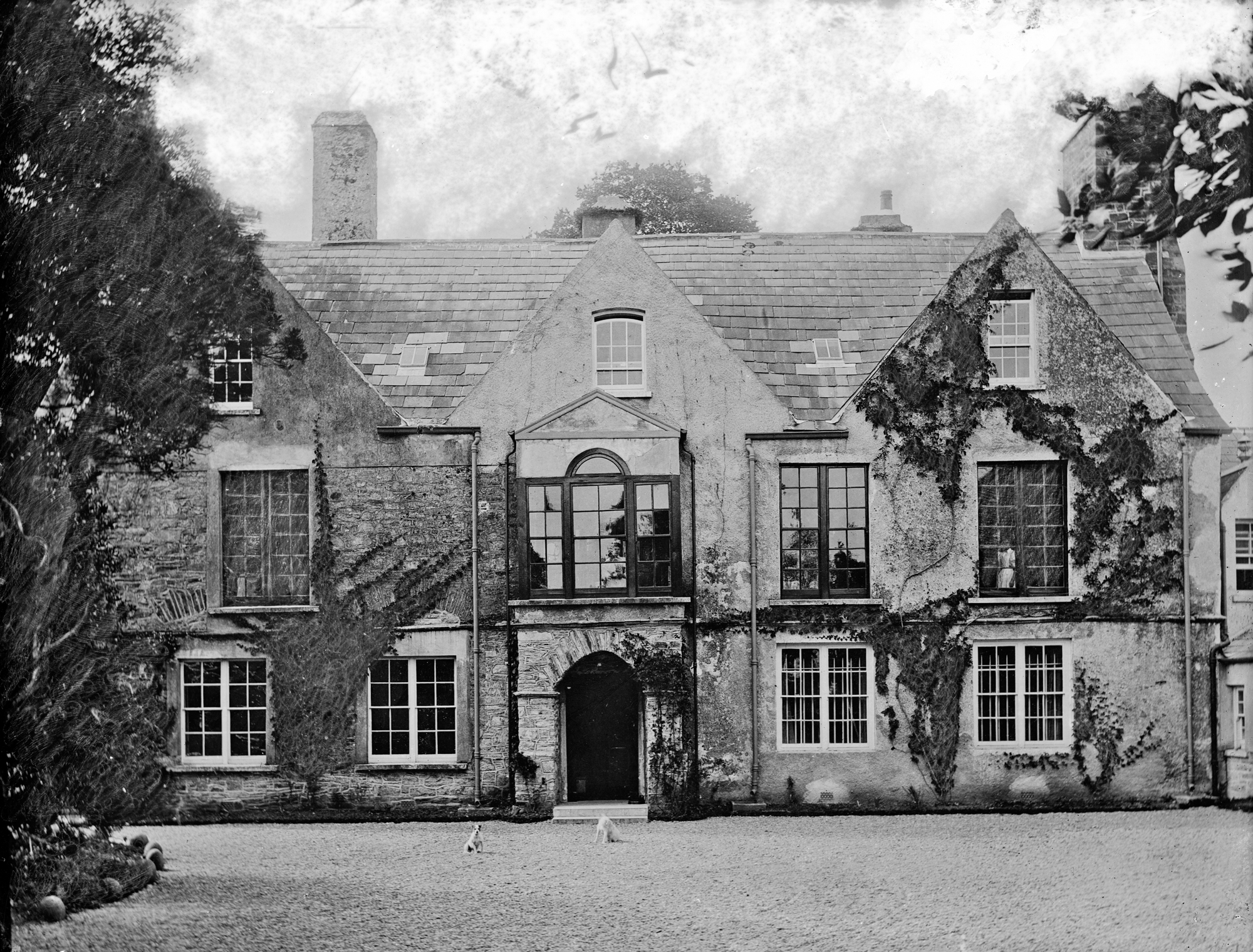
Myrtle Grove in the early 20th century

It was home for Sir Walter Raleigh from 1588 to 1589. Myrtle Grove's South gable is where Edmund Spenser is reputed to have written part of his poem The Faerie Queene, although some historians question this story. The house was acquired by Richard Boyle, 1st Earl of Cork in 1602 from Sir Walter Raleigh's Irish estate. Boyle leased it to his protege Sir Lawrence Parsons, the judge of the Irish Admiralty Court. Though remodelled twice it remains one of the best-known examples of a Tudor house in Ireland. The house was acquired by the Hayman family in the 18th century.

In the 20th century, it was the home of Sir Henry Arthur Blake and Lady Blake. At this time, the building housed "the best collection of West Indian paintings and sketches". The Blakes lived here until their deaths. They were buried in the garden.

The house remains in private ownership and is closed to the public.

== Legends ==
The house is reputed to be where potatoes were first planted in Ireland or in Europe. The latter is unlikely, however, as potatoes were present only in Spain in 1536. There is a similar legend stating that Myrtle Grove was where tobacco was first smoked by Walter Raleigh.

"Myrtle Grove", a poem written in Spenserian stanzas by James Reiss, and published in Fugue magazine (the University of Idaho) in 2007, develops the legend that Edmund Spenser wrote portions of his great epic, The Faerie Queene, under an aureole window in the South gable of Raleigh's house.
