= Bob Ivry =

American financial journalist

Robert Ivry is an American financial journalist, and staff reporter for Bloomberg News.

He worked for the San Francisco Bay Guardian, San Francisco Examiner, and Bergen Record, of Hackensack, New Jersey. His work appeared in Esquire, Washington Post Book World, Popular Science, Maxim, Spin, Details, Self, and Ploughshares.

== Awards ==
- 2014 Gerald Loeb Award for New Services for "Rigging the World's Biggest Market"
- 2010 Hillman Prize
- 2009 George Polk Award
- 2008 Gerald Loeb Award for News Services for "Wall Street's Faustian Bargain"
