= Daly Castle =

Castle ruin in Galway, Ireland

Coordinates: 53.1301°N 8.718°W

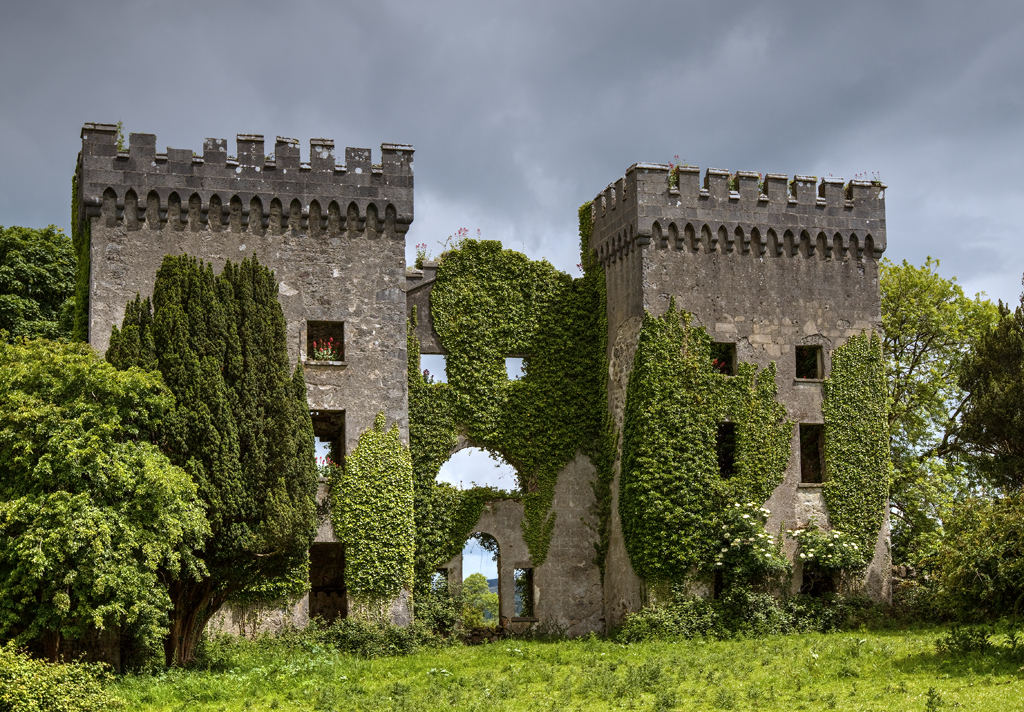
Façade of Daly Castle

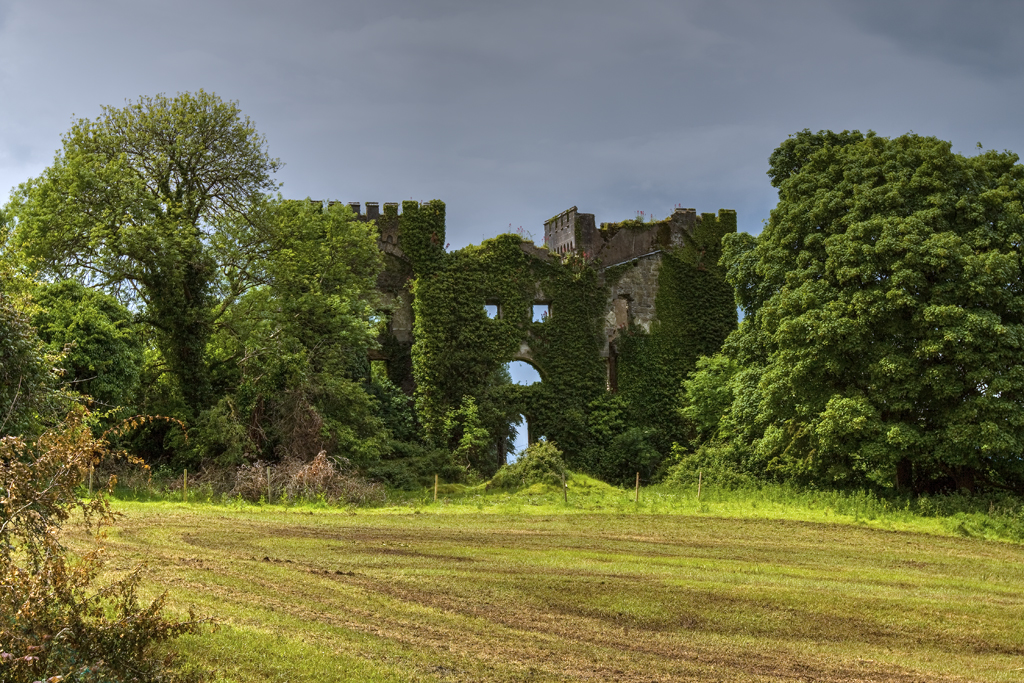
Eastern side

Daly Castle or Castledaly, formerly known as "Corbally", is a castle ruin located in County Galway, Ireland. It is in the townland of Castledaly (Irish: An Corrbhaile).

== History ==
From the late 16th century, the castle belonged to the Blake family and it was called Corbally. The Blake family is one of the fourteen Tribes of Galway, the famous merchant families dominant in Galway from the 13th to 19th centuries. In 1829, the castle was acquired by Peter Daly of the Daly family from the profits made from sugar plantations in Jamaica. He remodeled the building and added a façade. The castle was renamed to Castledaly, and it became a seat of James Daly from 1894.

Within the castle's demesne is St. Theresa's church, built c. 1850 with contributions from the Daly family. Near the church are memorial tablets of the Daly family and the family mausoleum.

== Architecture ==
Today, only the façade of the castle remains, while the rest are ruins. The archaeological significance of the ruins comes primarily from the incorporation of the older tower house into the structure.
