= Newtown Anner House =

Coordinates: 52°22′20″N 7°38′32″W

- Interactive map of the Newtown Anner House area

General information
- Type: Country House
- Location: Clonmel, County Tipperary, Ireland
- Completed: 1829

Newtown Anner or Newtownanner House is a historic country house in Clonmel, County Tipperary, previously a residence of the Osborne baronets.

== Description ==
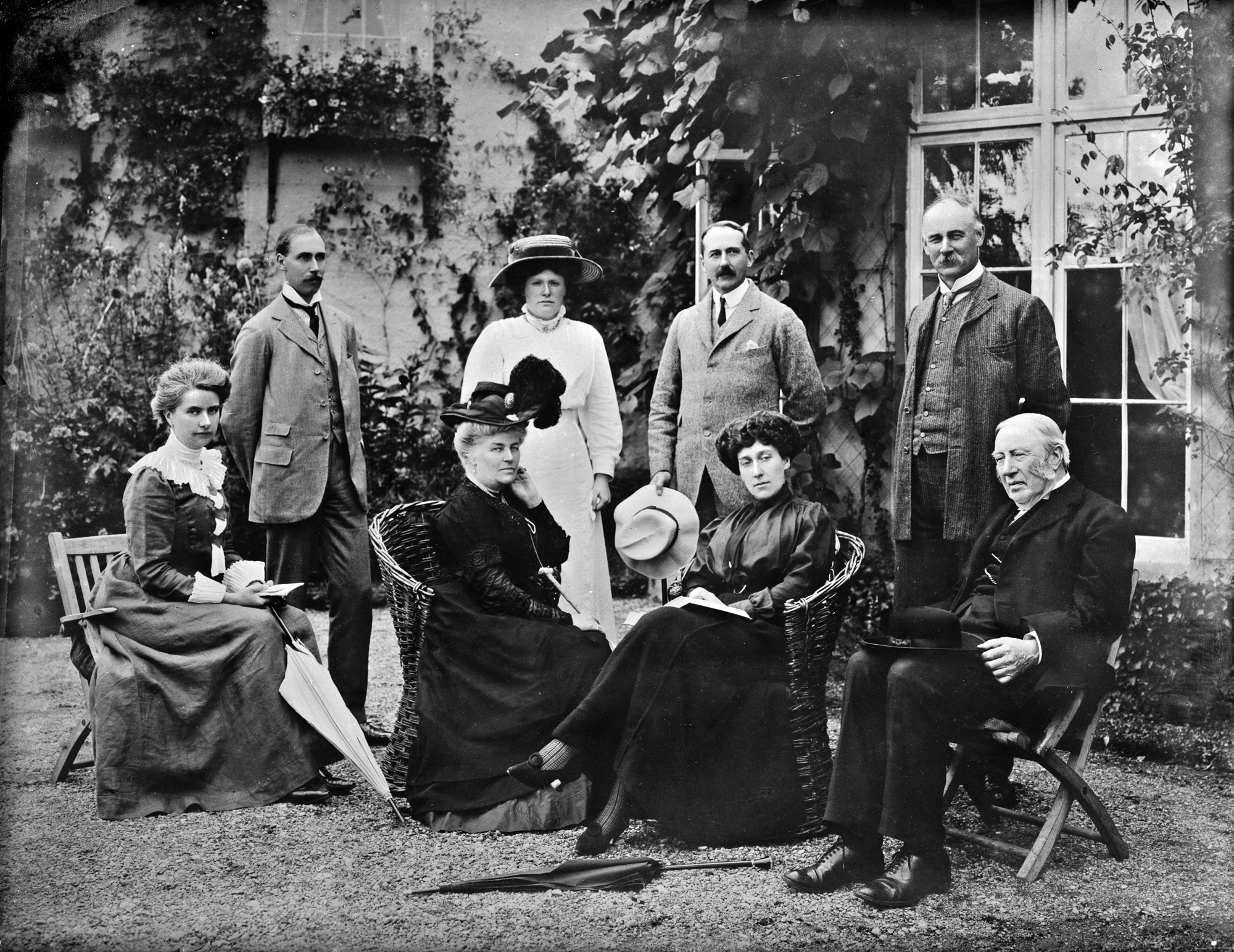
The Duchess of St. Albans and her guests, likely at Newtown Anner House

Newtown Anner House is a country house built in 1829. The house was a home of the Osbourne family and the Duke of St Albans. In the middle of the 20th century it was sold, and today the house is in private ownership and not open to the public.

The wings of this house are unusual, as they are taller than the central block. The grounds of the house include a well-preserved walled garden, a ruined temple, and a shell grotto.
