= Beachcomber =

A beachcomber is a person who practices beachcombing.

Beachcomber or Beachcombers may also refer to:

== Arts and entertainment ==
- The Beachcomber (1915 film), an American drama
- The Beachcomber (1938 film), starring Charles Laughton and also known as Vessel of Wrath
- The Beachcomber (1954 film), starring Robert Newton and Donald Sinden
- The Beachcomber (TV series), a British series premiering in 1962
- The Beachcombers, a Canadian TV series premiering in 1972 ending in 1990; also airing as "Beachcombers"
- Beach Combers, a 1936 Walter Lantz cartoon

== People and characters ==
- Beachcomber (Transformers), the name of multiple characters in the Transformers universe
- Beachcomber (My Little Pony), a character from My Little Pony
- Beachcomber (pen name), a nom de plume used by several British humorous columnists, chiefly J. B. Morton
- Don the Beachcomber, stage name of Donn Beach, proprietor of what is considered to be one of the earliest known examples of a tiki bar.

== Places ==
- Beachcomber, Victoria, Australia
- Beachcomber (island), one of the Mamanuca Islands in Fiji

== Groups, companies, organizations ==
- The Beachcombers (band), a London based band
- Long Beach Beachcombers, Long Beach, California, US; a baseball team
- Santa Cruz Beachcombers, Santa Cruz, California, US; a baseball team
- Beachcomber Resorts & Hotels, a Mauritius-based hospitality company
- Beachcomber Hot Tubs, a Canadian-based hot tub company
- Don the Beachcomber, a chain of tiki bars first established in Los Angeles, California, US in 1933

== Transportation and vehicles ==
- Beachcomber 6.5, a class of yacht
- Beachcomber 25, a class of sailboat
- Beachcomber (bus), a pair of services in Yorkshire
- Mini Beachcomber, a 2010 concept car released by MINI

== Other uses ==
- Beach Comber, a carrier pigeon

== See also ==
- Beachcomber... By the Way, a 1990s BBC radio programme
- The New Beachcombers, a 2000s Canadian TV show
- Comb (disambiguation)
- Beach (disambiguation)
