= The Heat Is On =

The Heat Is On may refer to:

- The Heat Is On (album), 1975 album from the Isley Brothers
- "The Heat Is On" (Agnetha Fältskog song), late 1970s/early 1980s hit for Noosha Fox and Agnetha Fältskog
- "The Heat Is On" (Glenn Frey song), a 1984 hit song for Glenn Frey from the Beverly Hills Cop soundtrack
- "The Heat Is On", a song by La Bouche from the album Sweet Dreams
- "The Heat Is On!", an episode of the television series On the Yorkshire Buses
- The Heat Is On, 1998 Ross Gelbspan book on global warming, including global warming denial

== See also ==
- The Heat's On, a 1943 American musical movie
