= Whittles =

Coach tour operator based in Kidderminster, England

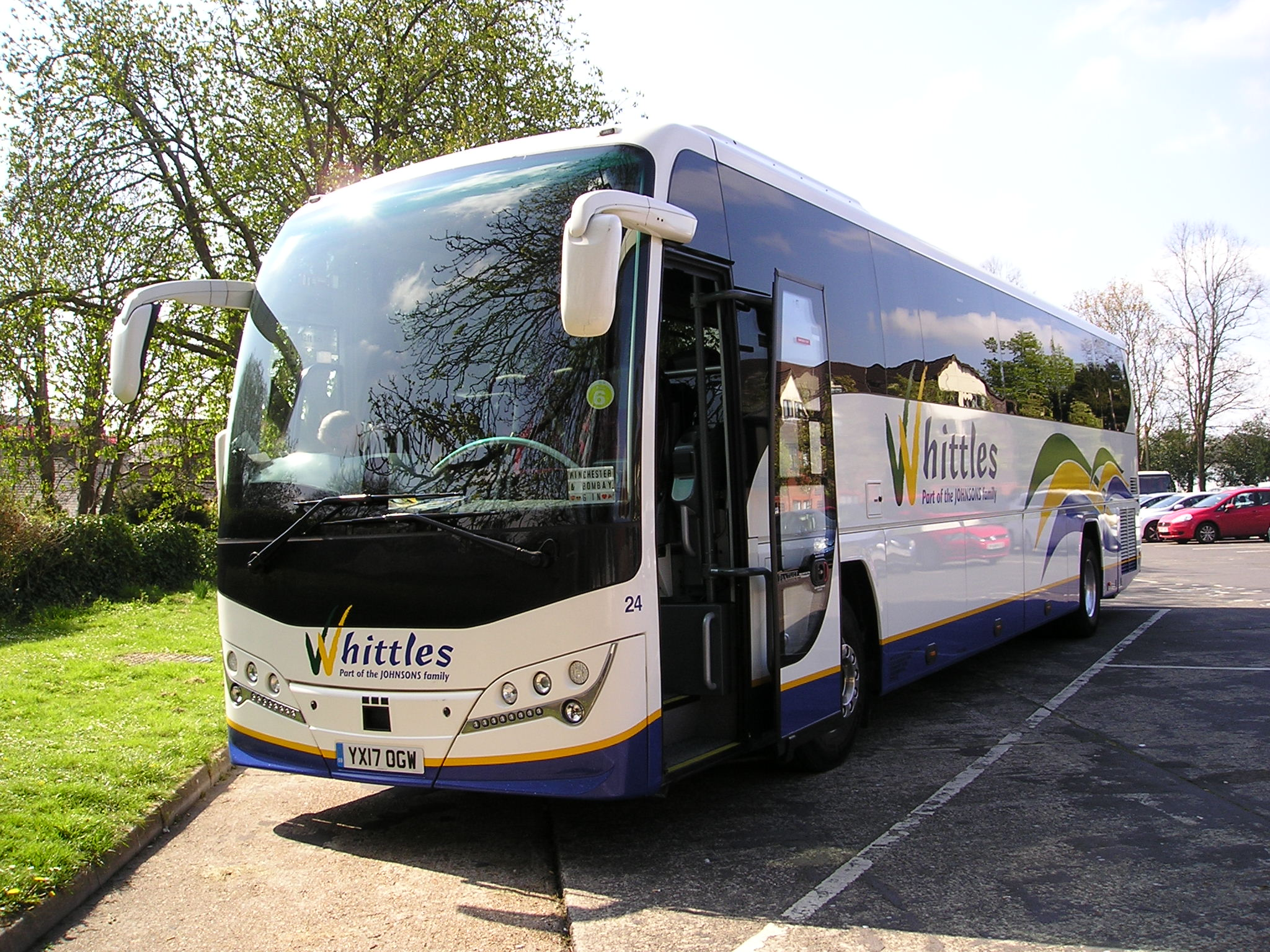
- Whittles Plaxton Panther bodied Volvo B8R in April 2019
- Parent: Johnsons Coach & Bus Travel
- Founded: 1926
- Headquarters: Kidderminster
- Service type: Coach operator
- Depots: 1
- Website: www.whittlecoach.co.uk

Whittles is a coach tour operator based in Kidderminster, England.

== History ==
Whittles was founded in 1926 in Highley, taking miners to and from villages to the coal pits, and hauling coal in between shift changes. The founder was J. T. Whittle, and he ran the business of J. T. Whittle & Son with members of his family. Later, three of them – J. T., F. W. and G. E. Whittle – formed a partnership to own the business. The partners became G. E., R. A. and D. L. Whittle in 1964. G. E. - George - Whittle died in 1970.

In January 1975, G. E. Whittle's daughter and an heir to his fortune, 17 year old Lesley Whittle was kidnapped and killed by murderer and armed robber Donald Neilson, dubbed "The Black Panther " by the British Press.

In October 1980, it commenced operating express services from Bridgnorth and Kidderminster to London under the Goldhawk brand. In 1981 it began operating these services in an alliance with National Express. In 1990, Narburgh Coaches of Alveley was purchased with 16 vehicles, taking the fleet to 53.

In January 2004, the business was purchased by East Yorkshire Motor Services with 49 vehicles. In December 2014, the coach business was sold to Johnsons Coach & Bus Travel with nine coaches.

The contracted National Express services were taken over by National Express, while the local bus services ceased on 5 January 2015.
