= Beachcomber 6.5 =

Class of yacht

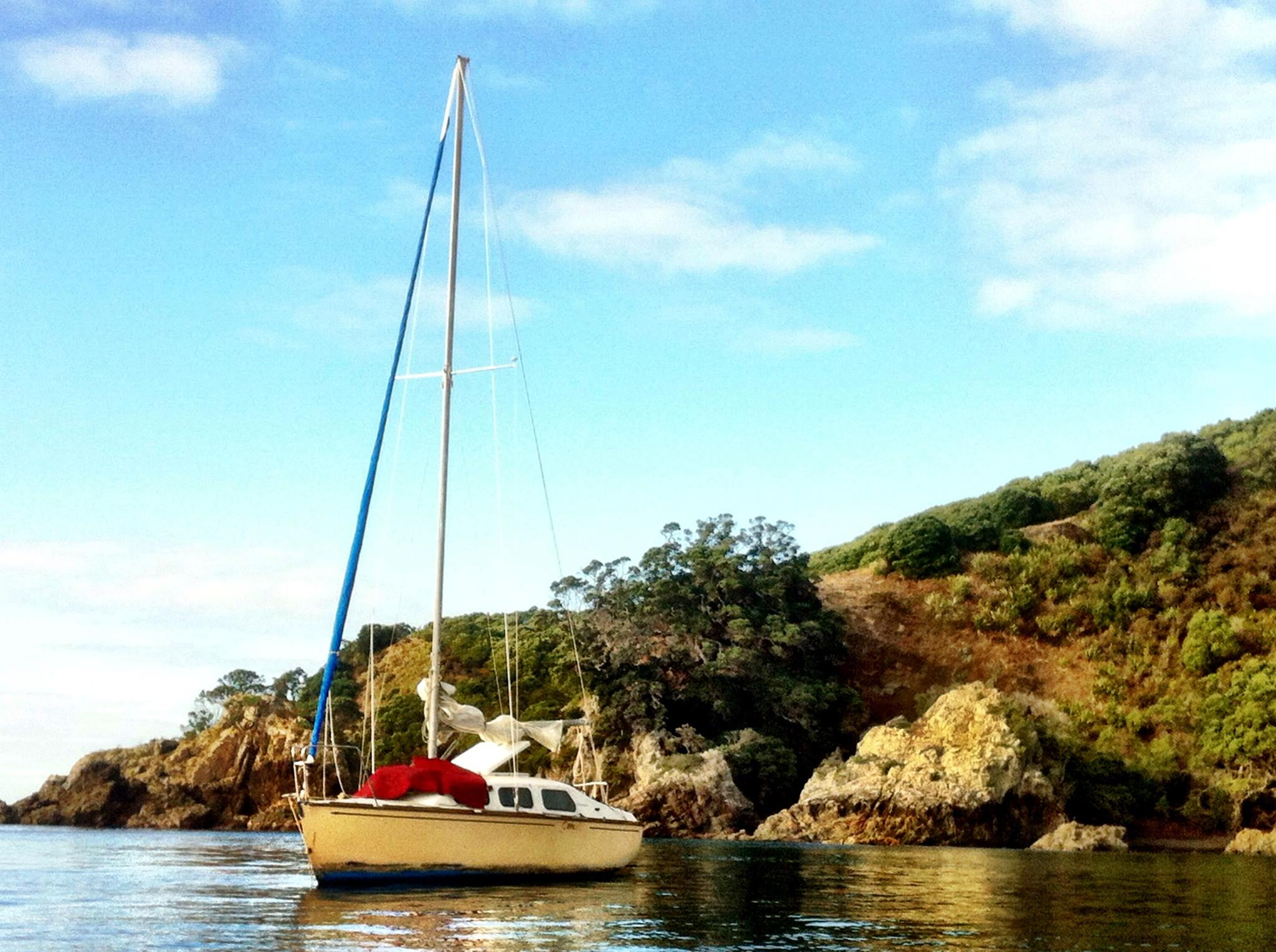
- Beachcomber 6.5 at anchor off Tiritiri Matangi Island, Hauraki Gulf.

Boat
- Draft: 0.6 m (2 ft 0 in) (twin keel); 1.4 m (4 ft 7 in) (fin)

Hull
- Hull weight: 1,000 kg (2,200 lb)
- LOA: 6.5 m (21 ft)
- LWL: 5.8 m (19 ft)
- Beam: 2.45 m (8 ft 0 in)

Rig
- Mast height: 8.53 m (28.0 ft)

Sails
- Mainsail area: 9.6 m^{2} (103 sq ft)
- Jib/genoa area: 8 m^{2} (86 sq ft)

The Beachcomber 6.5 is a semi-round bilge glass-reinforced plastic (GRP) trailerable keelboat designed and built in New Zealand 1970 to 1980 by Hart Brothers Marine.

Construction is a laminate of fibreglass with a 12mm end-grain balsa core.

Atypically for a New Zealand boat, the Beachcomber was designed to have either a twin keel or fin configuration. Cabin layout is in two variations - a traditional style coach-house (standard) and a raised deck (flush deck) versions. The first 3 boats had the cabin and deck made from glass over ply the subsequent boats had balsa/GRP sandwich the same as the hulls . Only three, or possibly four, were completed with fin keels. Racing results would tend to suggest that there was little difference in performance between the two configurations.

There were two bilge keel designs, the earlier design being a pair of essentially square, cast steel plates. The design was changed following an incident off Waiheke Island, which gave the boat an undeserved reputation for tenderness. The later design comprised two cast iron slightly swept fins, with slim bulbs along the lower edge, which gave a ballast weight of 340 kg and considerably stiffened the boat.

Accommodation consists of a main saloon (two quarter berths and two settee berths) and a forward cabin containing a V-berth and (typically) a chemical toilet. A table on the port side dropped to form a single berth, making it possible, although crowded, to accommodate six overnight.

In standard form, factory finished, the galley consisted of a two-burner stove, which hinged from the aft cabin bulkhead, with a sink below, in a pedestal forming a support for the companionway. A small gas bottle could be accommodated in a receptacle in the cockpit.

A good number of boats were home finished, in many cases gaining a more practical galley in the starboard forward area of the cabin, but losing part of the starboard settee berth.

Having no centrecase, the boat, particularly in flush-deck form, was unusually roomy for its size. There was very ample storage under berths.

A total of 89 hulls were built, with a fairly even split between standard and flush decked models. Of these 88 are known to have been launched, the other hull being built in a rather eccentric fashion by a home builder, who intended to fit a centrally mounted engine and amphibious tracks, to allow the vessel to "crawl" ashore. The boat had a centre cockpit and aft cabin. It is not known if this vessel was ever completed or launched.

Given that the boat was designed for cruising comfort, rather than racing, the Beachcomber 6.5 sails very well and, in the 1980s were often well placed in club racing. When properly sailed they were surprisingly close winded for a bilge-keeler, particularly when fitted with the later keel design. In 1980, the late Tony Bouzaid designed a very tall, flat, long-luffed but short-footed self tacking Genoa, known as a "Number 3 Jib", for the boat and this proved a highly successful windward sail.

The Waiheke Incident. In the mid-1970s an early boat was being sailed in the vicinity of Waiheke Island, in relatively challenging conditions, for which it was somewhat over canvassed. It suffered a complete knockdown and, since the sails were not released, could not recover, which caused the loss of life of a crew member from a heart condition. Later investigation confirmed that, had the sails been released in a timely fashion, the boat could have recovered from a 90 degree position, albeit that the ballast was a little light to do so. The Press, at the time gave rather negative attention to the type of vessel involved, resulting in the Beachcomber gaining, for a while, a reputation it did not deserve, being markedly better in stability than many contemporary trailer sailers. The redesigned keels resolved any lingering issues about stability.

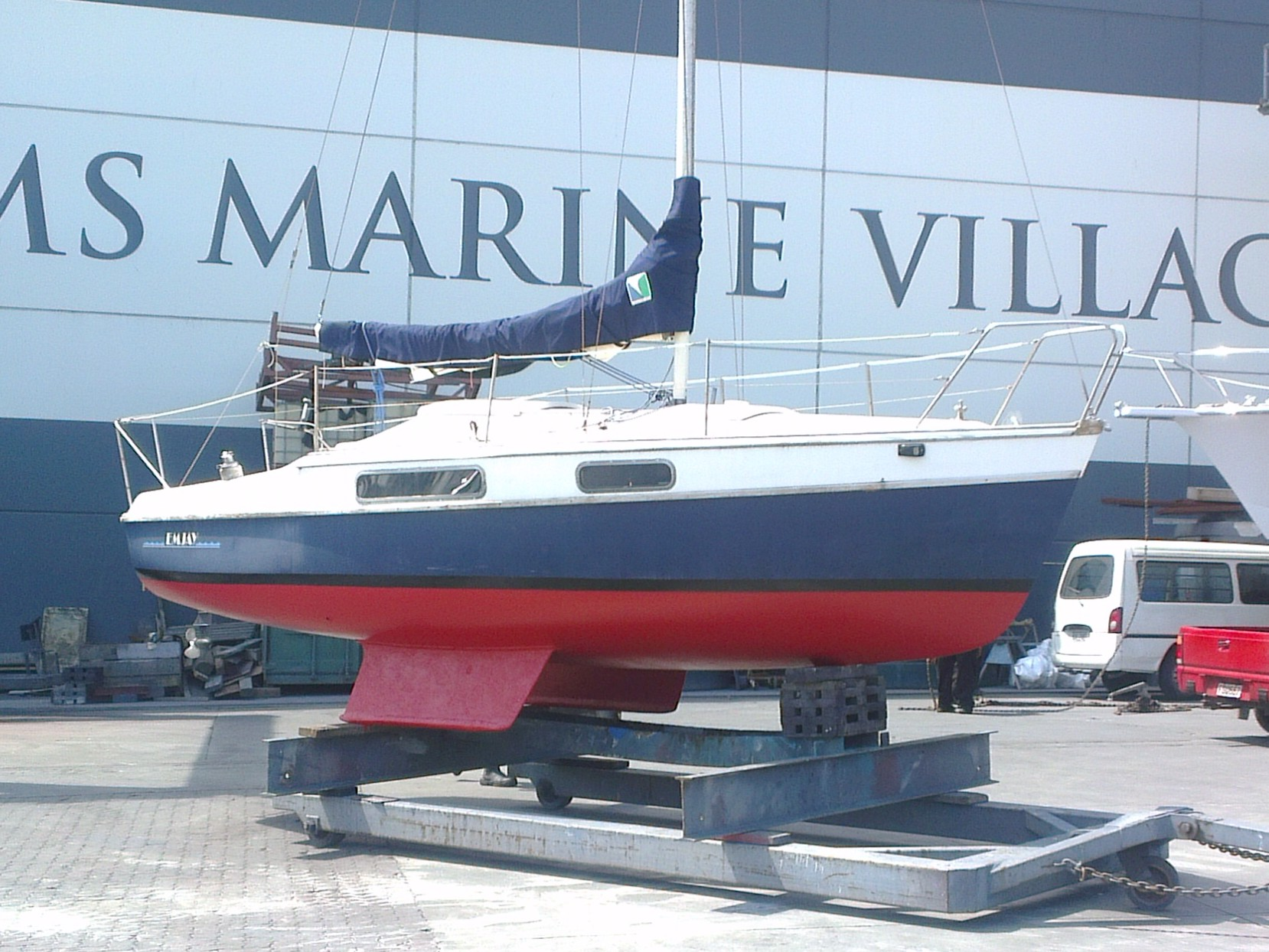
A twin-keeled Beachcomber 6.5 hauled out for antifouling.

== Hart Brothers Marine ==
Hart Brothers Marine was founded in 1970 by Raymond and Dennis Hart, fifth-generation boat builders whose' parents emigrated from Norfolk, bringing the family with them. Raymond Hart was lost in Little Shoal Bay, Auckland after being knocked unconscious and falling overboard when hit by the boom of the boat he was sailing on. Hart Brothers Marine itself was de-registered in 1996.
