= Johnsons Coach & Bus Travel =

British bus operating company

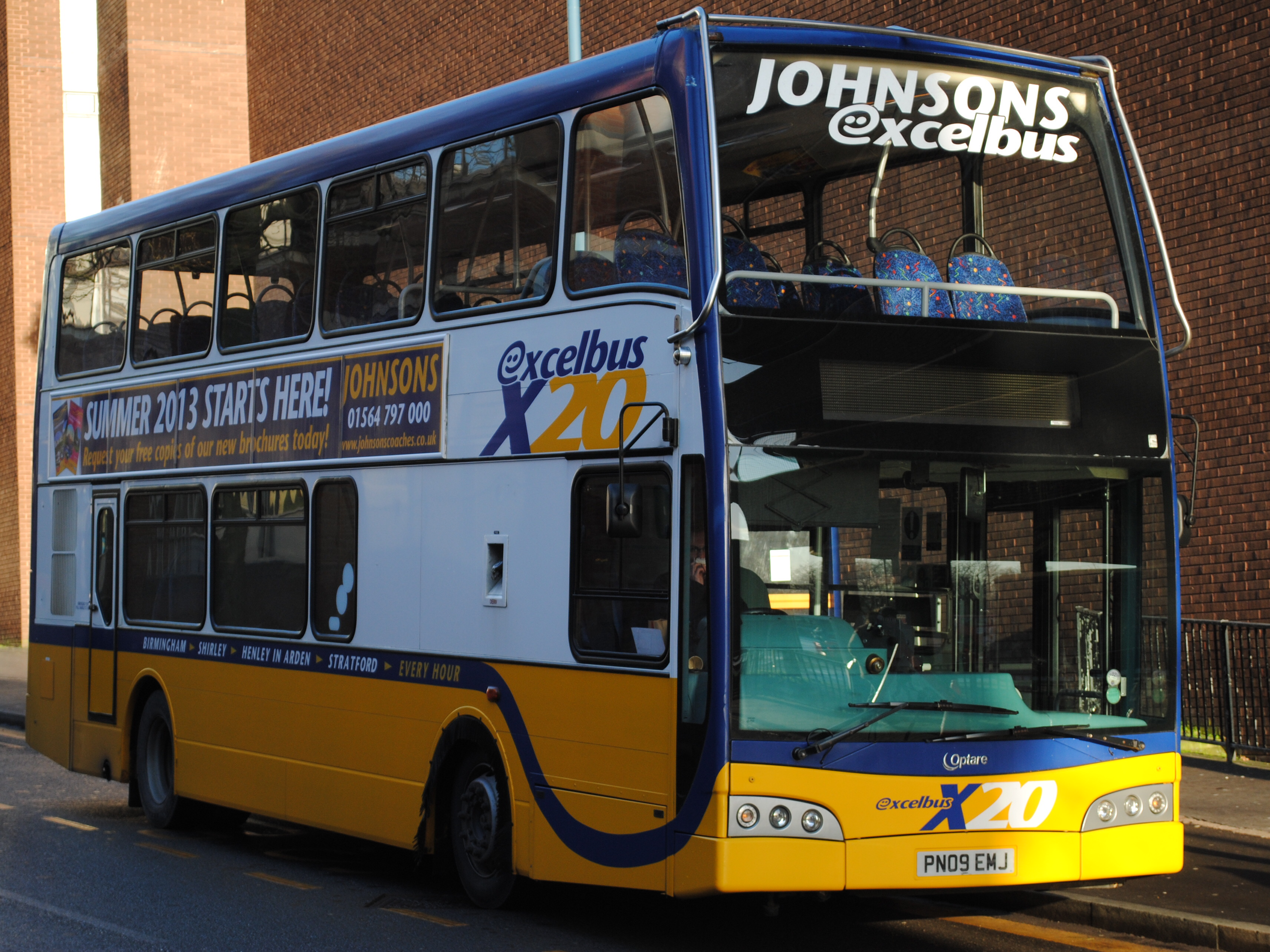
- Optare Olympus bodied Scania N230UD in Birmingham in February 2013
- Founded: 1909
- Headquarters: Henley-in-Arden
- Service area: Gloucestershire; Warwickshire; West Midlands
- Service type: Coach operator
- Depots: 2
- Fleet: 85
- Website: www.johnsonscoaches.co.uk

Johnsons Coach & Bus Travel is a bus and coach operator based in the Warwickshire town of Henley-in-Arden.

== History ==
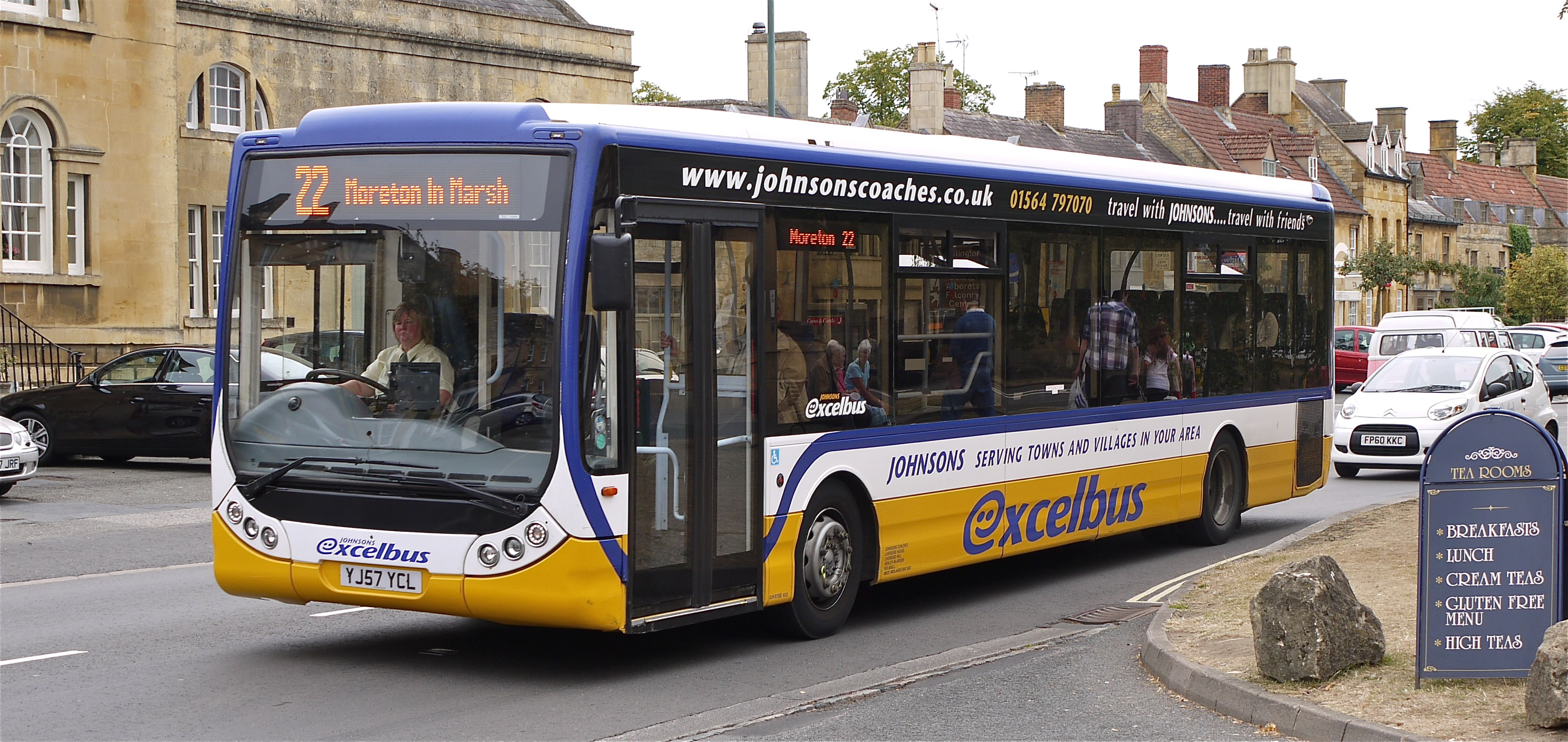
Optare Tempo in Moreton-in-Marsh in 2011

In 1909, Jack and Blanch Johnson purchased a carrier business with one carriage and two horses in Henley-in-Arden. In 1922, the first motorised bus was purchased. In the late 1970s, it began to operate coach tours, expanding with the purchase of the Fletchers Coaches business in 1989 and Arnold Shaw Coaches in 1993.

In 2000, it diversified into bus service operations with services operated under contract to Warwickshire County Council. In January 2015, Whittles of Kidderminster was purchased from East Yorkshire Motor Services with nine coaches.

Johnsons' Excelbus operations were sold to the Rotala Group in April 2022. The company's commercial and tendered bus services, as well as most drivers and their fleet of 18 buses, will become part of Rotala's Diamond West Midlands operation.

== Services ==
Until April 2022, when the sale of the Excelbus part of the bus business to Rotala was announced, Johnsons operated 24 routes in Gloucestershire, Warwickshire, Worcestershire, Oxfordshire and the West Midlands.

All former Johnsons Excelbus services were formally taken over by Rotala subsidiary Diamond Bus West Midlands on 29 May 2022, although due to driver shortages a number of services were taken over earlier on 9 May 2022 . Most of the buses used by Johnsons have also moved across to Diamond Bus. Subsequently retendering has seen several services taken over by Stagecoach including service X20 which now runs from Stratford to Solihull but which Johnsons extended to Coventry along the separate 82 route, now also operated by Stagecoach.

== Fleet ==
Johnsons operated a fleet of around 85 buses and coaches.
