= J. B. Morton =

English humorous writer (1893–1979)

John Cameron Andrieu Bingham Michael Morton (7 June 1893 – 10 May 1979) was an English humorous writer noted for authoring a column called "By the Way" under the pen name 'Beachcomber' in the Daily Express from 1924 to 1975.

G. K. Chesterton described Morton as "a huge thunderous wind of elemental and essential laughter"; according to Evelyn Waugh, he had "the greatest comic fertility of any Englishman".

== Childhood ==
Morton was born at Park Lodge, Mitcham Road, Tooting, south London. He was an only child, and his father, Edward Morton, was a serious journalist and drama critic. He introduced Morton junior to (watered-down) wine before he went to school, and to the sons of his friend Leslie Stuart. His mother, Rosamond Bingham, died when he was 12.

From the age of eight Morton attended Park House prep school in Southborough, London. In 1907 he moved on to Harrow School and hated it. Harrow later provided the inspiration for the fictional Narkover, a school full of theft, gambling, drinking and corruption. Morton was admitted to Worcester College, Oxford, but failed to win a scholarship, and had to leave after a year to support his father after a stroke.

Morton did not have an outstanding academic career, and left Oxford wanting to be a poet. His talent as a poet proved to be limited.

== Career ==
=== Early career ===
Quickly realising that he could not make a living from poetry, Morton found a job writing for a musical revue, until he was interrupted by the outbreak of war in 1914. He enlisted as a private in the Royal Fusiliers and was sent to the trenches the following year. The battalion was disbanded in 1916 and Morton was commissioned in the Suffolk Regiment. After fighting in the Somme he was sent home with shell shock and spent the rest of the war in the intelligence service.

After the war, Morton wrote a novel, The Barber of Putney, based on his experience of life in the trenches. It was published in 1919, and the same year, he started writing for the Sunday Express newspaper. He had a weekly column which he filled with random jokes and poems, and wrote occasional essays on cross-country walking—his favourite hobby. In 1922, he was moved over to the Daily Express as a reporter, but did not enjoy straight reporting. Morton later recalled, "I remember being asked to interview the mother of a boy who'd killed someone. As I went along in the cab, I thought: 'D'you realise what you're doing?' Then I decided I couldn't go on."

=== Beachcomber ===
On 7 July 1917, the "By the Way" column first appeared on the leader page of the Express. Nothing shocking at first, it was 900 words of gossip and topical comment previously appearing under the header "Gossip of the Day". Major John Bernard Arbuthnot MVO started the new column and the 'Beachcomber' pseudonym that appeared a week later. In 1919, he was promoted to assistant editor, and D. B. Wyndham Lewis (the literary editor) took the column over. Like Morton, Wyndham Lewis had also served in the ranks in the War, and the two shared a bizarre sense of humour, as well as being fellow Francophiles. Wyndham Lewis set the surreal, comic style that was to become the column's identifying feature, and published the first collection of Beachcomber material in 1922, entitled A London Farrago.

With so much in common, when Morton moved into his cubicle they quickly became friends, and their continual banter could be heard across the top floor of the building. Thus, when Wyndham Lewis moved to the Daily Mail in April 1924, Morton was the obvious person to continue the column. He gradually lightened the tone of the humour, and introduced a range of recurring characters. Morton published his first Beachcomber collection, Mr Thake, in 1929, and 17 more collections followed over the next 30 years.

Early on, Morton wrote his column in the offices of the Express, and was known for laughing out loud and dancing after finishing each paragraph. As a day's column never took more than a few hours, and he always wrote a week in advance, his afternoons were always free for socialising. In later years, he despatched the (hand-written) column by post from wherever he happened to be at the time.

Morton viewed the Beachcomber sobriquet as a protective blanket of anonymity, and continued to enjoy this until his identity was revealed in the 1930s. Drawings in the column depicted Beachcomber as a young woman, and the column was widely believed to be composed of many people's contributions. Behind this cover, Morton often indulged himself in opinionated rants about new inventions, motorists, Socialists, pretentious art, public schools, and whatever else aroused his wrath.

Under Morton's pen, By the Way continued for many years, surviving the Second World War paper shortages and consequent shrinkage of the Express to four pages. His mockery of both Nazi propaganda and British red tape was recognised as a huge contribution to morale, and Morton became a CBE in 1952. In 1965, the column was enlarged and made weekly.

The final column appeared on 29 November 1975 containing the headline "Lawnmower Used on Vet's Whiskers".

Nineteen episodes of a television adaptation of the columns, The World of Beachcomber, were produced by and shown on BBC2 in 1968–69. The format reflected the column in being a series of unrelated sketches with (largely) scripted inks provided by Spike Milligan. The actors included Sir Michael Redgrave and leading comedians of the time and scripts were by leading comedy writers including Barry Took.

A BBC radio programme Beachcomber by the Way, based on the column, was broadcast for 18 episodes from 1989 to 1994, with Richard Ingrams playing the voice of Beachcomber. John Wells, John Sessions and Patricia Routledge played supporting parts, in particular Wells as the impertinent questioner Prodnose forever asking Beachcomber what he meant by what he said.

=== Other work ===
Morton also wrote a few pieces on French history, in the style of his good friend Hilaire Belloc, but these were not widely read and are now forgotten. After his retirement, he started work on an autobiography, but said it would be a "boring" read and tore up his notes. Another work is SPRINGTIME: Tales of the Café Rieu, describing life on the Parisian Left Bank.

== Friends and adventures ==
Morton fell in with J. C. Squire's circle of acquaintances. Squire was the editor of the London Mercury, and his reputation for helping young writers had caused him to accrue a posse of writers and poets, which Morton was happy to join on excursions to pubs in the area of Fleet Street. Squire's amateur cricket team is described in England, Their England by A. G. Macdonell; the exuberant character Tommy Huggins is based on Morton.

This also introduced him to Hilaire Belloc, whose second son, Peter, became a close friend until his death in 1941. Belloc was 52 when Morton met him, and looked older. Both Belloc senior and Morton enjoyed cross-country walking, and improvising songs as they walked; the three of them sailed Belloc's cutter, the Nona. Like Belloc, Morton was a Roman Catholic, and shared many of the attitudes of the Chesterton–Belloc circle.

Morton applied his love of the surreal not just to his writing but to everyday life. Walking through Guildford one day with Gerald Barry, Morton stopped at a pillar box. He talked into its opening: "Are you alright, my little man? Don't worry, we'll soon get you out." Soon, a concerned crowd gathered to see who was trapped inside. Somebody summoned the fire brigade to help, while Morton and Barry made a discreet exit. Events like this were quite frequent: on another occasion he littered Virginia Woolf's front doorstep with dozens of empty, quart-sized brown ale bottles.

Wyndham-Lewis recalls that on their first meeting, the door 'burst open' and 'a thick-set, bucolic figure, all over straw and clay, strode in and banged passionately on the floor with a thick gnarled stick uttering a roar soon known and feared in every pub on Fleet Street: "Flaming eggs! will no one rid me of this stinking town?"'.

== Married life and old age ==
In 1927 Morton married Mary O'Leary, an Irish doctor. This put an end to his spending time with his drinking friends, and to life in London. To escape the Labour government of the late forties, the couple moved to Dublin for two years, and then to Ferring in Worthing. This moving around didn't interfere with the column, which Morton hand-wrote (never having learned to type) on sheets of blue Basildon Bond and posted to the Express. His new lifestyle did, though: Morton's writing became increasingly cynical, and he became "a gloomy little man," in the words of his illustrator Nicolas Bentley. Richard Ingrams, who edited some Beachcomber collections, and appeared as Beachcomber on BBC Radio 4, described him as "heavy-going and uncommunicative" in his later years.

The couple were happy together until Mary's death in 1974; Morton lost his job the year after. His enforced retirement was not happy, and he lived alone, eating mostly bread and jam (Morton couldn't even boil an egg). He became quite confused and spent time looking for his wife, whom he believed to be still alive. Morton eventually settled in a nursing home, but insisted on addressing all the ladies there as Mary. After his death in 1979, aged 85, his house was demolished and all his papers destroyed.

== Works ==
- The Barber of Putney (1919)
- Gorgeous poetry, 1911–1920 (1920)
- Penny royal (1921)
- Enchanter's Nightshade (1921)
- Old Man's Beard (1923)
- The Cow Jumped Over the Moon: A Story (1923)
- Hark Backward: A Sporting Novel (1929)
- Sobieski, king of Poland (1932)
- Maladetta (1932)
- 1933 and still going wrong (1932)
- Who's who in the zoo (1933)
- Hag's Harvest (1933)
- Tally-ho! and other hunting noises (1934)
- Vagabond (1934)
- The death of the dragon: new fairy tales (1934)
- Skylighters (1934)
- The Barber of Putney (1934, revision of 1919 novel)
- The Bastille falls, and other studies of the French revolution (1936)
- Gallimaufry (1936)
- The Dauphin (1937)
- Pyrenean; being the adventures of Miles Walker on his journey from the Mediterranean to the Atlantic (1938)
- The New Ireland (1938)
- Saint-Just (1939)
- St. Martin of Tours (193?)
- Bridge over the rainbow: a survey of humorous sketches (1940)
- The Gascon, a story of the French Revolution (1946)
- Brumaire, the rise of Bonaparte; a study of French history from the death of Robespierre to the establishment of the Consulate (1948)
- Camille Desmoulins, and other studies of the French Revolution (1950)
- St. Therese of Lisieux, the making of a saint (1954)
- Hilaire Belloc: A Memoir (1955)
- Springtime : tales of the Café Rieu (1956)
- Marshal Ney (1958)

See also under Beachcomber (pen name)

== See also ==
- The Queen's Book of the Red Cross

== Sources ==
- Muir, Frank, ed. (30 April 1990). The Oxford Book of Humorous Prose: From William Caxton to P. G. Wodehouse. Oxford University Press. ISBN 978-0-19-214106-4.
- Morton, J. B. (1988). Frayn, Michael (ed.). The best of Beachcomber. William Heinemann. ISBN 978-0-434-79706-6.
