= Moorsbus =

Network of bus services in North Yorkshire Moors

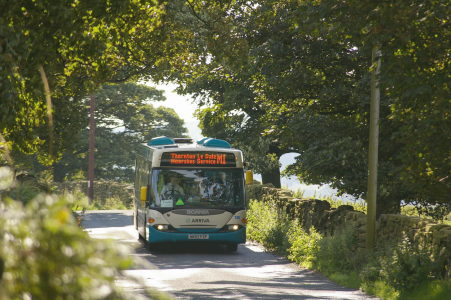
- Arriva North East Scania OmniCity on a Moorsbus service in August 2008
- Parent: Friends of Moorsbus
- Founded: 1980 (North York Moors National Park Authority)
- Headquarters: Pickering
- Locale: North York Moors
- Destinations: Darlington, Stockton on Tees, Middlesbrough, Scarborough, Pickering, Kirkbymoorside,
- Website: www.moorsbus.org

Moorsbus is a network of seasonal bus services operating to and around the North York Moors. It was launched in the 1980s by the North York Moors National Park Authority, and as of 2024, is managed by the Friends of Moorsbus not for profit members association.

Funding for the services comes from fares, donations and contributions made by local councils and authorities.

As of May 2026 the operators that currently hold Moorsbus contracts are: East Yorkshire, York and Country, York Pullman and Arriva North East. Operators who have previously held Moorsbus contracts include Hodgsons Coaches, Northstar, Reliance (since been absorbed into York and Country) and Procters Coaches (now owned by Go Ahead Group).

== History ==
The network ceased operation at the end of October 2013 when North York Moors National Park Authority withdrew funding.

A reduced service ran on summer Sundays and Bank Holidays in 2014 after a campaign by Friends of Moorsbus. East Yorkshire Motor Services ran a service from Hull to Danby via Beverley and Pickering, and the Dales and Bowland Community Interest Company, on behalf of the Moorsbus Community Interest Company, ran the Moors Rambler from Darlington to Pickering via Middlesbrough and Guisborough.

In 2015, East Yorkshire Motor Services ran a summer Sunday/Bank holiday service and Moorsbus Community Interest Company operated two buses, linking Darlington, Teesside, Saltburn, Redcar, Guisborough, Northallerton, Thirsk, Kirkbymoorside, Helmsley and Pickering.

In 2016, Moorsbus Community Interest Company operated three buses on their routes from prior years and a further link via Coxwold, Byland Abbey and Ampleforth to Helmsley. A Ryedale Community Transport bus ran from Malton, Pickering and Kirkbymoorside and provided a shuttle between Helmsley and Rievaulx Abbey and Sutton Bank.

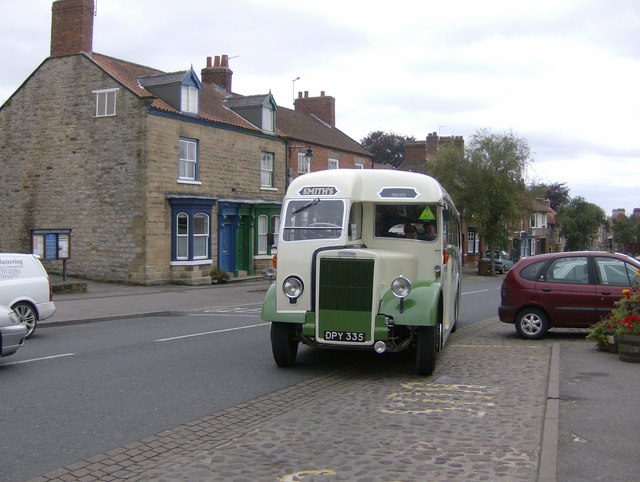
John Smith & Sons 1947 Leyland Tiger PS1 on a Moorsbus service in August 2009.
