= Beachcomber (bus) =

Summertime open-top bus services in England

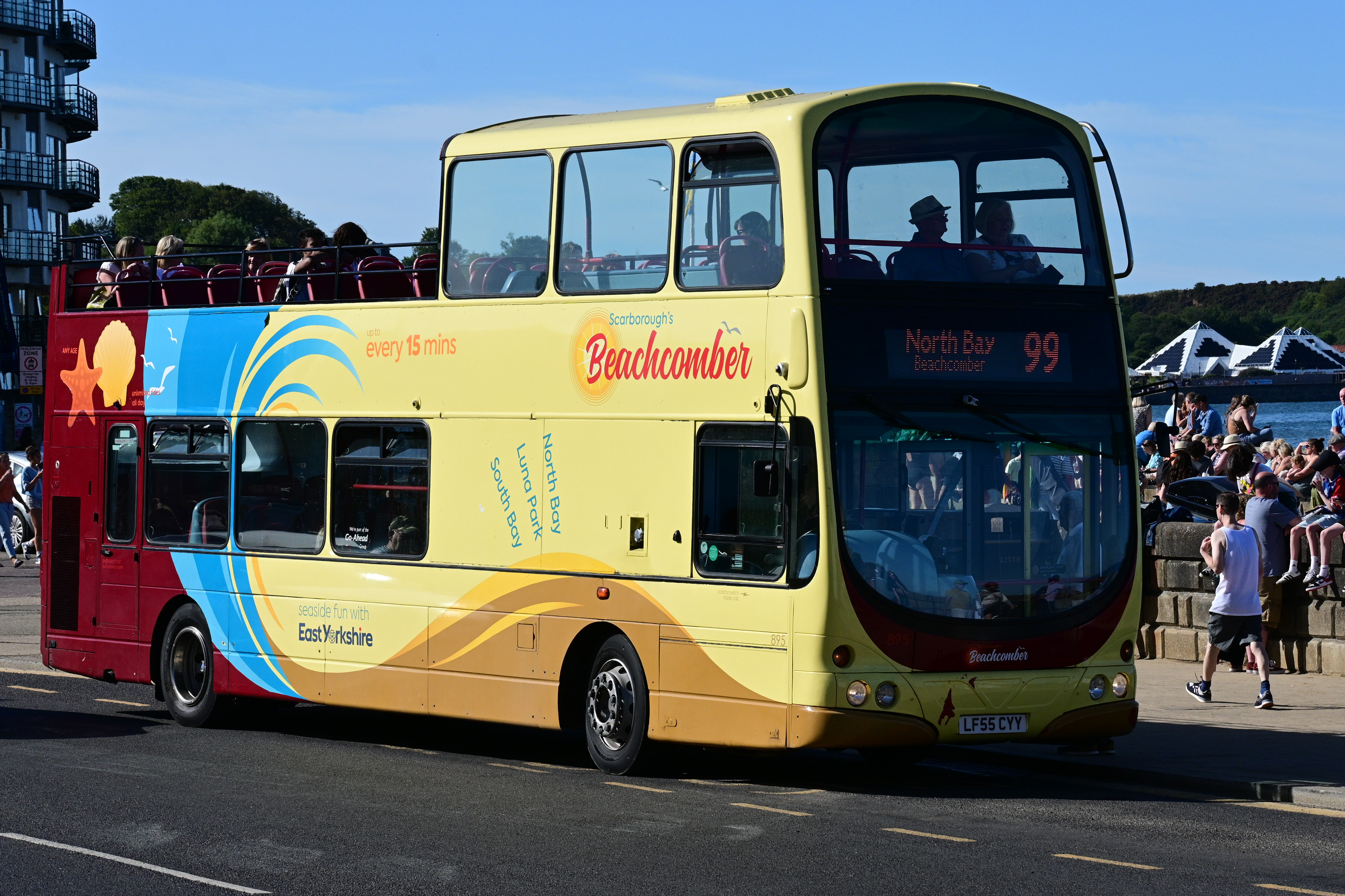
- Scarborough Beachcomber branded Wright Eclipse Gemini bodied Volvo B7TL on the North Bay in 2025

Overview
- Operator: East Yorkshire
- Began service: 2019

Route
- Locale: Bridlington; Scarborough

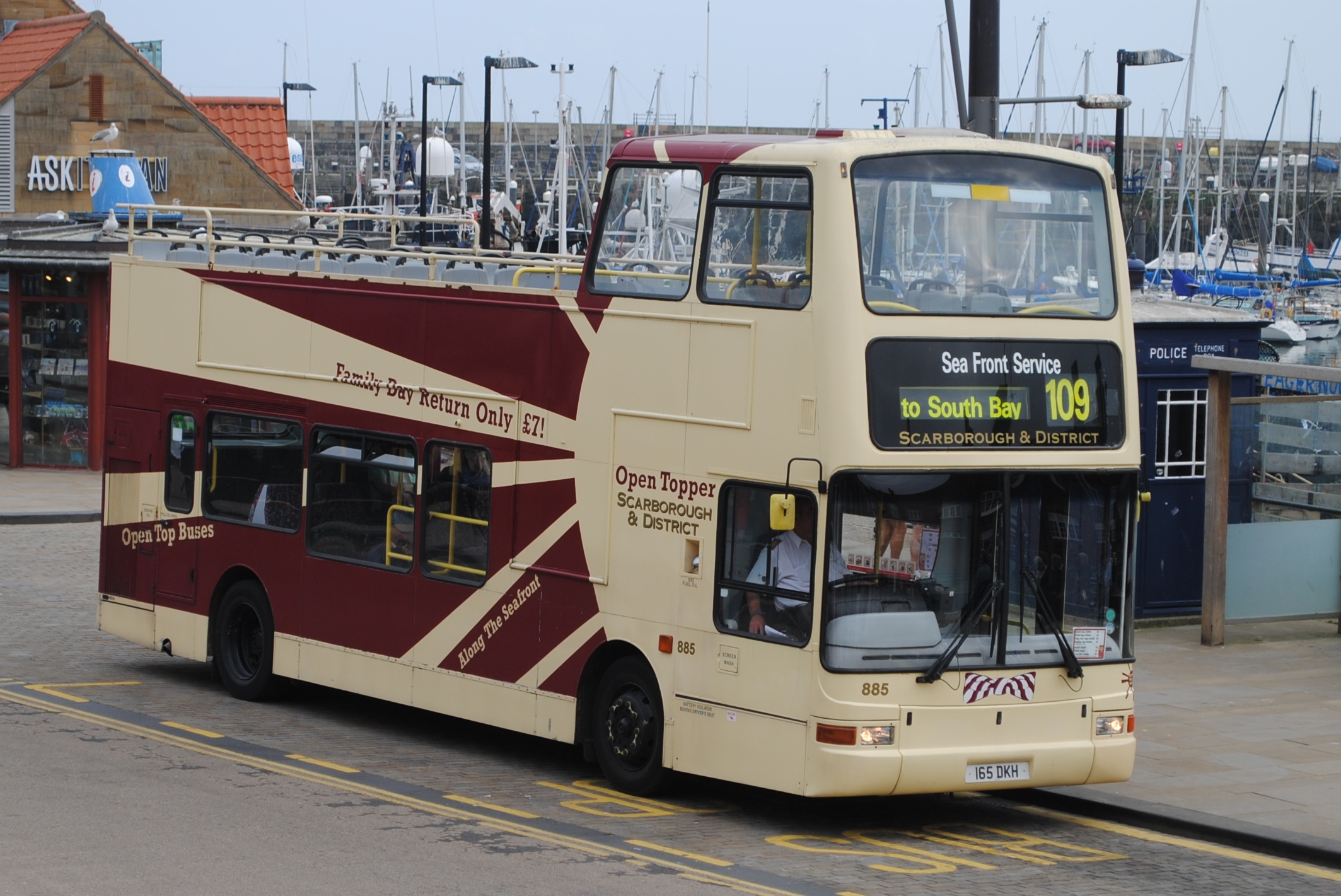
The former service 109, operated by a Scarborough & District open top bus

The Beachcomber is a pair of open top bus services operated in Bridlington and Scarborough during summertime by East Yorkshire.

== History ==
The Beachcomber brand was launched in 2019, coinciding with the purchase of eight second-hand Wright Eclipse Geminis. The Scarborough open top service previously operated as route 109. The Bridlington service previously operated as route 100.

The services were suspended during the national COVID-19 lockdowns, but returned in July 2020. For 2021, service frequencies on both routes were increased, and the Scarborough route was extended.

For the 2023 and 2024 seasons, East Yorkshire confirmed the return of both the Scarborough and Bridlington open-top routes, with similar timetables to previous years and the same branded Wright Eclipse Gemini vehicles.

== Routes ==
The Bridlington service travels along the coast to Flamborough Head. The Scarborough service also follows the coast, travelling from The Spa in the south to the Sea Life centre in the north.
