= Sailboat =

Boat propelled partly or entirely by sails

A typical monohull sloop with Bermuda rig

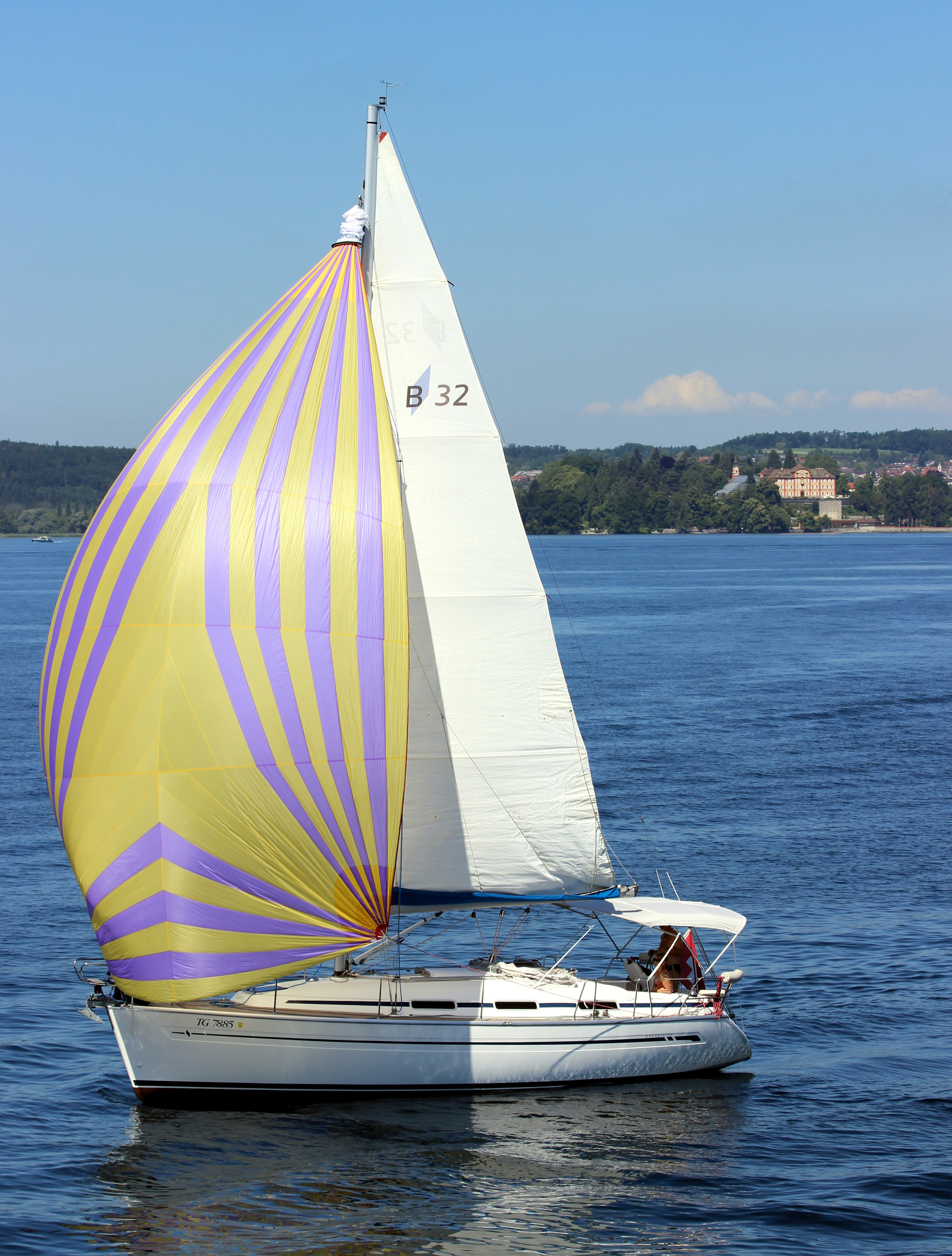
Sailboat on Lake Constance, Germany.

A sailboat or sailing boat is a boat propelled partly or entirely by sails and is smaller than a sailing ship. Distinctions in what constitutes a sailing boat and ship vary by region and maritime culture.

== Types ==
Although sailboat terminology has varied across history, many terms have specific meanings in the context of modern yachting. A great number of sailboat-types may be distinguished by size, hull configuration, keel type, purpose, number and configuration of masts, and sail plan.

Popular monohull designs include:

=== Cutter ===
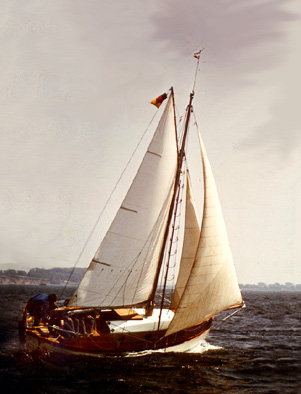
A gaff cutter

The cutter is similar to a sloop with a single mast and mainsail, but generally carries the mast further aft to allow for two foresails, a jib and staysail, to be attached to the head stay and inner forestay, respectively. Once a common racing configuration, today it gives versatility to cruising boats, especially in allowing a small staysail to be flown from the inner stay in high winds.

=== Catboat ===
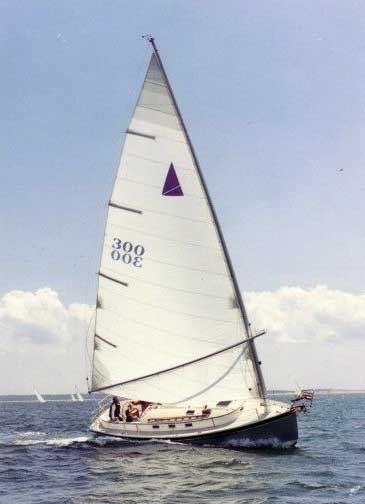
A catboat

A catboat has a single mast mounted far forward and does not carry a jib. Most modern designs have only one sail, the mainsail; however, the traditional catboat could carry multiple sails from the gaff rig. The history of the catboat dates back to the nineteenth century, where it was used by fishermen and sailors due to ease of manufacture and operation. It continues to be utilized in the modern day for recreation.

=== Dinghy ===
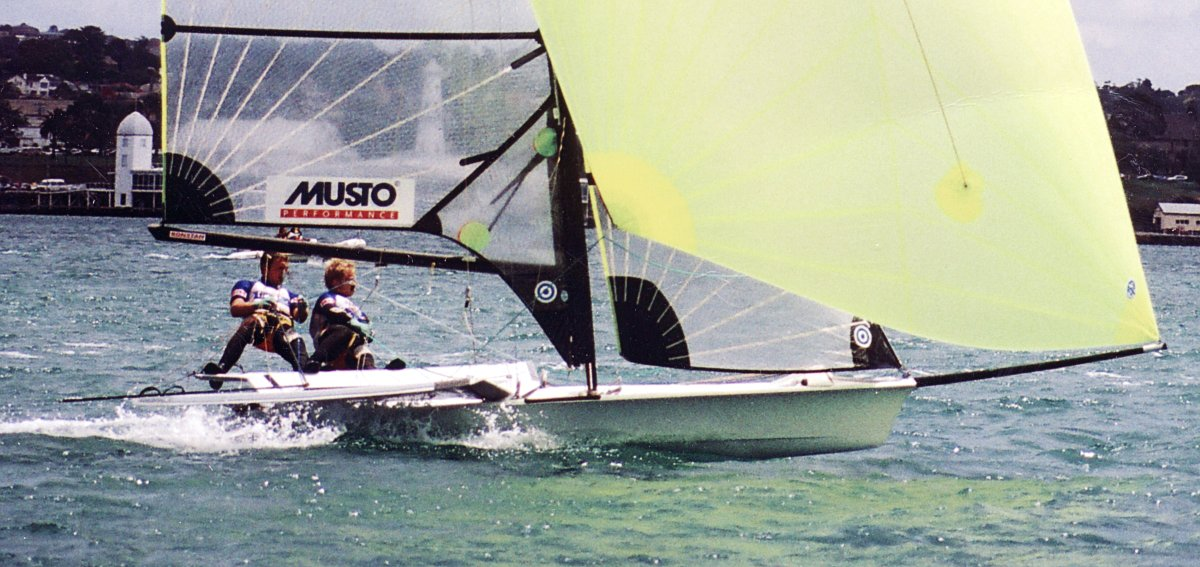
A racing dinghy

A dinghy is a type of small open sailboat commonly used for recreation, sail training, and tending a larger vessel. They are popular in youth sailing programs for their short LOA, simple operation and minimal maintenance. They have three (or fewer) sails: the mainsail, jib, and spinnaker.

=== Ketch ===
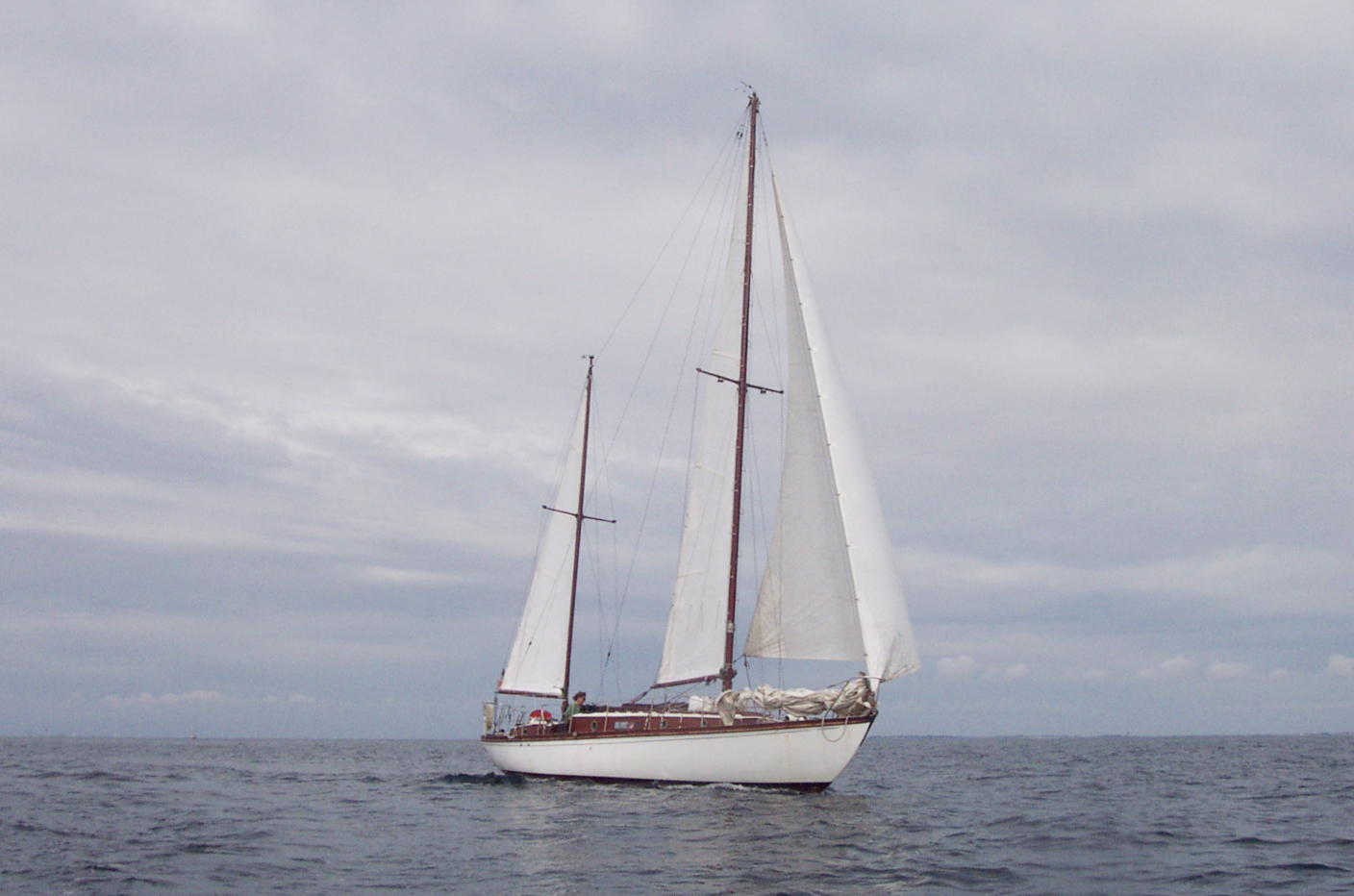
A ketch

Ketches are similar to a sloop, but there is a second shorter mast astern of the mainmast, but forward of the rudder post. The second mast is called the mizzen mast and the sail is called the mizzen sail. A ketch can also be cutter-rigged with two head sails.

=== Schooner ===
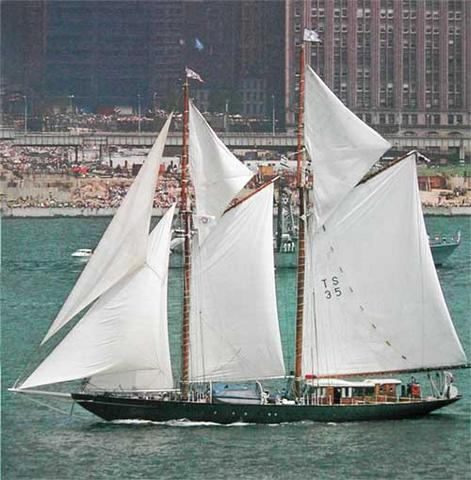
A gaff topsail schooner

A schooner has a mainmast taller than its foremast, distinguishing it from a ketch or a yawl. A schooner can have more than two masts, with the foremast always lower than the foremost main. Traditional topsail schooners have topmasts allowing triangular topsails sails to be flown above their gaff sails; many modern schooners are Bermuda rigged.

=== Sloop ===
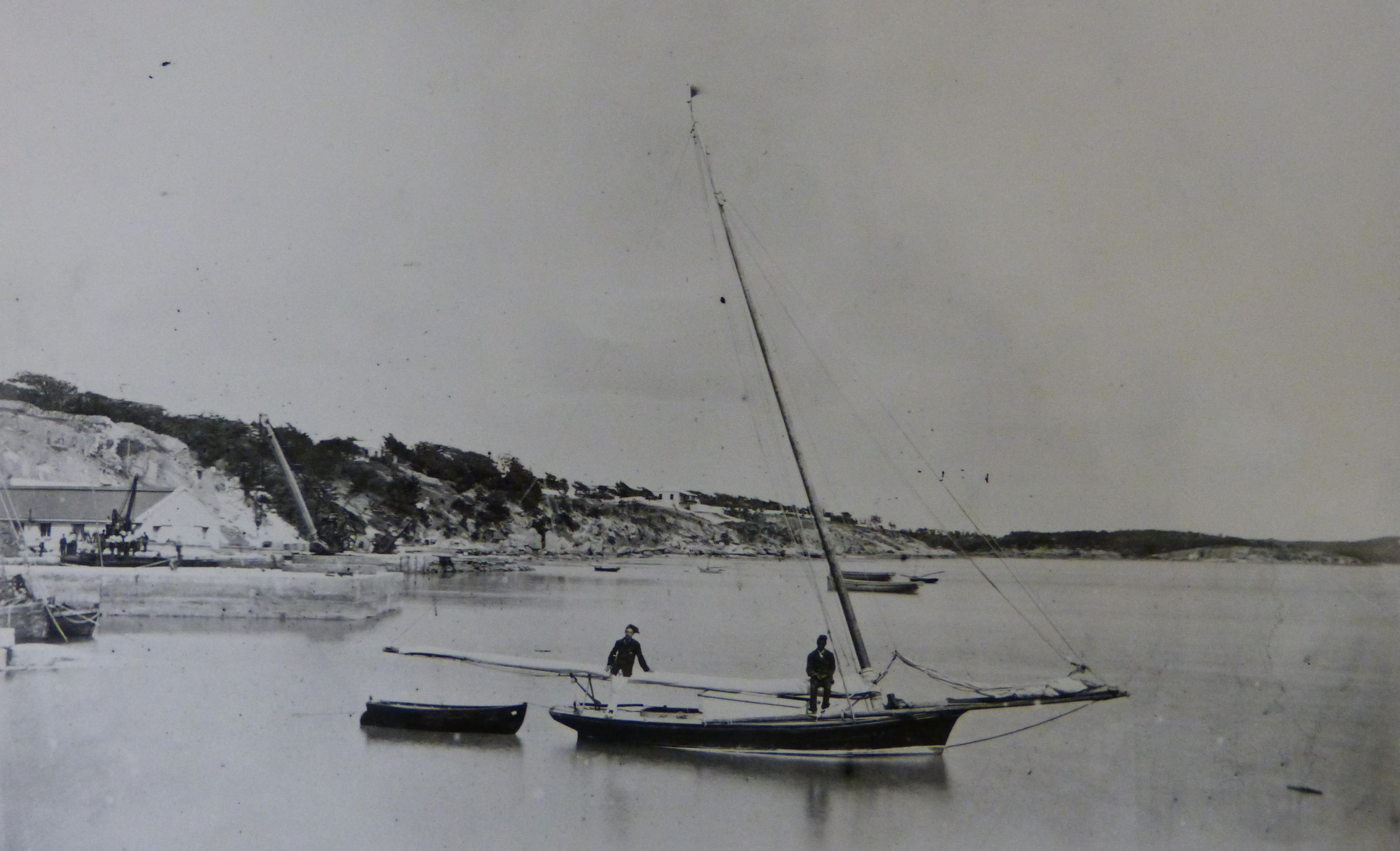
Bermuda rigged sloop at Convict Bay, Bermuda, c. 1879

The most common modern sailboat is the sloop, which features one mast and two sails, typically a Bermuda rigged main, and a headsail. This simple configuration is very efficient for sailing into the wind.

A fractional rigged sloop has its forestay attached at a point below the top of the mast, allowing the mainsail to be flattened to improve performance by raking the upper part of the mast aft by tensioning the backstay. A smaller headsail is easier for a short-handed crew to manage.

=== Yawl ===
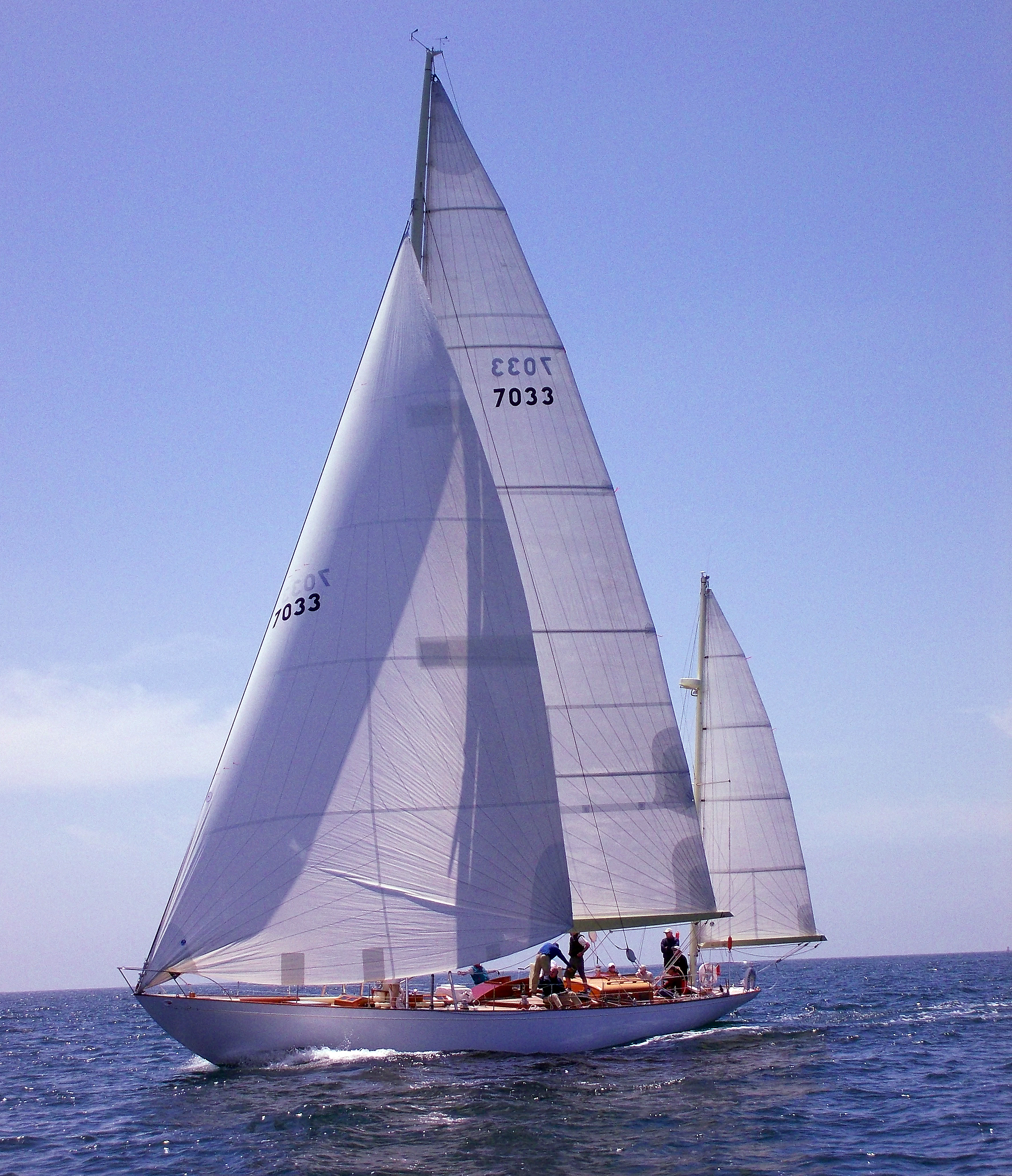
A yawl

A yawl is similar to a ketch, with a shorter mizzen mast carried astern the rudderpost more for balancing the helm than propulsion.

== Component parts ==
=== Hull ===
Traditional sailboats are monohulls, but multi-hull catamarans and trimarans are gaining popularity. Monohull boats generally rely on ballast for stability and usually are displacement hulls. This stabilizing ballast can, in boats designed for racing, be as much as 50% of the weight of the boat, but is generally around 30%. It creates two problems; one, it gives the monohull tremendous inertia, making it less maneuverable and reducing its acceleration. Secondly, unless it has been built with buoyant foam or air tanks, if a monohull fills with water, it will sink.

Multihulls rely on the geometry and the broad stance of their multiple hulls for their stability, eschewing any form of ballast. Some multihulls are designed to be as light-weight as possible while still maintaining structural integrity. They can be built with foam-filled flotation chambers and some modern trimarans are rated as unsinkable, meaning that, should every crew compartment be completely filled with water, the hull itself has sufficient buoyancy to remain afloat.

A multihull optimized for light weight (at the expense of cruising amenities and storage for food and other supplies), combined with the absence of ballast can result in performance gains in terms of acceleration, top speed, and manoeuvrability.

The lack of ballast makes it much easier to get a lightweight multihull on plane, reducing its wetted surface area and thus its drag. Reduced overall weight means a reduced draft, with a much reduced underwater profile. This, in turn, results directly in reduced wetted surface area and drag. Without a ballast keel, multihulls can go in shallow waters where monohulls can not.

There are trade-offs, however, in multihull design. A well designed ballasted boat can recover from a capsize, even from turning over completely. Righting a multihull that has gotten upside down is difficult in any case and impossible without help unless the boat is small or carries special equipment for the purpose. Multihulls often prove more difficult to tack, since the reduced weight leads directly to reduced momentum, causing multihulls to more quickly lose speed when headed into the wind. Also, structural integrity is much easier to achieve in a one piece monohull than in a two or three piece multihull whose connecting structure must be substantial and well connected to the hulls.

All these hull types may also be manufactured as, or outfitted with, hydrofoils.

=== Keel ===
All vessels have a keel, it is the backbone of the hull. In traditional construction, it is the structure upon which all else depends. Modern monocoque designs include a virtual keel. Even multihulls have keels. On a sailboat, the word "keel" is also used to refer to the area that is added to the hull to improve its lateral plane. The lateral plane is what prevents leeway and allows sailing towards the wind. This can be an external piece or a part of the hull.

Most monohulls larger than a dinghy require built-in ballast. Depending on the design of the boat, ballast may be 20 to 50 percent of the displacement. The ballast is often integrated into their keels as large masses of lead or cast iron. This secures the ballast and gets it as low as possible to improve its effectiveness. External keels are cast in the shape of the keel. A monohull's keel is made effective by a combination of weight, depth, and length.

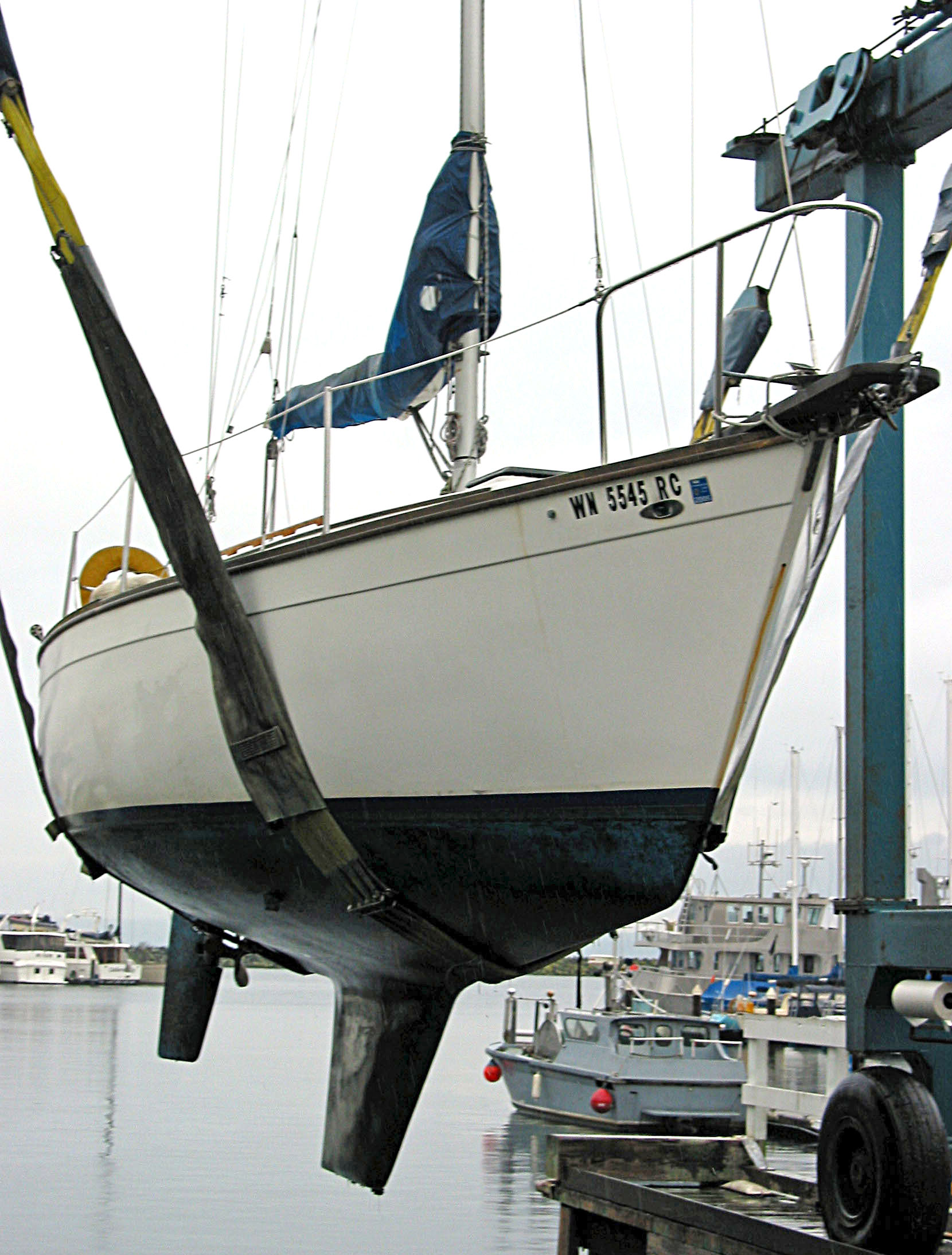
Sailing yacht with a fin keel

Most modern monohull boats have fin keels, which are heavy and deep, but short in relation to the hull length. More traditional yachts carried a full keel which is generally half or more of the length of the boat. A recent feature is a winged keel, which is short and shallow, but carries a lot of weight in two "wings" which run sideways from the main part of the keel. Even more recent is the concept of canting keels, designed to move the weight at the bottom of a sailboat to the upwind side, allowing the boat to carry more sails. A twin keel has the benefit of a shallower draft and can allow the boat to stand on dry land.

Multihulls, on the other hand, have minimal need for such ballast, as they depend on the geometry of their design, the wide base of their multiple hulls, for their stability. Designers of performance multihulls, such as the Open 60's, go to great lengths to reduce overall boat weight as much as possible. This leads some to comment that designing a multihull is similar to designing an aircraft.

A centreboard or daggerboard is retractable lightweight keel which can be pulled up in shallow water.

=== Mast ===
On small sailboats, masts may be "stepped" (put in place) with the bottom end in a receptacle that is supported above the keel of the boat or on the deck or other superstructure that allows the mast to be raised at a hinge point until it is erect. Some masts are supported solely at the keel and laterally at the deck and are called "unstayed". Most masts rely in part or entirely (for those stepped on the deck) on standing rigging, supporting them side-to-side and fore-and aft to hold them up. Masts over 25 feet (7.6 m) may require a crane and are typically stepped on the keel through any cabin or other superstructure.

== Auxiliary propulsion ==
Many sailboats have an alternate means of propulsion, in case the wind dies or where close maneuvering under sail is impractical. The smallest boats may use a paddle; bigger ones may have oars; still others may employ an outboard motor, mounted on the transom; still others may have an inboard engine.

== Commercial operations ==
A sailboat ferry service was established serving San Francisco Bay in 1826. In 2025 a small-scale commercial sailboat service began operating during the summer months between Dover Marina in the UK and Boulogne-Sur-Mer in France.

== See also ==
- Boat
- Boat building
- Boating
- Cruising (maritime)
- Land sailing
- Sail
- Saildrone
- Sailing
- Sailing (sport)
- Sailing ship
- Sailboat design and manufacturing
- Yacht racing
