= East Yorkshire (bus company) =

Bus operator in East and North Yorkshire, England

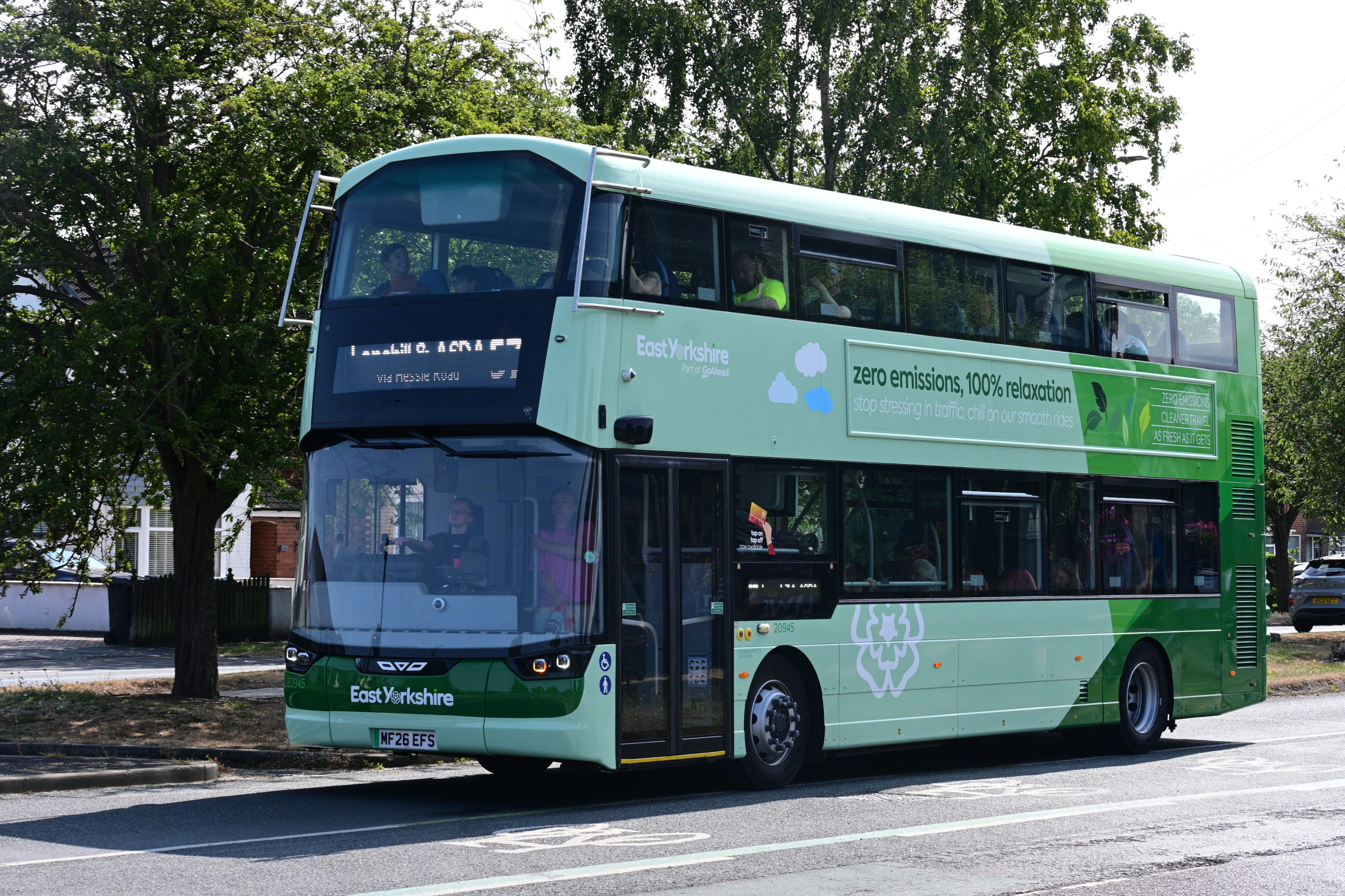
- Wright StreetDeck Electroliner battery electric bus in Kingston upon Hull in July 2026
- Parent: Go-Ahead Group
- Founded: October 1926; 100 years ago
- Headquarters: Kingston upon Hull, East Riding of Yorkshire
- Service area: East Riding of Yorkshire; North Yorkshire
- Service type: Bus and coach
- Depots: 7
- Fleet: 271 (July 2021)
- Managing Director: Matt Ashton (interim)
- Website: www.eastyorkshirebuses.co.uk

East Yorkshire is a bus operator running both local and regional bus services in the East Riding of Yorkshire and North Yorkshire, England. The company was acquired by the Go-Ahead Group in June 2018.

== History ==
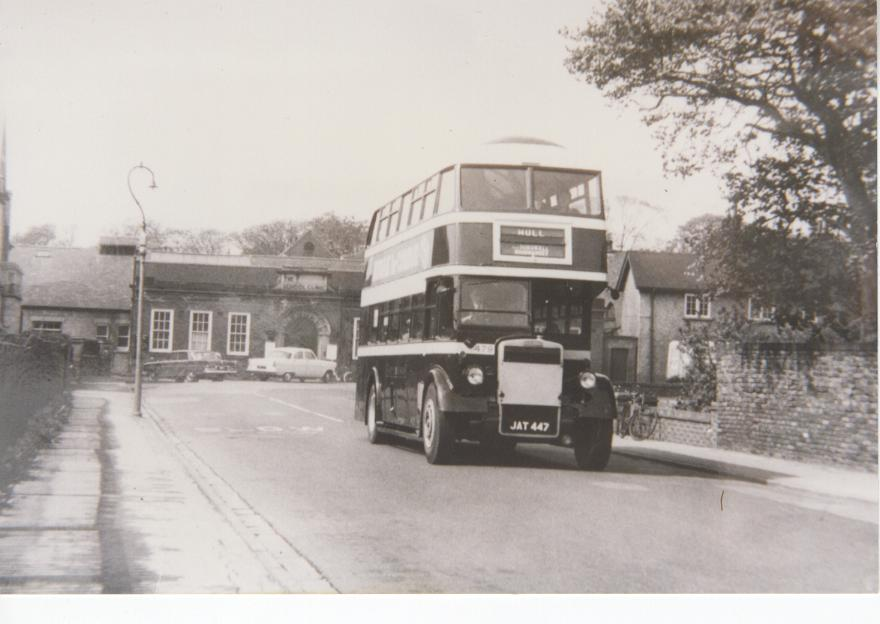
East Yorkshire Motor Services Leyland Titan in Beverley in the 1960s

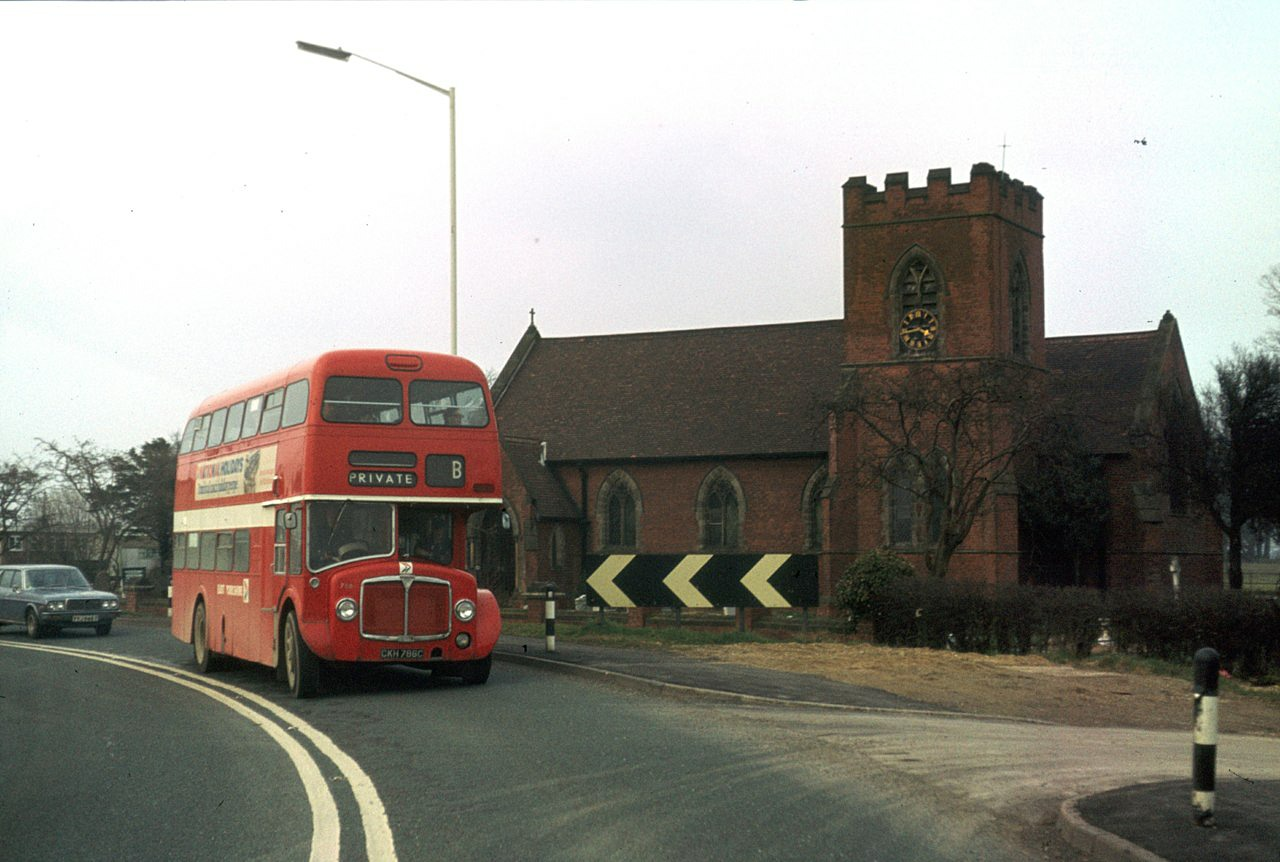
NBC East Yorkshire AEC Renown in Woodmansey in 1979

East Yorkshire originated in two companies, Lee & Beaulah (set up by Ernest John Lee) and Hull & District Motor Services (set up by H. A. Harvey). In October 1926, British Electric Traction purchased the two companies and incorporated a new company, East Yorkshire Motor Services Ltd, which remains the legal name of the company.

In 1968, the British Electric Traction group was sold to the Transport Holding Company, which in turn became the National Bus Company in the following year.

Until 1972, the company's livery was dark blue with a primrose band, with a white relief band also applied to the roofline of buses. Shortly after East Yorkshire was brought under National Bus Company ownership, the primrose band was changed to white and buses were given NBC corporate fleet names. This proved to be short-lived, with the adapted livery being replaced by the standard "poppy" red in October 1973.

=== Deregulation ===
In 1987, following the deregulation of bus services, East Yorkshire's fleet, which had since dropped to 200 vehicles and shared management with Lincolnshire Road Car, started to grow again. The company was sold in a management buyout, which was led by seven managers. In the same year, the company acquired former United Automobile Services depots in Pickering and Scarborough, with operations rebranded Scarborough & District.

Following the management buyout, East Yorkshire began to expand, acquiring many independent operators in the local area, including Connor & Graham, Cottingham Mini Coaches and Primrose Valley Coaches. The Hardwick's of Scarborough fleet was purchased from Wallace Arnold – this being Wallace Arnold's last bus company.

At the time of privatisation, the livery was silver and blue, with some vehicles branded in the National Bus Company's "poppy" red livery or silver, blue and red minibus livery. The "poppy" red buses were subsequently rebranded into a red and grey livery. In Kingston upon Hull, a number of AEC Routemaster double-deck vehicles entered service in traditional East Yorkshire livery to compete with Kingston upon Hull City Transport. The company also suffered competition from Appleby's of Conisholme in Bridlington, Hull and Scarborough, prior to the competitor's sale to the Bowen Transport Group in December 2000.

In 1992, the company completed their first out-of-area acquisition with Finglands Coachways, with further purchases that year including Hull-based Metro Citybus, as well as Rhodes Coaches and Thornton Dale Coaches.

By the turn of the decade, the company had made a significant number of acquisitions: Connor & Graham of Easington (1993), Hart Coaches of Stockton-on-Tees (1995), former GM Buses coaching arm Charterplan (1996), Hollings Coaches of North Shields (1996), former Busways Travel Services coach operator Armstrong Galley (1997), and former KHCT coaching subsidiary Kingstonian Travel Services (1997).

In January 2004, the company proceeded with a second out-of-area acquisition, with the purchase of Whittle Coach & Bus of Kidderminster. In December 2014, the coach operation was sold to Johnsons Coach & Bus Travel.

In March 2009, the company purchased the Hull-based operations of Veolia Transport. The sale saw all driving and engineering staff transferred to East Yorkshire Motor Services, along with services and nine vehicles.

In May 2014, the company's Driffield depot was closed, with most staff, services and vehicles reallocated to nearby depots. In the same month, the company commenced commercial operation of the Moors Explorer ME1 service, which replaced the former Moorsbus M13 and M14 services. The service operates on Sunday and bank holidays between May and August, running between Hessle, Hull, Beverley and Danby via Malton and Pickering – closely following the route of the former services.

In May 2015, East Yorkshire Motor Services was the first operator in the United Kingdom to take delivery of the MCV EvoSeti. Following further deliveries in January 2017 and September 2017, an additional eighteen vehicles were added to the fleet.

In May 2018, the company's Hornsea depot was closed, with the depot's 27 drivers and engineers offered roles elsewhere in the company. The following year, it was announced that the company's Beverley depot was to be closed, with operations relocated to Hull.

=== EYMS Group acquisitions ===
==== Finglands Coachways ====
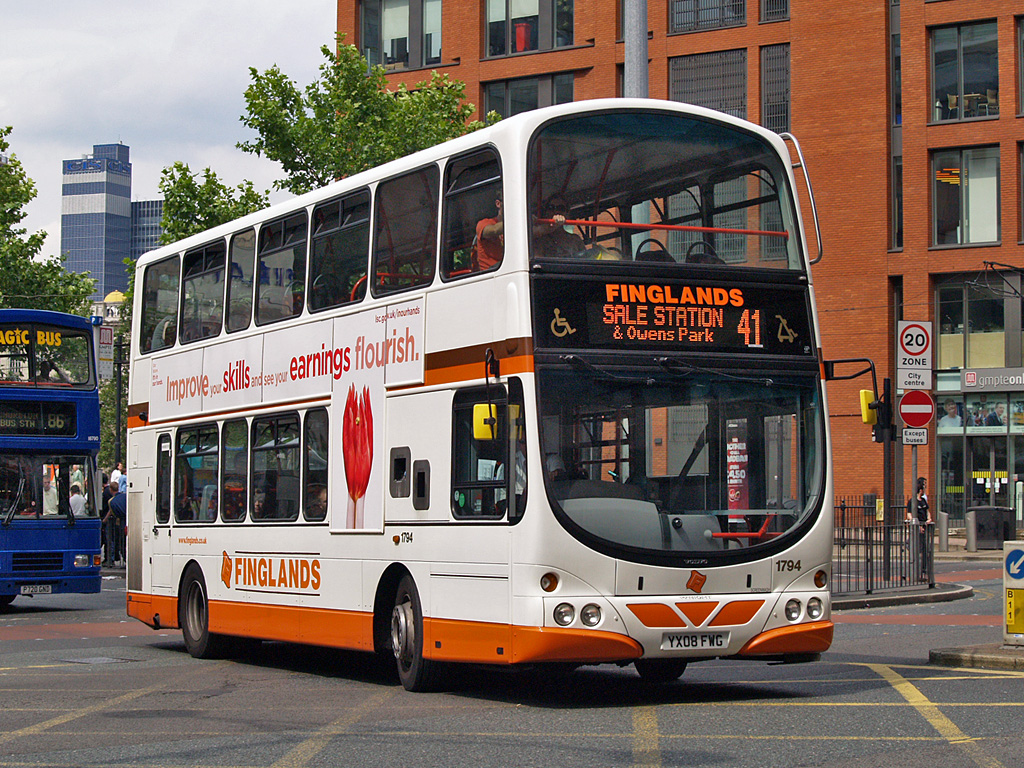
Finglands Coachways Wright Eclipse Gemini bodied Volvo B9TL at Manchester Piccadilly Gardens bus station

The company's first out-of-area expansion was in early 1992, following the purchase of Finglands Coachways of Rusholme. In October 1995, the original Stagecoach Manchester operation, then a subsidiary of Stagecoach Ribble operating 13 buses primarily on route 192, was also purchased.

In August 2013, FirstGroup announced that subject to regulatory approval by the Office of Fair Trading, it had agreed to purchase the bus operations of Finglands Coachways. The sale included the lease of the company's depot in Rusholme, as well as routes, and approximately 100 members of staff – but no vehicles. The deal was approved in January 2014, with First Greater Manchester taking over on operations in February 2014.

In October 2013, East Yorkshire Motor Services sold the Finglands Coachways coach charter business to Bullocks Coaches.

==== Whittle Bus & Coach ====
Whittle Bus & Coach of Kidderminster was acquired by East Yorkshire Motor Services in January 2004. This was the second major out-of-area acquisition for the company, following the management buyout in February 1987. The business operated a total of 50 vehicles at the time of purchase, running bus services in rural Shropshire and Worcestershire.

In December 2014, the coach operation was sold to Johnsons Coach & Bus Travel, along with nine coaches. Following the sale, the company's National Express contracted services were transferred to other operators, with local bus services withdrawn in January 2015.

=== Go-Ahead Group ownership ===
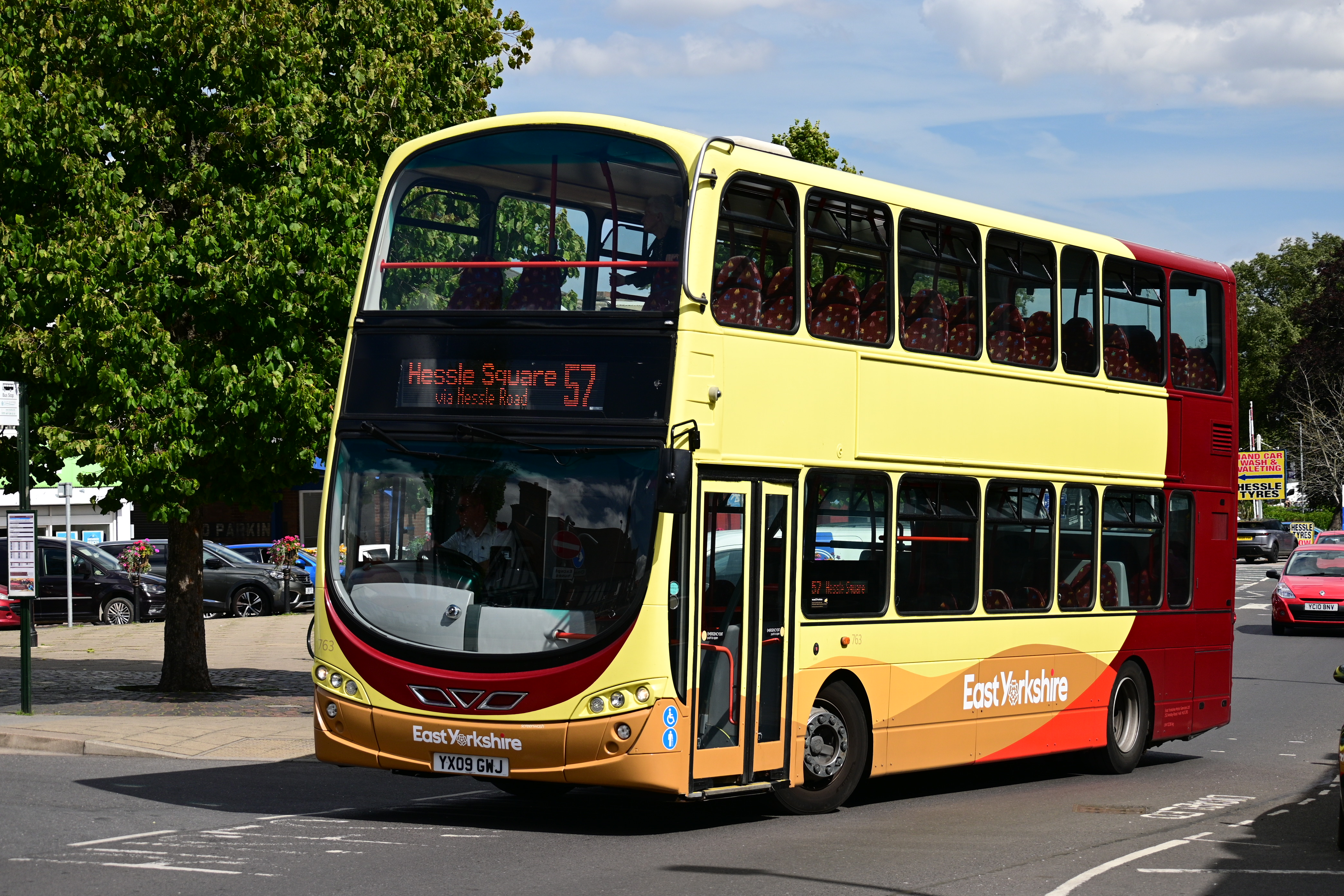
Wright Eclipse Gemini 2 in the company's 2019 livery in Hessle in August 2023

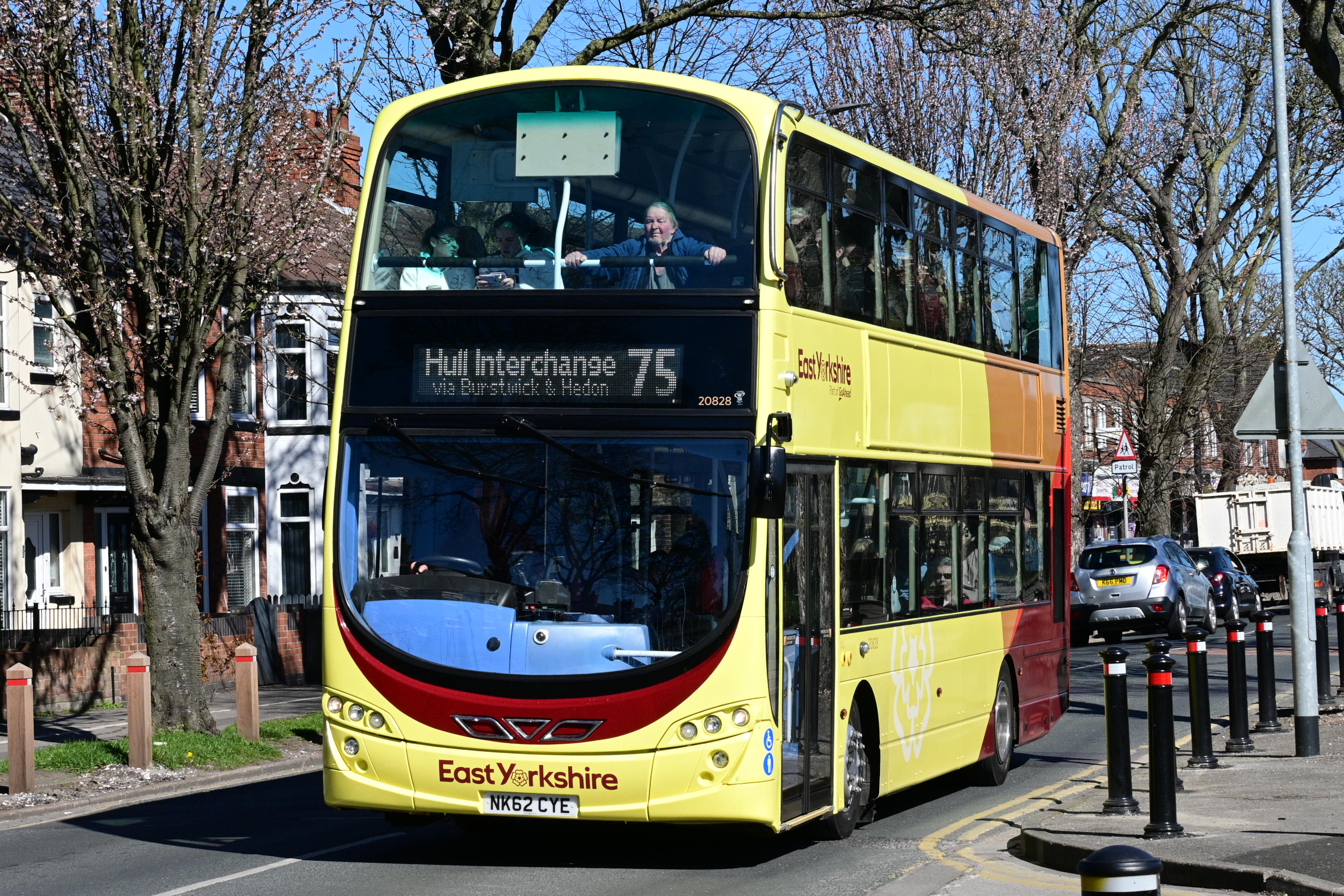
Wright Eclipse Gemini 2 bodied Volvo B5LH in Southcoates, Kingston upon Hull in April 2025

In June 2018, East Yorkshire Motor Services was acquired by the Go-Ahead Group, bringing an end to 30 years of family ownership. Following the acquisition, the company was organised to run as a standalone company within Go North East. In October 2018, the company invested a total of £1 million in new Ticketer smart ticket machines, which have the ability to accept contactless and mobile payments.

In March 2019, a new livery and corporate branding was announced. Under the changes, the trading name for the company was changed to East Yorkshire, with a new typeface and logo design, with the white rose of Yorkshire replacing the letter O and forming part of the logo. The new corporate branding was launched at an event at KCOM Stadium, with two vehicles displayed in the new livery.

In June 2022, it was announced that East Yorkshire was to be split from Go North East, becoming a separate company of the Go-Ahead Group. Following the departure of Martijn Gilbert at Go North East in August 2022, Ben Gilligan, who previously served as East Yorkshire's Area Director since the company's takeover, was promoted to the company's Managing Director. Gilligan departed East Yorkshire in January 2026 to become the managing director of Go North East amid a group reorganisation, with Go North West operations director Matt Ashton filling the role on an interim basis; former Stagecoach Yorkshire, Southern Vectis and Bluestar MD Matt Kitchin is to fill the role from summer 2026.

East Yorkshire was handed responsibility for four North and West Yorkshire-based coach companies acquired by the Go-Ahead Group in May 2024, taking on 200 staff members and 140 vehicles from these companies, whose operations are to be retained as separate subsidiaries of East Yorkshire. These companies were Compass Royston of Middlesbrough, Esk Valley Coaches of Whitby, Fourway Coaches of Leeds and Procters Coaches of Leeming Bar. A fifth company, Morse Coaches of Sheriff Hutton, was acquired and placed under East Yorkshire's management in December 2025.

== Operations ==
=== EastRider sub-brand ===
EastRider-branded Alexander Dennis Enviro400 MMC in Beverley on service X46

In August 2020, the EastRider premium sub-brand was launched. EastRider vehicles carry a distinctive livery and are equipped with E Leather seats and USB sockets. The first services to be upgraded were services 45 and X46/X47, which link Bridlington and Hull with York. A total of eight Alexander Dennis Enviro400 MMC double-deck vehicles were ordered for this upgrade.

In January 2021, services 75 and X7, which operate between Hull and Withernsea were encompassed under the sub-brand, using refurbished MCV EvoSeti double-deck vehicles. At the same time, services 55 and X5, which operate between Goole and Hull were brought under the sub-brand, using a fleet of former National Express Volvo B9R/Caetano Levante coaches and Volvo B9TL/Wright Gemini 2 double-deck vehicles cascaded from Go North East.

In September 2022 services between Hull/Cottingham/Beverley and Hornsea were revamped and brought under the EastRider sub-brand using refurbished Plaxton Centro vehicles and MCV EvoSeti double-deck vehicles. Service 23 operates between Hull and Beverley, Service 24 operates between Hull and Hornsea Via Skirlaugh (avoiding Beverley) Service 25 operates between Hornsea and Hessle, via Beverley, Cottingham and Anlaby At the same time service 121 between Hull and Bridlington was brought under the EastRider brand.

In March 2023 service X5 was discontinued due to low passenger numbers.

In April 2023 alterations were made to service X46 and X47. Service X47 was changed to operate Monday – Saturday daytime up to every hour. The route between Beverley and Hull was changed to run via Beverley Road (same as X46), rather than Cottingham. The combined service means that the Hull-Beverley-York corridor is served by up to 2 buses per hour in each direction.

=== East Yorkshire Coaches ===
The company operates a fleet of coaches for hire, day trips and short holidays under the East Yorkshire Coaches brand. They also operate regional and national coach services under contract to National Express. Between November 2001 and October 2007, East Yorkshire Coaches also traded as Frodingham Coaches, following acquisition of the company. The previous coaching operation, East Yorkshire Travel, was once a nationwide operator, prior to its sale to the Godfrey Burley Group in 1996.

=== Go-Ahead West Yorkshire ===
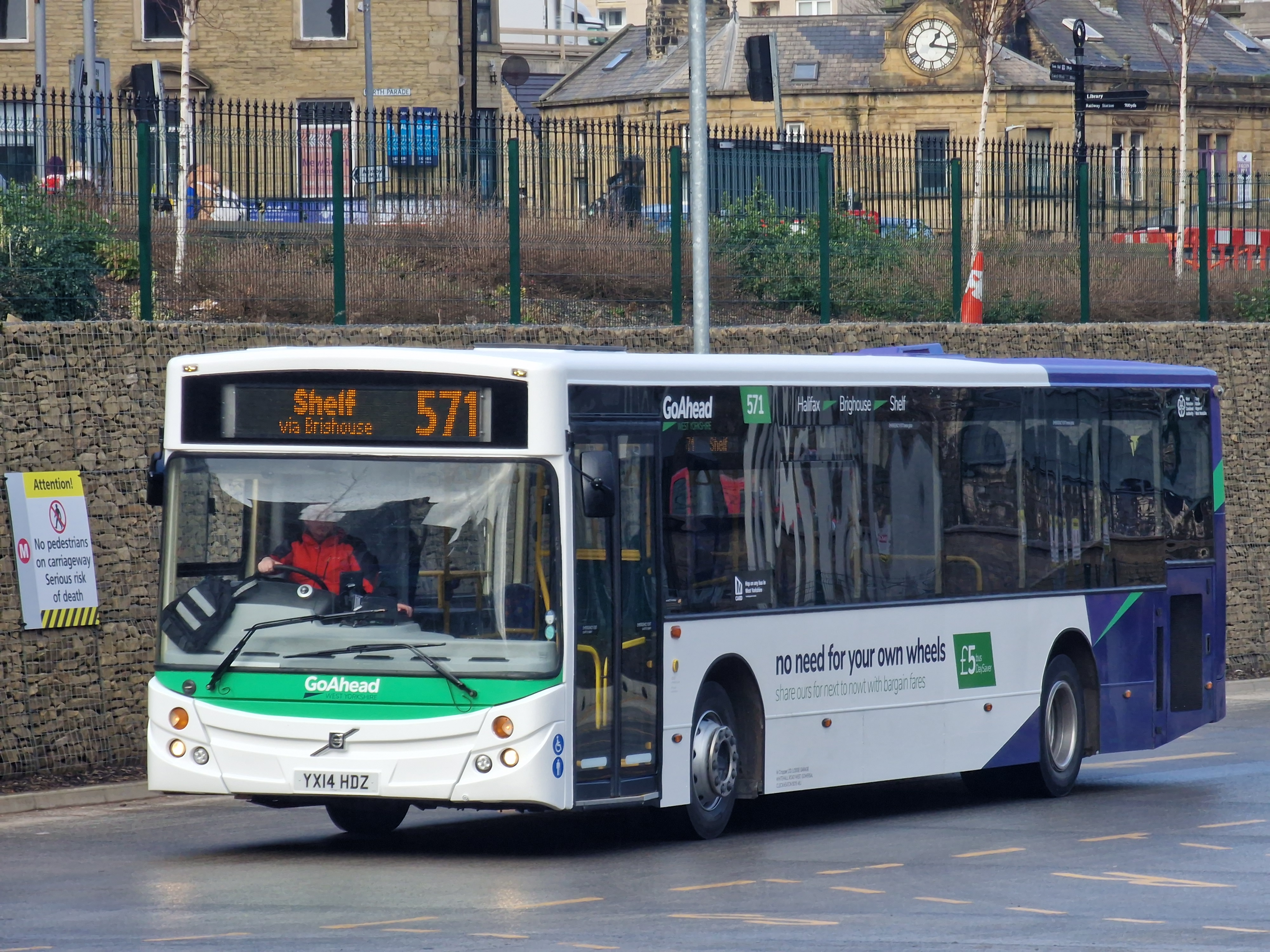
Go-Ahead West Yorkshire MCV Evolution bodied Volvo B7RLE at Huddersfield bus station in February 2025

East Yorkshire is responsible for the operations of a subsidiary company named Go-Ahead West Yorkshire, formed in late 2024 and based out of Fourway Coaches' Cleckheaton depot, one of four coach companies acquired by the Go-Ahead Group in May 2024. Go-Ahead West Yorkshire commenced operations on 23 February 2023 after acquiring the contract to run service 571 between Halifax and Shelf from Arriva Yorkshire, and runs a small number of tendered bus service contracts across the metropolitan county of West Yorkshire as of August 2025. Go-Ahead intends for the new operation to be competitive in future tendering for the West Yorkshire Combined Authority's 'Weaver Network' bus franchising scheme.

== Fleet and depots ==
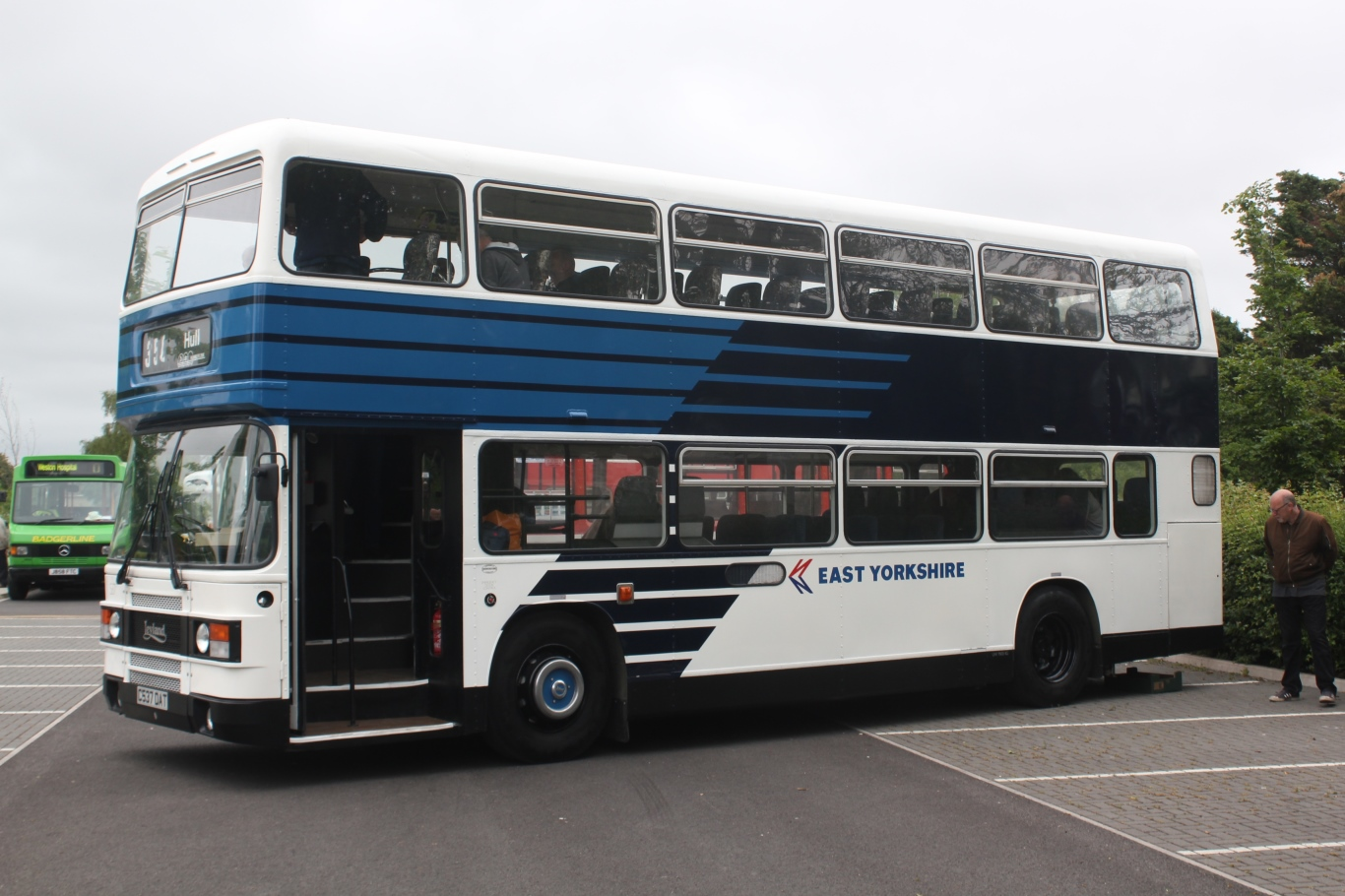
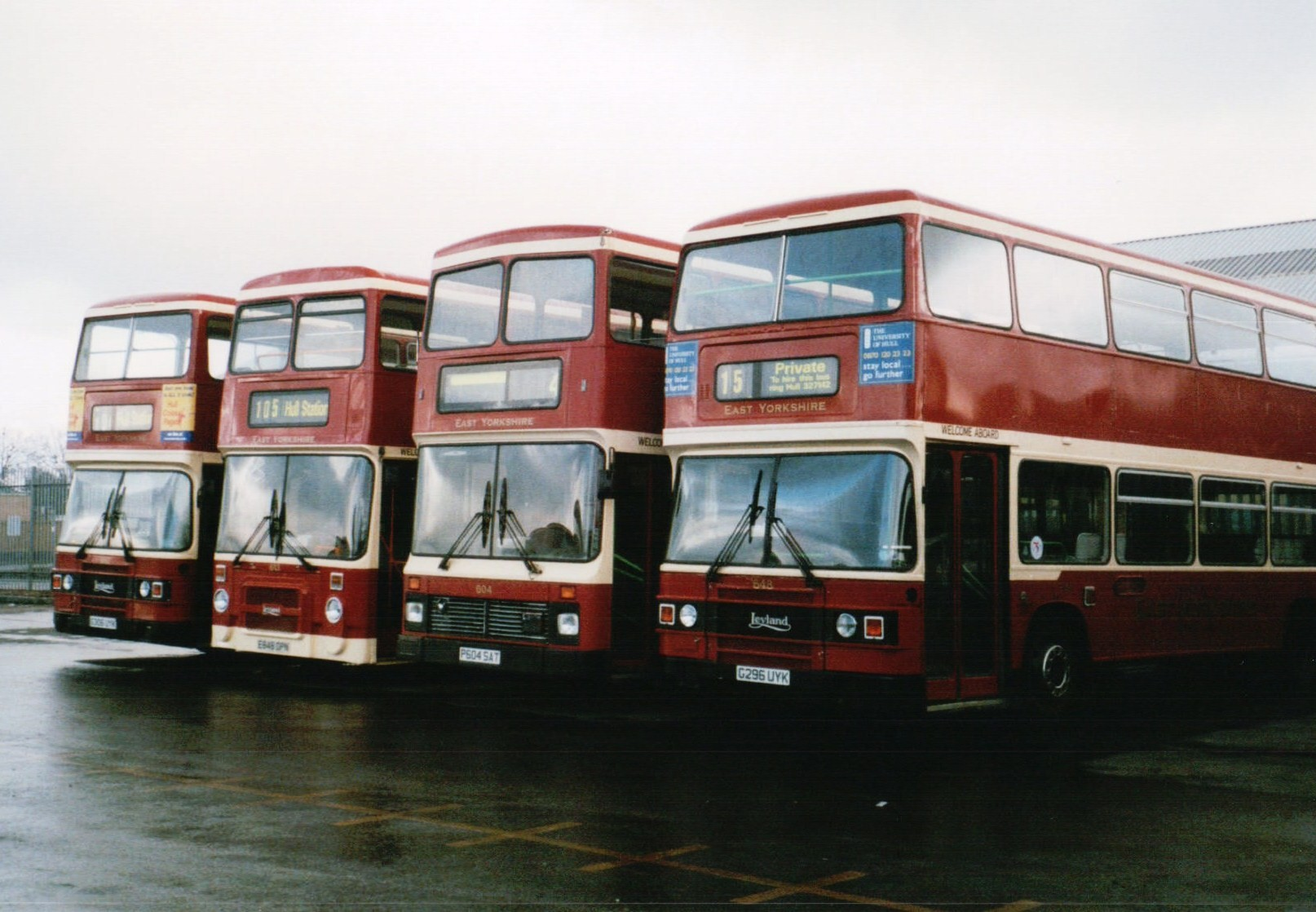
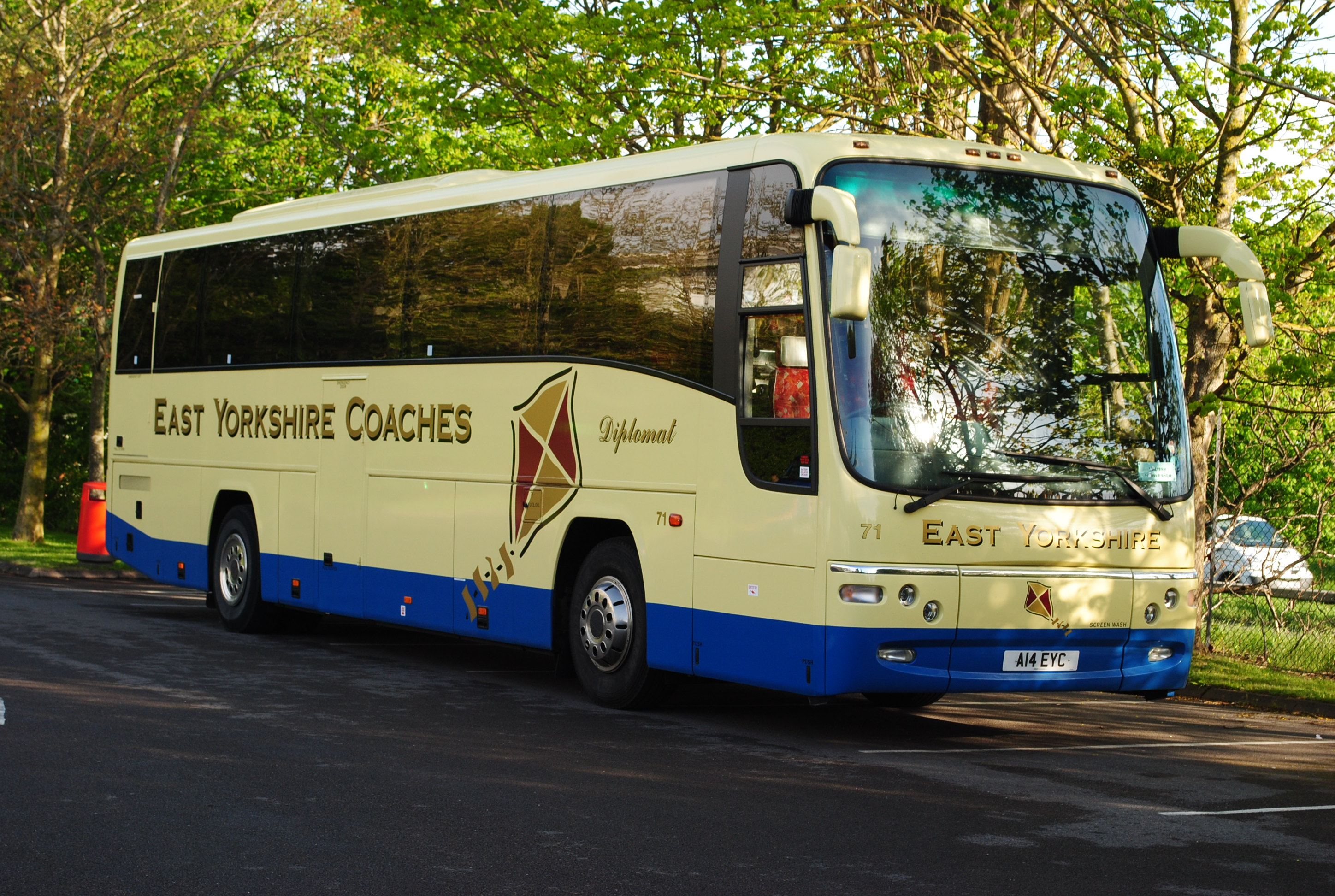
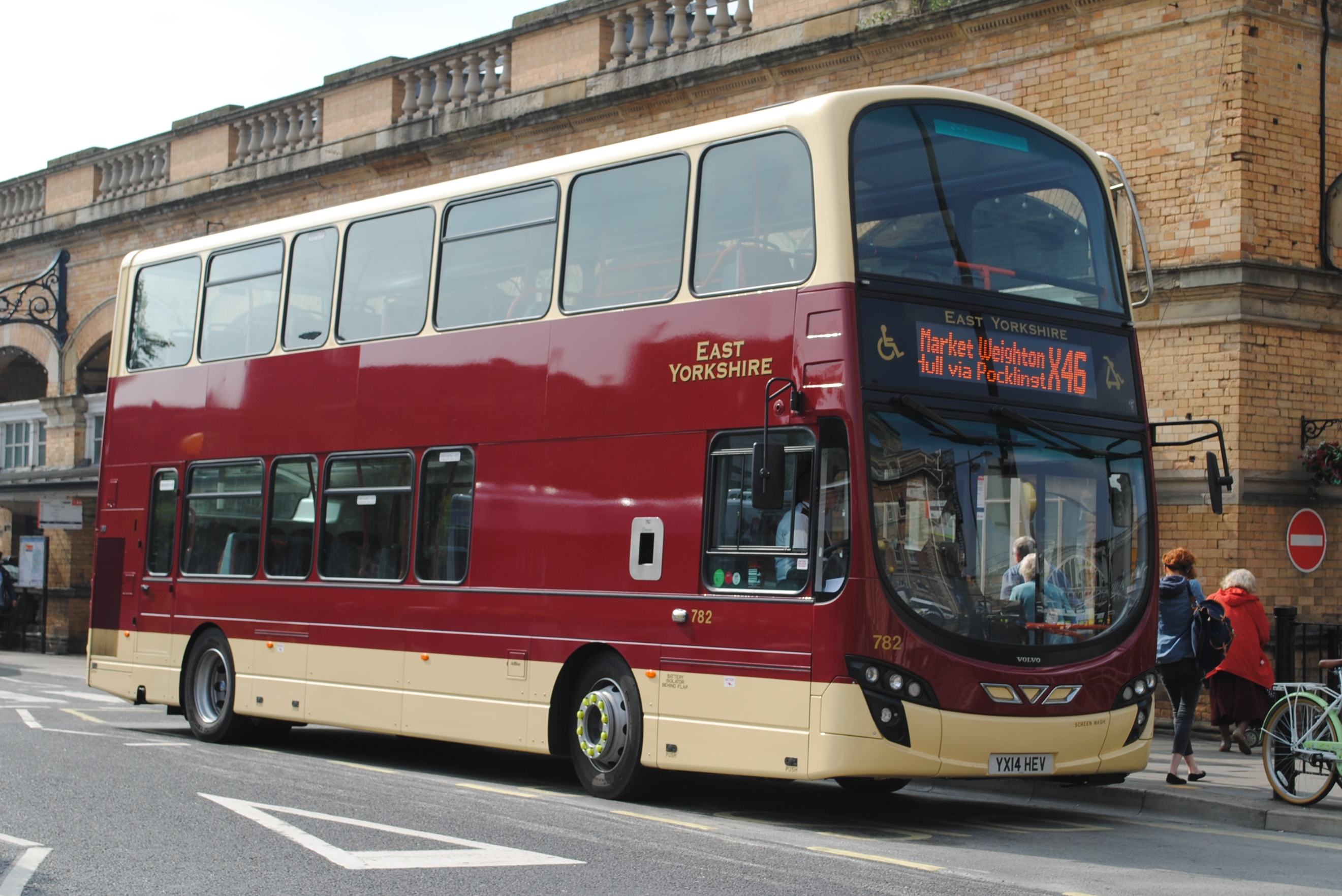
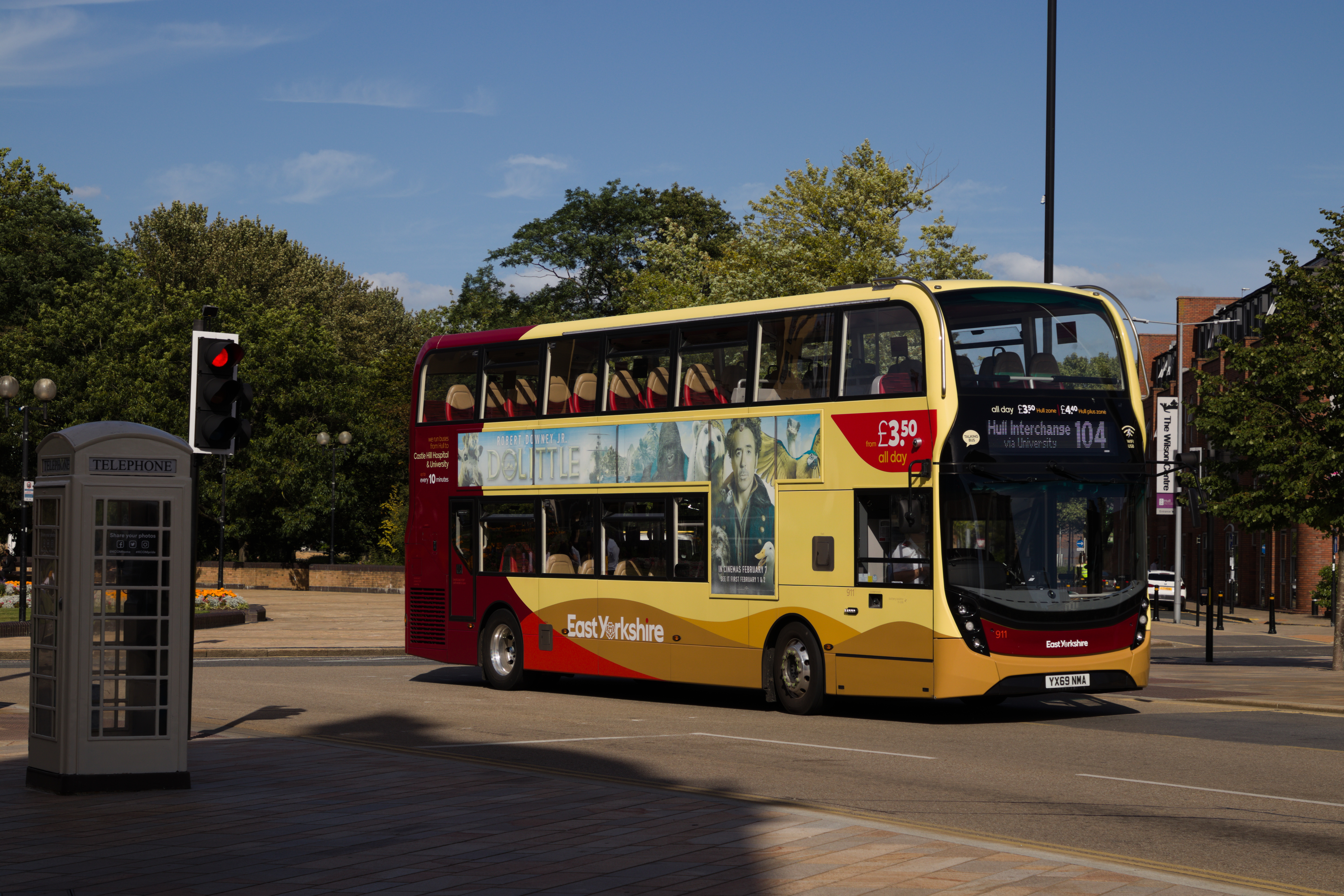
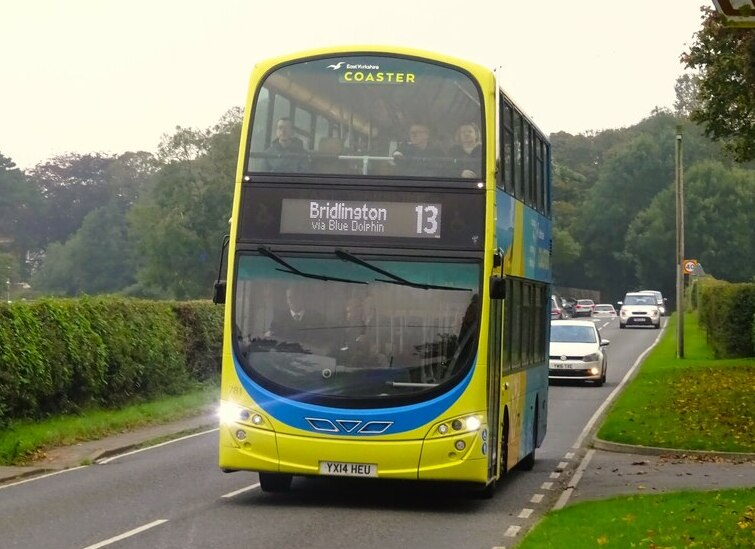
Branding: past and present

As of 15 July 2021, the East Yorkshire fleet consists of 271 buses and coaches operated from seven bus depots across East and North Yorkshire: Bridlington, Elloughton, Kingston upon Hull, Pocklington, Scarborough (Barry's Lane and Westwood Road) and Withernsea. The company's bus fleet consists mainly of diesel-powered single and double-deck buses manufactured by Alexander Dennis and Volvo; £5.7 million of funding awarded jointly to Hull City Council and East Riding of Yorkshire Council through the central government's Zero Emission Bus Regional Areas 2 (ZEBRA2) fund, as well as a £500 million investment in Wrightbus battery electric buses by the Go-Ahead Group, saw a fleet of 27 electric buses enter service with East Yorkshire from April 2026.

The company's headquarters are located at a main depot on Anlaby Road in Kingston upon Hull. The depot's offices, built into a set of 1870s Gothic Revival houses, are Grade II listed. A small fire broke out in one of the offices in December 2020, and a partial collapse of the depot's roof and frontage on 18 January 2023 destroyed a bus parked in the depot forecourt. Electric vehicle charging infrastructure to support the order for 21 Wrightbus electric buses began to be installed at Anlaby Road during November 2025.

Plans were submitted to East Riding of Yorkshire Council in late 2024 for a new East Yorkshire depot in north Hull, located along the A1079 road and south of the village of Dunswell, replacing the depots at Anlaby Road and Elloughton. This depot, situated among a 500-space park and ride including three drive-through outlet, is planned to house over 200 buses, twelve maintenance bays and have capabilities for charging points for electric buses, however objections were made in a January 2025 public consultation by Yorkshire Water in relation to its siting over public water mains, as well as residents living near the planned depot site. The planning application, set to cost £40 million to construct, was eventually withdrawn on 17 March 2025 after further objections were made, with developers Ashcourt set to resubmit a modified plan for a depot on the site.

A new depot for Scarborough's bus services, feature charging points for a potential investment in electric buses, is to be built on Taylor Way in Eastfield, replacing both the Barry's Lane and Westwood Road sites.

== In media ==
In July 2014, the company was the subject of an eight-part documentary series, On The Yorkshire Buses. The documentary originally aired on Channel 5 and was narrated by Simon Farnaby.

In April 2021, the company was the subject of an episode of Dom Digs In, which aired on BBC One. Narrated by Dominic Littlewood and filmed over the course of a week during the COVID-19 pandemic, the episode sees Dominic take on a number of roles at the company's Hull depot.
