= Twin keel =

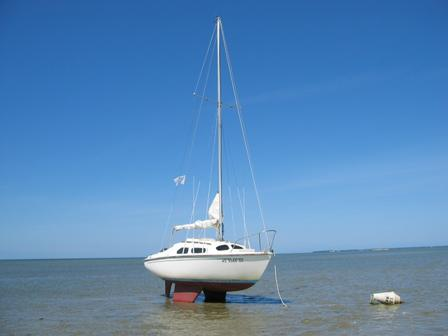
An English-made Hurley twin-keeled sailboat at low tide

Twin keels or bilge keels are two keels that emerge at an angle from the hull of a sailboat (and some ships), at or near the bilge. The angle allows the boat to have a shallower draft while still allowing for minimum leeway while sailing. The placement of the twin keels also allows the boat to stand upright when out of the water without additional support, as opposed to a single-keeled boat that would fall over if water levels dropped. Twin-keeled boats are typically used in coastal areas that experience extreme changes in tide. When the tide is low, the boat will sit on her keels and remain stable and upright. This configuration is especially useful for sailors in Britain and might in the future be applied in the parts of the Atlantic North America that are extremely tidal such as the Fundy waters that are shared by Maine, New Brunswick, and Nova Scotia.

Twin keels are meant to make sailing safer and easier in shallow or extremely tidal waters while preserving the stability and performance of deep-keel vessels. Yet, twin keels are often shown to provide better theoretical performance on paper, and, in reality, are only slightly slower performing when compared with single keels on identical vessels. They are also said to be safer in downwind conditions as they are more resistant to rolling, and hence should not broach as easily. (Broaching can occur when a boat "surfs" down a wave and its stern gets lifted and pushed by the wave, causing the vessel to turn sharply, and is then rolled over by the wave.)

== Twin keel vessels ==
=== Bluebird, the first model ===
The first twin-keeled sailing vessel is widely believed to be the Bluebird that was built by Lord Riverdale and launched in 1924. Despite being the first twin-keeled yacht, and being built without much in the way of guiding engineering and science, it was quite radical as it had twin rudders (as racers have today), and a long narrow hull with a pointed, or "canoe," stern. This gave her speed and seaworthiness, and the ability to point closely to the wind. The vessel's other characteristics included self-steering ability, efficiency under power, and structural strength. The most notable benefit presented at the time was care-free grounding that includes the ability to sail away from a grounding incident by righting the vessel.

=== Bluebird of Thorne (1st and 2nd) ===
Riverdale succeeded the Bluebird with two vessels named Bluebird of Thorne. The first was a step backwards in that it re-introduced a normal keel as a place for ballast and to collect bilgewater. It is advanced, nonetheless, as its fins were aft of the center keel, and its rudders extended from the fins.

The second returned to the pure twin keeled and twin rudder model of the pioneering Bluebird, but as it was designed in the early 1960s, it had the benefit of forty more years of naval engineering development. (Rather than being canoe-sterned, it had a small transom.) The total performance gains by this Bluebird of Thorne over Riverdale's previous twin keelers was about 15%. One performance "tweak" was giving slight toe-in to the keels to produce better upwind performance. Her ocean handling was considered to be safer than similar single-keeled craft as she rolls less, and is hence less likely to broach going downwind.

Both Bluebird of Thornes were built from steel and are still sailing.

=== Hunter Horizons ===
David Thomas engineered twin keel designs that were used successfully in Hunter's production line of cruisers in the UK starting in the 1980s, and production continues today. The majority of these are in the Horizon line, ranging from about 20 feet to 35 feet and longer. They are exceedingly aesthetic and accommodating craft, have been produced in large numbers, and many have performed well in competition—tending to come in second. An added and probably unexpected advantage of the Horizons with a twin keel arrangement is that they hold their value better than single keel equivalents. Similar vessels are produced by Westerly and Moody

=== HEOL 7.4 twin lifting keels, a current model ===
The HEOL 7.4, design by Martin Defline is a current example of the ocean-going evolution of the racing dingy that uses twin keels; it is similar in size and characteristics to the Classe Mini. The twin keels are lifting; the windward (or upwind), keel (or fin), hinges aft (or backwards) and lays against the side of the hull. There is a 250 kg bulb, or weight, at the end of each keel that is shaped such that it remains hydrodynamic when lifted. The HEOL 7.4 is also built with a single fin keel, which allows for a comparison between single and twin keels in a state-of-the-art context.

== Competition comparison between twin and fin keeled HEOL models ==
When the fin keeled and lifting keel HEOLs have raced each other, the fin keel model has been shown to only have a slight edge. In low or no wind conditions, the windward appendage that is the lifted keel of the twin keel model adds slight drag. In strong wind conditions, the difference is even smaller, and an astute twin keel crew can "take" a fin keel crew if the fin keel crew becomes momentarily lax.

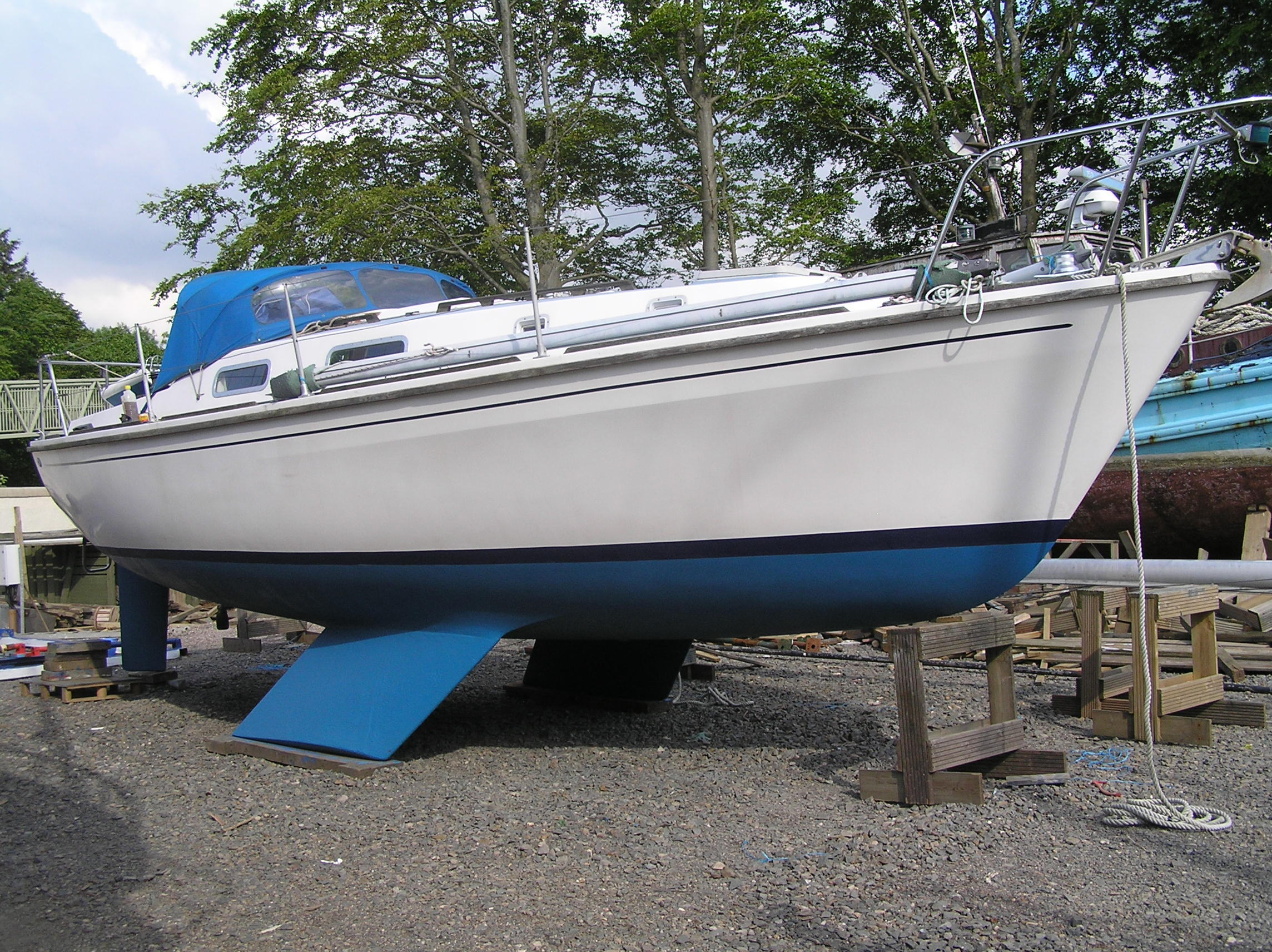
A twin-keeled Westerly Konsort
