= On the Yorkshire Buses =

British television documentary

- Genre: Documentary
- Narrated by: Simon Farnaby
- Country of origin: United Kingdom
- Original language: English
- No. of series: 1
- No. of episodes: 8 (list of episodes)

Production
- Production location: Yorkshire
- Running time: 60 minutes
- Production companies: The Garden and Motion Content Group

Original release
- Network: Channel 5
- Release: 11 July – 29 August 2014

On the Yorkshire Buses is a British television documentary programme narrated by Simon Farnaby, first broadcast on Channel 5 in the United Kingdom between 11 July and 29 August 2014. The show follows various staff from the East Yorkshire Motor Services, a bus and coach operator operating throughout Kingston upon Hull, the East Riding of Yorkshire, the North Yorkshire coast and the North York Moors, as they overcome problems to perform their daily jobs.

== Episode list ==
No.	Title	Original release date	Viewers
1	"Summer Holiday"	11 July 2014	1,300,000 (#10)
2	"The Heat Is On!"	18 July 2014	990,000 (#16)
3	"Back to School"	25 July 2014	830,000 (#13)
4	"Breaking Buses"	1 August 2014	980,000 (#14)
5	"Life in the Bus Lane"	8 August 2014	930,000 (#17)
6	"The Road to Hull"	15 August 2014	900,000 (#20)
7	"All Aboard the Night Bus"	22 August 2014 (Note: Episodes 7 and 8 were first broadcast at 19:00, whereas episodes 1 to 6 were first broadcast at 20:00.)	Below 770,000
8	"The End of the Road"	29 August 2014	Below 750,000
