= Beachcomber 25 =

Sailboat class

Development
- Designer: Walter Scott
- Location: United States
- Year: 1979
- No. built: 70
- Builder: Marine Innovators
- Name: Beachcomber 25

Boat
- Displacement: 5,200 lb (2,359 kg)
- Draft: 5.00 ft (1.52 m), centerboard down

Hull
- Type: Monohull
- Construction: Fiberglass
- LOA: 25.33 ft (7.72 m)
- LWL: 23.00 ft (7.01 m)
- Beam: 8.00 ft (2.44 m)
- Engine: Inboard diesel engine or outboard motor

Hull appendages
- Keel: centerboard
- Ballast: 1,600 lb (726 kg)
- Rudder: transom-mounted rudder

Rig
- Rig type: Ketch rig

Sails
- Sailplan: Unstayed cat ketch
- Total sail area: 275 sq ft (25.5 m^{2})

The Beachcomber 25 is a recreational keelboat built by Marine Innovators in the United States. 70 were built starting in 1979It is now out of production.

== Design ==
Designed by Walter Scott the fiberglass, hull has a plumb stem, raked transom, a transom-hung rudder controlled by a tiller and a retractable centerboard. It displaces 5,200 lb (2,359 kg) and carries 1,600 lb (726 kg) of ballast in its grounding shoe.

The boat two centerboard configurations. One has a fixed keel and centerboard and it has a draft of 5.00 ft (1.52 m) with the centerboard extended and 2.50 ft (0.76 m) with it retracted. The other has a centerboard that retracts into a trunk and it has a draft of 5.42 ft (1.65 m) with the centreboard extended and 1.00 ft (0.30 m) with it retracted, allowing beaching or ground transportation on a trailer. The centerboard is retracted with a 4:1 tackle.

It has an unstayed cat ketch or, optionally, a sloop rig. The cat ketch rig uses wishbone booms and unstayed, rotating, deck-mounted masts. The sails furl around the rotating masts and have sheets, outhauls and topping lifts. There are no mainsheet travelers or boom vangs fitted.

The boat can be fitted with an inboard diesel engine or a small outboard motor for docking and maneuvering. The fuel tank holds 19 U.S. gallons (72 L; 16 imp gal).

Accommodation consists of a forward "V"-berth, plus a cabin quarter berth and L-shaped settee. The galley is located on the port side forward, just behind the "V"-berth. The head is a portable type and includes ventilation and a teak door for privacy.

The design has a hull speed of 6.43 kn (11.91 km/h).

The designer noted, "The main advantages of the cat ketch sail plan of the BEACHCOMBER 25 are its simplicity and ease of handling combined with good performance. The sails unfurl from the masts like window shades, controlled from the cockpit, with no need to go forward except to release mooring lines or haul up the anchor. Once the sails have been unfurled, you set up on the clew outhauls which also lead to the cockpit. A small winch is required in the case of the mainsail in order to obtain the desired degree of sail flatness. This is the last time you will have to touch the winch unless you reef or for the refinement of easing the outhaul for more sail draft off the wind."

In a 2010 review Steve Henkel wrote of the design, "best features: The Beachcomber has a 1,400 pound grounding shoe and an extremely shallow, 15-inch draft, so she can be run up on a beach or mud flats—plus a high-efficiency centerboard for going to windward. The cabin is large and comfortable with a poptop for tall sailors. Worst features: Learning the knack of sailing this type of craft may take a while; quite different from a standard sloop. The long grounding shoe acts like a long keel; increasing directional stability but reducing the ability to tack quickly."
