= Beachcomber... By the Way =

BBC radio series

- Running time: 30 minutes
- Country of origin: United Kingdom
- Language: English
- Home station: BBC Radio 4
- Starring: Richard Ingrams; John Wells; Patricia Routledge; John Sessions; Brian Perkins
- Original release: 18 March 1989 – 14 December 1994
- No. of episodes: 18

Beachcomber... By the Way is a radio programme that aired from March 1989 to December 1994. There were 18 half-hour episodes and it was broadcast on BBC Radio 4, and was later rerun on BBC Radio 7. It starred Richard Ingrams, John Wells, Patricia Routledge, John Sessions and Brian Perkins.

The programme was based on the long-running humorous column "By the Way" in the Daily Express, written by J. B. Morton under the pseudonym "Beachcomber".

== Episodes ==
=== Series one ===
No. overall	No. in series	Title	Original release date
1	1	"Episode 1"	18 March 1989
2	2	"Episode 2"	25 March 1989
3	3	"Episode 3"	1 April 1989
4	4	"Episode 4"	8 April 1989
5	5	"Episode 5"	15 April 1989
6	6	"Episode 6"	22 April 1989

=== Series two ===
No. overall	No. in series	Title	Original release date
7	1	"Episode 1"	13 July 1991
8	2	"Episode 2"	20 July 1991
9	3	"Episode 3"	27 July 1991
10	4	"Episode 4"	3 August 1991
11	5	"Episode 5"	10 August 1991
12	6	"Episode 6"	17 August 1991

=== Series three ===
No. overall	No. in series	Title	Original release date
13	1	"Episode 1"	9 November 1994
14	2	"Episode 2"	16 November 1994
15	3	"Episode 3"	23 November 1994
16	4	"Episode 4"	30 November 1994
17	5	"Episode 5"	7 December 1994
18	6	"Episode 6"	14 December 1994

== Notes and references ==
- Lavalie, John. "Beachcomber By the Way." EpGuides. 21 Jul 2005. 29 Jul 2005.
- BBC Radio programme website
