= Criticism of Israel =

Israel has faced international criticism since its establishment in 1948 relating to Zionist political violence and a variety of other issues, many of which are centered around human rights violations related to the Nakba and the Israeli occupation of the West Bank and the Gaza Strip.

Israel has been criticized for issues surrounding its establishment when most of Mandatory Palestine's Arab population fled or were expelled in 1948, the conduct of its armed forces in the Arab–Israeli conflict, establishment and expansion of illegal Israeli settlements in the Palestinian territories, its treatment of Palestinians, and the blockade of the Gaza Strip, with its impact on the economy of Palestine, the country's nuclear weapons program, and its targeted killings program. Other criticized long-standing issues include: the refusal to allow post-war Palestinian refugees to return to their homes, and the prolonged occupation of territories gained in war and the construction of settlements therein. Israel's status as a representative democracy has also been questioned because Israeli residents of the occupied territories are allowed to vote in Israel's elections while Palestinian residents are not, leading to accusations of apartheid.

Criticisms of Israeli policies come from several groups: primarily from activists, within Israel and worldwide, the United Nations and other non-governmental organizations including European churches, and mass media. Media bias is often claimed by both critics and defenders of Israel.

Counter-criticisms include the assertion that some critics and their criticisms are aimed at delegitimizing Israel's right to exist which has led some to debate over the point at which criticism of Israel crosses the line into antisemitism. The term "new antisemitism" refers to criticisms deemed to have crossed this threshold.

== Subjects of criticism ==
=== Nakba ===
Clickable map of Mandatory Palestine with the depopulated locations during the 1947–1949 Palestine war, remembered as the Nakba.

The 1948 Palestine war and the establishment of the State of Israel are for Palestinians inextricable from the Nakba and the depopulation of Palestinian towns and villages. The violence, dispossession, and displacement experienced by Palestinians in the Nakba is also seen as the origin of the ongoing Nakba, an ongoing process of fragmentation of Palestinian society and denial of Palestinian self-determination.

=== Palestinian refugees ===
Palestinian refugees are defined by the UN as Arabs who lived in Palestine for at least two years prior to 1948 and their descendants, and who fled or were expelled from their homes during and after the 1948 Palestine War.

The causes and responsibilities of the exodus are a matter of controversy among historians and commentators of the conflict. Whereas historians now agree on most of the events of that period, there remains disagreement as to whether the exodus was the result of a plan designed before or during the war by Zionist leaders or was an unintended consequence of the war.

Significant international pressure was placed on both sides during the Lausanne Conference of 1949 to resolve the refugee crisis. The parties signed a joint protocol on the framework for a comprehensive peace, which included territories, refugees, and Jerusalem, in which Israel agreed "in principle" to allow the return of all of the Palestinian refugees. According to New Historian Ilan Pappe, this Israeli agreement was made under pressure from the United States, and because the Israelis wanted United Nations membership, which required Israeli agreement to allow the return of all refugees. Once Israel was admitted to the UN, it retreated from the protocol it had signed because it was completely satisfied with the status quo and saw no need to make any concessions with regard to the refugees or on boundary questions. This led to significant and sustained international criticism.

==== Allegations of ethnic cleansing ====
In The Ethnic Cleansing of Palestine, Ilan Pappe argued that Israel's policy during the 1948 Palestine war constitutes ethnic cleansing: "over 400 Palestinian villages were deliberately destroyed, civilians were massacred, and around a million men, women, and children were expelled from their homes at gunpoint". However, Pappe's work has been subject to significant criticism and allegations of fabrication by other historians. Israeli historian Benny Morris called Pappe "At best ... one of the world's sloppiest historians; at worst, one of the most dishonest." When asked about the 1948 Palestinian expulsion from Lydda and Ramle, he responded, "there are circumstances in history that justify ethnic cleansing. I know that this term is completely negative in the discourse of the 21st century, but when the choice is between ethnic cleansing and genocide – the annihilation of your people – I prefer ethnic cleansing. [...] There was no choice but to expel that population. It was necessary to cleanse the hinterland and cleanse the border areas and cleanse the main roads. It was necessary to cleanse the villages from which our convoys and our settlements were fired on." He also added in 2008, that "There was no Zionist 'plan' or blanket policy of evicting the Arab population, or of 'ethnic cleansing'. Plan Dalet (Plan D), of 10 March 1948 ... was the master plan ... to counter the expected pan-Arab assault on the emergent Jewish state".

=== Occupation and annexation of neighboring territories ===
Map of territories under Israeli occupation after the 1967 Arab–Israeli War, including the Sinai Peninsula, the Golan Heights, East Jerusalem, the West Bank, and the Gaza Strip.

The territories occupied by Israel from Egypt, Jordan, and Syria after the Six-Day War of 1967 have been designated as occupied territory by the United Nations and many other international organisations, governments and others. They consist of the West Bank and much of the Golan Heights. From the Six-Day War until 1982, the Sinai Peninsula was occupied by Israel, but it was returned to Egypt in the Egypt–Israel peace treaty. The Gaza Strip was also occupied by Israel until its unilateral disengagement. UN Security Council resolution 242, emphasized "the inadmissibility of the acquisition of territory by war," setting the stage for controversy on the legal status of areas captured in 1967, and in 1948. There are two interpretations of international law on this matter:

=== Israeli settlements ===
The participating High Contracting Parties to the Fourth Geneva Convention, numerous UN resolutions, the International Court of Justice and other instances have ruled that Israel's policy of establishing civilian settlements in territories considered occupied, including in East Jerusalem, is illegal. Israel disputes the notion that the West Bank and in particular East Jerusalem are occupied under international law, though this view is dismissed internationally.

Israel's settlement policy has drawn harsh criticism from the United States and the European Union.

Ali Jarbawi called the policy as "one of the only remaining settler-colonial occupations in the world today". In his book Hollow Land: Israel's Architecture of Occupation, Eyal Weizman describes Israel's policy as a "political system at the heart of this complex and terrifying project of late-modern colonial occupation".

The international community criticized Israel for "failing to protect the Palestinian population" from Israeli settler violence.

=== Israeli apartheid and human rights ===
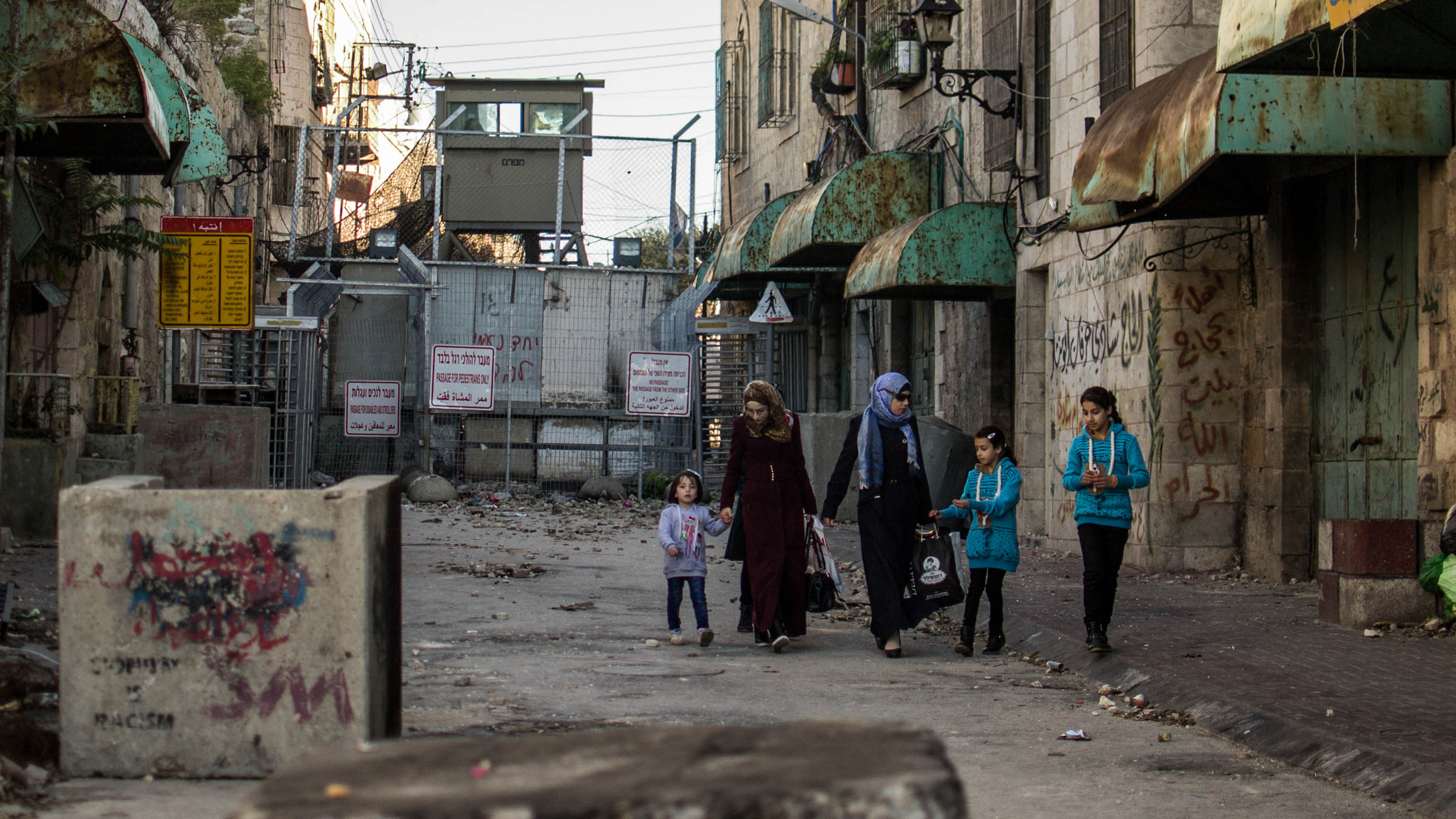
The Palestinian side of an Israeli checkpoint on Al-Shuhada Street in Hebron, Occupied West Bank, Nov 2015

Human Rights Watch (HRW) has said Israel operates a "two-tier" judicial system in areas of the occupied Palestinian territories it administers, to an effect which provides preferential services, development, and benefits for Israelis living in settlements in the occupied territories while imposing harsh conditions on Palestinians and other non-Israeli citizens. In some cases Israel has acknowledged differential treatment of Palestinians and Israelis, such as having separate roads for both communities and operating checkpoints for Palestinians, asserting that the measures are necessary to protect Israelis from attacks by Palestinian armed groups. In 2011, the Israeli parliament passed a law criminalizing participation in boycotts of Israeli settlements. The law drew criticism from the EU, the United States and the Anti-Defamation League.

==== Imprisonment ====
Amnesty International reported that in 2009 hundreds of Palestinians were detained and held incommunicado for extended periods of time by Israel. While most were later released without charge, hundreds were tried before military courts whose procedures often failed to meet international standards for fair trial. According to Amnesty, almost all Palestinian prisoners were held in violation of international humanitarian law, which prohibits the transfer of detainees to the territory of the occupying power (i.e., Israel proper). It claimed that about 300 minors and 550 adults were held without charge or trial for more than a year.

In 2011, UN Secretary-General Ban Ki-Moon said Israel held thousands of Palestinians as prisoners, and called on Israel to release them. Ban said the release of political prisoners would "serve as a significant confidence-building measure" and boost prospects of peace in the region. Also Amnesty International has called on Israel to release political prisoners, saying "all political prisoners held without charge or trial should be tried in fair trials or immediately released". Israel objects to releasing prisoners, many of whom have been convicted by Israeli courts for violent crimes such as murder. However, several prisoner release deals have been conducted by Israel as a gesture in negotiations, many which involved the release of hundreds or more prisoners.

According to Amnesty International, methods of torture used by Israel on Palestinian prisoners include prolonged tying in painful stress positions, sleep deprivation and threats to harm detainees' families. Beatings and other ill-treatment of detainees are common during and following arrest and during transfer from one location to another.

==== Treatment of ethnic and religious minorities ====
Organizations such as Amnesty International, the Association for Civil Rights in Israel (ACRI), the Israeli government-appointed Or Commission, and the United States Department of State have published reports that document racism and discrimination directed towards racial and ethnic groups in Israel.

According to a study commissioned by Israel's Courts administration and Israel Bar Association, Arab Israelis who have been charged with certain types of crime are more likely than their Jewish counterparts to be convicted, and once convicted they are more likely to be sent to prison. The study also found differences in lengths of prison sentences given, with the average prison sentence at nine and a half months for Jews and 14 months for Arabs.

Rights groups have said that anti-discrimination employment laws in Israel are rarely enforced. A coalition of nine Israeli rights groups has opposed a practice under which companies can advertise their policy to hire only Jewish Israelis, and no Arab Israelis. Companies advertising under a "Hebrew labor" banner adhere to a segregated employment philosophy derived from a practice by Jewish immigrants in Palestine in the first half of the 20th century which was meant to strengthen emerging Israeli industry from British and Arab influence.

=== Military practices ===
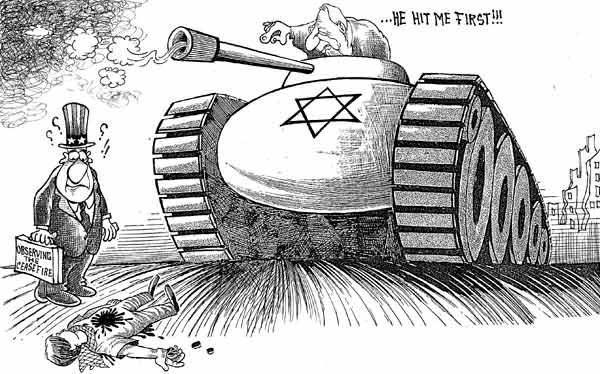
A political cartoon by Lebanese cartoonist Mahmoud Kahil criticizing the policies of Ariel Sharon

==== Neighbor Procedure ====
The IDF acknowledged using the "Neighbor Procedure" or the "Early Warning Procedure", in which the IDF would encourage a Palestinian acquaintance of a wanted man to try to convince him to surrender. This practice was criticized by some as using "human shields", an allegation the IDF denied, saying that it never forced people into carrying out the Neighbor Procedure; and that Palestinians "volunteered" to prevent excess loss of life. Amnesty International and Human Rights Watch are among the groups who made the "human shield" comparison. The Israeli group B'Tselem also made the comparison, saying that "for a long period of time following the outbreak of the second intifada Operation Defensive Shield, in April 2002, the IDF systematically used Palestinian civilians as human shields, forcing them to carry out military actions which threatened their lives". The Neighbor Procedure was outlawed by the Supreme Court of Israel in 2005 but some groups say the IDF continues to use it, although they say the number of instances has dropped sharply.

==== Possession of weapons of mass destruction ====
Israel is believed to possess a nuclear arsenal of about 150 weapons, and has been criticised for maintaining nuclear weapons and for not agreeing to a nuclear-free Middle East zone. In September 2009, the IAEA passed a resolution that "expresses concern about the Israeli nuclear capabilities, and calls upon Israel to accede to the NPT and place all its nuclear facilities under comprehensive IAEA safeguards..."

Israel has signed the Chemical Weapons Convention but not ratified it, citing neighbouring states that have not done so either. Israel is widely believed to have chemical weapons, but officials have never directly admitted it, although in 1990 Science Minister Yuval Neeman threatened to retaliate against an Iraqi chemical-weapons strike "with the same merchandise". Israel has not signed the Biological Weapons Convention.

==== Targeted killings of individuals ====
Amnesty International has condemned Israel's policy of assassinations targeting individuals. Israeli officials have admitted that the policy exists and is being pursued, saying it helps prevent acts of terrorism from being committed against Israel. The United States has a very similar policy. Criticism has also been raised from some on the Israeli left, who say assassination policy is "gangster behavior" unbecoming of a government and is against Israeli law. Israel's Supreme Court has ruled that assassinations are illegal, but leaked documents suggest that Israel's army has ignored the ruling.

=== Judaization of Jerusalem ===
The term Judaization of Jerusalem refers to the view that Israel has sought to transform the physical and demographic landscape of Jerusalem to correspond with a vision of a united and fundamentally Jewish Jerusalem under Israeli sovereignty.

The United Nations has criticised Israel's efforts to change the demographic makeup of Jerusalem in several resolutions. All legislative and administrative measures taken by Israel, which have altered or aimed to alter the character, legal status and demographic composition of Jerusalem, are described by the UN as "null and void" and having "no validity whatsoever". Richard Falk, an investigator with the U.N. Human Rights Council, said that Israel's expansion of East Jerusalem settlements and evictions of Palestinian residents can "only be described in its cumulative impact as a form of ethnic cleansing".

In a 2008 report, John Dugard, independent investigator for the United Nations Human Rights Council, cites the Judaization of Jerusalem among many examples of Israeli policies "of colonialism, apartheid or occupation" that create a context in which Palestinian terrorism is "an inevitable consequence".

=== The Law of Return ===
Israel has enacted a Law of Return that allows Jews from anywhere in the world a fast-track to Israeli citizenship. Palestinian refugees cannot apply for Israeli citizenship under the law since they are not Jewish, though they can apply for Israeli citizenship through the conventional channel. The law has drawn criticism from the Cairo Institute for Human Rights Studies which says the law is a "main example of Israeli laws that discriminate against Palestinian Arabs". The American-Arab Anti-Discrimination Committee says the contrast between the Law of Return and Israeli opposition to the right of return of Palestinian refugees exhibits "barefaced racism". More than 1,000 American Jews have backed a campaign entitled "Breaking the Law of Return", saying the Law of Return creates an ethnically exclusive citizenship, which they see as unjust.

Critics claim that the guaranteed right for Jews to immigrate to Israel is discriminatory to non-Jews and therefore runs counter to the democratic value of equality under the law. Others say Israel, like any other nation, has a right under international law to determine who becomes a citizen.

=== Current government ===
Former Israeli Prime Minister Ehud Barak stated the current Netanyahu Israeli government is "infected by seeds of fascism" and "needs to be brought down." Zionist Union MK Tzipi Livni stated the government was in a state of "crisis — not only of leadership but of ethics."

== Crimes against humanity ==
=== Accusations of apartheid ===
Comparisons between apartheid South Africa and Israel are increasingly made. Israelis recoil at the analogy, but the parallel is widely drawn in international circles.

The Association for Civil Rights in Israel, a group in Israel with support from several EU states, asserted in 2008 that the separate road networks in the West Bank for Israelis and Palestinians, the expansion of Jewish settlements, restriction of the growth of Palestinian towns and discriminatory granting of services, budgets and access to natural resources are "a blatant violation of the principle of equality and in many ways reminiscent of the Apartheid regime in South Africa".

Israel has also been accused of apartheid by Michael Ben-Yair, Israel's attorney-general from 1993 to 1996, and Shulamit Aloni, who served as Minister for Education under Yitzhak Rabin.

In April 2021, Human Rights Watch accused Israeli officials of the crimes of apartheid and persecution under international law and called for an International Criminal Court investigation into these claims.

=== Gaza genocide and further allegations of genocide ===
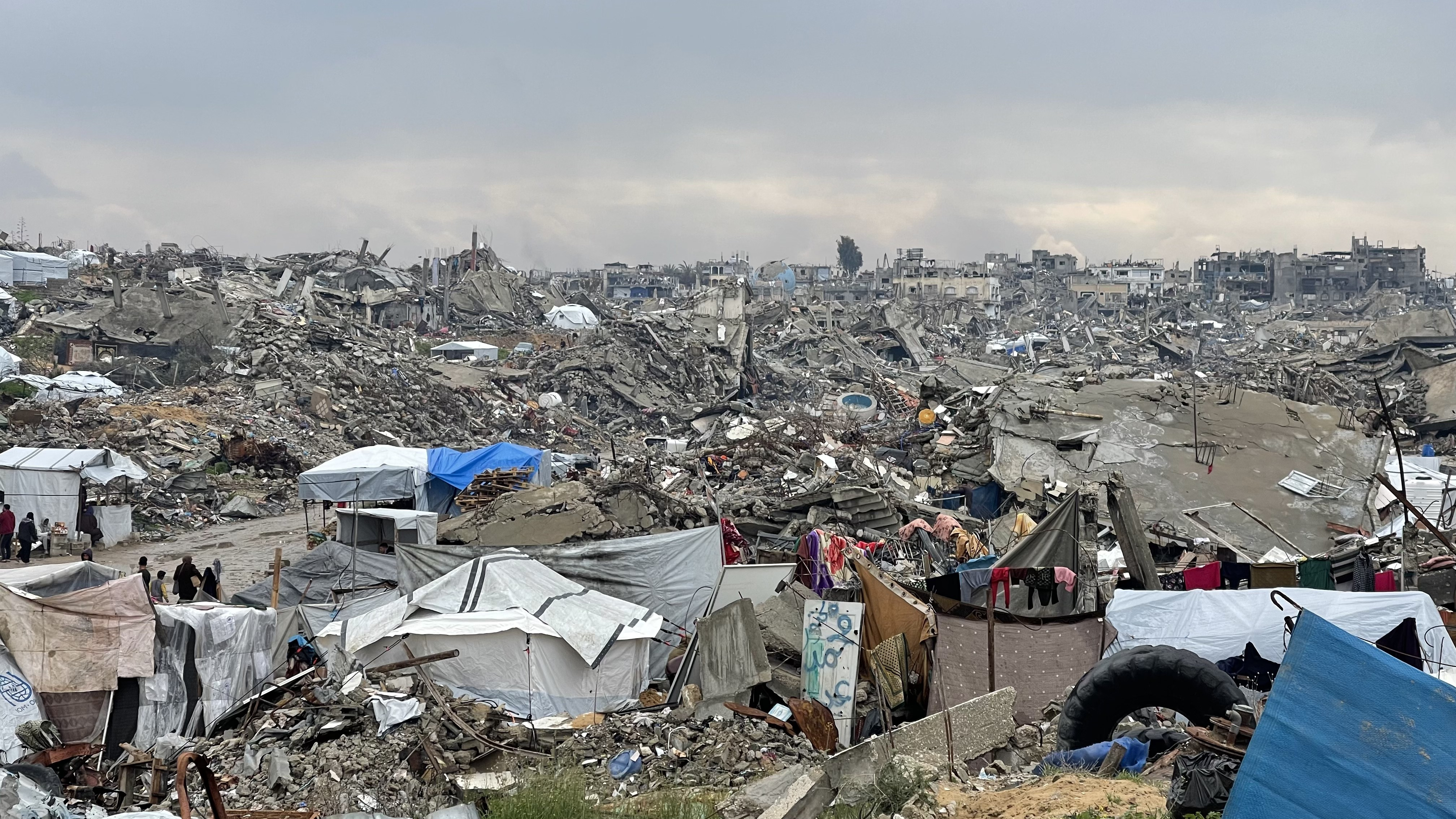
Ruins of Beit Lahia, in the Gaza Strip, destroyed by Israeli bombardments, February 23, 2025.

Some scholars and pundits have begun using the language of genocide in discussing the Israeli-Palestinian conflict, both to describe calls for the destruction of Israel and the indiscriminate killing of civilians by Hamas and other Palestinian extremist groups, and also to describe the cumulative effect of Israeli policies in the Gaza Strip.

Since then, spokespeople for both Israel and Palestine frequently accuse the other of planning a scheme of genocide. During spikes in violence in the conflict, some scholars have described attacks by Hamas as illegal under the Genocide Convention, and others such as New Historian Ilan Pappé have compared retaliation by Israel and its overall policies in the Gaza Strip as a form of genocide, often broadening the term beyond the definitions of that convention.

== Comparisons with Nazi Germany ==
Some key aspects of Israeli society are sometimes compared to Nazi Germany, directly or by allusion.

Following the 1967 Six-Day War, the Soviet Union compared Israeli tactics to those of Nazi Germany. A similar comparison was made by the Israeli Arab author Nimer Nimer. Yeshayahu Leibowitz, Israeli public intellectual, scientist, and Orthodox Jew, warned in 1982 that if the occupation continued, Israel would be in danger of succumbing to "Judeo-Nazism".

In 1984, author Israel Stockman-Shomron noted Nazi allusions in articles critical of Israel in publications including The Christian Science Monitor, The Washington Post and The New York Times.

Examples since the Second Intifada (a term describing events generally thought of as taking place from 2000 to 2005) include:

- In 2000, Nur Masalha characterized Israel's occupation of Palestine territories as comparable to the Nazi Lebensraum (living space) policy of gaining land and materials for the benefit of Germans.
- In 2002, Portuguese Nobel Prize-winning author Jose Saramago compared conditions in Ramallah to concentration camps and, in conversation with a journalist, commented that the gas-chambers would "be here before long".
- In 2004, writer Josie Sandercock described Gaza as the "largest concentration camp in the world".
- In 2005, Chilean author Luis Sepulveda wrote: "In Auschwitz and Mauthausen, in Sabra, Shatila, and Gaza, Zionism and Nazism go hand in hand".
- In 2006, Arab journalist Jihad al-Khazin wrote an article in Al-Hayat comparing Ehud Olmert to Hitler.
- In 2009, British Member of Parliament Gerald Kaufman suggested that an Israeli justification for the deaths of 1,000 Palestinians on the grounds that "500 of them were militants" represented "the reply of a Nazi", and that the same logic could have been applied in the Warsaw Ghetto.
- In 2009, Professor William I. Robinson was accused by the Anti-Defamation League of antisemitism and misconduct because his classroom materials included a visual image comparison of the Israeli attacks on Gaza to the Warsaw Ghetto. Scholars for Peace in the Middle East supported Robinson, citing academic freedom.
- In 2009 and 2010, two United Nations special rapporteurs, Richard Falk and Jean Ziegler, were criticised by pro-Israel commentators for making comparisons between policies of the Israeli government and those of Nazi Germany.
- In 2010, Israeli professor Gavriel Salomon protested against Israeli loyalty-oath legislation, and compared Israel to Nazi Germany, adding: "I am not talking about the death camps, but about the year 1935. There were no camps yet but there were racist laws. And we are heading forward towards these kinds of laws."
- In 2013, musician Roger Waters said in an American online interview, "The parallels with what went on in the 1930s in Germany are so crushingly obvious."
- In 2015, during an interview on Kol Yisrael, Ofer Cassif, a political science lecturer at the Hebrew University of Jerusalem, said: "I think it's fair to compare Israel to Germany in the 1930s, and not to the years of genocide... we have moved into a completely different phase in the history of this country. We are now the Germany of the 1930s."
- In 2018, after the Nation-State Law was passed, President of Turkey Recep Tayyip Erdoğan said the "spirit of Hitler" lives on in Israel. He said the law is designed to strengthen Israel's identity as the "national home of the Jewish people" which showed that the soul of the Nazi leader had "risen again within some of Israel's officials". He added: "There's no difference between Hitler's obsession with a pure race and the understanding that these ancient lands are just for the Jews."
- Hajo Meyer, physicist and Jewish Holocaust survivor from Auschwitz, spent the final years of his life comparing Israel's treatment of Palestinians to the Nazis in Germany.

The European Forum on Antisemitism stated that "drawing comparisons of contemporary Israeli policy to that of the Nazis" amounted to antisemitism. In 2006, the British All-Party Parliamentary Group against Antisemitism recommended that the UK Government adopt the same stance. Sociologist David Hirsh accuses anti-Zionists of double standards in their criticism of Israel, and notes that other states carry out policies similar to those of Israel without those policies being described as "Nazi". He suggests that to describe Israel as engaged in "genocide" carries an unspoken accusation comparison with the Holocaust and an equation of Zionism with Nazism. British author Howard Jacobson has suggested that comparisons between conditions faced by Palestinians and those of the Warsaw Ghetto are intended "to wound Jews in their recent and most anguished history and to punish them with their own grief" and are a form of Holocaust denial which accepts the reality of Jewish suffering but accuses Jews "of trying to profit from it". "It is as though," he says, "by a reversal of the usual laws of cause and effect, Jewish actions of today prove that Jews had it coming to them yesterday."

In May 2018, Jewish Voice for Labour and Free Speech on Israel produced a definition of antisemitism. In notes posted on the Jewish Voice for Labour website they argued that comparing Israel's actions to those of the Nazis should not automatically be seen as antisemitic: "Drawing such parallels can undoubtedly cause offence, but potent historical events and experiences are always key reference points in political debate. Whether such comparisons are antisemitic must be judged on their substantive content, and on the inferences that can reasonably be drawn about the motivation for making them, rather than on the likely degree of offence caused." In September, JVL contributed to the consultation on Labour's new code of conduct rejecting suggestions that comparisons between Israel and "features of pre-war Nazi Germany" or apartheid-era South Africa were "inherently antisemitic", and that "Such comparisons are only antisemitic if they show prejudice, hostility or hatred against Jews as Jews."

== Criticism of Israel and antisemitism ==
Supporters of Israel have characterized some criticisms of Israel or Israeli policies as antisemitic. The concept of 'new antisemitism'—that a new form of discrimination against Jews has emerged in the postwar period, especially with regard to Zionism and the State of Israel—dates to the period after the 1967 Arab–Israeli War and was popularized in The New Anti-Semitism (1974) by Arnold Forster and Benjamin Epstein of the Anti-Defamation League. Proponents of the concept of new antisemitism, such as Phyllis Chesler, Gabriel Schoenfeld and Mortimer Zuckerman, argue that, since the 1967 Six-Day War, many criticisms of Israel are veiled attacks on Jews and hence are essentially antisemitic. Abba Eban, Robert S. Wistrich, and Joschka Fischer focus on criticism of Zionism, and contend that some forms of anti-Zionism, particularly attacks on Israel's right to exist, are antisemitic in nature.

Others portray this view as an unjust equation of Israel criticism with antisemitism. Ralph Nader, Jenny Tonge, Noam Chomsky, and Desmond Tutu, for instance, suggest that equating criticism of Israel with antisemitism is inappropriate or inaccurate. John Mearsheimer, Alexander Cockburn, Norman Finkelstein, and William I. Robinson, claim that supporters of Israel sometimes equate criticism of Israel with antisemitism in a deliberate attempt to prevent legitimate criticism of Israel and discredit critics. This view has been contested by Israel supporters such as Alvin H. Rosenfeld, who argues this response is disingenuous. He states that "vigorous discussion of Israeli policy and actions is not in question", but rather statements that go well beyond legitimate criticism "and call into question Israel's right to continued existence".

Hannah Rosenthal of the United States State Department said UN double standards against Israel constitute "profound anti-semitism". Commentators such as Michael Neumann, Ian Abruma, Edward C. Corrigan and Richard Kuper have suggested singling out Israel for disproportionate criticism is warranted as a result of Israel's actions. Dina Porat (head of the Stephen Roth Institute for the Study of Contemporary Antisemitism and Racism at Tel-Aviv University) characterizes some anti-Zionist ideals as antisemitic, because they amount to singling-out Jews for special treatment, while all other comparable groups of people, including the Palestinians, are entitled to create and maintain a homeland.

=== During the Gaza war and genocide ===
During the Gaza war and Gaza genocide, efforts to deny that Israel has committed genocide against Palestinians have included exploiting the accusation of antisemitism to delegitimize such statements and to characterize those making them as antisemites. Leaders and supporters of Israel have criticized such statements in strong terms as a kind of "blood libel".

=== Post-2024 U.S. right-wing criticism of U.S. support for Israel ===
Following the escalation of the Gaza war into 2024 to 2025, a set of U.S. right-wing media figures and activists criticized continued American support for Prime Minister Benjamin Netanyahu's prosecution of the conflict, often framing the U.S.-Israel relationship as inconsistent with an America First foreign policy. Tucker Carlson characterized the relationship as "deeply destructive and humiliating" and argued that Netanyahu had boasted of his influence over U.S. policy, in a video released on the Tucker Carlson Network. Libertarian comedian Dave Smith pressed a noninterventionist case against funding or abetting the war, arguing that the campaign was producing more violence, on Lex Fridman Podcast #464 and in subsequent appearances. Conservative broadcaster Megyn Kelly publicly questioned continued U.S. backing, saying Israel had "made itself the villain of the world" and that it was "time to wrap it up," in a July 2025 interview clip circulated by Piers Morgan Uncensored. Candace Owens opposed U.S. funding and labeled Netanyahu's coalition "ultranationalist, messianic" and "not America's ally," in posts across her channels and in a video arguing that Christian doctrine does not mandate political support for Israel. Hard-right influencer Nick Fuentes amplified the slogan "America First, not Israel First" while urging withdrawal of U.S. support.

Polling showed strong receptivity to these arguments among younger voters. In an Economist/YouGov survey fielded August 15 to 18, 2025, 59% of adults aged 18 to 29 favored decreasing or stopping U.S. military aid to Israel, including 43% who favored stopping all aid, and in the same poll 44% of 18 to 29 year olds sympathized more with Palestinians and 17% with Israelis. Gallup reported in July 2025 that 32% of U.S. adults supported Israel's military action in Gaza, a series low. Pew Research Center reported in April 2025 that a majority of Americans held an unfavorable view of Israel, up 11 points since 2022, with the largest shifts among younger adults.

Results of 2025 Pew Research Center poll Views of Israel by country (sorted by net positive, Pos – Neg)
| Country polled | Pos. | Neg. | Neutral | Pos – Neg |
|---|---|---|---|---|
| Turkey | 4% | 93% | 3% | -89 |
| Japan | 13% | 79% | 8% | -66 |
| Indonesia | 17% | 80% | 3% | -63 |
| Netherlands | 19% | 78% | 3% | -59 |
| Spain | 18% | 75% | 7% | -57 |
| Sweden | 20% | 75% | 5% | -55 |
| Australia | 25% | 74% | 1% | -49 |
| Greece | 23% | 72% | 5% | -49 |
| Poland | 16% | 62% | 22% | -46 |
| Italy | 29% | 66% | 5% | -37 |
| Mexico | 24% | 61% | 15% | -37 |
| France | 28% | 63% | 9% | -35 |
| Germany | 31% | 64% | 5% | -33 |
| Canada | 33% | 60% | 7% | -33 |
| United Kingdom | 30% | 61% | 9% | -31 |
| South Korea | 31% | 60% | 9% | -31 |
| Brazil | 32% | 58% | 10% | -26 |
| Argentina | 26% | 46% | 28% | -20 |
| South Africa | 34% | 52% | 14% | -18 |
| Hungary | 36% | 53% | 11% | -17 |
| United States | 45% | 53% | 2% | -8 |
| India | 34% | 29% | 36% | +5 |
| Kenya | 50% | 42% | 8% | +8 |
| Nigeria | 59% | 32% | 9% | +25 |

=== Distinguishing legitimate criticism of Israel from antisemitism ===
==== The Three Ds of antisemitism ====
Natan Sharansky, former Soviet dissident and Israeli Minister, suggested a three-part test to distinguish legitimate criticism of Israel from antisemitic attacks. Sharansky's tests that identify a criticism as antisemitic are:

1. Demonization – when Israeli actions are blown so far out of proportion that the account paints Israel as the embodiment of all evil.
2. Double Standards – when Israel is criticized soundly for an action or policy that any other government would be viewed as justified in doing, like protecting its citizens from terrorism.
3. Delegitimization: a denial of Israel's right to exist or the right of the Jewish people to live securely in a homeland.

Sharansky believes that some criticisms involve applying an especially high moral standard to Israel, higher than applied to other countries (particularly compared to surrounding countries), yet the only special characteristic of Israel is that it is a Jewish state, hence there is an element of antisemitism.

Delegitimization was a factor addressed by Abba Eban, who claimed that efforts to deny "the equal rights of the Jewish people its lawful sovereignty within the community of nations" constituted antisemitism.

==== European Monitoring Centre on Racism and Xenophobia ====
The European Monitoring Centre on Racism and Xenophobia (EUMC, later renamed as the European Union's Fundamental Rights Agency) prepared a report in 2003 that distinguished criticism of Israel from antisemitism by testing whether "Israel is seen as being a representative of 'the Jew'": if the speaker is considering Israel as a representative of Jews in general, then antisemitism is deemed to be underlying the criticism.

The EUMC published a draft of an operational definition of antisemitism called Working Definition of Antisemitism which accompanied a report by the EUMC on report that summarized antisemitism in Europe. The EUMC working definition included five kinds of behaviors related to criticism of Israel that might be manifestations of antisemitism:

1. Denying the Jewish people their right to self-determination, e.g., by claiming that the existence of a State of Israel is a racist endeavor.
2. Applying double standards by requiring of it a behavior not expected or demanded of any other democratic nation.
3. Using the symbols and images associated with classic antisemitism (e.g., claims of Jews killing Jesus or blood libel) to characterize Israel or Israelis.
4. Drawing comparisons of contemporary Israeli policy to that of the Nazis.
5. Holding Jews collectively responsible for actions of the state of Israel.

This part of the definition has proved highly contentious and is seen by many as attempting to proscribe legitimate criticism of the human rights record of the Israeli Government by attempting to bring any criticism of Israel into the category of antisemitism, and as not sufficiently distinguishing between criticism of Israeli actions and criticism of Zionism as a political ideology, on the one hand, and racially based violence towards, discrimination against, or abuse of, Jews.

Hate crime expert Paul Igansky points out that one of the EUMC antisemitic behaviors, comparisons between Israeli policy and those of the Nazis, is "arguably not intrinsically antisemitic", and that the context in which they are made is critical. Igansky illustrates this with the incident where Israeli prime minister Yitzhak Rabin was described by fellow Jewish Israelis as cooperating with the Nazis, and depicted wearing an SS uniform. According to Igansky, the "Nazi" label was merely used as "charged political rhetoric" in this case.

==== EISCA 2009 report on criticism of Israel ====
Following the 2006 EUMC report, the European Institute for the Study of Contemporary Antisemitism (EISCA) published a report in 2009 entitled Understanding and Addressing the 'Nazi Card' – Intervening Against Antisemitic Discourse which discussed comparisons of Israel with Nazi Germany.

The 2009 report incorporated from the 2006 report the five specific kinds of criticism of Israel that should be considered as antisemitism (see above for a list of the five).

The report does not say all criticism of Israel is antisemitic: "Abhorrence and protest against the policies, practices, and leaders of the Israeli state can be expressed in numerous forceful and trenchant ways, as they could against any other state – none of which would be antisemitic...", and "Drawing attention to the consequent harms in [playing the Nazi card against Israel] should not be intended, or taken, in any way as an attempt to suppress criticism of Israel and its military practices."

Antony Lerman criticized the report, and suggested that it could be used to suppress legitimate criticism of Israel, and suggests that the report's authors do not adequately address that possibility.

=== Objections to characterizing criticism of Israel as antisemitism ===
Some commentators have objected to the characterization of criticisms of Israel as antisemitic, and have often asserted that supporters of Israel equate criticism with antisemitism or excessively blur the distinction between the two. Examples include Michael P. Prior, Noam Chomsky, Norman Finkelstein, Michael Lerner, Antony Lerman, Ralph Nader, Jenny Tonge, Ken Livingstone, and Desmond Tutu. They provide a variety of reasons for their objections, including stifling free expression, promoting antisemitism, diluting genuine antisemitism, and alienating Jews from Judaism or Israel.

==== Vague and indiscriminate ====
Michael Lerner claims that the American Jewish community regularly tries to blur the distinction between legitimate criticism of Israel and antisemitism, and says it is a "slippery slope" to expand the definition of antisemitism to include legitimate criticism of Israel.

Palestine Monitor, a Palestinian advocacy group, is critical of what it characterizes as a modern trend to expand the definition of the term "antisemitic", and states that the new definitions are overly vague and allow for "indiscriminate accusations".

Brian Klug argues that anti-Zionism sometimes is a manifestation of antisemitism, but that "[t]hey are separate" and that to equate them is to incorrectly "conflate the Jewish state with the Jewish people."

Earl Raab, founding director of the Nathan Perlmutter Institute for Jewish Advocacy at Brandeis University writes that "[t]here is a new surge of antisemitism in the world, and much prejudice against Israel is driven by such antisemitism," but argues that charges of antisemitism based on anti-Israel opinions generally lack credibility. He writes that "a grave educational misdirection is imbedded in formulations suggesting that if we somehow get rid of antisemitism, we will get rid of anti-Israelism. This reduces the problems of prejudice against Israel to cartoon proportions." Raab describes prejudice against Israel as a "serious breach of morality and good sense," and argues that it is often a bridge to antisemitism, but distinguishes it from antisemitism as such.

Alexander Cockburn and Jeffrey St. Clair, in the book The Politics of Anti-Semitism, write "Apologists for Israel's repression of Palestinians toss the word 'anti-Semite' at any critic of what Zionism has meant in practice for Palestinians on the receiving end. So some of the essays in this book address the issue of what constitutes genuine anti-Semitism – Jew-hatred – as opposed to disingenuous, specious charges of 'anti-Semitism' hurled at rational appraisals of the state of Israel's political, military, and social conduct."

American journalist Norman Solomon wrote an article on The Guardian in December 2025, arguing that equating Israel with Jewish people worldwide is a political strategy used to discourage criticism of Israeli government policies by framing it as antisemitism. Solomon stated that this conflation has helped justify continued American political and military support for Israel despite hundreds of reports by human rights organisations accusing Israel of perpetrating a genocide in Gaza, and that it marginalises Jewish critics of Israeli policies.

==== Represents Jews as victims ====
Norman Finkelstein and Steven Zipperstein (professor of Jewish Culture and History at Stanford University) suggest that criticism of Israel is sometimes inappropriately considered to be antisemitism due to an inclination to perceive Jews as victims. Zipperstein suggests that the common attitude of seeing Jews as victims is sometimes implicitly transferred to the perception of Israel as a victim; while Finkelstein suggests that the depiction of Israel as a victim (as a "Jew among nations") is a deliberate ploy to stifle criticism of Israel.

==== "Self-hating" Jews ====
Sander Gilman has written, "One of the most recent forms of Jewish self-hatred is the virulent opposition to the existence of the State of Israel." He uses the term not against those who criticize Israel's policy, but against Jews who oppose Israel's existence. Michael Lerner, editor of Tikkun magazine, asserts that the equation of criticism of Israel with antisemitism has resulted in conflict within the Jewish community, and that, in particular, proponents of the equation sometimes attack Jewish critics of Israeli policies as "self-hating Jews". Lerner also claims that the equation of criticism of Israel with antisemitism and the resulting charges of "self hating Jew" has resulted in the alienation of young Jews from their faith.

Antony Lerman believes that many attacks on Jewish critics of Israel are "vitriolic, ad hominem and indiscriminate" and claims that anti-Zionism and antisemitism have been defined too broadly and without reason. Lerman also states that the "redefinition" of antisemitism to include anti-Zionism has caused Jews to attack other Jews, because many Jews are leaders in several anti-Zionist organizations.

Nicholas Saphir, chair of the Board of Trustees of the New Israel Fund in the UK, published an open letter defending non-governmental organizations (NGOs) that operate within Israel to promote civil rights. He said that several organisations such as NGO Monitor, Israel Resource News Agency, WorldNetDaily and the Near and Middle East Policy Review "associate moral and ethical criticism of any activity by Israel or the policies of its Government as being anti-Israel, antisemitic and when conducted by Jews, as evidence of self-hatred."

==== Scare tactics ====
The International Jewish Anti-Zionist Network is also opposed to the use of the antisemitic label to suppress criticism, and objected to the "fear tactics" employed when the antisemitic label was applied to supporters of Israel Apartheid Week, claiming that it was reminiscent of the anti-Communist scare tactics of the 1950s.

Michael Lerner suggests that some United States politicians are reluctant to criticise Israel because they are afraid of being labelled antisemitic. Lerner also states that groups that promote peace in the mid-East are afraid to form coalitions, lest they be discredited by what Lerner terms the "Jewish Establishment".

==== Draws attention away from genuine antisemitism ====
Brian Klug asserts that proponents of New Antisemitism define antisemitism so broadly that they deprive the term "antisemitism" of all meaning. Klug wrote: "... when anti-Semitism is everywhere, it is nowhere. And when every anti-Zionist is an anti-Semite, we no longer know how to recognize the real thing—the concept of anti-Semitism loses its significance."

In the book The Politics of Anti-Semitism, Scott Handleman writes: "Partisans of Israel often make false accusations of anti-Semitism to silence Israel's critics. The 'antisemite' libel is harmful not only because it censors debate about Israel's racism and human rights abuses but because it trivializes the ugly history of Jew-hatred."

==== Excessive accusations of antisemitism may result in backlash ====
Brian Klug argues that excessive claims of antisemitism (leveled at critics of Israel) may backfire and contribute to antisemitism, and he writes "a McCarthyite tendency to see antisemites under every bed, arguably contributes to the climate of hostility toward Jews"

Tony Judt also suggests that Israel's "insistent identification" of criticism of Israel with antisemitism is now the leading source of anti-Jewish sentiment in the world.

Michael Lerner echos those thoughts and suggests that the continued "repression" of criticism of Israel may eventually "explode" in an outburst of genuine antisemitism.

==== Attacking the messenger rather than the message ====
Michael Lerner claims that some supporters of Israel refuse to discuss legitimate criticisms of Israel (such as comparisons with apartheid) and instead attack the people who raise such criticisms, thus deliberately "shifting the discourse to the legitimacy of the messenger and thus avoiding the substance of the criticisms".

==== Exaggerating the equation in order to draw sympathy ====
Alan Dershowitz distinguishes between legitimate criticism of Israel and antisemitism, but he claims that some "enemies of Israel" encourage the equation of the two, because it makes the enemies appear to be victims of false accusations of antisemitism, which the enemies use in an attempt to gain sympathy for their cause.

== Suppression of criticism ==
A number of commentators have debated whether public criticism of Israel is suppressed outside of Israel, particularly within the United States. Stephen Zunes writes that "assaults on critics of Israeli policies have been more successful in limiting open debate, but this gagging censorship effect stems more from ignorance and liberal guilt than from any all-powerful Israel lobby." He goes on to explain that while "some criticism of Israel really is rooted in anti-Semitism," it is his opinion that some members of the Israel lobby cross the line by labeling intellectually honest critics of Israel as antisemitic. Zunes argues that the mainstream and conservative Jewish organizations have "created a climate of intimidation against many who speak out for peace and human rights or who support the Palestinians' right of self-determination." Zunes has been on the receiving end of this criticism himself: "As a result of my opposition to US support for the Israeli government's policies of occupation, colonization and repression, I have been deliberately misquoted, subjected to slander and libel, and falsely accused of being "antisemitic" and "supporting terrorism"; my children have been harassed and my university's administration has been bombarded with calls for my dismissal." In an opinion piece for The Guardian, Jimmy Carter wrote that mainstream American politics does not give equal time to the Palestinian side of the Israeli-Palestinian conflict and that this is due at least in part to AIPAC. George Soros has claimed that there are risks associated with what was in his opinion a suppression of debate:

I do not subscribe to the myths propagated by enemies of Israel and I am not blaming Jews for anti-Semitism. Anti-Semitism predates the birth of Israel. Neither Israel's policies nor the critics of those policies should be held responsible for anti-Semitism. At the same time, I do believe that attitudes toward Israel are influenced by Israel's policies, and attitudes toward the Jewish community are influenced by the pro-Israel lobby's success in suppressing divergent views.

On the other hand, in his book, The Deadliest Lies, Abraham Foxman referred to the notion that the pro-Israel lobby is trying to censor criticism of Israel as a "canard." Foxman writes that the Jewish community is capable of telling the difference between legitimate criticism of Israel "and the demonization, delegitimization, and double standards employed against Israel that is either inherently antisemitic or generates an environment of antisemitism." Jonathan Rosenblum expressed similar thoughts: "Indeed, if there were an Israel lobby, and labeling all criticism of Israel as antisemitic were its tactic, the steady drumbeat of criticism of Israel on elite campuses and in the elite press would be the clearest proof of its inefficacy." Alan Dershowitz wrote that he welcomes "reasoned, contextual and comparative criticism of Israeli policies and actions." If one of the goals of the pro-Israel lobby was to censor criticism of Israel, Dershowitz writes, "it would prove that 'the Lobby' is a lot less powerful than the authors would have us believe."

=== Criticism stifled by accusations of antisemitism ===
Several commentators have asserted that supporters of Israel attempt to stifle legitimate criticism of Israel by unfairly labeling critics as antisemitic.

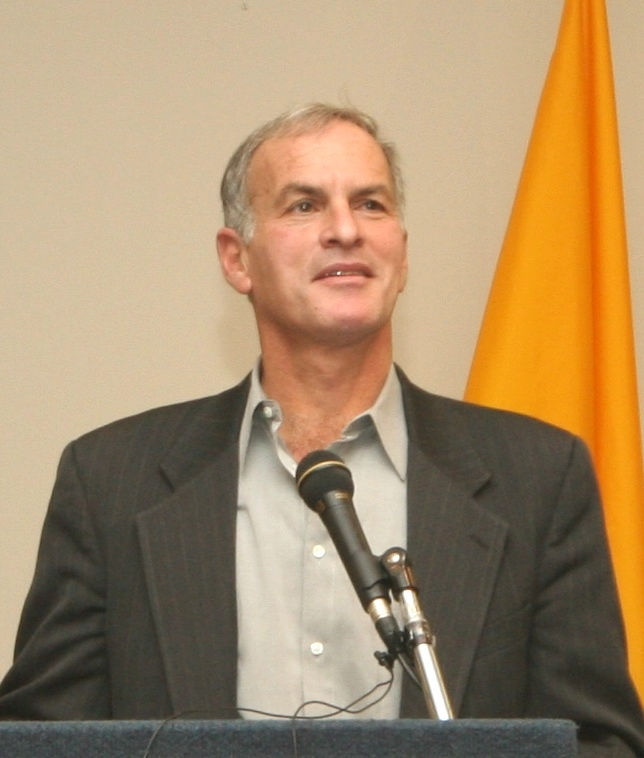
Norman Finkelstein, author of Beyond Chutzpah: On the Misuse of Anti-Semitism and the Abuse of History

One of the major themes of Norman Finkelstein's book Beyond Chutzpah: On the Misuse of Anti-Semitism and the Abuse of History is that some supporters of Israel employ accusations of antisemitism to attack critics of Israel, with the goal of discrediting the critics and silencing the criticism. Professors Judy Rebick and Alan Sears, in response to Israel Apartheid Week activities at Carleton University, wrote an open letter to the university president which claimed that accusations of antisemitism are sometimes made with the goal of "silencing" criticism of Israel.

Journalist Peter Beaumont also claims that some proponents of the concept of New Antisemitism conflate criticism of Israel with antisemitism. Tariq Ali, a British-Pakistani historian and political activist, argues that the concept of new antisemitism amounts to an attempt to subvert the language in the interests of the State of Israel. He writes that the campaign against "the supposed new 'antisemitism'" in modern Europe is a "cynical ploy on the part of the Israeli Government to seal off the Zionist state from any criticism of its regular and consistent brutality against the Palestinians. ... Criticism of Israel cannot and should not be equated with antisemitism." He argues that most pro-Palestinian, anti-Zionist groups that emerged after the Six-Day War were careful to observe the distinction between anti-Zionism and antisemitism.

Jewish Voice for Peace has spoken against what they see as the abuse of the antisemitic label. For example, in an opinion piece, they wrote "For decades, some leaders of the Jewish community have made the preposterous claim that there is complete unity of belief and interest between all Jews and the Israeli government, no matter what its policies. They must believe their own propaganda, because they see no difference between criticism of the Israeli government and antisemitism, and they do everything they can to silence critical voices. If the brand of antisemitism is not sufficiently intimidating, the silencing has been enforced by organized phone and letter-writing campaigns, boycotts, threats of, and actual withdrawal of funding support from 'offending' institutions and individuals."

==== Accusations are public relations efforts ====
John Mearsheimer and Stephen Walt claim that the accusations of antisemitism leveled at critics of Israel are deliberately timed to defuse the impact of the criticisms. They suggest a pattern where accusations of antisemitism rise immediately following aggressive actions by Israel: following the Six-Day War, following the 1982 Lebanon War, and following exposure of "brutal behavior in the Occupied Territories" in 2002.

Norman Finkelstein says that to further a public relations campaign, apologists for Israel make accusations of what they call a "new antisemitism" against those they oppose, and that they do so deliberately in order to undermine critics and bolster the nation's image. Finkelstein also asserts that "American Jewish organizations" purposefully increase vocal accusations of antisemitism during episodes when Israel is coming under increased criticism (such as the during the Intifada), with the goal of discrediting critics of Israel.

==== Critics of Israel who have been accused of antisemitism ====
Critics of Israel who have been accused of antisemitism and have denied the allegation include Ralph Nader, John Mearsheimer, Cindy Sheehan, Jenny Tonge, Ken Livingstone, Desmond Tutu, and Helen Thomas.

Professor J. Lorand Matory is a vocal critic of Israel who supports disinvestment from Israel. Larry Summers, president of Harvard, called efforts by Matory and others to divest from Israel "antisemitic in effect, if not intent." According to Matory, "the knee jerk accusation that targeted criticism of Israel singles out Israel is as absurd as stating that the anti-apartheid movement was singling out South Africa."

Professor Noam Chomsky argues that Israel's foreign minister Abba Eban equated anti-Zionism with antisemitism in an effort to "exploit anti-racist sentiment for political ends", citing statement Eban made in 1973: "One of the chief tasks of any dialogue with the Gentile world is to prove that the distinction between anti-Semitism and anti-Zionism is not a distinction at all." Commenting on Eban's statement, Chomsky replied: "That is a convenient stand. It cuts off a mere 100 percent of critical comment!" In 2002, Chomsky wrote that this equation of anti-Zionism with antisemitism was being extended to criticism of Israeli policies, not just criticism of Zionism. Chomsky also wrote that, when the critics of Israel are Jewish, the accusations of antisemitism involve descriptions of self-hatred. In 2004, Chomsky said "If you identify the country, the people, the culture with the rulers, accept the totalitarian doctrine, then yeah, it's antisemitic to criticize the Israeli policy, and anti-American to criticize the American policy, and it was anti-Soviet when the dissidents criticized Russian policy. You have to accept deeply totalitarian assumptions not to laugh at this." However, Oliver Kamm contends that Chomsky inaccurately interpreted Eban's comments.

Musician Roger Waters is a critic of Israel's treatment of Palestinians and was accused by the ADL of using antisemitic imagery in one of his recent musical productions. Waters responded by stating that the ADL regularly portrays critics of Israel as antisemitic, and that "it is a screen they [the ADL] hide behind".

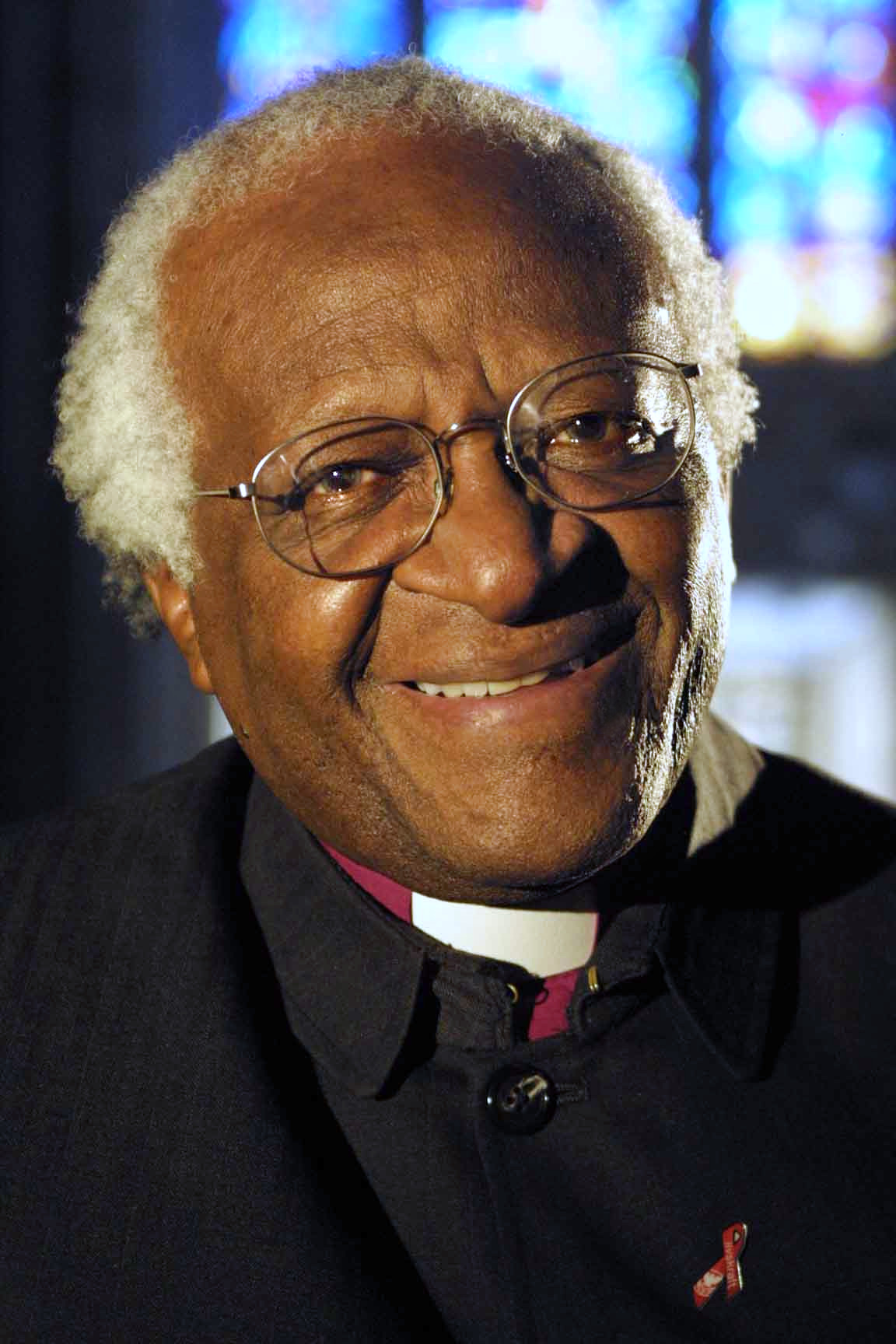
Desmond Tutu

In 2002, Desmond Tutu, a critic of Israel, compared Israel's policies to apartheid-era South Africa. Tutu wrote that criticism of Israel is suppressed in the United States, and that criticisms of Israel are "immediately dubbed antisemitic".

Michael Prior was a vocal critic of Israel's treatment of Palestinians, and who was frequently accused of antisemitism, yet he was careful to distinguish between anti-Zionism and antisemitism.

Ken Livingstone, former mayor of London, was accused of antisemitism for a variety of comments, including remarks criticizing Israel's treatment of Palestinians. In response, Livingstone wrote "For 20 years Israeli governments have attempted to portray anyone who forcefully criticizes the policies of Israel as antisemitic. The truth is the opposite: the same universal human values that recognize the Holocaust as the greatest racist crime of the 20th century require condemnation of the policies of successive Israeli governments – not on the absurd grounds that they are Nazi or equivalent to the Holocaust, but because ethnic cleansing, discrimination and terror are immoral."

Peace activist Cindy Sheehan claimed she has been improperly accused of being antisemitic because of her anti-war position, particularly her criticism of the Israel lobby and Israel's actions towards Palestinians. Sheehan emphasized that her criticism of Israel is "not to be construed as hatred of all Jews".

=== Critics that suggest censorship or suppression ===
Political scientists John Mearsheimer and Stephen Walt wrote an article critical of the Israel lobby in the United States, in which they asserted that the Israel lobby uses accusations of antisemitism as a part of a deliberate strategy to suppress criticism of Israel. Mearsheimer and Walt themselves were accused of antisemitism as a result of that article and the book they wrote based on the article.

Jenny Tonge, member of the UK House of Lords, has frequently criticized Israel's policies, and has been labelled antisemitic. In response, she said during a speech in Parliament: "I'm beginning to understand ... the vindictive actions the Israel lobby [and] AIPAC ... take against people who oppose and criticize the lobby. ... [I understand] ... the constant accusations of antisemitism – when no such sentiment exists – to silence Israel's critics."

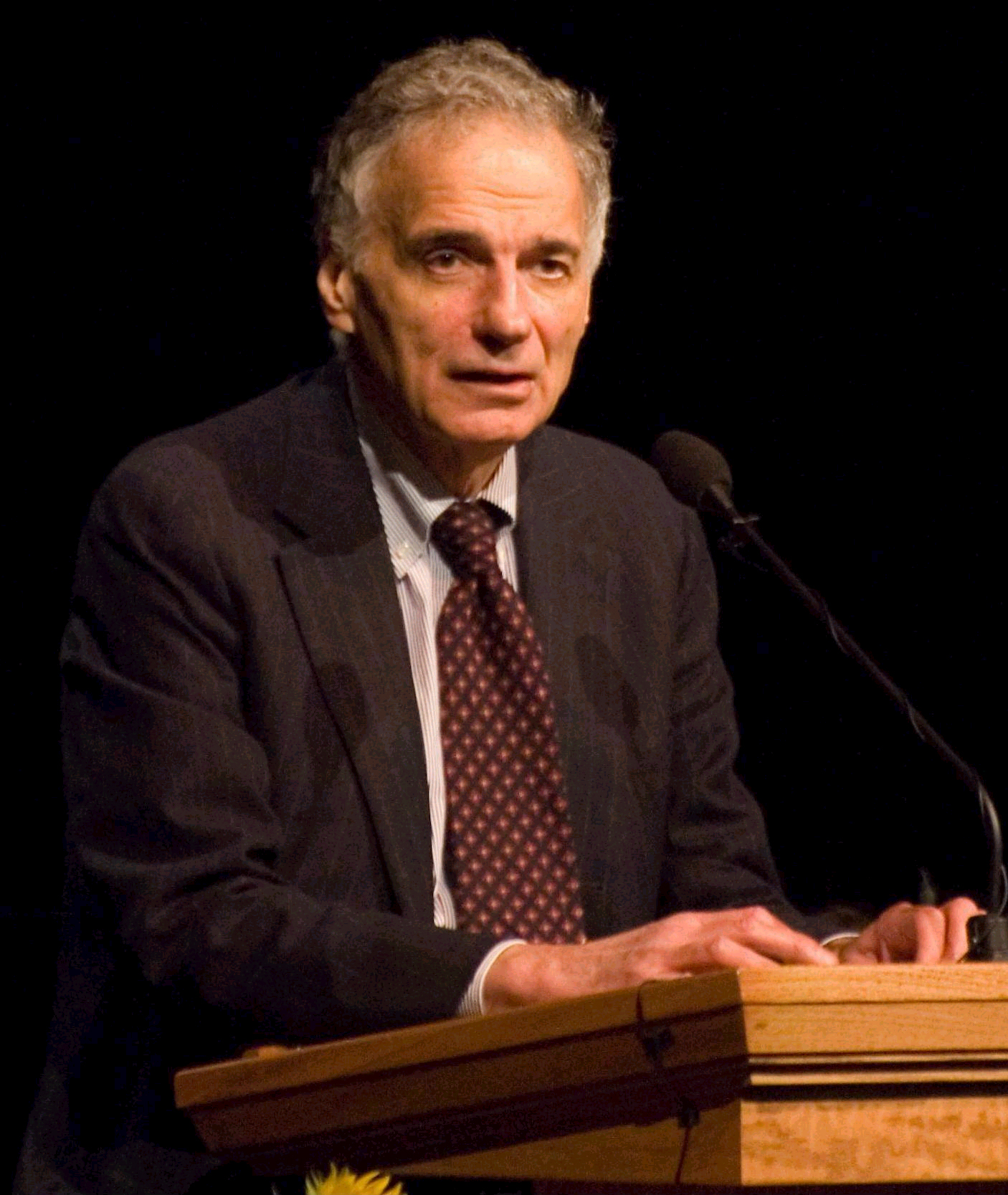
Ralph Nader

Ralph Nader, American politician and consumer advocate, has criticized Israel's policies, expressed support for Palestinian causes, and criticized the excessive influence of the Israel lobby on the U.S. government. He wrote a letter to the director of the Anti-Defamation League entitled "Criticizing Israel is Not Anti-Semitism" in which he said "Your mode of operation for years has been to make charges of racism or insinuation of racism designed to slander and evade. Because your pattern of making such charges, carefully calibrated for the occasion but of the same stigmatizing intent, has served to deter critical freedom of speech. ... The ADL should be working toward this objective [peace] and not trying to suppress realistic discourse on the subject with epithets and innuendos."

William I. Robinson, a professor at UCSB, was accused of being antisemitic due to a class assignment that revolved around Israel's attack on the Gaza strip, and he replied by stating that the Israel lobby labels "any criticism" of Israel as antisemitic In response, Robinson said: "The fact that I did include my interpretation of the Israeli–Palestinian conflict is totally within what is normal and expected. ... One of the most pressing affairs of January was the Israeli assault on Gaza – there was nothing that could be more relevant to this course at that time. When you bring up delicate, sensitive, inflammatory, controversial material in the classroom, we as professors are carrying out our mission to jar students in order to challenge them to think critically about world issues. ... The Israel lobby is possibly the most powerful lobby in the United States, and what they do is label any criticism of anti-Israeli conduct and practices as antisemitic" Robinson said. "This campaign is not just an attempt to punish me. The Israel lobby is stepping up its vicious attacks on anyone who would speak out against Israeli policies."

Steven Salaita, an American expert on comparative literature and post-colonialism, became embroiled in a controversy regarding freedom of speech for faculty at American universities when his offer of employment was withdrawn from UIUC by Chancellor Dr. Phyllis Wise, a move some regard as an infringement on Salaita's freedom of speech. During the 2014 conflict between Israel and Gaza, he had published tweets that were seen as criticism of the Israeli government, and Salaita claims that as a result, pro-Israel advocates associated with the university accused him of antisemitism and pressured the university to rescind its offer of employment to him. As a result of his outspoken critique of the university's handling of his situation, Haaretz notes that Salaita has established "celebrity status on the lecture circuit." In November 2015, Salaita and UIUC reached a settlement which included a payment of $600,000 to Salaita and covering his attorney's costs; the university did not admit any wrongdoing.

== Responses to criticism ==
=== Claims of media bias ===
Mudar Zahran, a Jordanian of Palestinian heritage, writes that the "tendency to blame Israel for everything" has provided Arab leaders an excuse to ignore the human rights of Palestinians in their countries. As an example, he said that while the world was furious over the blockade on Gaza, the media "chose to deliberately ignore" the conditions of the Palestinians living in refugee camps in Lebanon and other Arab countries.

George Will claims that the "blame Israel first (and last, and in between) brigade" is "large and growing".

=== Claims of United Nations bias ===
Alan Dershowitz, an American lawyer, claimed that the United Nations position was hypocritical, writing that the UN never condemned the annexation of Tibet by China or recognized the Tibetans' right to self-determination, also noting that China's occupation of Tibet has been longer, more brutal, deadlier and less justified than Israel's occupation of the West Bank and Gaza.

=== Foreign Ministry ===
The Israeli Ministry of Foreign Affairs has encouraged the use of social media to counteract criticism of Israel's policies. One member of the diplomatic corps proposed more aggressive action regarding Israel's critics. In June 2012, Israel's Channel 10 published an e-mail in which Nurit Tinari-Modai, deputy head of Israel's mission in Ireland and wife of the ambassador, Boaz Moda'i, proposed targeting expatriate Israelis who criticized Israeli policies, posting photos of them and publishing disinformation that would embarrass them. She suggested that criticism of Israel was grounded in psychological reasons, such as sexual identity. Following the publicity about Tinari-Modai's tactics, the Foreign Ministry quickly distanced itself from her letter. Her recommendation included the following: "You have to try and hit their soft underbellies, to publish their photographs, maybe that will cause embarrassment from their friends in Israel and their family, hoping that local activists would understand that they may actually be working on behalf of Mossad."

=== Israeli public opinion ===
International criticism is an important focus within Israel. According to an August 2010 survey by Tel Aviv University, more than half of Israelis believe "the whole world is against us", and three quarters of Israelis believe "that no matter what Israel does or how far it goes towards resolving the conflict with the Palestinians, the world will continue to criticize Israel". As a result, public diplomacy has been an important focus of Israeli governments since Independence. The Israeli Ministry of Public Diplomacy & Diaspora Affairs seeks to explain government policies and promote Israel in the face of what they consider negative press about Israel around the world.

=== Criminalization of Nazi comparisons ===
The EISCA Report recommends that the British government criminalize certain kinds of antisemitism, particularly use of the Nazi analogy to criticize Israel, as well as other forms of criticism of Israel.

=== Boycotts and divestment from Israel ===
Boycotts of Israel are economic and political cultural campaigns or actions that seek a selective or total cutting of ties with the State of Israel. Such campaigns are employed by those who challenge the legitimacy of Israel, Israel's policies or actions towards the Palestinians over the course of the Arab–Israeli and Israeli–Palestinian conflict, oppose Israeli territorial claims in the West Bank or Jerusalem or even oppose Israel's right to exist. Arab boycotts of Zionist institutions and Jewish businesses began before Israel's founding as a state. An official boycott was adopted by the Arab League almost immediately after the formation of the state of Israel in 1948 but is not fully implemented in practice.

Similar boycotts have been proposed outside the Arab world and the Muslim world. These boycotts comprise economic measures such as divestment; a consumer boycott of Israeli products or businesses that operate in Israel; a proposed academic boycott of Israeli universities and scholars; and a proposed boycott of Israeli cultural institutions or Israeli sport venues. Many advocates of the Boycott, Divestment and Sanctions (BDS) campaign, including Archbishop Desmond Tutu use the 1980s movement against South African apartheid as a model.

Disinvestment from Israel is a campaign conducted by religious and political entities which aims to use disinvestment to pressure the government of Israel to put "an end to the Israeli occupation of Palestinian territories captured during the 1967 military campaign." The disinvestment campaign is related to other economic and political boycotts of Israel. A notable campaign was initiated in 2002 and endorsed by South African bishop Desmond Tutu. Tutu said that the campaign against Israel's occupation of the Palestinian territories and its continued settlement expansion should be modeled on the successful, but controversial, disinvestment campaign previously imposed against South Africa's apartheid system.

== Claims of bias and disproportionate attention on Israel ==
In December 2006, Kofi Annan, former UN Secretary-General, accused the Human Rights Council of focusing too heavily on the Arab–Israeli conflict, while allowing it to monopolize attention at the expense of other situations where violations are no less grave or even worse.

Matti Friedman, former AP correspondent in Israel, has analyzed what he perceives as the disproportionate media attention given to the Israeli–Palestinian conflict, compared to other conflicts that are no less violent or even worse.

Tuvia Tenenbom, in his 2015 book Catch the Jew!, argues that many seemingly "human rights" NGOs, EU representatives and Red Cross representatives that act in Israel actually come to implant and inflame the hatred of Israel and Jews among Palestinians, while promoting a one-sided view of the conflict in the world. He also claims that the textbooks in the schools run by the UN, UNRWA (United Nations Relief and Works Agency), and flyers distributed by the Red Cross prompt and encourage antisemitism and teach toward a lack of recognition in the existence of Israel. Ben-Dror Yemini wrote in his book The Industry of Lies that the Arab–Israeli conflict has become the center of a major deception. According to Yemini, lies about Israel in media and academia have been presented as truths; deeply rooted in the global consciousness, this has caused Israel to be seen as a monster, similar to perceptions of Jews in Nazi Germany.

=== United Nations ===
According to Freedom House, the United Nations has a history of negative focus on Israel that is disproportional in respect to other members, including the actions and statements of the United Nations Human Rights Council (UNHRC) and its predecessor, the UN Commission on Human Rights (UNCHR).

Hillel Neuer of UN Watch has described the actions of the UN Commission on Human Rights as a "campaign to demonize Israel". Neuer has stated that an example of bias is that in 2005, the Commission adopted four resolutions against Israel, equaling the combined total of resolutions against all other states in the world. Belarus, Cuba, Myanmar, and North Korea were the subject of one resolution each. In addition, according to UN Watch, in 2004–2005, the UN General Assembly passed nineteen resolutions concerning Israel, while not passing any resolution concerning Sudan, which at the time was facing a genocide in the Darfur region.

In April 2012, the UN released an official statement in which Israel was listed as a country that is restricting the activities of human rights organisations. Israel was included because of a bill approved by the Ministerial Committee on Legislation, which would restrict foreign governmental funding of Israeli non-profit groups. The bill was frozen by the Prime Minister and never reached the Knesset, but the statement said: "In Israel, the recently adopted Foreign Funding Law could have a major impact on human rights organizations".

During his visit in Jerusalem in 2013, UN Secretary-General Ban Ki-moon confirmed that there was a biased attitude towards the Israeli people and Israeli government, stressing that it was "an unfortunate situation". He added that Israel has been criticized and sometimes discriminated against because of the Mideast conflict.

Ron Prosor, Israel's representative to the United Nations, claimed in General Assembly debate on the Question of Palestine, November 2014, that the UN is illogical and tends to lack of sense of justice when it comes to the case of Israel. He claimed that the UN's focus was solely on Israel, ignoring the thousands murdered and expelled in the Middle East under the tyranny of Radical Islam, and that the Arab–Israeli conflict was never about the establishment of a Palestinian state but the existence of the Jewish state. He also claimed that the UN is not for peace or the Palestinian people but simply against Israel, and pointed out that if the UN really cared about the situation of the Palestinians, they would have taken at least one decision regarding the situation of the Palestinians in Syria and Lebanon, where Palestinians are being persecuted and systematically discriminated against.

=== Amnesty International ===
Amnesty International (AI) has been accused by the American Jewish Congress and NGO Monitor of having a double standard with its assessment of Israel. Professor Alan Dershowitz, an American legal scholar and columnist for the Huffington Post, has attacked Amnesty International's perceived bias against Israel, claiming that AI absolves Palestinian men of responsibility for domestic violence and places the blame on Israel instead and that it illegitimately characterizes legal acts of Israeli self-defense as war-crimes.

In 2004, NGO Monitor, a pro-Israel organization, released a study comparing Amnesty International's response to the twenty years of ethnic, religious and racial violence in Sudan – in which (at that time) 2,000,000 people were killed and 4,000,000 people displaced – to their treatment of Israel. When NGO Monitor focused on 2001, they found that Amnesty International issued seven reports on Sudan, as opposed to 39 reports on Israel. Between 2000 and 2003, they claimed the imbalance in issued reports to be 52 reports on Sudan and 192 reports on Israel, which they call "lack of balance and objectivity and apparent political bias [which] is entirely inconsistent with AI's official stated mission." They further called attention to the difference in both scale and intensity: "While ignoring the large-scale and systematic bombing and destruction of Sudanese villages, AI issued numerous condemnations of the razing of Palestinian houses, most of which were used as sniper nests or belonged to terrorists. Although failing to decry the slaughter of thousands of civilians by Sudanese government and allied troops, AI managed to criticize Israel's 'assassinations' of active terrorist leaders."

== See also ==
- Anti-Zionism
- Attacks on refugee camps in the Gaza war
- Children in the Israeli–Palestinian conflict
- Criticism of Hamas
- Criticism of Islamism
- Gaza humanitarian crisis (2023–present)
- Gaza Strip famine
- Gaza war protests
- Human rights violations against Palestinians by Israel
- Israeli criticism of the occupation of Palestine
- Israeli demolition of Palestinian property
- Israeli torture in the occupied territories
- Killing of journalists in the Israel-Hamas war
- Religious relations in Israel
- Torture during the Gaza war
- Zionist political violence
- List of pro‑Palestinian advocacy organizations
