= CounterPunch =

Bi-monthly left-wing online magazine based in Petrolia, California

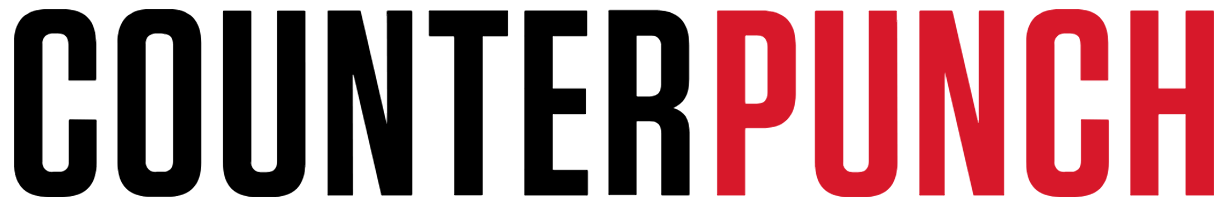
- Editors: Jeffrey St. Clair; Joshua Frank
- Former editors: Ken Silverstein; Alexander Cockburn
- Staff writers: Frank Bardacke; Daniel Burton-Rose; Andrew Cockburn; Laura Flanders; Annys Shinn; Ken Silverstein; JoAnn Wypijewski
- Categories: Politics
- First issue: 1994; 32 years ago
- Country: United States
- Based in: Petrolia, California, United States
- Language: English
- Website: www.counterpunch.org
- ISSN: 1086-2323

CounterPunch is a left-wing online magazine. Content includes a free section published five days a week, as well as a subscriber-only area called CounterPunch+, where original articles are published weekly. CounterPunch is based in the United States and covers politics in a manner its editors describe as "muckraking with a radical attitude".

From 1993 to 2020, CounterPunch published a newsletter, and a magazine.

== History ==
CounterPunch began as a newsletter, established in 1994 by the Washington, D.C.–based investigative reporter Ken Silverstein. Silverstein was soon joined by Alexander Cockburn and then Jeffrey St. Clair, who became the publication's editors in 1996 when Silverstein left.

In 2007, Cockburn and St. Clair wrote that in founding CounterPunch they had "wanted it to be the best muckraking newsletter in the country", and cited as inspiration such pamphleteers as Edward Abbey, Peter Maurin, and Ammon Hennacy, as well as the socialist/populist newspaper Appeal to Reason (1895–1922). When Cockburn died in 2012, St. Clair became editor-in-chief and environmental journalist Joshua Frank became managing editor.

== Reception ==
In 2003, The Observer described the CounterPunch website as "one of the most popular political sources in America, with a keen following in Washington". Other sources have variously described CounterPunch as "left-wing", "far-left", "extreme", a "political newsletter", and a "muckraking newsletter".

== Controversies ==
Scholarship on antisemitism on the left has criticized CounterPunch for publishing articles written by white nationalists and Holocaust deniers such as Israel Shamir, Paul Craig Roberts, and Gilad Atzmon in the 2000s. CounterPunch itself was not accused of publishing Holocaust denial.

In 2016, CounterPunch appeared in a PropOrNot list of websites in which it was described as a Russian propaganda outlet. Writing in The New Yorker magazine, Adrian Chen described the list as a mess and CounterPunch as a "respected left-leaning" publication.

In June 2026, CounterPunch republished an article critical of the US-Iran war which was penned by a fictitious ChatGPT-generated persona as part of an Iranian influence operation. Various media outlets were impacted, including the progressive site Common Dreams, Middle East Monitor and others. After removing the offending posts, CounterPunch editors Jeffrey St. Clair and Joshua Frank wrote that the articles they published were all submitted via a reputable syndication service called PeaceVoice.

=== The "Alice Donovan affair" ===
During the 2016 presidential election, CounterPunch published a piece attributed to Alice Donovan, who purported to be a freelance writer but who US intelligence officials alleged to be a pseudonymous employee of the Russian government. Donovan was tracked by the FBI for nine months, as a suspected fictitious persona created by the GRU. In late November 2017, after CounterPunch had published several more pieces by Donovan, The Washington Post contacted Jeffrey St. Clair about her. The co-editor said that Donovan's pitches did not stand out among the pitches that CounterPunch received daily and began making inquiries. St. Clair asked Donovan to substantiate her identity by sending a photo of her driver’s license but she did not.

On the same day The Washington Post article about Donovan was published, St. Clair and Frank published a piece stating that CounterPunch only ran one article by Alice Donovan during the 2016 election, which was on cyber-breaches of medical databases. Donovan was also exposed by the newsletter as a serial plagiarizer. CounterPunch removed all of the articles from their site.

In a January 2018 follow-up article, St. Clair and Frank exposed a network of alleged trolls that operated a site called Inside Syria Media Center, promoting a pro-Bashar al-Assad and pro-Russian view of the Syrian Civil War. St. Clair and Frank speculated that the website was connected to the same network of trolls as Alice Donovan, which was later confirmed by the Atlantic Council and other researchers.

On 8 June 2016, "Alice Donovan" and other Russian-controlled fake American personas began promoting the DCLeaks website on Facebook.
