= Israeli criticism of the occupation of Palestine =

Some Israelis (both Jews and non-Jews) have been critical of the occupation and settlement of the West Bank and the Gaza Strip since 1967.

== Overview ==
Jewish opposition to Zionism has a long history, and many Israeli scholars and critics have been harsh in their judgements of the way their state has carried out its settlement and control policies in the Palestinian territories. Many Israeli organizations such as B'Tselem, Yesh Din, Ta'ayush, Rabbis for Human Rights, Gush Shalom, and Machsom Watch are active in the West Bank and both assist and document the plight of Palestinians under occupation. Former soldiers with direct experience of the realities of the occupation also provide extensive critical witness.

At the very beginning of the Occupation the Orthodox Jewish philosopher Yeshayahu Leibowitz thought the occupation of the West Bank and Gaza would imperil Judaism itself, (Note: For the theological concern underwriting Leibowitz's attitude see Rechnitzer.) and advocated immediate withdrawal. As the years passed, his antagonism to Israel's military successes led him to speak of "Judeo-Nazis" and the "Nazification of Israeli society", a position which did not stop him being nominated for the Israel Prize in 1993 by the government of Yitzhak Rabin. Israeli demographer Oren Yiftachel considers not only the settlement policy in the West Bank, but the state of Israel itself as an example of a Judaizing ethnocratic regime, which he defines as one that "promote(s) the expansion of the dominant group in contested territory and its domination of power structures while maintaining a democratic façade." The activist Jeff Halper speaks of a "matrix of control" underlying the occupation, (Note: "the matrix of control...is an interlocking series of mechanisms, only a few of which require physical occupation of territory, that allow Israel to control every aspect of Palestinian life in the Occupied Territories. The matrix works like the Japanese game of Go. Instead of defeating your opponent as in chess, in Go you win by immobilizing your opponent, by gaining control of key points of a matrix so that every time s/he moves, s/he encounters an obstacle of some kind.") while the Israeli philosopher Avishai Margalit, following the Indologist David Dean Shulman, speaks of its "intricate machinery". (Note: "Over a period of more than sixty years, beginning in fact many decades before our starting point of 1978, and before even the occupation of 1967, Israel has created for the Palestinian people a unique and exquisitely refined system of exclusion, expropriation, confinement, and denial. Above all, this system is buttressed by a robust denial that any of this is happening or has ever happened. In some ways this denial is the worst party of the system, constituting a form of collective psychological torture.") Neve Gordon analyses at length the attempts to so normalize things that an "invisible occupation" is created.

For Baruch Kimmerling, the process of Israeli policies constituted what he called politicide, "the dissolution of the Palestinian people's existence as a legitimate social, political and economic entity" Yoav Peled has described Israel and its occupational policies as constituting a Neoliberal Warfare State. Zeev Sternhell has argued that the West Bank for the radical right is the touchstone of Zionism, serving as a staging post or territorial basis from which to challenge the secular state of Israel and what they perceive to be its Hellenization on the other side of the Green Line. Uri Avnery, critical of what he saw as the militarization of Israeli society, (Note: "The centrality of security, the extensive human capital and social capital invested in the military, and the country's institutional interests created in Israel a social structure different from that of democracies living in peace. Though the democratic nature of Israeli society has been preserved and the military continues to subscribe to democratic values, Israel exists as a nation in arms, and, therefore, lacks integral boundaries between its military and society. This has inevitably led to the militarization of certain societal spheres and the politicization of the military in other spheres.") insisted to his dying day on "looking up" optimistically, for, "If we keep on looking down, at our feet, we will die from sorrow." Avraham Burg (Note: "the Israel government system – democratic – is based on rights, but our relations with the Palestinians are based on variations of force, without a shred of recognition of their natural and inalienable rights, as indivioduals and as a collective. In the gap between the Israel rights and the Israel of domination lie many of the evils of our reality".) in reply to a Haaretz journalist who quipped that Burg's views were an existential threat to the state of Israel, remarked

Tell me something. How can it be that I have been a Jew for two thousand years, without a gun, without planes, without two hundred atomic bombs, and I never for a day feared for the existence and eternity of the Jewish people? And you – the Israeli – you've been armed to the teeth for sixty years, with troops and special forces, with capabilities the Jewish people never had, never had, and every day you are scared, perpetually terrified that this day is your last.

Ronit Lentin, following Shlomo Swirsky, suggests that a central function of settlement is psychological, a means of overcoming a "self-perceived Israeli-Jewish victimhood" complex. (Note: "Avowedly established by the Zionist movement with the support of the international community in the wake of the Nazi genocide as a haven for racialized and oppressed Jews, Israel legitimizes its existence as a Jewish state by exploiting historical and present-day Jewish victimhood and at the same time denying its own racism, which it cloaks under the self-defense mantle.") This position is similar to that espoused by the philosopher of science and Auschwitz survivor Yehuda Elkana (Note: "Lately I have become more and more convinced that the deepest political and social factor that motivates much of Israeli society in its relations with the Palestinians is not personal frustration, but rather a profound existential Angst fed by a particular interpretation of the lessons of the Holocaust and the readiness to believe that the whole world is against us, and that we are the eternal victim. In this ancient belief, shared by so many today, I see the tragic and paradoxical victory of Hitler.") (Note: "The beliefs in the victimization of one's own side resembles a deeply rooted understanding of the Jewish people as eternal victims of persecution, trauma and instrumentalization during the Holocaust, as well as siege mentality. In the context of this collective memory and trauma, international criticism must seem unfair and unjustified, especially if the 'world' is perceived as having lost moral grounds to criticize Israel. A central part of this conviction is convincing the international community of one's own victim position. However, when this status is not granted, this attitude leads to resentment.") and has support from empirical studies of Israeli media portrayals of the conflict, which highlight incidents of violence, and play into historic anxieties, such as those drawing on the collective memories of existential threats and the Holocaust to produce a "siege mentality" productive of the same distrust that Palestinians nurture from the sense of victimhood as an occupied people.

== Sources ==
- Alexander, Edward (2003). Classical Liberalism and the Jewish Tradition. Transaction Publishers. ISBN 978-1-412-81975-6.
- Bar-Tal, Daniel; Alon, Ilai (2017). "Sociopsychological approach to Trust (or Distrust): Concluding Comments". In Bar-Tal, Daniel (ed.). The Role of Trust in Conflict Resolution: The Israeli-Palestinian Case and Beyond. Springer. pp. 311–333. ISBN 978-3-319-43355-4.
- Burg, Avraham (2018). In Days to Come: A New Hope for Israel. Hachette UK. ISBN 978-1-568-58979-4.
- Elkana, Yehuda (2 March 1988). "The Need to Forget" (PDF). Haaretz. Archived from the original (PDF) on 19 February 2023.
- Gordon, Neve (2008). Israel's Occupation. University of California Press. ISBN 978-0-520-94236-3.
- Halper, Jeff (2006). "The 94 Percent Solution: Israel's Matrix of Control". In Beinin, Joel; Stein, Rebecca L. (eds.). The Struggle for Sovereignty: Palestine and Israel, 1993-2005. Stanford University Press. pp. 62–73. ISBN 978-0-804-75365-4.
- Isaac, Rami (2013). "Palestine: Tourism Under Occupation". In Butler, Richard; Suntikul, Wantanee (eds.). Tourism and War. Routledge. pp. 143–158. ISBN 978-1-136-26309-5.
- Khalidi, Rashid (2013). Brokers of Deceit: How the U.S. Has Undermined Peace in the Middle East. Beacon Press. ISBN 978-0-807-04476-6.
- Kimmerling, Baruch (2003). Politicide: Ariel Sharon's War Against the Palestinians. Verso Books. p. 16. ISBN 978-1-859-84517-2.
- Lentin, Ronit (2018). Traces of Racial Exception: Racializing Israeli Settler Colonialism. Bloomsbury Publishing. ISBN 978-1-350-03205-7.
- Lewin, Eyal (2013). Ethos Clash in Israeli Society. Lexington Books. ISBN 978-0-739-18407-3.
- Margalit, Avishai (6 December 2007). "A Moral Witness to the 'Intricate Machine': Dark Hope: Working for Peace in Israel and Palestine". The New York Times. Vol. 54, no. 19. pp. 38–42.
- Mendel, Yonatan (13 September 2018). "Short Cuts". London Review of Books. Vol. 40, no. 17. p. 17.
- Müller, Margret (2017). The World According To Israeli Newspapers: Representations of International Involvement in the Israeli-Palestinian Conflict. Frank & Timme. ISBN 978-3-732-90286-6.
- Peled, Yoav (2006). "From Zionism to Capitalism: The Political Economy of the Neoliberal Warfare State". In Beinin, Joel; Stein, Rebecca L. (eds.). The Struggle for Sovereignty: Palestine and Israel, 1993-2005. Stanford University Press. pp. 38–53. ISBN 9780804753654.
- Peri, Yoram (2006). Generals in the Cabinet Room: How the Military Shapes Israeli Policy. United States Institute of Peace Press. ISBN 978-1-929-22381-7.
- Rechnitzer, Haim O. (Fall 2008). "Redemptive Theology in the Thought of Yeshayahu Leibowitz". Israel Studies. 13 (3): 137–159. doi:10.2979/ISR.2008.13.3.137. JSTOR 30245835. S2CID 145216120.
- Sternhell, Zeev (2009). The Founding Myths of Israel: Nationalism, Socialism, and the Making of the Jewish State. Princeton University Press. ISBN 978-1-400-82236-2.
- Sufrin, Claire E. (2013). "Beyond the Chasm: Religion and Literature After the Holocaust". In Koltun-Fromm, Ken (ed.). Thinking Jewish Culture in America. Lexington Books. pp. 131–155. ISBN 978-0-739-17447-0.
- Yiftachel, Oren (2006). Ethnocracy: Land and Identity Politics in Israel/Palestine. University of Pennsylvania Press. ISBN 978-0-812-23927-0.
