= Michael Prior =

Michael Prior may refer to:

- Michael Prior (footballer), Australian rules footballer
- Michael Prior (theologian), professor of biblical theology
- Mike Prior, American football player

== See also ==
- Michael Pryor, Australian writer
