= The Politics of Anti-Semitism =

2003 book by Alexander Cockburn and Jeffrey St. Clair

- Author: Alexander Cockburn; Jeffrey St. Clair; Michael Neumann; Lenni Brenner; Uri Avnery; Robert Fisk; Norman Finkelstein; Edward Said
- Subject: Antisemitism
- Publisher: CounterPunch, AK Press
- Publication date: October 10, 2003
- Pages: 178
- ISBN: 978-1-902-59377-7
- OCLC: 53402015

The Politics of Anti-Semitism is a book edited by Alexander Cockburn and Jeffrey St. Clair and published by AK Press in 2003.

Contributors include former U.S. Representative and conspiracy theorist Cynthia McKinney, British foreign correspondent Robert Fisk, former senior CIA analysts Bill and Kathy Christison, professor of philosophy Michael Neumann, Capitol Hill staffer George Sutherland, assistant professor of political science and author Norman Finkelstein, Israeli Uri Avnery, Singaporean Shaheed Alam, and Israeli journalists Neve Gordon and Yigal Bronner as well as Will Yeoman, Kurt Nimmo and Anne Pettifer.

The book was created in order to claim that criticism of Israel is not necessarily antisemitic, and not related to the religion itself, but to the country. Reviewing the collection, Paul de Rooij notes that "perhaps the greatest value of this book" is its variety of perspectives on "knowing what issues are sensitive, and why."

One essay, by one of the book's editors, Alexander Cockburn, "My Life As an 'Antisemite,'" was written in response to the "accusation of antisemitism" by Harvard law professor Alan Dershowitz. Dershowitz characterizes Cockburn's claims in the essay as ad hominem attacks against Joan Peters, author of the book From Time Immemorial.
