= Joshua Frank =

American journalist

Joshua Frank (born in Billings, Montana) is an American investigative journalist, author and editor living in the United States and covers current political and environmental topics. His work has been honored by the Society of Professional Journalists. Along with Jeffrey St. Clair, he is the editor of the alternative political magazine and website CounterPunch. His articles have appeared in Seattle Weekly, The Intercept and regularly at CounterPunch and The Nation. Frank's journalism has been supported by The Nation Institute's Type Investigations.

Frank graduated from Billings West High School in 1997 and holds a graduate degree in environmental conservation from New York University.

== Books ==
- Left Out!: How Liberals Helped Reelect George W. Bush (2005) ISBN 1-56751-310-7
- Red State Rebels: Tales of Grassroots Resistance in the Heartland (2008) (co-edited with Jeffrey St. Clair) ISBN 978-1560251538
- Hopeless: Barack Obama and the Politics of Illusion (2013) (co-edited with Jeffrey St. Clair) ISBN 978-1849351102
- The Big Heat: Earth on the Brink (2018) (written with Jeffrey St. Clair) ISBN 978-1849353366
- Atomic Days: The Untold Story of the Most Toxic Place in America (2022) ISBN 978-1642598285
- Bad Energy: The AI Hucksters, Rogue Lithium Extractors, and Wind Industrialists Who Are Selling Off Our Future (2026) ISBN 979-8888906071
