= Stephen Pollard =

English journalist (born 1964)

- Born: 18 December 1964 (age 61); London, England
- Education: John Lyon School; Mansfield College, Oxford.
- Occupation: Journalist

Stephen Pollard (born 18 December 1964) is an English author and journalist. From 2008 until December 2021, he was the editor of The Jewish Chronicle and remains a senior advisor and writer on the paper.

== Early life ==
Pollard had what he calls a "normal, nominally orthodox north-west London Jewish upbringing". His childhood dream was to become a barrister. He attended Mansfield College, Oxford.

== Career ==
In the early part of his career, Pollard was associated with the British Labour Party as a researcher for MP Peter Shore and through working for the Fabian Society in 1993.

=== Think tanks ===
In 1996, Pollard joined the Social Market Foundation.

In 2005, Pollard was a Senior Fellow at Civitas. In 2007, he was president for the Centre for the New Europe.

In 2007, he became the first chair of the European Institute for the Study of Contemporary Antisemitism.

=== Journalism ===
Stephen Pollard started at the Evening Standard. He then worked at the Daily Express, leaving in 2001. In his final article for the paper, he used the first letter of every paragraph to spell out the phrase "Fuck you Desmond".

He has been a political columnist with The Times and the Daily Mail as well as writing for The Independent and The Sunday Telegraph.

In November 2008, he became editor of The Jewish Chronicle. As editor, he referred to the paper as "Israel's candid friend."

In September 2010, Stephen Pollard and The Spectator apologised and paid damages and costs to the organisers of the Islam Expo conference, in a defamation case involving a blog post written by Pollard and published in July 2008. The apology regretted the suggestion that "Islam Expo Limited is a fascist party dedicated to genocide which organised a conference with a racist and genocidal programme" and accepted that "Islam Expo's purpose is to provide a neutral and broad-based platform for debate on issues relating to Muslims and Islam."

During his editorship, as of October 2020, the Press Complaints Commission and its successor IPSO made fourteen rulings against the paper.

It was announced in April 2020 that the paper was going into voluntary liquidation, despite a planned merger with Jewish News, announced in February 2020. Pollard resigned to join a consortium bidding for the publication's assets. The bid was successful and Pollard was appointed editor at large.

As of 2023, he wrote frequently for the Daily Express, and also writes for the Daily Mail, The Sun and The Daily Telegraph. In January 2025, he stepped down from his position at the Jewish Chronicle to concentrate on writing a history of Jewish migration and pursue other projects. He will continue to write a regular column for the paper. As of 2025, he wrote most frequently for The Spectator, The Jewish Chronicle and The Telegraph, and he was a columnist for The Critic magazine.

== Views ==
Pollard is an advocate of market-based public service reforms. He believes that "the state has no business running schools or hospitals" and "I object to the fact I have to pay for [the BBC]". He has advocated the introduction of medical co-payments for the National Health Service and the introduction of a flat tax. He expressed support for Chancellor George Osborne's decision to limit child benefits, writing that "welfare is thought of as an entitlement, so that those who choose not to work to support themselves can rely on the rest of us to pay their way." He has praised Rupert Murdoch as "a man who has done more to democratise news, sport and leisure than any of his opponents."

Pollard supported Brexit and praised the Conservative Party's 2019 manifesto.

Pollard was a signatory founder of the Henry Jackson Society, a neoconservative British foreign policy think tank.

Pollard says that he began to think about Judaism seriously and to feel loyalty to Israel in his mid-thirties. Pollard has called Amnesty International a "woke joke" and accused them of allying with "groups that lionise Islamist terrorists." He has also written that "Amnesty is a worthless, morally bankrupt sham that gives succour to terrorist states."

Pollard supported the 2003 invasion of Iraq, while acknowledging failures in reconstruction, and called the Stop the War Coalition "traitors", saying that their opposition to the invasions of Iraq and Afghanistan equated to supporting dictators.

== Publications ==
- David Blunkett, Hodder & Stoughton, 2004
- Ten Days That Changed The Nation: The Making Of Modern Britain, Simon & Schuster, 2009
- Falling Off A Clef: The Lives and Bizarre Deaths of Great Composers, The Robson Press, 2014

Media offices
Preceded by Jeff Barak	Editor of The Jewish Chronicle; 2008–2021	Succeeded by Jake Wallis Simons
