= European Institute for the Study of Contemporary Antisemitism =

The European Institute for the Study of Contemporary Antisemitism (EISCA) was established in 2007 as a think-tank to examine the growth and development of antisemitism in the world today and to explore new strategies for countering it in all its forms. Its website was last updated in mid 2011.

== Founding personnel ==
Its first chair was announced to be Stephen Pollard. Its board comprised Jeremy Newmark, chief executive of the Jewish Leadership Council, Mark Gardner, director of communications at the Community Security Trust, and Jon Benjamin, chief executive of the Board of Deputies of British Jews. Chair of its advisory board was Rabbi Dr Sidney Brichto, acting director of the Israel-Diaspora Trust. Its part-time director was Dr Winston Pickett, communications consultant to the Board of Deputies and former media consultant to the Institute for Jewish Policy Research.

== 2009 Report on Anti-Semitism ==
The European Institute for the Study of Contemporary Antisemitism (EISCA) published a report in 2009 entitled Understanding and Addressing the ‘Nazi Card' - Intervening Against Antisemitic Discourse which discussed comparisons of Israel with Nazi Germany.

The 2009 report incorporated from the 2006 report the five specific kinds of criticism of Israel that the authors believed should be considered as anti-Semitism:

1. Denying the Jewish people their right to self-determination, e.g., by claiming that the existence of a State of Israel is a racist endeavour.
2. Applying double standards by requiring of it a behaviour not expected or demanded of any other democratic nation.
3. Using the symbols and images associated with classic antisemitism (e.g., claims of Jews killing Jesus or blood libel) to characterise Israel or Israelis.
4. Drawing comparisons of contemporary Israeli policy to that of the Nazis.
5. Holding Jews collectively responsible for actions of the state of Israel.

The report does not say all criticism of Israel is anti-Semitic: "Abhorrence and protest against the policies, practices, and leaders of the Israeli state can be expressed in numerous forceful and trenchant ways, as they could against any other state - none of which would be antisemitic…" and "Drawing attention to the consequent harms in [playing the Nazi card against Israel] should not be intended, or taken, in any way as an attempt to suppress criticism of Israel and its military practices"

Antony Lerman criticized the report, and suggested that it could be used to suppress legitimate criticism of Israel, and suggests that the report's authors do not adequately address that possibility.
