= Adrian Chen =

American journalist

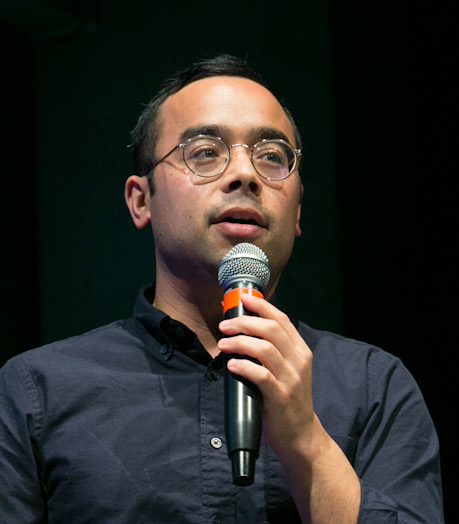
- Adrian Chen at The Influencers in 2017
- Born: November 23, 1984 (age 41); New York City, U.S.
- Occupation: Blogger

Adrian Chen (Note: traditional Chinese: 陳力宇; simplified Chinese: 陈力宇; pinyin: Chén Lìyǔ) (born November 23, 1984) is an American blogger and former staff writer at The New Yorker. Chen joined Gawker in November 2009 as a night shift editor, graduating from an internship position at Slate, and has written extensively on Internet culture, especially virtual communities such as 4chan and Reddit. Chen is the creator of The Pamphlette, a "humor publication" for Reed College students on a piece of letter-size paper. He has written for The New York Times, New York magazine, Wired, and other publications.

In October 2012, Chen exposed the real name and details of Violentacrez (a moderator of several controversial Reddit communities) as a Texas Internet developer, who was subsequently fired from his job. This led to all links to Gawker being temporarily banned from Reddit. In September 2012, Chen acquiesced to demands from Anonymous and posted images of himself dressed in a tutu with a shoe perched on his head. The images had been demanded in exchange for interviews regarding an alleged leak of Apple iPhone and iPad user data from an FBI laptop.

In 2016, he became a staff writer for The New Yorker. He left the magazine in July 2018.

== Personal background ==
Chen was born to Harry Chen and Anne Lezak. His father Harry is ethnic Chinese and religiously Christian and his mother Anne is Jewish. His maternal grandfather was Sidney I. Lezak, former U.S. Attorney for Oregon for more than 20 years.

== Investigative reporting ==
=== Silk Road ===
In June 2011, Chen wrote an exposé of Silk Road, a darknet market which facilitated online drug purchases. Following publication of the article, Chen was interviewed about Silk Road on NPR's All Things Considered. As a result of Chen's investigation, United States Senators Charles Schumer and Joe Manchin publicly called on U.S. Attorney General Eric Holder to shut the site down.

=== Facebook ===
In February 2012, Chen interviewed a content moderator from oDesk, an outsourcing firm hired to enforce Facebook's content guidelines. The article included the guidelines provided by oDesk.

=== Reddit ===
In October 2012, Chen uncovered the background of Michael Brutsch, a moderator who oversaw several controversial Reddit forums such as r/creepshots and r/jailbait, under the username 'Violentacrez'. He arranged a phone interview with Brutsch during which Brutsch mentioned he had a disabled wife and pleaded for him to keep his identity secret. Though Chen claimed this "did shake [him] a bit", he published an article revealing his name, location, and workplace on Gawker. The next day, Brutsch was fired from his job. This release of personally identifiable information prompted several subreddits to ban all Gawker link submissions from their site. When Chen's article was published it became banned site-wide, which Reddit general manager Erik Martin said was a mistake. "The sitewide ban of the recent Adrien Chen [sic] article was a mistake on our part and was fixed this morning. Mods are still free to do what they want in their subreddits". Chen claims that apart from Reddit, response to his story had been "overwhelmingly positive", telling The Guardian, "I thought there would be more of a backlash about the story, but people really are willing to accept that anonymity is not a given on the internet and if people use pseudonyms to publish sexualised images of women without their consent, and of underage girls, then there's not really a legitimate claim to privacy". For his article revealing Brutsch, Chen received a Mirror Award for Best Profile in the category of Traditional/Legacy or Digital Media.

The public outpouring of hostility towards Brutsch following the exposé prompted commentators such as danah boyd at Wired and Michelle Star of CNET to question the morality of outing as a way to enforce societal standards online. Several commentators have expressed concern that the public shaming of Brutsch may serve as an example to others, legitimizing online vigilantism and exposing individuals such as Brutsch to mass retribution. Mez Breeze has suggested in The Next Web that, in outing Brutsch, Chen engaged in a type of trolling, making Brutsch "the victim of unwanted bullying and substantial negative attention" as a result of the exposé.

Reddit users accused Chen of doxing Brutsch and declared "war" on Gawker.

=== PropOrNot ===
PropOrNot is a group that seeks to expose what it calls Russian propaganda and published a list of websites they called "bona-fide 'useful idiots'" of the Russian government based on methodology they called "a combination of manual and automated analysis, including analysis of content, timing, technical indicators, and other reporting". Chen was critical of The Washington Post's decision to put the story on its front page. He wrote in an article titled "The Propaganda About Russian Propaganda": "The story topped the Post's most-read list, and was shared widely by prominent journalists and politicians on Twitter. ... But a close look at the report showed that it was a mess." Looking more carefully into their methodology, Chen argued that PropOrNot's criteria for establishing propaganda were so broad that they could have included "not only Russian state-controlled media organizations, such as Russia Today, but nearly every news outlet in the world, including the Post itself" on their list.

== Bibliography ==
- "Can an Algorithm Solve Twitter's Credibility Problem?". Annals of Technology [web only]. The New Yorker. May 5, 2014.
- "Unfollow: How a Prized Daughter of the Westboro Baptist Church Came to Question Its Beliefs". Dept. of Technology. The New Yorker. 91 (37): 80–86, 88–93. November 23, 2015.
- "The Propaganda About Russian Propaganda". News Desk [web only]. The New Yorker. December 1, 2016.
- "The Troll of Internet Art". Profiles. The New Yorker. 92 (47): 30–35. January 30, 2017.

== See also ==
- Chinese Americans in New York City
- Dark web
- Investigative journalism
- New Yorkers in journalism
