= Jeffrey St. Clair =

American journalist

- Born: 1959 (age 66–67); Indianapolis, Indiana, U.S.
- Education: American University (B.A.)
- Occupation: Journalist

Jeffrey St. Clair (born 1959 in Indianapolis, Indiana) is an American investigative journalist, writer, and editor. He has been a co editor of CounterPunch since 1999.

== Biography ==
St Clair was born in Indianapolis, Indiana and attended American University in Washington, D.C., majoring in English and history. In the late 1970s he protested construction of the Marble Hill Nuclear Power Plant. He has worked as an environmental organizer and writer for Friends of the Earth, Clean Water Action, and the Hoosier Environmental Council.

In 1990, he moved to Oregon to edit the environmental magazine Forest Watch. In 1994, he joined journalists Alexander Cockburn and Ken Silverstein on CounterPunch and has contributed as an author since. He co-edited CounterPunch from 1999 to 2012 with Cockburn until the latter's death in 2012. St. Clair has served as an editor since 2012, joined by managing editor Joshua Frank in 2012.

St. Clair is a former contributing editor to the monthly magazine In These Times. He has also written for The Progressive.

In 1998, he published his first book, with Cockburn, Whiteout: the CIA, Drugs and the Press, a history of the CIA's alleged ties to drug gangs from World War II to the Mujahideen and Nicaraguan Contras. This was followed by A Field Guide to Environmental Bad Guys (with James Ridgeway), and with Cockburn, Five Days that Shook the World: Seattle and Beyond, and Al Gore: a User's Manual.

St. Clair co-authored a weekly syndicated column with Alexander Cockburn called "Nature and Politics." The 65 articles were published 2003 in Been Brown So Long It Looked Like Green to Me: the Politics of Nature. It has been called a virtual handbook for radical environmentalists.

Grand Theft Pentagon, and Born Under a Bad Sky: Notes from the Dark Side of the Earth. His book, Bernie and the Sandernistas: Field Notes from a Failed Revolution, was published in late-2016.

As of 2009 St. Clair was married, had college aged children and lived in Oregon City, Oregon.

== Reception ==
St. Clair has been mentioned as being in the "finest journalistic traditions" of the US going back to Oregon journalist John Reed and I.F. Stone.

== Works ==
With Alexander Cockburn

- Whiteout: The CIA, Drugs and the Press (Verso, 1998) ISBN 978-1-85984-258-4
- Al Gore: A User's Manual (Verso, 2000) ISBN 978-1-85984-803-6
- Five Days That Shook The World: The Battle for Seattle and Beyond (Verso, 2000) ISBN 978-1-85984-779-4
- The Politics of Anti-Semitism, co-edited (AK Press, 2003) ISBN 978-1-902593-77-7
- Imperial Crusades: Iraq, Afghanistan and Yugoslavia (Verso, 2004) ISBN 978-1-84467-506-7
- Serpents in the Garden: Liaisons with Culture and Sex: CounterPunch Anthology, co-edited (AK Press, 2004) ISBN 978-1-902593-94-4

Other

- With James Ridgeway - A Pocket Guide to Environmental Bad Guys (Basic Books, 1999) ISBN 978-1-56025-153-8
- Been Brown So Long, It Looked Like Green to Me: The Politics of Nature (Common Courage Press, 2003) ISBN 978-1-56751-258-8
- Grand Theft Pentagon :Tales of Corruption and Profiteering in the War on Terror (Common Courage Press, 2005) ISBN 978-1-56751-336-3
- Born Under a Bad Sky: Notes from the Dark Side of the Earth (AK Press, 2007) ISBN 978-1-904859-70-3
- Co-editor with Joshua Frank - Red State Rebels: Tales of Grassroots Resistance in the Heartland (AK Press, 2008) ISBN 978-1-904859-84-0
- Co-editor with Joshua Frank - Hopeless: Barack Obama and the Politics of Illusion (AK Press, 2013) ISBN 978-1-84935-110-2
- Co-editor with Kevin Alexander Gray and JoAnn Wypijewski - Killing Trayvons: An Anthology of American Violence (CounterPunch via CreateSpace, 2014) ISBN 978-0-692-21399-5
- Bernie and the Sandernistas: Field Notes From a Failed Revolution. (CounterPunch via CreateSpace, 2016) ISBN 978-1539032724
