= Palestine Monitor =

Organization with a focus on Palestinian people

The Palestine Monitor is an organization that advocates for the Palestinian people, and publicizes conditions in the Gaza and West Bank. Topics featured by the Palestine Monitor include poverty, torture, the Israeli West Bank barrier, checkpoints, refugees, and East Jerusalem.

It was created in the immediate aftermath of the Al-Aqsa Intifada in 2000, as a Palestinian civil society undertaking, monitored by volunteers, to disseminate information on events on the ground. They employ a constantly updated email list, which grew from 50 to 13,000 in two years, to inform people over the internet of events regarding the West Bank. Its target audience consists of other NGOs, academia and the press.

They track Palestinian fatalities during the ongoing conflict on a fact sheet.
