= Daniel Bar-Tal =

Israeli psychologist (born 1946)

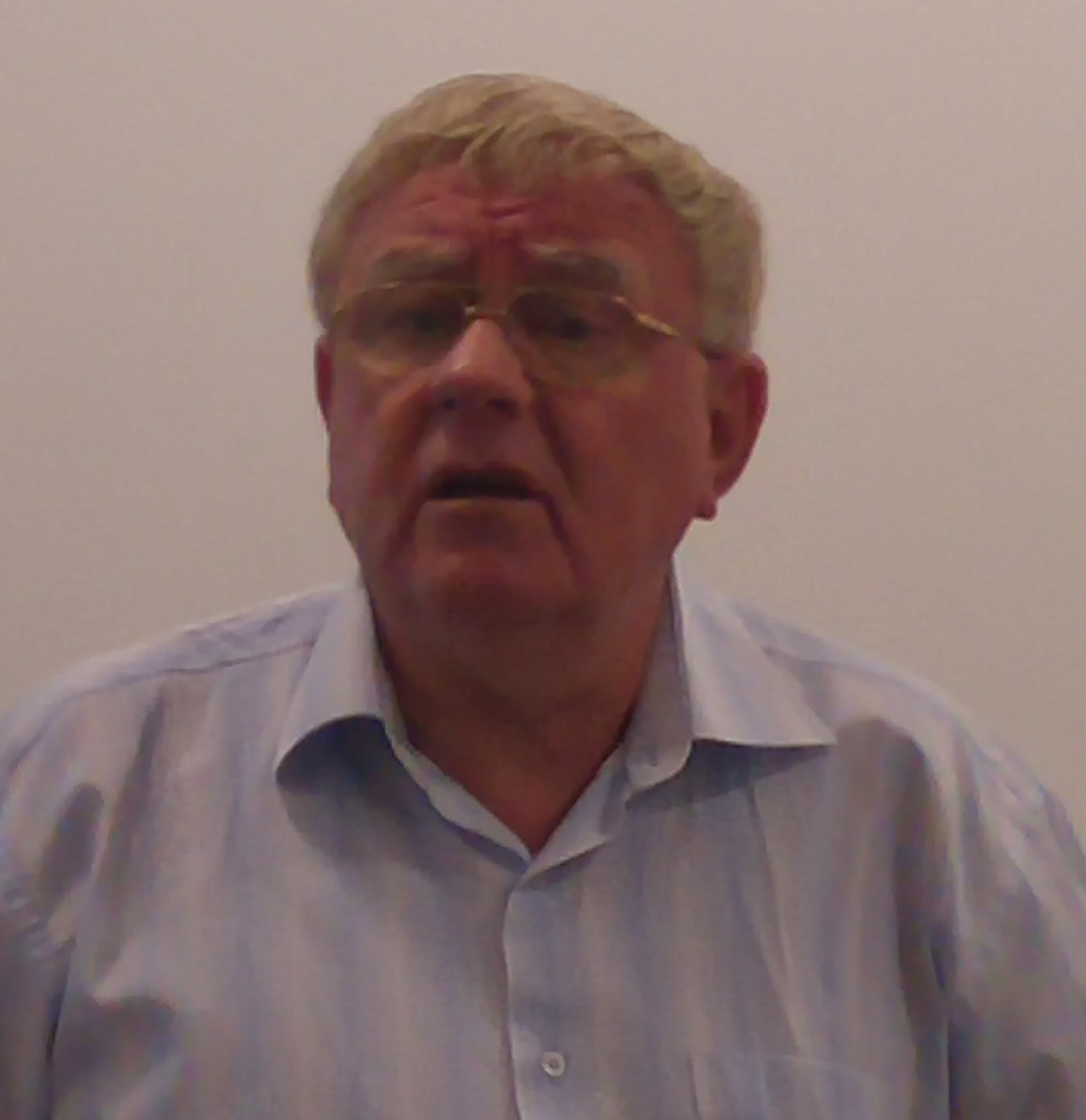

Daniel Bar-Tal (Hebrew: דניאל בר-טל; born 1946) is an Israeli political psychologist and Professor Emeritus at the School of Education, Tel Aviv University. He is known for his research on the socio-psychological foundations and dynamics of intractable conflict, particularly the Israeli-Palestinian conflict.

He was elected a foreign member of the Polish Academy of Sciences in 2017 and received the Morton Deutsch Conflict Resolution Award from Division 48 of the American Psychological Association in 2014. He served as President of the International Society of Political Psychology in 1999–2000, as Co-Editor in Chief of the Palestine-Israel Journal from 2001 to 2005, and as Co-Director of the European Summer Institute in Political Psychology.

== Biography ==
Bar-Tal was born on January 31, 1946, in Stalinabad (now Dushanbe), in the Tajik SSR of the Soviet Union, to Polish Jewish parents who had fled Poland in 1939. The family returned to Poland during his infancy, settling in Szczecin, where he lived until emigrating to Israel with his parents in 1957 at the age of eleven. He earned a B.A. in Psychology and Sociology from Tel Aviv University in 1970,[1] and an M.S. (1973) and Ph.D. (1974) in Social Psychology from the University of Pittsburgh.

After a postdoctoral fellowship at the Learning Research and Development Center at the University of Pittsburgh, he joined the School of Education at Tel Aviv University in 1975 as a Lecturer. He was promoted to Senior Lecturer (tenured) in 1979, Fellow Professor in 1983, and Full Professor in 1989. He held the Branco Weiss Chair for Research in Child Development and Education from 2008 to 2015. He retired in 2015 and was named Professor Emeritus.

Bar-Tal has held visiting positions at Vanderbilt University (1981–82), Brandeis University (1987–88, 2005–06, and 2010–11), the Ecole des Hautes Etudes en Sciences Sociales in Paris (1991), the University of Münster (1997), the University of Maryland (1995), as a fellow at the Netherlands Institute for Advanced Studies in Humanities and Social Sciences (2000-2001), the Institute of Psychology of the Polish Academy of Sciences in Warsaw (2001), the University of Palermo (2007–09), and the Australian National University (2014–15).

From 2002 to 2005, Bar-Tal served as Director of the Walter Lebach Research Institute for Jewish-Arab Coexistence through Education at Tel Aviv University. From 2001 to 2005, he was Co-Editor in Chief of the Palestine-Israel Journal. He served on the editorial board of the journal Political Psychology from 1999 to 2013.

Earlier in his career, Bar-Tal edited the Israeli Journal of Counseling and Psychology in Education (1977–81) and the Israeli Annals of Psychology and Counseling in Education (1982–89). He subsequently served on the editorial boards or advisory boards of the Applied Social Psychology Annual (1986–95), the European Journal of Social Psychology (1990–95), Social Psychology of Education (1994–2006), Advances in Political Psychology (2000–15), Conflict and Communication (2001–15), the International Journal of Psychology and Psychological Therapy (2001–15), the International Red Cross Review (2004–11), the International Journal of Conflict and Violence (2006–15), the Encyclopedia of Peace Psychology (2008–12), and the Journal of Social and Political Psychology (2012–15).

In 1998, he co-edited, with Klaus Boehnke, a special issue of Applied Psychology: An International Review devoted to political psychology. He has held memberships in the American Psychological Association (as a foreign member), the European Association of Social Psychology, the International Society of Political Psychology, the Society for the Psychological Study of Social Issues, and the Society for Personality and Social Psychology.

Bar-Tal held a series of positions in the International Society of Political Psychology over more than a decade, serving as an elected member of its Governing Council from 1988 to 1990, on the executive committee of the Political Psychology Division of the International Association of Applied Psychology from 1989 to 1994, as Vice President from 1994 to 1996, and as President from 1999 to 2000. He was also secretary of the Israel Society of Social Psychological Researchers from 1983 to 1987, and organised or co-organised international conferences in Warsaw (1980), Tel Aviv (1983 and 1984), Bad Homburg (1985), and Jerusalem (1993).

== Research ==
Bar-Tal’s research has focused on the socio-psychological foundations and dynamics of intractable conflict and peace-making. He developed original theoretical frameworks for siege mentality, intractable conflict, delegitimization, ethos of conflict, collective emotional orientation, socio-psychological infrastructure, collective victimhood,; culture of conflict, ethos of conflict, patriotism, security, self-censorship, brutalization, shared beliefs in a society, obedience, trust, delegitimization, barriers to conflict resolution, fear, collective memory, prejudice, political socialization, epistemic authority, interventions to conflict resolution, collective identity, collective narratives, occupation, Holocaust, reconciliation, peace education, democracy, authoritarianism, and collective memory.

These frameworks have been adopted and extended by other researchers in social sciences. A two-volume edited collection in Springer’s Peace Psychology Book Series, A Social Psychology Perspective on the Israeli-Palestinian Conflict: Celebrating the Legacy of Daniel Bar-Tal, applies his theory of intractable conflict across contributions by other scholars.

Bar-Tal’s key books include Group Beliefs (Springer, 1990), Shared Beliefs in a Society (Sage, 2000), Stereotypes and Prejudice in Conflict (Cambridge University Press, 2005, with Yona Teichman), Intractable Conflicts: Socio-Psychological Foundations and Dynamics (Cambridge University Press, 2013), and Sinking into the Honey Trap of the Intractable Conflict: The Case of the Israeli-Palestinian Conflict (Westphalia Press, 2023), translated into German, Polish, Japanese, and Italian. The 2023 book analyses how Israeli society developed a culture of conflict that perpetuates the violent intractable cycle.

Following the October 7, 2023 Hamas attacks and the subsequent Gaza War, Bar-Tal published a personal reflection essay in the Palestine-Israel Journal, describing his response to the conflict and the war as a scholar and citizen. Palestine-Israeli Journal published also articles about democracy and occupation, authoritarianism in Israel, failure of Israeli Jews to live by moral universal standards, underlying motivations of Hamas and Israel in Gaza war, and censorship and self-censorship in Israel. An academic interview conducted in February 2024 by James Liu and Veronica Hopner, published in Political Psychology in 2025, applied Bar-Tal’s intractable conflict theory directly to the crisis, examining ethos of conflict, collective memory, and collective emotional orientation before and after October 7. A separate interview conducted at the end of November 2025 investigated fear and hope in Israeli society after more than two years of regional warfare.. In 2026 he published an article in Journal of Humanitarian Conflict Resolution about From victims to perpetrators? The Israeli Jewish case and in the same year a chapter The evilness of the world: Obedience and delegitimization in a book published by Oxford University Press,

Bar-Tal’s in 2025 co-authored study in the British Journal of Social Psychology examined the role of acceptance in the effectiveness of the Informative Process Model, an intervention Bar-Tal developed for changing conflict-supporting narratives He was awarded with his ex-doctoral students Israel Science Foundation Grant 1590/20, jointly with Nimrod Rosler, Boaz Hameiri, and Keren Sharvit. His prior Israel Science Foundation grants funded a longitudinal study of socio-psychological barriers to peacemaking among Jews in Israel (2011–15) and subsequently research on paradoxical thinking as a conflict resolution intervention (2015–19). He published in 2024 Holistic article which explained the development of the Israeli-Palestinian conflict under the title A narrative of the Jewish-Palestinian conflict: Israeli Jewish academic version -Why? and How? A separate 2025 article in World Affairs examined the competing narratives told about the war by each side. His 2026 publications include a review article in Current Opinion in Psychology on narratives of collective memory in intractable conflict, and a book chapter in the Sage Handbook of Psychological Perspectives on Diversity, Equity, and Inclusion.

Bar-Tal with colleagues, co-authored a 2023 paper on human security psychology in the Review of General Psychology, a 2023 paper on perceiving change on the rival side of a conflict in the International Journal of Intercultural Relations, and a 2024 study in Cerebral Cortex examining the neural correlates of paradoxical thinking in conflict perspectives. The Informative Process Model was first proposed in a 2022 paper in Frontiers in Psychology, before its experimental evaluation was reported in the 2025 British Journal of Social Psychology study noted above.

In 1999, Bar-Tal founded a interdisciplinary learning community of ten to fifteen graduate and post-graduate students at a time drawn from different department of universities in and outside Israel, focused on the research of conflicts and their resolution. The community has operated continuously since its founding until 2015 and has trained numerous scholars who now hold academic positions worldwide.

Bar-Tal has served as Co-Director of the European Summer Institute in Political Psychology, an ongoing international academic training program, since 2001.

From 2006 to 2008, Bar-Tal was a lecturer at the National Security College of Israel that trained colonels, generals and high officials of security echelon, and from 2008 to 2009 he served on a public committee appointed by the Minister of Education to help form national policy on partnership education between Jews and Arabs in Israel. He had earlier headed the Ministry of Education’s Peace Education Steering Committee, having been appointed by the Minister of Education in 1994 to take responsibility for peace education within the ministry, serving from 1994 to 1996 and again from 1999 to 2000, and between 1984 and 1987 served as academic director of in-service training programmes for high school teachers in Jewish-Arab relations and, from 1985 to 1987, for high school principals in education for democracy.

== Selected theories ==
=== Culture of Conflict ===
Societies involved in harsh and violent conflicts such as intractable conflict evolve with time a socio-psychological repertoire that includes a well-organized system of societal beliefs, attitudes and emotions that fulfil a crucial role in meeting the challenges that such conflict poses. This is culture of conflict that develops when societies saliently integrate into their culture tangible and intangible symbols which are created to communicate a particular meaning about the prolonged and continuous experiences of living in the context of conflict as reflected in the noted themes that emerge. Symbols of conflict become hegemonic elements in the culture of societies involved in intractable conflict: They provide a dominant meaning about the present reality, about the past, and about future goals, and serve as guides for practice It facilitates adaptation to the conditions of conflict, enable coping with stressful and threatening conditions that accompany this type of conflict and helps to withstand the enemy. This repertoire, which crystallizes into collective memories of conflict, ethos of conflicts and collective emotional orientation, pertains to a number of crucial themes in times of conflict: It justifies the outbreak of the conflict and the course of its development, delegitimizes the rival, glorifies own group and presents it as the victim of the conflict, encourages mobilization for the conflict and sets security and patriotism as highly desirable values.

=== Delegitimization ===
One of the major psychological mechanisms that is responsible for much of the observed evil intergroup behaviors beginning with discrimination, through exploitation, slavery, mass killing, ethnic cleansing and even genocide is delegitimization of another group. Delegitimization is defined as categorization of a group, or groups, into extremely negative social categories that exclude it, or them, from the sphere of human groups that act within the limits of acceptable norms and/or values, since these groups are viewed as violating basic human norms or values and therefore deserve maltreatment. There are several types of delegitimizations: (a) Dehumanization that involves categorizing a group as nonhuman. This can be done by using subhuman epithets such as uncivilized savages, primitives, animals, or by using superhuman categories with negative connotations such as demons, monsters, and devils or by viewing the other as lacking basic human characteristics – being mechanistic (b) Trait characterization consists of attributing traits that are considered extremely negative and unacceptable in a given society. Traits such as aggressors, idiots, or parasites exemplify this type of delegitimization. (c) Out-casting consists of categorizing the adversary into groups that are considered violators of pivotal social norms, such as murderers, thieves, psychopaths, terrorists, or maniacs.. (d) Use of political labels involves categorization into political groups which are absolutely rejected by the values of the delegitimizing group, for example, Nazis, fascists, communists, Zionists, colonialists, or imperialists. These labels are culturally bound and their use depends on society’s cultural ideology. (e) Delegitimization by group comparison occurs when the delegitimized group is labeled by a name of a group that traditionally serves as an example of negativity in the delegitimizing group. Uses of such categories as ‘‘Vandals’’ or ‘‘Huns’’ are examples of this type of delegitimization. A special type of delegitimization that is common during intractable conflict is social categorization as an ‘‘enemy’’. The enemy is often presented in depersonalized abstract terms as a torturer, rapist, desecrator, beast, reptile, insect, germ, death, or devil. All these characteristics imply an intention of delegitimization.

=== Reconciliation ===
Reconciliation constitutes the psychological societal process that is a necessary condition for building stable and lasting peace. It involves changes of motivations, goals, beliefs, attitudes and emotions by the majority of society members. In fact, it is necessary that these changes will begin in pre-agreement phase in order to facilitate the peaceful resolution of the conflict and its support by the society members. Reconciliation is gradual, reciprocal and voluntary by its nature. The fundamental requirement is that the psychological basis will penetrate deep into societal fabric so as to be shared by the majority of both society members that were rivals. Only such change guarantees first the successful conflict resolution and later solidification of the peaceful relations between rival groups, because then stable foundations are formed that are rooted in the psyche of the people.

=== Siege mentality ===
One of the interesting social-political-psychological phenomena, which can be observed in different societies, pertains to the experience of being under siege That is, widely sharing a societal belief by society members that the rest of the world has highly negative intentions towards own society or that own society is surrounded by a hostile world. The focus is on "negative intentions" and "the rest of the world". "Negative intentions" refer to the desire and motivation of the world to inflict harm or to hurt society, so that they imply a threat to society’s wellbeing.

=== Brutalization ===
At times, societies engaged in violent conflicts or wars come to endorse and perpetrate exceptionally cruel forms of violence against their adversaries. This phenomenon, referred to as brutalization, has received surprisingly limited attention in political and social psychology. Rather than describing violent acts or their outcomes, it refers to the socio-psychological process through which collectives become increasingly willing to perpetrate cruel, merciless, and inhumane violence that exceeds instrumental military or political necessity. Brutalization thus explains not only what societies do to their victims, but also how prolonged conflict transforms the perpetrators' beliefs, emotions, patterns of behavior and moral norms, creating a societal repertoire that legitimizes, normalizes and routinizes exceptionally cruel forms of collective violence. Brutalization is defined as a socio-psychological process through which, under particular societal conditions, the cognitive, emotional, behavioral and normative orientations of a collective are transformed so that the intentional use of cruel, merciless, and inhumane violence against an adversary comes to be perceived as legitimate, necessary, morally justified, culturally accepted, and increasingly normalized and routinized.

=== Awards ===
- 2022: Award for Distinguished Scholar, Polish Social Psychological Society.
- 2022: Academic Honoris Causa, Carta Academica, awarded to honour his work on the social, psychological and political aspects of conflicts and conflict resolution.
- 2017: Elected foreign member of the Polish Academy of Sciences.
- 2014: Morton Deutsch Conflict Resolution Award, Society for the Study of Peace, Conflict, and Violence (Division 48 of the American Psychological Association). The award recognises notable contributions to integrating theory and practice in conflict resolution.
- 2013: Honorary membership, Polish Society of Social Psychology.
- 2012: Nevitt Sanford Award, International Society of Political Psychology, for scholars engaged in the practical application of political psychological principles.
- 2011: Lasswell Award, International Society of Political Psychology, for distinguished scientific contribution in political psychology.
- 2009: Otto Klineberg Intercultural and International Relations Award, SPSSI.
- 2008–2015: Branco Weiss Chair for Research in Child Development and Education.
- 2006: Alexander George Award, International Society of Political Psychology, for the best book in political psychology (Stereotypes and Prejudice in Conflict).
- 2006: Peace Scholar Award, Peace and Justice Studies Association.
- 2002: Second place, Otto Klineberg Intercultural and International Relations Award, SPSSI, for "Why Does Fear Override Hope."
- 2000–2001: Golestan Fellowship, Netherlands Institute for Advanced Study in the Humanities and Social Sciences.
- 1991: Otto Klineberg Intercultural and International Relations Award, SPSSI, for "The Israeli-Palestinian Conflict: A Cognitive Analysis."

== Selected publications ==
=== Selected books in English ===
- Bar-Tal, D. (2023). Sinking into the Honey Trap of the Intractable Conflict: The Case of the Israeli-Palestinian Conflict. Washington, DC: Westphalia Press. Translated into German, Polish, and Italian.
- Bar-Tal, D. (2013). Intractable Conflicts: Socio-Psychological Foundations and Dynamics. Cambridge: Cambridge University Press.
- Bar-Tal, D. & Teichman, Y. (2005). Stereotypes and Prejudice in Conflict: Representations of Arabs in Israeli Jewish Society. Cambridge: Cambridge University Press.
- Bar-Tal, D. (2000). Shared Beliefs in a Society: Social Psychological Analysis. Thousand Oaks, CA: Sage.
- Bar-Tal, D. (1990). Group Beliefs: A Conception for Analyzing Group Structure, Processes and Behavior. New York: Springer-Verlag.
- Bar-Tal, D. (1976). Prosocial behavior: Theory and research. New York: Halsted Press.

=== Selected edited book in English ===
- Bar-Tal, D., Nets-Zehngut, R., & Sharvit, K. (Eds), (2017). Self-censorship in contexts of conflict: Theory and research. Cham, Switzerland: Springer
- Alon, I., & Bar-Tal, D. (Eds.) (2016). The role of trust in conflict resolution: The Israeli-Palestinian case and beyond. Cham, Switzerland: Springer
- Bar-Tal D., & Schnell I. (Eds.), (2013). The impacts of lasting occupation: Lessons from Israeli society. New York: Oxford University Press.
- Bar-Tal, D. (Ed.), (2011) Intergroup conflicts and their resolution: Social psychological perspective. New York: Psychology Press.
- Raviv, A., Oppenheimer, L., & Bar-Tal, D. (Eds.) (1999). How children understand war and peace: A call for international peace education. San Francisco: Jossey Bass.
- Bar-Tal, D., Jacobson, D., & Klieman, A. (Eds.) (1998). Security concerns: Insights from the Israeli experience. Stamford, CT: JAI.
- Bar-Tal, D., & Staub, E. (Eds.) (1997). Patriotism in the life of individuals and nations. Chicago: Nelson-Hall.
- Bar-Tal, D., Graumann, C., Kruglanski, A.W., & Stroebe, W. (Eds.), (1989). Stereotypes and prejudice: Changing conceptions. New York: Springer-Verlag.
- Bar-Tal, D., & Kruglanski, A. (Eds.) (1988). The social psychology of knowledge. Cambridge: Cambridge University Press.
- Stroebe, W., Kruglanski, A., Bar-Tal, D., & Hewstone, M. (Eds), (1988). The social psychology of intergroup conflict. New York: Springer-Verlag.
- Staub, F., Bar-Tal, D., Karylowski, J., & Reykowski, J. (Eds.), (1984). Development and maintenance of prosocial behavior. New York: Plenum.
- Frieze, I., Bar-Tal, D., & Carroll, J.S. (Eds.), (1979). New approaches to social problems: Applications of attribution theory. San Francisco: Jossey-Bass. (Sponsored by SPISSI).
- Bar-Tal, D., & Saxe, L. (Eds.), (1978). Social psychology of education: Theory and research. New York: Halsted.

=== Articles and chapters ===
- Bar-Tal, D. (2026). Narratives of collective memory in intractable conflict: The Israeli case. Current Opinion in Psychology, 67.
- Bar-Tal, D. (2025). "The Told Story of the Gaza War." World Affairs. https://doi.org/10.1002/waf2.70005
- Bar-Tal, D. (2025). "Daniel Bar-Tal, on the Israeli-Palestinian conflict, before and after October 7, 2023: In conversation with James Liu and Veronica Hopner." Political Psychology, 46(6), 1419–1439.
- Schnell, I. & Bar-Tal, D. (2026). Barriers to the ending of territorial expansion: The Israeli case. Peace and Conflict: Journal of Peace Psychology, 32(1), 35–43.
- Hodgetts, D., Hopner, V., Carr, S., Bar-Tal, D., Liu, J., Saner, R., Yiu, L., Horgan, J., Searle, R., Massola, G., Hakim, M., Marai, L., King, P., & Moghaddam, F. (2023). "Human security psychology: A linking construct for an eclectic discipline." Review of General Psychology, 27, 177–193.
- Bar-Tal, D. (2019). The challenges of social and political psychology in pursuit of peace: Personal account. Peace and Conflict: Journal of Peace Psychology, 25, 192-197.
- Bar-Tal, D., Diamond, A., & Nasie, M. (2017). Political socialization of young children in intractable conflicts. International Journal of Behavioral Development, 41, 415-425
- Bar-Tal, D., Oren, N., & Nets-Zehngut, R. (2014). Sociopsychological analysis of conflict-supporting narratives: A general framework. Journal of Peace Research, 51, 662-675
- Bar-Tal, D., & Hammack, P. L. (2012). Conflict, delegitimization, and violence. In L. R. Tropp (Ed.), The Oxford handbook of intergroup conflict (pp.29-52). New York: Oxford University Press.
- Bar-Tal, D., Sharvit, K., Halperin, E. & Zafran, A. (2012). Ethos of conflict: The concept and its measurement. Peace & Conflict. Journal of Peace Psychology, 18, 40-61.
- Bar-Tal, D., Chernyak-Hai, L., Schori, N., & Gundar, A. (2009). A sense of self-perceived collective victimhood in intractable conflicts. International Red Cross Review, 91, 229-277.
- David, O., & Bar-Tal, D. (2009). A socio-psychological conception of collective identity: The case of national identity. Personality and Social Psychology Review, 13, 354-379.
- Bar-Tal, D., & Rosen, Y. (2009). Peace education in societies involved in intractable conflicts: Direct and indirect models. Review of Educational Research, 79, 557-575.
- Bar-Tal, D. (2007). Sociopsychological foundations of intractable conflicts. American Behavioral Scientist, 50, 1430-1453.
- Bar-Tal, D. (2001). Why does fear override hope in societies engulfed by intractable conflict, as it does in the Israeli society? Political Psychology, 22, 601-627.
- Bar-Tal, D. (1998). The rocky road toward peace: Societal beliefs functional to intractable conflict in Israeli school textbooks. Journal of Peace Research, 35, 723-742.
- Bar-Tal, D. (1996). Development of social categories and stereotypes in early childhood: The case of "the Arab" concept formation, stereotype and attitudes by Jewish children in Israel. International Journal of Intercultural Relations, 20, 341-370.
- Bar-Tal, D. (1993). Patriotism as fundamental beliefs of group members. Politics and Individual, 3, 45-62.
- Bar-Tal, D., & Antebi, D. (1992). Siege mentality in Israel. International Journal of Intercultural Relations, 16, 251-275.
- Bar-Tal, D., & Bar-Tal, G. (2022). The Holocaust and its teaching in Israel in view of the conflict: General and pedagogical implications and lessons. In D. Yitzhaki, T. Gallagher, N. Aloni, A., & Z. Gross (Eds.). Activist pedagogy and shared education in divided societies: International perspectives and next practices (pp. 235-254). Leiden: Brill Publishers
- Bar-Tal, D. (2019). Transforming conflicts: Barriers and overcoming them. In M. Elman, C. Gerard, G. Golan, & L. Kriesberg (Eds.), Overcoming intractable conflicts: New approaches to constructive transformation (pp. 221-241). Lanham, MD: Rowman and Littlefield
- Bar-Tal, D., & Halperin, E. (2013). The psychology of intractable conflicts: Eruption, escalation, and peacemaking. In L. Huddy, D. O. Sears, & J. S. Levy (Eds.), The Oxford handbook of political psychology (2nd ed. pp.923-956). New York: Oxford University Press
- Bar-Tal, D., & Bennink, G. H. (2004). The nature of reconciliation as an outcome and as a process. In Y. Bar-Siman- Tov (Ed.). From conflict resolution to reconciliation (pp.11-38). Oxford: Oxford University Press
- Bar-Tal, D. (1991). Contents and origins of the Israelis' beliefs about security, International Journal of Group Tensions, 21, 237-261.
- Bar-Tal, D., Halperin, E., & de Rivera, J. (2007). Collective emotions in conflict situations: Societal implications. Journal of Social Issues, 63, 441-460.
- Bar-Tal, D. (2000). From intractable conflict through conflict resolution to reconciliation: Psychological analysis. Political Psychology, 21, 351-365.
- Adwan, S., Bar-Tal, D., & Wexler, B. (2016). Portrayal of the other in Palestinian and Israel schoolbooks: A comparative study. Political Psychology, 37. 201-217.
- Bar-Tal, D. (2017). Self-censorship as a socio-psychological phenomenon: Conception and research. Advances in Political Psychology, 38, 37-65
- Bar-Tal, D., Hameiri, B., & Halperin, E. (2021). Paradoxical thinking as a paradigm of attitude change in the context of intractable conflict. Advances in Experimental Social Psychology, 63, 129-187
- Bar-Tal, D., Vered, S., & Fuxman, S. (2021). Between opened-minded critical thinking and closedminded allegiance: Educational tensions in societies involved in intractable conflict, Advances in Political Psychology, 42, 3-28
- Bar-Tal, D. (2022). "Is a confederation between Israel and Palestine with Jordan a viable arrangement?" World Affairs, 185, 737–765.
- Bar-Tal, D., Trew, K., Hameiri, B., Stevenson, C., & Nahhas, E. (2021). Ethos of conflict as the prism to evaluate the Northern Irish and the Israeli-Palestinian conflicts by the involved societies: A comparative analysis. Peace and Conflict: Journal of Peace Psychology, 27(3), 415-425.
