= PropOrNot =

Website

- PropOrNot logo
- Type: Website
- Legal status: Online
- Official language: English
- Executive Director: Anonymous
- Website: www.propornot.com/p/home.html

PropOrNot is an anonymous website that claims to expose Russian propaganda. It has been featured in The Washington Post about Russian propaganda and the spread of fake news. PropOrNot's methods, lack of editorial staff and opaque methods of defining propaganda have received criticism.

== Operations and organization ==
The website is written anonymously; a spokesperson for the website who spoke by phone to The New Yorker was described as an American male who was "well versed in Internet culture and swore enthusiastically." The same spokesperson said that the group comprised around 40 individuals. Writing in Rolling Stone, Matt Taibbi opined that based on "its Twitter responses to criticism of its report, PropOrNot sounded not like a group of sophisticated military analysts, but like one teenager".

=== Compiled list ===
On November 30, 2016, PropOrNot published a list of some 200 websites they classify as Russian propaganda based on "a combination of manual and automated analysis, including analysis of content, timing, technical indicators, and other reporting". The group's list includes Zero Hedge, Naked Capitalism, the Ron Paul Institute, Black Agenda Report, Truthout, Truthdig, antiwar.com, and many others, which the group suggests are "consistently, uncritically, and one-sidedly echoing, repeating, being used by, and redirecting their audiences to Russian official and semi-official state media".

CounterPunch in response called PropOrNot a "shady little group," its findings "bogus," and their inclusion on the list a "baseless allegation." After email communications, PropOrNot agreed to remove CounterPunch from the list.

PropOrNot has said there was a Russian propaganda effort involved in propagating fake news during the 2016 United States presidential election. PropOrNot has said it analyzed data from Twitter and Facebook and tracked propaganda from a disinformation campaign by Russia that had a national reach of 15 million people within the United States. PropOrNot concluded that accounts belonging to both Russia Today and Sputnik News promoted "false and misleading stories in their reports," and additionally magnified other false articles found on the Internet to support their propaganda effort.

In 2021, a study in the Journal of Information Warfare examined the claims of PropOrNot and found evidence in support of its claims. The content analysis paper compared how Russian state media, and some of the outlets labelled as Russian propaganda by PropOrNot, addressed certain foreign policy topics such as Russia, Syria, Iran, Venezuela, and NATO. The study found that there was a strong correlation between the narratives promoted by Russia Today and Sputnik News, and those promoted by selected alternative media outlets, such as Zero Hedge, "New Cold War", Global Research, and "The Daily Sheeple".

In January 2023, PropOrNot was suspended from Twitter.

== Criticism ==
PropOrNot's methods and anonymity have received criticism from publications such as The New Yorker, The Intercept, and as well as Fairness and Accuracy in Reporting.

Andrew Cockburn, Washington editor for Harper's, was sharply critical of The Washington Post's decision to put the story on its front page, calling the article a "sorry piece of trash." Writers in The Intercept, Fortune, and Rolling Stone challenged The Washington Post for including a report by an organization with no reputation for fact-checking (such as PropOrNot itself) in an article on "fake news." Writing for The Intercept, journalists Glenn Greenwald and Ben Norton were particularly critical of the inclusion of Naked Capitalism on the list of "useful idiots" for Russian propagandists.

Writing in The New Yorker, Adrian Chen said that he had been previously contacted by the organization, but had chosen not to follow up with them. Looking more carefully into their methodology, he argued that PropOrNot's criteria for establishing propaganda - which included critical commentary of the United States, the European Union and NATO - were so broad that they could have included "not only Russian state-controlled media organizations, such as Russia Today, but nearly every news outlet in the world, including the Post itself" on their list. Eliot Higgins, founder of the open-source journalism website Bellingcat, referred to the methodology report as "pretty amateur" and told Chen: "I think it should have never been an article on any news site of any note."

In December 2016, after receiving criticism, The Washington Post appended an "Editor's Note" to its article in response to the criticism of PropOrNot's list of websites. The note read, "The Post, which did not name any of the sites, does not itself vouch for the validity of PropOrNot's findings regarding any individual media outlet, nor did the article purport to do so." The Columbia Journalism Review said the Editor's Note left "much to be desired": "The Post diminished its credibility at a time when media credibility is in short supply, and the non-apologetic editor’s note doesn’t help."

== See also ==
- 2016 United States election interference by Russia
- Hamilton 68
