= Michael Prior (theologian) =

Irish theologian and anti-Zionist (1942–2004)

Michael Prior, CM (15 March 1942 – 21 July 2004) was a priest of the Congregation of the Mission, professor of biblical theology at Saint Mary's College, University of Surrey, and a liberation theologian. He was one of the more colourful and controversial figures in the Catholic Church in Great Britain, and an outspoken critic of Israel and of Zionism.

== Biography ==
Prior was born in Cork in 1942. He entered the Congregation of the Mission on leaving school and took a degree in Physics at University College Dublin. Trained at Vincentian Seminary in St Joseph's, Blackrock, on completing his theological studies he was ordained in Castleknock College in 1969. After ordination he studied Semitic Languages, gaining his Licentiate in Sacred Scripture in Rome in 1972. He then obtained a PhD on the theology of St Paul from King's College London.

For three years he was director of the Vincentian Formation, followed by two years at Bishop Ullathorne Roman Catholic School, Coventry. In 1977, he was appointed to St Mary's College, Twickenham, first as lecturer in theology, then as department head (1987–97), and subsequently as professor of Theology and Religious Studies.

== Work ==
Prior was an anti-Zionist and believed that biblical scholarship encouraged collusion in the oppression of the Palestinian people. In his book, The Bible and Colonialism: a moral critique, Prior argued that the biblical narrative of the Exodus from Egypt and the Conquest of Canaan had been deployed to justify what he considered colonialism in Palestine, the Americas, and South Africa.

In his book, Zionism and the State of Israel: a moral inquiry, Prior developed a moral critique of Zionism, emphasizing its secular roots and the relatively recent character of support for Zionism by religious Jewry. Prior also claimed that the expulsion of the Palestinians, far from being a consequence of the Nazi Holocaust or of the fortunes of war in 1948, had been planned by the founding fathers of Zionism from the beginning. Prior believed that Zionism was morally flawed from 1948, when the first war was fought.

== Published works ==
- Western Scholarship and the History of Palestine. Melisende. 1998.
- The Bible and Colonialism: A Moral Critique. Continuum International Publishing Group. 1997.
- Zionism and the State of Israel: A Moral Inquiry. Psychology Press. 1999.
- Aruri, Naseer, ed. (2005). Speaking the Truth: Zionism, Israel, and Occupation. A collection of essays by various authors. Olive Branch Press.
- Naim Ateek; Michael Prior (1999). Holy Land, Hollow Jubilee: God, Justice, and the Palestinians. Melisende.
- Macpherson, Duncan, ed. (2006). A Living Stone: Selected Essays and Addresses. Edited with an introduction by Duncan Macpherson. Holy Land Trust / Melisende.
