= Michael Neumann =

Professor (emeritus) of Philosophy

Michael Neumann (born 1946) is a professor of philosophy at Trent University in Ontario, Canada. He is the author of What's Left? Radical Politics and the Radical Psyche (1988), The Rule of Law: Politicizing Ethics (2002) and The Case Against Israel (2005), and has published papers on utilitarianism and rationality.

== Background and career ==
Neumann is the son of German Jewish refugees, one of them the eminent political sociologist of Nazism, Franz Leopold Neumann. He is a US citizen and resident of Canada. Neumann graduated summa cum laude with a B.A. in English and History from Columbia University in 1968, and in 1975 was awarded his Ph.D. in philosophy by the University of Toronto.

Neumann has taught at Trent University since 1975. He became a full professor in 2003. His interests at Trent University include ethics, political philosophy, formal logic, philosophy of logic, and metaphysics. He has published papers on utilitarianism and rationality. He is a faculty member of the university's Centre for the Study of Global Power and Politics.

== Israeli–Palestinian conflict and antisemitism ==
Neumann takes the position, not substantially different from that of John Mearsheimer and Stephen Walt, that support of Israel in the Israeli–Palestinian conflict is against US interests. He also considers it a primary cause of violence against the US.

Neumann's position has been attacked both by spokesmen for Jewish communities and by antisemites, from diametrically opposed positions.

Responding in part to some of these essays, the Canadian Jewish Congress (CJC) wrote a letter of complaint to the president of Trent University.

Equally, antisemites have also attacked Neumann's classical and nuanced stance precisely because of the distinction he has made between a political critique of Israel and hostility to Jews per se on racist grounds. According to this extremist view, there is no such distinction to be made:

‘Neumann's approach is . . . a double-edged sword since it reinforces the notion that Israel/Zionism -- not Jews/Judaism -- is the source of the problems facing the Mid-East.’

=== Jewish Tribal Review controversy ===
Jewish Tribal Review (JTR) was a website which claims to "document Jewish and Zionist influence on popular culture, economics and politics" (it is now a defunct listing). JTR became interested in Michael Neumann's writing, and in late 2002 started an email dialogue with him. JTR asked for Neumann's participation in their activities, but Neumann, who considers JTR antisemitic, refused to participate, explaining his position as follows:

"My sole concern is indeed to help the Palestinians, and I try to play for keeps. I am not interested in the truth, or justice, or understanding, or anything else, except so far as it serves that purpose. This means, among other things, that if talking about Jewish power doesn't fit my strategy, I won't talk about it."

Subsequently, JTR created a page publishing their alleged email exchange without Neumann's permission. This email got widespread attention in August 2003 when the National Post published one of Neumann's most passionate passages about Jews and Israel. In particular, Neumann was quoted as writing:

"If an effective strategy means that some truths about the Jews don't come to light, I don't care. If an effective strategy [of helping the Palestinians] means encouraging reasonable anti-Semitism, or reasonable hostility to Jews, I also don't care. If it means encouraging vicious, racist anti-Semitism, or the destruction of the state of Israel, I still don't care."

In the ensuing controversy, Neumann clarified exactly what he intended by this statement:

'I will not self-censor my writings because they may be misused by antisemites, and it is only in this very particular and limited sense that I 'don't care' about encouraging antisemitism. Antisemites misuse all sorts of materials, including the statements of committed Zionists and of Mahatma Gandhi. It would be futile and impossible for me to tailor my writings to avoid such misuse.'

Nonetheless, the publication prompted complaints from the Canadian Jewish Congress. In September, 2003, Neumann sent a letter of regret to the CJC. According to the Peterborough Examiner, "Congress chairman Ed Morgan, who accepted the letter of regret from Neumann, told The Examiner he wants the letter to close the matter." On his Israel-Palestine page, Neumann includes a detailed "reply to the Canadian Jewish Congress concerning objections to material which appeared on the Jewish Tribal Review web site".

=== Support for boycott of Israeli professors ===
In January 2009, Neumann expressed support for a proposed resolution by Canadian Union of Public Employees (CUPE) to ban Israeli professors from working in Ontario Universities. Neumann stated that "If people believe these are extreme circumstances and it will do some good, then I think it's reasonable and perhaps justified." He argued that a boycott is not antisemitic, stating that "It targets Israeli, not Jewish, professors." He further stated that "People may always have bad motives underlying good motives. And it's not absolutely impossible that some of these people have anti-Semitic feelings deep down, but do I think that plays a large part? No, I certainly do not."

=== Request to remove his grandmother’s name from the Wall at Yad Vashem ===
In February 2009, Neumann and his brother Osha Neumann asked the Israeli president to remove their grandmother's name from the Yad Vashem because of the 2008-2009 Israeli offensive in the Gaza Strip.

The Yad Vashem leadership has never commented on the requests, or given any indication they have considered them, and no changes have occurred in the site's listings as of November 2022.

=== Invitation to speak in Parliament and subsequent controversy ===
In April 2009, the Canada-Palestine Parliamentary Association invited Neumann to speak at a committee session on Parliament Hill, although it declined to comment as to why he was invited. The invitation immediately became a controversy. The Conservative Party announced that none of their Members of Parliament will attend the speech. A spokesperson for Citizenship and Immigration Minister, Jason Kenney, stated that "Mr. Neumann has the right to air his noxious views. The corollary, of course, is that we can and must criticize them. Neumann’s farrago of cant, conspiracy theory and hate are completely repugnant to our government." Bob Rae, the Liberal Party's foreign affairs critic, stated that Neumann was entitled to his opinions but that he was "surprised and disappointed" that the parliamentary group thought Mr. Neumann had something positive to contribute.

==== Opposition to the destruction of Israel ====
On April 21, 2009, Neumann gave an interview in which he stated that Israel is an "illegitimate state" but also stated that Israel should not be destroyed. He quoted from his book The Case Against Israel in which he wrote that "The cure of destruction is worse than the disease of illegitimate existence. In practise, wiping out a powerful state like Israel or the U.S. would cause even more suffering than letting it survive."

== Bibliography ==
- What's Left: Radical Politics and the Radical Psyche. 1988. Broadview Press. ISBN 0-921149-22-0
- The Rule of Law: Politicizing Ethics. 2002. Ashgate Press. ISBN 0-7546-0525-6
- The Case Against Israel. 2005. AK Press. ISBN 1-904859-46-1
