= Henry Cockburn =

Henry Cockburn may refer to:

- Henry Cockburn (bishop) (died 1476), Scottish prelate, Bishop of Ross
- Henry Cockburn, Lord Cockburn (1779–1854), Scottish judge and author
- Henry Cockburn (consul) (1859–1927), British Consul, grandson of the above
- Henry Cockburn (footballer) (1921–2004), English international football player
