= Henry Cockburn, Lord Cockburn =

Scottish lawyer, judge and literary figure (1779–1854)

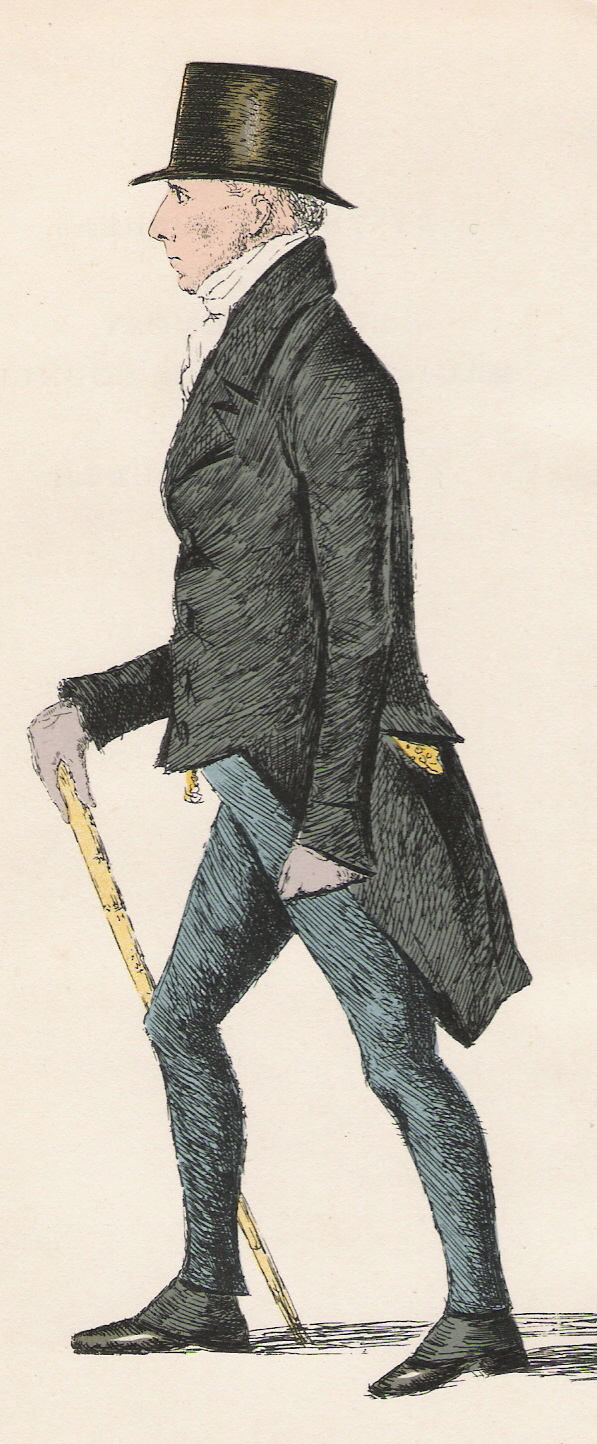
Portrait of Cockburn from the etching in Crombie's Modern Athenians

Henry Thomas Cockburn of Bonaly, Lord Cockburn (/ˈkoʊbərn/ KOH-bərn; 26 October 1779 – 26 April 1854) between 1830 and 1834.

== Background and education ==
His mother Janet Rannie was a sister-in-law of the influential Lord Melville, through her sister Elizabeth, and his father, Archibald Cockburn, was Sheriff of Midlothian and Baron of the Court of Exchequer. He was educated at the Royal High School and the University of Edinburgh.

His brother, John Cockburn FRSE (died 1862), was a wine merchant and founder of Cockburn's of Leith.

== Literary career ==
Cockburn contributed regularly to the Edinburgh Review. In this popular magazine of its day he is described as: "rather below the middle height, firm, wiry and muscular, inured to active exercise of all kinds, a good swimmer, an accomplished skater, an intense lover of the fresh breezes of heaven. He was the model of a high-bred Scotch gentleman. He spoke with a Doric breadth of accent. Cockburn was one of the most popular men north of the Tweed." He was a member of the famous Speculative Society, to which Sir Walter Scott, Henry Brougham and Francis Jeffrey belonged.

The extent of Cockburn's literary ability only became known after he had passed his 70th year, on the publication of his biography of lifelong friend Lord Jeffrey in 1852, and from his chief literary work, the Memorials of his Time, which appeared posthumously in 1856. His published work continued with his Journal, published in 1874. These constitute an autobiography of the writer interspersed with notices of manners, public events, and sketches of his contemporaries, of great interest and value.

== Legal and judicial career ==
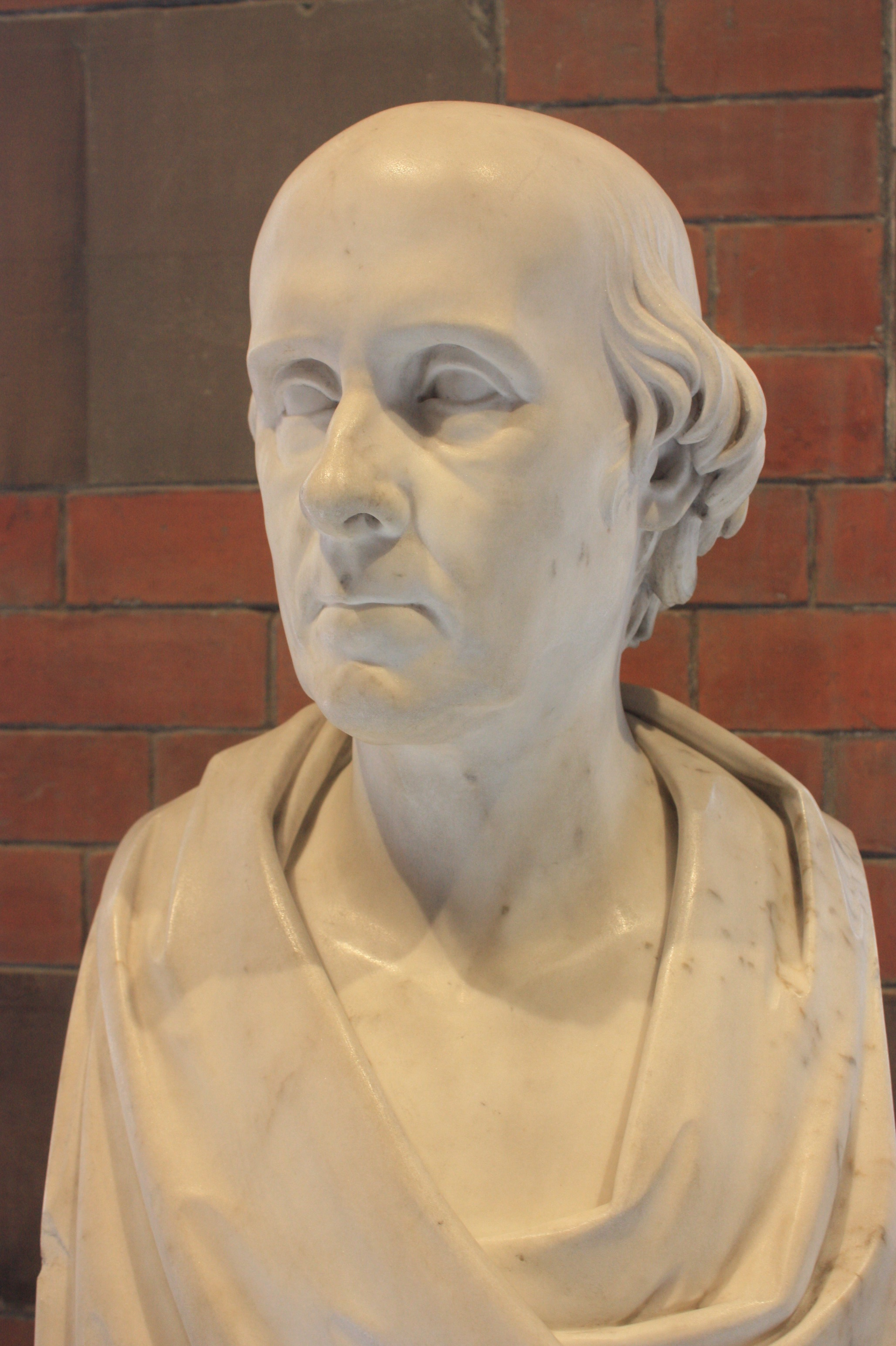
Statue of Lord Cockburn by William Brodie

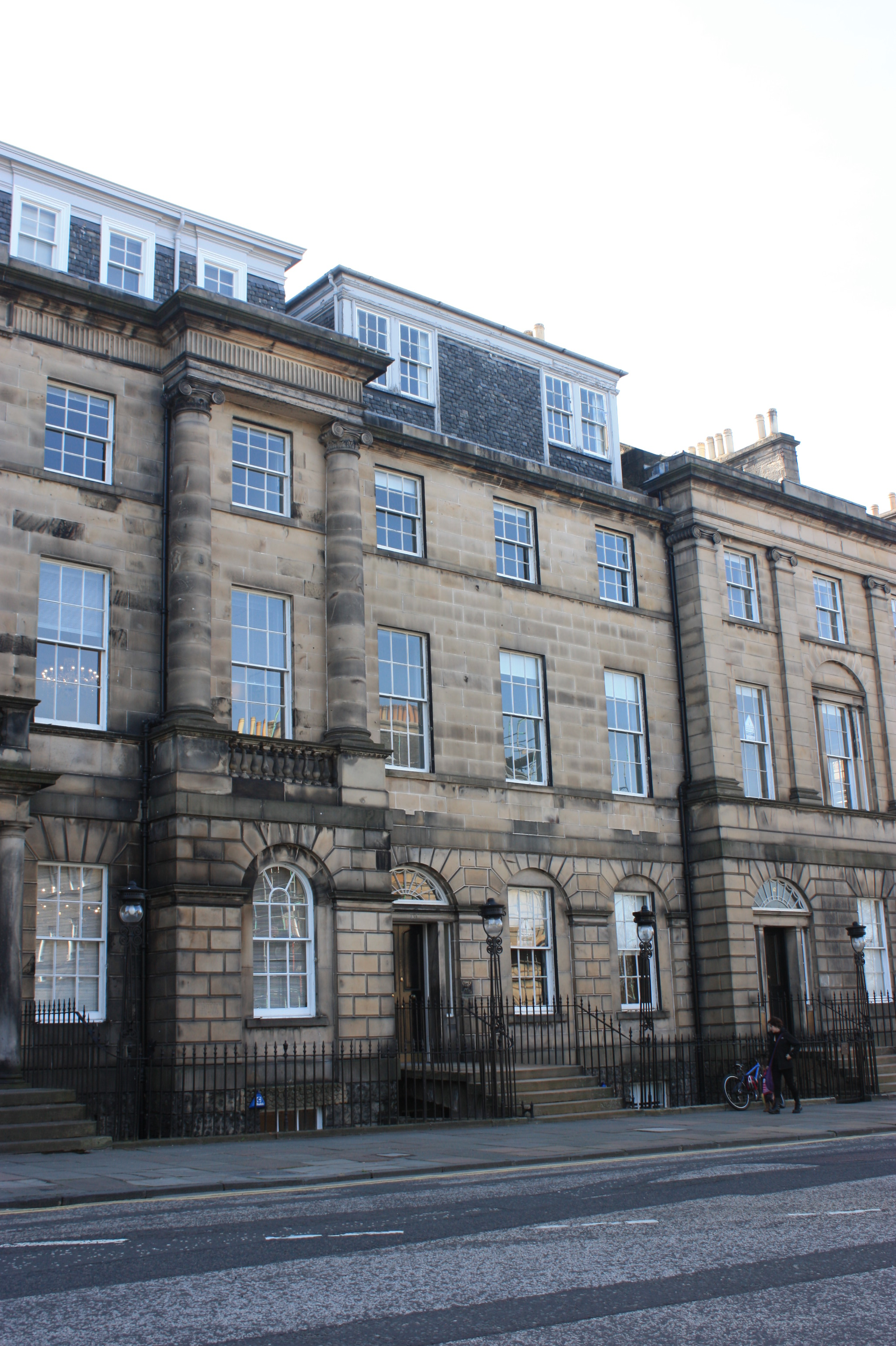
14 Charlotte Square, Edinburgh, the town house of Lord Cockburn

Cockburn entered the Faculty of Advocates in 1800, and attached himself, not to the party of his relatives, who could have afforded him most valuable patronage, but to the Whig party, and that at a time when it held out few inducements to men ambitious of success in life. He became a distinguished advocate, and ultimately a judge. He was one of the leaders of the Whig party in Scotland in its days of darkness prior to the Reform Act 1832, and was a close friend of Sir Thomas Dick Lauder. He was the defence lawyer for Helen McDougal, Burke's wife, in the trial for the Burke and Hare murders, and won her acquittal.

On the accession of Earl Grey's ministry in 1830 he became Solicitor General for Scotland. During his time here he drafted the First Scottish Reform Bill. In 1834 he was raised to the bench, and on taking his seat as a Judge in the Court of Session he adopted the title of Lord Cockburn as a Scottish Lord of Session.

== Conservation ==
Whilst Lord Cockburn's name is usually associated with building conservation, this reputation is somewhat misplaced as his interest was very selective. In 1845 he purchased the entire estate of Bonaly, south-west of Edinburgh. He rebuilt the farmhouse in a romantic fashion, adding a tower, and renaming it Bonaly Tower. However, the rest of the village (which appears to have dated from the 17th century or older) was razed to the ground to improve views from his new house. There is no record of what became of the inhabitants of the village.

== Family ==
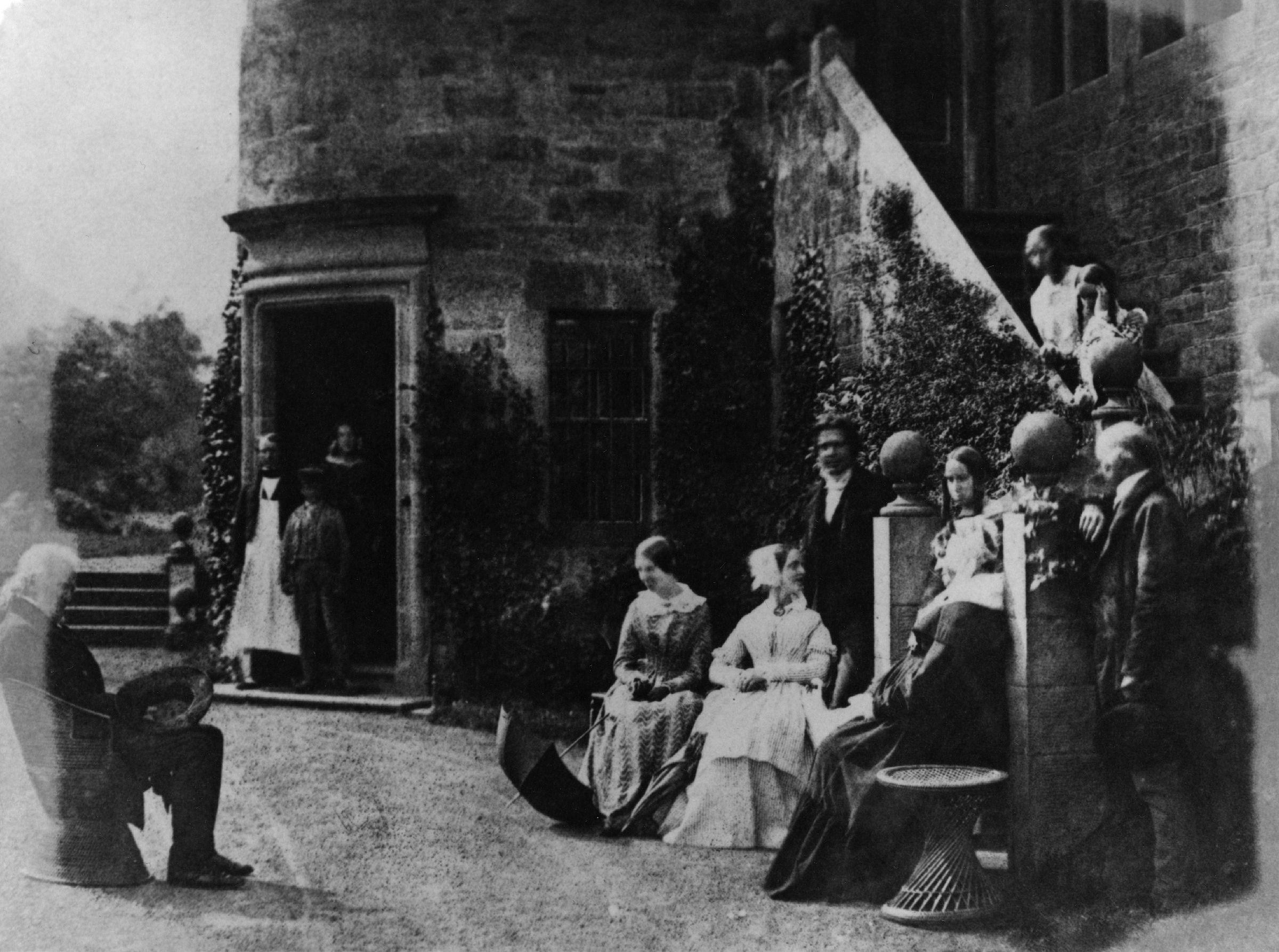
Henry Cockburn, Lord Cockburn, his family, David Octavius Hill and John Henning by Robert Adamson, 1840s

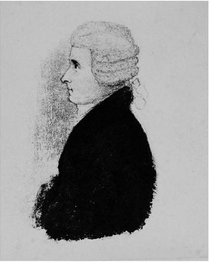
Henry Cockburn, Lord Cockburn by Robert Scott Moncrieff

Cockburn married Elizabeth Macdowall, daughter of James Macdowall and his second wife Margaret Jamieson, in Edinburgh, Midlothian, on 12 March 1811. As was common in the period he had both a town house and country house. The country house was at Bonaly, on the south-west edge of Edinburgh. His large town house at 14 Charlotte Square, in the west end of the city, was designed by Robert Adam. They had five daughters and six sons:

- Margaret Day Cockburn (Edinburgh, Midlothian, 24 January 1812, bap. Edinburgh, Midlothian, 25 February 1812 – 1818) (buried in St Cuthberts churchyard in Edinburgh
- Jane Cockburn (Edinburgh, Midlothian, 1813, bap. Edinburgh, Midlothian, 22 July 1813 – )
- Archibald William Cockburn, FRCSE (Edinburgh, Midlothian, 5 December 1814, bap. Edinburgh, Midlothian, 23 December 1814 – Murrayfield, Midlothian, 13 January 1862), Fellow of the Royal College of Surgeons of Edinburgh, married at St. Cuthbert's, Edinburgh, Midlothian, on 12 March 1844 to Mary Ann Balfour (2 November 1816 – ?), and had four sons:
  - Henry Cockburn (1849 – ?)
  - James Balfour Cockburn (Edinburgh, Midlothian, 22 July 1851 – ?)
  - Archibald Francis Cockburn (bap. Edinburgh, Midlothian, 8 November 1853 – ?)
  - Moncrieff Cockburn (Edinburgh, Midlothian, 22 September 1855 – ?)
- James Macdowell Cockburn (bap. Edinburgh, Midlothian, 7 March 1816 – ?)
- Graham Cockburn, a daughter (bap. Edinburgh, Midlothian, 7 March 1817 – ?), married Rev. Robert Walter Stewart (later Moderator of the General Assembly of the Free Church of Scotland)
- George Ferguson Cockburn (Edinburgh, Midlothian, 31 January 1818 – 1866), married to Sarah Charlotte Bishop, and had four daughters:
  - Elizabeth Frances Cockburn (1845–1925), married to Henry Charles Biddulph Cotton Raban (1837 – Chittagong, Bengal, 20 March 1871), who was with the Bengal Civil Service, and had one daughter:
    - Catherine Charlotte Raban (Chittagong, Bengal, 12 June 1870 – 1954), married at Axebridge, Somerset, in 1893 to Arthur Waugh (1866–1943) and had two sons, Alec Waugh and Evelyn Waugh
  - Isabella Graham Cockburn (c. 1848 – Kensington, London, 5 January 1926), married on 31 January 1894 as his third wife to Sir James Shaw Hay (25 October 1839 – 20 June 1924), without issue
  - Mary Ann Amy Macrae Cockburn (Calcutta, 29 August 1855 – 23 April 1942), married on 6 June 1877 to Walter St. George Burke of Auberies, Bulmer, Essex, JP (27 April 1842 – 17 February 1916), Lieutenant Colonel in the service of the Royal Engineers, Justice of the Peace for Essex and for Suffolk, son of James St. George Burke and wife Anne Eliza Grubbe, and had issue
  - Georgina Maria Joanna Cockburn, married Spencer Campbell Thomson FRSE FFA in 1869
- Henry Day Cockburn (Edinburgh, Midlothian, 21 April 1820 – ?), married at South Yarra, Victoria, in 1857 to Mary Ann Matherley
- Lawrence Cockburn (Edinburgh, Midlothian, 25 February 1822 – Brighton, Victoria, 2 September 1871), a squatter, married at Brighton, Victoria, in 1859 to Annie Maria Smith, and had one son:
  - Henry Cockburn (Melbourne, Victoria, 1862 – ?)
- Francis Jeffrey Cockburn (Edinburgh, Midlothian, 8 January 1825 – Brentford, London, 10 July 1893), a Judge in India and with the Bengal Civil Service, and wife (Calcutta or Westbury, Tasmania, 25 January 1855) Elizabeth Anne (Eliza Ann) Pitcairn (Hobart, Tasmania, 23 September 1831, bap. Hobart, Tasmania, 7 November 1831 – Wycombe, Oxfordshire, 1923), daughter of Robert Pitcairn (Edinburgh, Midlothian, 17 July 1802 – Hobart, Tasmania, 1868) (son of David Pitcairn and Mary Henderson) and wife (m. Hobart, Tasmania, 30 September 1830) Dorothy/Dorothea Jessy Dumas, and had five daughters and two sons:
  - Helen Macdowall Cockburn (Calcutta, 14 June 1857, bap. Calcutta, 17 July 1857 – ?)
  - Henry Cockburn (Calcutta, 2 March 1859 – 1927?)
  - Elizabeth Pitcairn Cockburn (Calcutta, 20 March 1863, bap. Calcutta, 25 April 1863 – ?)
  - Robert Pitcairn Cockburn (Bengal, 1865, bap. Sylhet, Bengal, 7 December 1865 – ?), married at South Stoneham, Hampshire, in 1909 to Elinor Francis Mary Bellett (31 January 1881 – 16 September 1975), and had three sons and one daughter:
    - Francis Bellett Cockburn (Brentford, London, 31 July 1910 – ?)
    - Robert Waring Pitcairn Cockburn (Brentford, London, 1911 – ?), married to Jean Elizabeth Swinnerton and had one son and one daughter:
      - David Charles Alexander Cockburn
      - Susan Elinor Cockburn
    - Henry Dundas Cockburn (Brentford, London, 1913 – 4 December 1998), Medical Superintendent at the Royal London Hospital, London
    - Elinor Phyllis Cockburn (Brentford, London, 1915 – ?)
  - Jane Cockburn (Bengal, c. 1868 – ?)
  - Margaret G. Cockburn (Bengal, c. 1870 – ?)
  - Gertrude C. Cockburn (Germany, c. 1875 – ?)
- Elizabeth Cockburn (Edinburgh, Midlothian, 30 June 1826 – 6 April 1908), married in Edinburgh, Midlothian, on 27 December 1848 to Thomas Cleghorn FRSE (Edinburgh, Midlothian, 3 March 1818 – 18 June 1874), a practising Advocate, who rose to be Sheriff of Argyle.
- Johanna Richardson Cockburn (Edinburgh, Midlothian, 14 January 1831 – 1888), married in Edinburgh, Midlothian, on 21 October 1856 to her cousin Archibald David Cockburn (Edinburgh, Midlothian, 6 September 1826 – 1886), son of John Cockburn and wife Eliza Dewar, and had issue

The authors Alec Waugh and Evelyn Waugh, the journalist Claud Cockburn, Claudia Cockburn (wife of actor Michael Flanders) and author Sarah Caudwell were all descended from Cockburn, as are journalists Laura Flanders, Stephanie Flanders, Alexander Cockburn (husband of author Emma Tennant), Andrew Cockburn (husband of journalist Leslie Cockburn) and Patrick Cockburn (son-in-law of Bishop Hugh Montefiore) and actress Olivia Wilde (former wife of Tao Ruspoli).

== Death and legacy ==
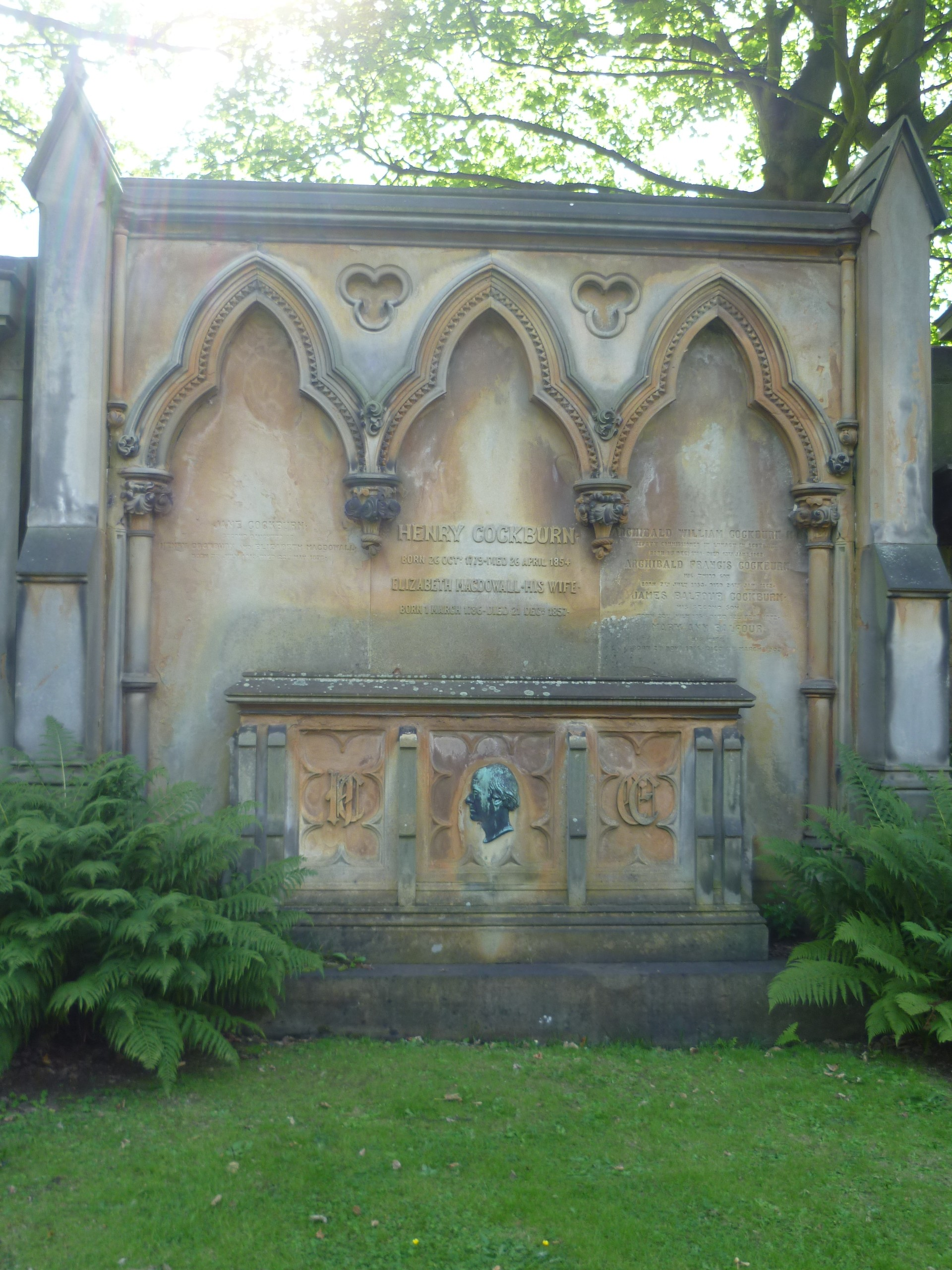
Cockburn's grave in the Dean Cemetery

Cockburn died on 26 April 1854, at his mansion of Bonaly, near Edinburgh and is buried in the city's Dean Cemetery. A statue of him by local sculptor William Brodie stands in the north-east corner of Parliament Hall.

Cockburn Street, built in the 1850s to connect the High Street with the North British Railway's Waverley station, is also named after him. The building at the foot of the street, formerly the "Cockburn Hotel", bears his image in profile in a stone above the entrance.

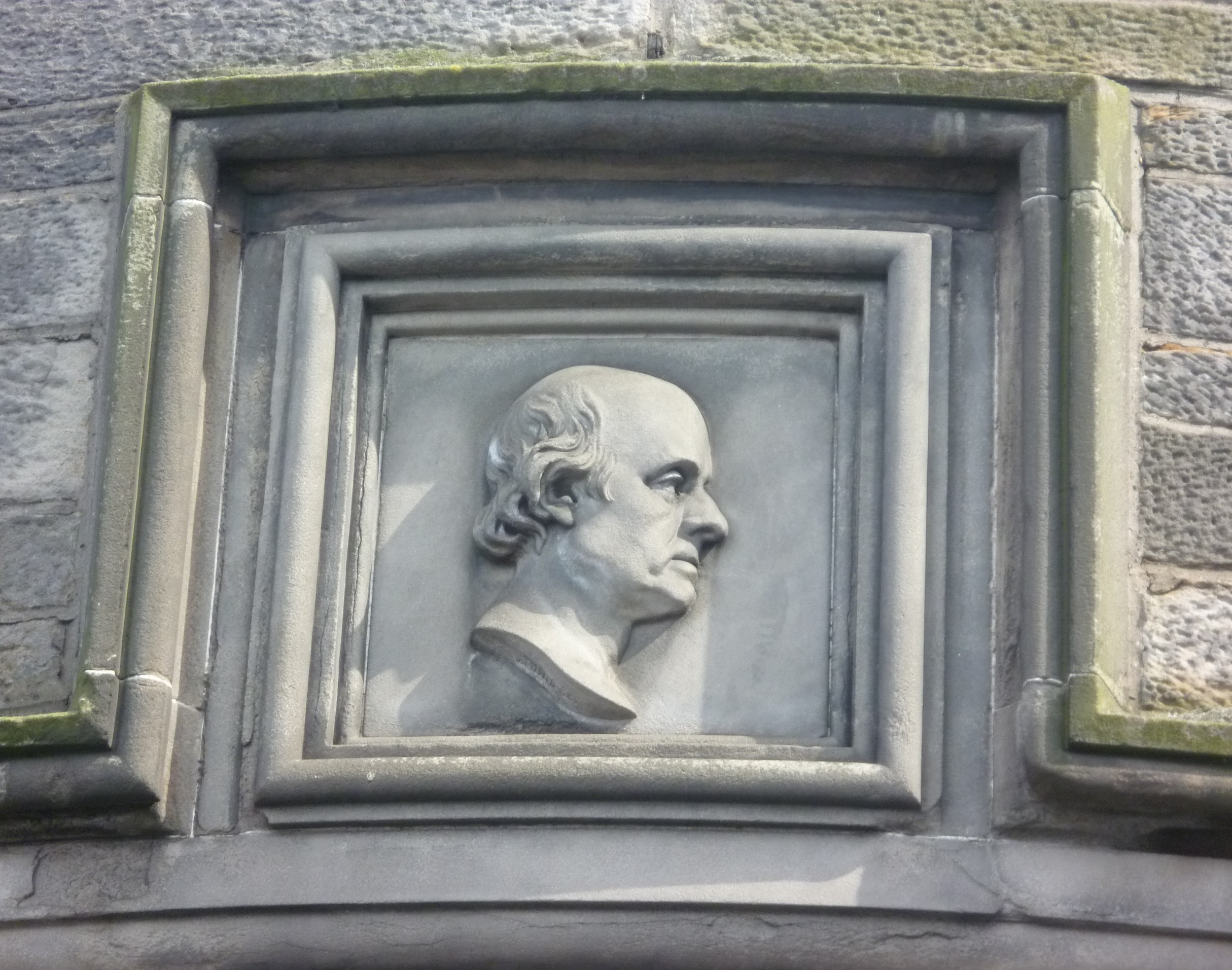
Cockburn depicted on a building in Cockburn Street, Edinburgh

Cockburn had an interest in architectural conservation, particularly in Edinburgh, where several important historic buildings such as John Knox House and Tailor's Hall in the Cowgate owe their continued existence to the change in attitude towards conservation which he helped bring about. The Cockburn Association (Edinburgh Civic Trust), founded in 1875, was named in his honour.

Cockburn was played by Russell Hunter in Cocky, a one-man play which was effectively a dramatisation of his memoirs, broadcast on BBC Scotland. It ended with his closing speech to the jury in the Burke and Hare trial.

Legal offices
Preceded by John Hope	Solicitor General for Scotland; 1830–1834	Succeeded by Andrew Skene
Academic offices
Preceded by The Marquess of Lansdowne	Rector of the University of Glasgow; 1831—1834	Succeeded by Lord Stanley
