= Beat the Devil =

Beat the Devil may refer to:

- Beat the Devil (novel), a 1951 thriller written by Claud Cockburn
- Beat the Devil (film), a 1953 film directed by John Huston
- Beat the Devil, a 2002 short film in The Hire series, starring James Brown and Gary Oldman
- Beat the Devil (play), a 2020 book, monologue play, and film written by David Hare
