= Claud Cockburn =

British journalist (1904–1981)

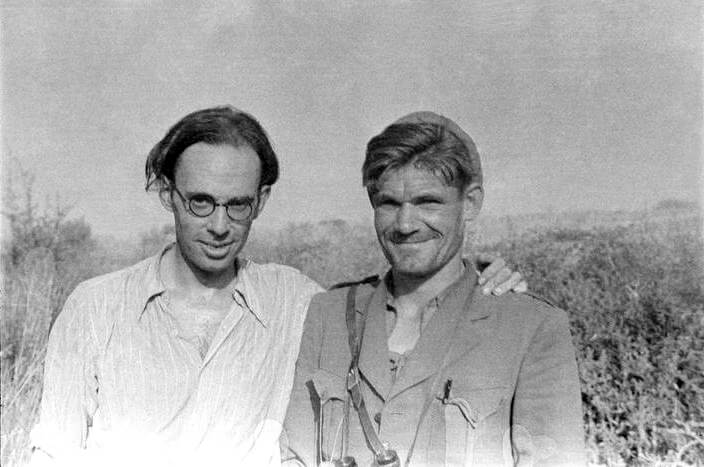
- Born: Francis Claud Cockburn; 12 April 1904; Peking, Qing Empire
- Died: 15 December 1981 (aged 77); Cork, County Cork, Ireland
- Other names: Frank Pitcairn; James Helvick
- Citizenship: British
- Occupations: Journalist and author
- Political party: Communist
- Spouse(s): Hope Hale Davis; Patricia Byron
- Partner: Jean Ross
- Children: Claudia Cockburn; Sarah Caudwell; Alexander Cockburn; Andrew Cockburn; Patrick Cockburn
- Parents: Henry Cockburn (father); Elizabeth Stevenson (mother)
- Relatives: granddaughters: Laura Flanders; Stephanie Flanders; Daisy Cockburn; Olivia Wilde

Francis Claud Cockburn (/ˈkoʊbərn/ KOH-bərn; 12 April 1904 – 15 December 1981) was a British journalist. He helped popularize the saying "believe nothing until it has been officially denied" which is still widely quoted by journalists, although he did not claim to have originated it. He started the newsletter The Week which ran from 1933 to 1941. Later he published a number of books on various topics, both fiction and non-fiction, and a number of autobiographies. His novel Beat the Devil was turned into a film of the same name.

== Early life ==
Cockburn was born in Peking (present-day Beijing), China, on 12 April 1904, the son of Henry Cockburn, a British consul general, and wife Elizabeth Gordon (née Stevenson). His paternal great-grandfather was Scottish judge and writer Henry Cockburn, Lord Cockburn. He was also related to Admiral George Cockburn, the principal architect of the burning of Washington during the War of 1812. Cockburn was sent to his grandmother in Scotland in 1908 along with a Chinese nanny to care for him. Cockburn was educated at Berkhamsted School, Berkhamsted, Hertfordshire, and Keble College, Oxford, graduating with a Bachelor of Arts. At Oxford he was part of the Hypocrites' Club, and edited The Isis Magazine, a student newspaper. In 1927, Cockburn was elected to a Laming Travelling Fellowship at The Queen's College, Oxford, which allowed him to travel in Austria and Germany.

== Early work as a journalist ==
Cockburn became a journalist with the London based newspaper The Times, but lost faith in Capitalism with the Wall Street crash of 1929 and declined a job in the paper's Washington, D.C. news bureau. He quit The Times and joined The Daily Worker, a Communist paper in London. It has been said that during his spell as a sub-editor on The Times, Cockburn and colleagues competed (with a small prize for the winner) to write the dullest printed headline. Cockburn only once claimed the honours, with "Small Earthquake in Chile, Not many dead". No copy of The Times featuring that headline has been located although it finally appeared decades after the recollection in Not the Times, a spoof version of the newspaper produced by several journalists at The Times in 1979 during the paper's year-long absence because of an industrial dispute. He worked as a foreign correspondent in Germany before he resigned in 1933 to start his own newsletter, The Week.

== Spanish Civil War ==
Under the alias Frank Pitcairn, Cockburn contributed to the British communist newspaper, the Daily Worker. In 1936, Harry Pollitt, General Secretary of the Communist Party of Great Britain, asked him to cover the Spanish Civil War. Cockburn joined the Fifth Regiment to report the war as a soldier. While in Spain, he published Reporter in Spain. According to the editor of a volume of his writings on Spain, Cockburn formed a personal relationship with Mikhail Koltsov, "then the foreign editor of Pravda and, in Cockburn's view, 'the confidant and mouthpiece and direct agent of Stalin in Spain'".

Cockburn's reporting in Spain, as "Frank Pitcairn", was heavily criticised by George Orwell in his 1938 memoir Homage to Catalonia. Orwell accused Cockburn of being under the control of Stalinist handlers and was critical of Cockburn's depiction of the Barcelona May Days in which Orwell had taken part and during which anti-Stalinist communists and anarchists were caught and executed by operatives of the Soviet NKVD. Specifically, to undermine anti-Stalinist factions on the Republican side, Cockburn falsely reported that the anti-Stalinist figurehead Andrés Nin, who had been tortured and executed by the NKVD, was alive and well after escaping to fascist territory.

According to writer Adam Hochschild, Cockburn functioned as Stalinist propagandist during the war "on [Communist] Party orders". In one instance, Cockburn claimed to have been an eyewitness to a battle that he totally invented. This hoax was intended to persuade the French prime minister that Francisco Franco's forces were weaker than they appeared and thus make the Republicans seem worthier candidates for help in obtaining arms. The ruse worked, and the French border was opened for a previously-stalled artillery shipment.

== World War II ==
In the late 1930s, Cockburn's The Week was highly critical of Neville Chamberlain. Cockburn said in the 1960s that much of the information in The Week had been leaked to him by Sir Robert Vansittart, Permanent Under-Secretary at the Foreign Office.

At the same time, Cockburn said that the Security Service (MI5) was spying on him because of The Week, although the British historian D. C. Watt argued that it was more likely that it was the police Special Branch of Scotland Yard, which was less experienced in that work than MI5. However, MI5 was involved since a 1940 Security Service file on Cockburn was later made public which called Cockburn "a leading British Communist Party member and was said to be a leader of the Comintern in Western Europe", and Claud's son Patrick Cockburn applied for his MI5 files and received 24 volumes of them. Cockburn was an opponent of appeasement before the Molotov–Ribbentrop Pact. In a November 1937 article in The Week, Cockburn coined the term "Cliveden set" to describe what he alleged to be an upper-class pro-German group including Lord Halifax and Lady Astor who supposedly exercised influence behind the scenes, although modern scholars dispute his claims. The claims were picked up by other left-wing presses, but Cockburn later admitted he had made it up and that the alleged conspirators "would not have known a plot if you handed it to them on a skewer".

Watt alleges the information printed in The Week included rumours which often suited Moscow's interests and were even supplied by the Soviets. Watt used as an example the claim The Week made in February–March 1939 that German troops were concentrating in Klagenfurt for an invasion of Yugoslavia, which Watt says had no basis in reality. According to author Adrian Fort, Cockburn "considered rumours to be just as valid as facts." Journalist Richard Ingrams wrote of Cockburn, "He pooh-poohed the notion of facts as if they were nuggets of gold waiting to be unearthed. It was, he believed, the inspiration of the journalist which supplied the story. Speculation, rumour, even guesswork, were all part of the process and an inspired phrase was worth reams of cautious analysis."

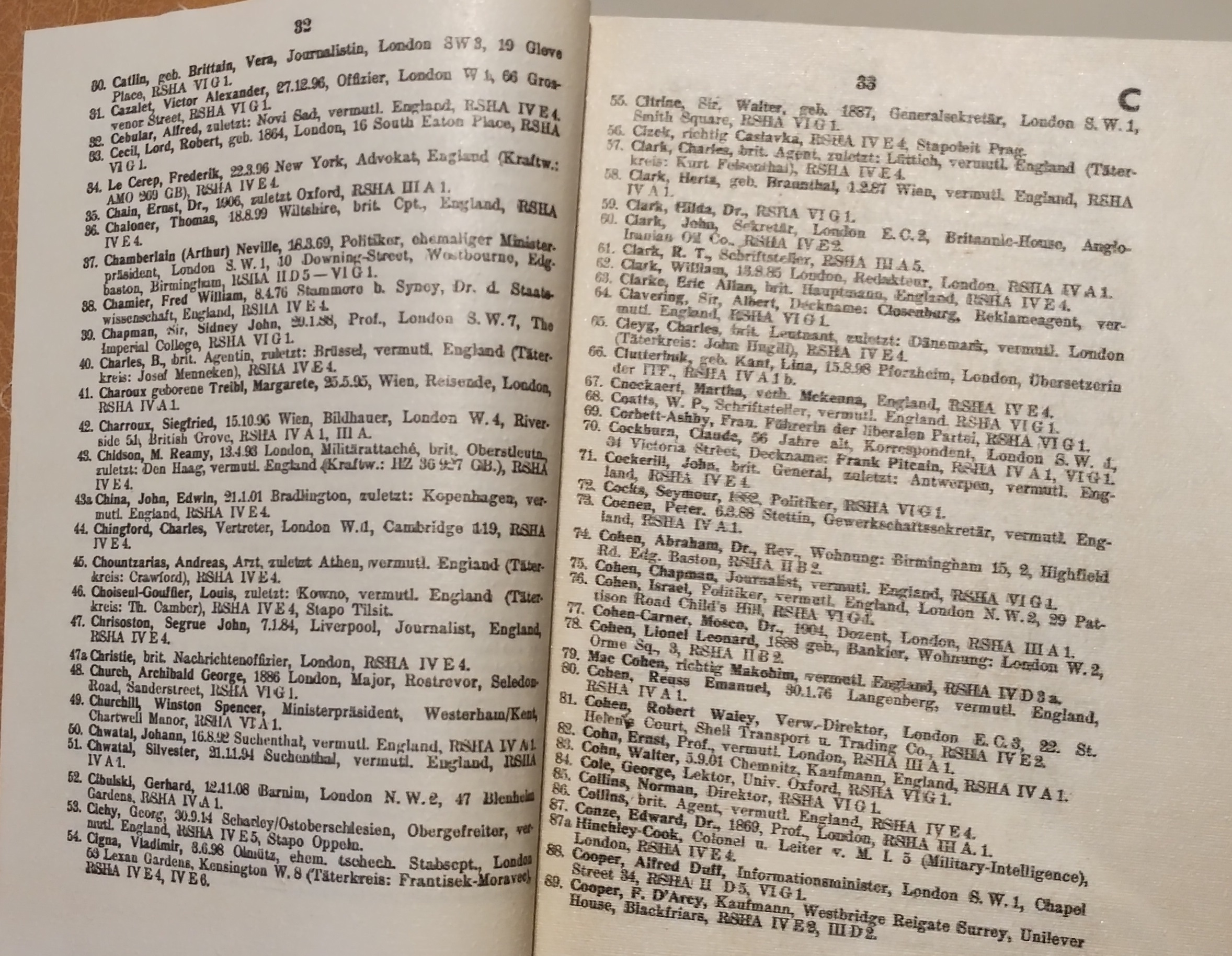
Pages 32 and 33 of The Black Book; Cockburn being #70, with his name and other name misspelled.

The Week was banned for attacking the war effort and for its Soviet ties, along with Cockburn's old employer The Daily Worker, and ceased publication in 1941 shortly after the war began. Both papers were allowed to resume publication once the Soviet Union became allied with the British however.

When the Nazi German The Black Book came to light after the war, had the Germans invaded Britain, Cockburn was scheduled to be arrested and placed into the custody of the Amt IV (Gestapo).

== Post-war activities ==
In 1947, Cockburn moved to Ireland and lived at Ardmore, County Waterford. He continued to contribute to newspapers and journals, including a weekly column for The Irish Times. There he famously stated, "Wherever there is a stink in international affairs, you will find that Henry Kissinger has recently visited".

Among his novels were Beat the Devil (originally under the pseudonym James Helvick), The Horses, Ballantyne's Folly, and Jericho Road. Beat the Devil was made into a film in 1953 by the director John Huston, who paid Cockburn £3,000 for the rights to the book and screenplay. Cockburn collaborated with Huston on the early drafts of the script, but the credit went to Truman Capote. The title was later used by Cockburn's son Alexander for his regular column in The Nation. He also wrote Mr. Mintoff Comes to Ireland. The book was published in 1975 but set in 1980 when Dom Mintoff was Malta's Prime Minister and leader of the Malta Labour Party. The cover description describes it as a "shrewd assessment of how a small independent nation may best stand up to the so-called Great Powers".

He published nonfiction works such as Aspects of English History (1957), Bestseller (1972), The Devil's Decade (1973), and Union Power (1976); as well as a number of autobiographical works. His first volume of memoirs was published as In Time of Trouble (1956) in the United Kingdom and as A Discord of Trumpets in the United States. It was followed by Crossing the Line (1958), and A View from the West (1961). Revised, they were published by Penguin as I, Claud in 1967. Again revised and shortened, with a new chapter, they were republished as Cockburn Sums Up shortly before he died. Cockburn in Spain: Despatches from the Spanish Civil War was published posthumously. Cockburn also contributed to various periodicals including Punch Magazine, Private Eye, and The Irish Times.

Cockburn died on 15 December 1981 at St. Finbarr's Hospital in Cork, Ireland at the age of 77.

== Personal life ==
He was the second cousin, once removed, of the novelists Alec Waugh and Evelyn Waugh. He lived at Brook Lodge, Youghal, County Cork, Ireland.

Claud Cockburn married twice, and all of his wives and partners were also journalists. Cockburn married Hope Hale Davis in 1932, but they purportedly did not live together and divorced in 1934 when Cockburn abandoned Davis while she was pregnant with their child Claudia. He had another child, Sarah, with his domestic partner Jean Ross. Although Ross changed her last name to Cockburn in a deed poll, Claud was still married under British law to Davis and hence he could not legally marry Ross at the time. In 1940, he married his final wife Patricia Byron, daughter of Major John Bernard Arbuthnot and Olive Blake, and had three children with her: Alexander, Andrew, and Patrick. Cockburn's three sons all became journalists: Alexander, who moved to the US, wrote for Village Voice, The Nation and CounterPunch; Andrew became the Washington editor of Harper's Magazine; and Patrick wrote for the Financial Times and The Independent, and he also published a biography of his father.

Cockburn's granddaughters include RadioNation host Laura Flanders, ex-BBC Economics editor Stephanie Flanders, and actress Olivia Wilde.

== Legacy ==
Cockburn helped popularize the saying "believe nothing until it has been officially denied" which is still widely quoted by journalists, although he did not claim to have originated it. In his autobiography In Time of Trouble, he refers to the phrase as advice he had "often heard".

Cockburn's son Patrick Cockburn published a biography of his father, Believe Nothing Until It Is Officially Denied: Claud Cockburn and the Invention of Guerrilla Journalism, in 2024.

== Selected works ==
- Reporter in Spain (1936)
- Beat the Devil (1951)
- Overdraft on Glory (1955)
- Nine Bald Men (1956)
- In Time of Trouble: An Autobiography (1956; published as A Discord of Trumpets in the United States)
- Aspects of English History (1957)
- Crossing the Line: Being the Second Volume of Autobiography (1958)
- View from the West: Being the Third Volume of Autobiography (1961)
- The Horses (1961)
- I, Claud: Memoirs of a Subversive (1967)
- Ballantyne's Folly (1970)
- Bestseller: The Books That Everyone Read, 1900-1939 (1972)
- The Devil's Decade: The Thirties (1973)
- Jericho Road (1974)
- Mr. Mintoff Comes to Ireland (1975)
- Union Power: The Growth and Challenge in Perspective (1976)
- Cockburn Sums Up: An Autobiography (1981)
- Cockburn in Spain: Despatches from the Spanish Civil War (1986)
