= Uniform of The Royal High School, Edinburgh =

The school uniform is black and white, derived from the municipal colours of Edinburgh.

The school retains the now traditional uniform of a blazer and tie. Boys are required to wear a plain white shirt, official tie, black blazer with school badge, black trousers and black polished leather school shoes. There is the option of a black pullover. Girls must wear a white blouse, official tie, black pullover or cardigan, black blazer with school badge, black skirt or trousers, black tights and black polished leather school shoes. A black and white striped tie is standard; a plain black tie denotes a Sixth Year.

The school badge features the school motto and the embattled triple-towered castle of the school arms. Prefects and Vice Captains are presented with a silver badge whilst the School Captain is presented with a gold badge to pin on his or her blazer. A select few 5th-formers are also awarded a Prefect badge.

When full colours are awarded to a pupil a new pocket is attached to the blazer with the school emblem embroidered in silver wire with the dates of the present academic year either side of the badge.

These dress regulations, which were introduced to include those for girls as well as boys, date from 1973.

The school garb worn at the end of the eighteenth century is described by Lord Cockburn:

It consisted of a round black hat; a shirt fastened at the neck by a black ribbon, and except on dress-days, unruffled; a cloth waistcoat, rather large, with two rows of buttons and of buttonholes, so that it could be buttoned on either side, which, when one side got dirty, was convenient; a single-breasted jacket, which in due time got a tail and became a coat; brown corduroy breeches, tied at the knees by a brown cotton tape; worsted stockings in winter, blue cotton stockings in summer, and white cotton for dress; clumsy shoes, made to be used on either foot, and each requiring to be used on alternative feet daily; brass or copper buckles. The coat and waistcoat were always of glaring colours, such as bright blue, grass green, and scarlet. I remember well the pride with which I was once rigged out in a scarlet waistcoat, and a bright green coat.

Clothing patterns were gradually standardised from the 1860s, and an outfitter, Aitken & Niven, was appointed for the school after 1905. The blazer became part of the regular uniform in the early 1930s. The school badge was introduced in 1921, superseding an intertwined monogram RHS in silver thread on a black school cap, which had been standard wear since the turn of the twentieth century. The cap became a casualty of the clothes rationing and wartime austerity of the 1940s, since when pupils have gone bareheaded. Long trousers replaced shorts by the 1970s.

Like the uniform, the school sports colours are black and white. They were adopted from the city in 1875. Prior to 1866 the sports colours were white with an orange scarf; between 1866 and 1869, white with a blue and orange scarf; between 1869 and 1871, blue and orange; and between 1871 and 1875, scarlet and blue. This rapid mid-Victorian evolution was prompted by the innovation of annual games.
