= Patricia Cockburn =

Irish writer, traveller, conchologist, and artis (1914–1989)

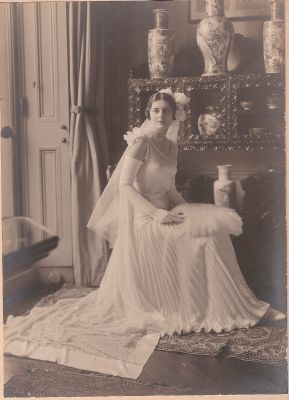
- Wedding photo, c. 1940
- Born: Patricia Evangeline Anne Arbuthnot; 17 March 1914; Derry House, Rosscarbery, County Cork, Ireland
- Died: 6 October 1989 (aged 75); Mercy University Hospital, Cork, Ireland
- Resting place: Collegiate Church of St Mary Youghal
- Notable work: The years of The Week (1968), Figure of eight (1985)
- Spouses: Arthur Byron (m. 1933; div. 1939) Claud Cockburn (m. 1940; died 1981)
- Children: Alexander; Andrew; Patrick
- Parent: John Bernard Arbuthnot
- Relatives: Henry Arthur Blake (grandfather); Edith Osborne (grandmother); Olivia Wilde (granddaughter)

Patricia Evangeline Anne Cockburn (née Arbuthnot, later Byron; 17 March 1914 – 6 October 1989) was an Irish writer, traveler, conchologist and artist. She was best known for her journalism and her later artistic career, creating shell pictures.

== Early life ==
Patricia Cockburn was born Patricia Evangeline Anne Arbuthnot on 17 March 1914 at Derry House, Rosscarbery, County Cork. She was the youngest of the six children of Major John Bernard Arbuthnot and Olive Blake, daughter of Lady Edith Blake and Sir Henry Arthur Blake. Her father served in the Scots Guards during World War I. The family inherited the Blake fortune through Olive once her brothers were cut out of her parents' will. In 1916, the family moved in with Lady Blake at Myrtle Grove, Youghal. The Arbuthnots moved to London in 1918, leaving Cockburn to live with her grandmother. Whilsein Myrtle Grove received no formal education, spending her time horseback riding. She joined her parents in London in 1922 to start school. When she was in London, she was a witness to the murder of Sir Henry Wilson, 1st Baronet.

Cockburn was unhappy at school and missed her life in the countryside. She stopped eating, inspired by Terence MacSwiney, and was returned to Cork with a governess. After the death of Lady Blake in 1926, her parents returned to Myrtle Grove but did not live there continuously. Cockburn remained there, ceasing her school lessons at 14 to concentrate on her horse riding. On her 16th birthday, however, she was thrown from a horse and broke her back. During her recovery, she moved to Algiers, living with Clare Sheridan. Upon returning to London in 1931, Cockburn made her debut as a debutante and started her studies at the Westminster School of Art. Later in life, she reflected that she "was no Michelangelo", which led to her switching her course to study design.

It was while studying that Cockburn met Lloyd's underwriter, Arthur Byron. The couple married on 10 October 1933, which led to Cockburn leaving her artistic studies. The couple lived briefly in Clarendon Place, Bayswater before taking a world tour. When the couple returned to London in 1936, Cockburn gave birth to a son, Darrell.

== Career and family ==
Cockburn accepted a brief from the Royal Geographical Society to compile an etymological report on the dialects of central Africa. The couple left their son with her parents and travelled to the Ituri Rainforest. She constructed a language map by meeting different tribes. She was not a linguist, but instead used observation and pragmatism. Her photographs were exhibited in London. Having returned to London, Cockburn was preparing to rejoin her son in Cork when Darrell had an accident that resulted in blood poisoning. She suffered a period of depression from the grief and guilt over her son's death.

Her next commission came from the Evening Standard in early 1939, when she wrote a series of articles on the newly independent Ruthenia. By this time, her marriage to Byron was over, with the couple divorcing in 1939. When she returned to London, she met and fell in love with Claud Cockburn. Her parents objected to the relationship and cut her off when she married him in 1940. When she fell pregnant, her parents resumed contact, but it is not clear why they reinstated her allowance. In contrast to her early life, she and Claud often struggled for money throughout their marriage.

While her husband travelled, Cockburn edited his newspaper, The Week in 1945. Cockburn grew tired of London, and in 1947, the family returned to Cork, where her brother and parents were living. Having initially lived in Myrtle Grove, the Cockburns moved into Brook Lodge, a Georgian house nearby. As the house was practically derelict, they rented it for a nominal fee. Cockburn installed a cesspit and created a garden, as well as schooling ponies she purchased from Travellers and sold on to buyers in England. She published her first book in 1968, The Years of the Week, about her husband's paper.

== Later life ==
Cockburn returned to art as a career later in life. She began making shell pictures, a form of art that had been popular in the 18th century but had fallen out of fashion. Encouraged by her friends, Desmond Guinness and Norah McGuinness, Cockburn took it up professionally, exhibiting in Ireland and New York.

When the lease on Brook Lodge ended in 1980, the Cockburns moved to a smaller property in Ardmore, County Waterford. Claud died in 1981, and Cockburn lived in Ardmore for the rest of her life. She became president of the local chapter of the Irish Countrywomen's Association. She published her memoir, Figure of Eight, in 1985. Cockburn died on 6 October 1989 at Mercy University Hospital, Cork, from cancer. She was buried beside her husband in the graveyard of the Collegiate Church of St Mary Youghal, under a tree planted by her mother in memory of her brother. All three of the Cockburns' sons became journalists: Alexander, Andrew, and Patrick. Through Andrew, she was the paternal grandmother of actress Olivia Wilde.
