= Claudia Cockburn =

American-British disability activist (1933–1998)

- Born: 11 February 1933; New York City, US
- Died: 25 June 1998 (aged 65); London, England
- Occupation: Activist
- Spouse: Michael Flanders
- Children: Laura Flanders; Stephanie Flanders
- Parent(s): Claud Cockburn; Hope Hale Davis
- Relatives: Sarah Caudwell (paternal half-sister); Alexander Cockburn (paternal half-brother); Andrew Cockburn (paternal half-brother); Patrick Cockburn (paternal half-brother); Lydia Davis (maternal half-sister); Olivia Wilde (niece)

Claudia Cockburn Flanders, OBE (11 February 1933 – 25 June 1998) was an American-British disability activist who spent much of her working life in the United Kingdom.

Her parents were Claud Cockburn, a journalist, and Hope Hale Davis. She married singer-songwriter Michael Flanders in 1959. Her stepmother, by her father's remarriage, was Jean Ross, the reported inspiration for Christopher Isherwood's iconic character Sally Bowles. Through her father, she was the half-sister of mystery writer Sarah Caudwell, Ross's daughter, Irish journalists Alexander, Andrew and Patrick Cockburn, and paternal aunt of actress Olivia Wilde (née Cockburn), including Wilde's siblings. Through her mother, she was the half-sister of the American writer Lydia Davis.

In 1987, Flanders formed Tripscope, an organisation to help disabled people with transportation difficulties. She created the post of adviser on disability to the National Bus Company (UK) in the 1970s and served for many years on the national Joint Committee on Mobility for Disabled People and the Department of Transport Advisory Committee on Disability in the UK. She was awarded an OBE in 1981 for her services to disabled people.

== Death ==
She died in London on 25 June 1998, aged 65. Her daughters are the journalists Laura and Stephanie Flanders.

In 1999, a special award for improved accessibility for UK buses operators was started in her memory under the UK Bus Awards.

== See also ==
- Hope Hale Davis
