= Henry's Demons =

2011 book by Patrick Cockburn

First edition (US)

Henry’s Demons: Living with Schizophrenia, A Father and Son’s Story is a 2011 book by Patrick Cockburn in collaboration with his son Henry Cockburn, published by Simon & Schuster in the UK and by Scribner in the US.

== Content ==
Patrick Cockburn's son Henry was diagnosed with schizophrenia at the age of 20 whilst studying art at Brighton University. His first psychotic breakdown had occurred in 2002, after he nearly drowned whilst trying to swim the estuary at Newhaven. He was sectioned at the beginning of 2003 and then spent the majority of the next seven years held in mental hospitals (during that period he escaped from his custody on approximately thirty different occasions). Since that period he has now left mental hospitals and at the time that the book was written was moving into more independent living quarters in Herne Bay.

Cockburn explores the subjective experience of being diagnosed with schizophrenia and the effect that it has on family and friends. He also examines the wider questions that are raised by a case such as Henry's, with a discussion of the vexed issues that accompany particular mental health diagnoses and classifications, the state of the contemporary law in relation to such cases and the history of disorders themselves and the treatments that are applied to them. Patrick Cockburn's wife Jan's diary extracts from the period are also included in the book.

Henry's perspective is also discussed; he is able to remember the real life situations he was in as well as the hallucinatory visions that accompanied them, and sees the whole experience of schizophrenia as being a matter of 'awakening' as much as an illness or disorder, and has been resistant to the use of anti-psychotic medication because he did not want to take drugs that affected his consciousness (though it is also pointed out that he had used cannabis from a young age, raising wider questions about the link between use of the drug and the disorder).

One wider social concern that emerges from the analysis in the book is that we have not yet collectively created the kind of community-based mechanisms and environments for mental health recovery and renaissance that might be paralleled with the original development of the mental hospitals in the nineteenth century.

Henry's case is broadly positive given the signs of rehabilitation, though there are many questions over the long-term situation in a case such as his which are raised by the book as a whole.
