= Henry Cockburn (consul) =

Indian politician

Henry Cockburn CB (2 March 1859 – 19 March 1927) was a British diplomat.

== Family ==
Cockburn was born in Calcutta in 1859. He was a son of Francis Jeffrey Cockburn (Edinburgh, Midlothian, 8 January 1825 – Brentford, London, 10 July 1893), a Judge in India and with the Bengal Civil Service, and wife (Calcutta or Westbury, Tasmania, 25 January 1855) Elizabeth Anne (Eliza Ann) Pitcairn (Hobart, Tasmania, 23 September 1831, bap. Hobart, Tasmania, 7 November 1831 – Wycombe, Oxfordshire, 1923). His paternal grandparents were Henry Cockburn, Lord Cockburn, and his wife Elizabeth Macdowall, while his maternal grandparents were Robert Pitcairn (Edinburgh, Midlothian, 17 July 1802 – Hobart, Tasmania, 1868) (son of David Pitcairn and Mary Henderson) and his wife (m. Hobart, Tasmania, 30 September 1830) Dorothy/Dorothea Jessy Dumas.

Claud Cockburn, the journalist, was his son and the journalists Alexander Cockburn, Andrew Cockburn and Patrick Cockburn are his grandsons.

== Biography ==
Cockburn served in China for 25 years from 1880 as British Consul-General to Beijing and Vice-Consul in Chongqing, China. In late 1901, Cockburn was appointed to assist Sir James Lyle Mackay, who had been appointed His Majesty's Special Commissioner to conduct negotiations with representatives of China, The negotiations resulted in the Sino-British "Mackay Treaty," which anticipated the abolition of extraterritoriality in China.

In 1905, Cockburn was appointed Consul-General in Seoul, Korea, at the beginning of the Japanese occupation.

He was invested as a Companion of the Order of the Bath.

== Marriage and issue ==
He married at Totlands Bay, Hampshire, on 9 October 1899 Elizabeth Gordon Stevenson (India Office, Bengal, 11 October 1862, bap. Moulmein, Bengal, 5 November 1862 –?), daughter of Colonel James Francis John Stevenson (bap. Portsmouth, Hampshire, 8 January 1823 – at sea, 7 December 1873) (son of Robert Charles Stevenson and wife Alicia Maria Groves/Gronbe) and wife (m. Kilmonivaig, Inverness-shire, 19 September 1850) and wife Louisa Cameron Ross (Kilmonivaig, Inverness-shire, 12 October 1829 – ?) (daughter of Ewen Ross and wife (Kilmallie, Argyll, 3 January 1827) Frances "Fanny" Cameron), by whom he had one daughter and one son:

- Louise Margaret Cockburn (China, 16 September 1900 –?), married to George Raleigh Parkin, and had two daughters:
  - Elizabeth Stevenson Parkin (25 December 1928), married to Omar Shakespear Pound (Paris, 10 September 1926 – Princeton, Mercer County, New Jersey, 2 March 2010), and had issue
  - Jane Parkin (between 8 February 1934 and 1935)
- Francis Claud Cockburn of Brook Lodge, Youghal, County Cork, Munster, Ireland (Beijing, 12 April 1904 – 15 December 1981)

He died in Tring in 1927.
