= The Week (1933) =

Radical British newspaper edited by Claud Cockburn

- Owner: Claud Cockburn
- Editor: Claud Cockburn
- Founded: March 29, 1933
- Ceased publication: 1941
- Political alignment: Communism
- Language: English

The Week was a British newspaper published from 1933 until 1941, and was described by its founder and sole employee Claud Cockburn as an "extreme left-wing news sheet". It was supportive of Communism, and was in turn supported by the Soviets, but known for speaking out against right-wing fascist dictators, particularly Hitler and Mussolini. The paper quickly became popular for its sensational stories, often based on rumours or conjecture, until it was banned in 1941 for its Soviet ties.

== History ==
Marxist journalist Claud Cockburn, who had previously worked for the Soviet-sponsored paper The Daily Worker and The Times, launched the first British publication known as The Week as a newsletter on 29 March 1933, after he had returned from reporting on Germany. It focused on the rise of fascism. Jessica Mitford in A Fine Old Conflict attributed the journal's influence to its use of undercover sources. It quickly became popular for publishing sensational stories other newspapers were not willing to print. The editor of the New Statesman for instance, Kingsley Martin, said he had already heard rumours of some things Cockburn reported, but couldn't confirm them so he couldn't print them as fact like Cockburn did.

In the late 1930s, The Week was highly critical of Neville Chamberlain and his policy of appeasement. Cockburn was an opponent of appeasement before the Molotov–Ribbentrop Pact of 1939. In a November 1937 article in The Week, Cockburn coined the term "Cliveden set" to describe what he alleged to be an upper-class pro-German group including Lord Halifax and Lady Astor who supposedly exercised influence behind the scenes, although modern scholars dispute his claim. The claims were picked up by other left-wing presses, but Cockburn later admitted he had made it up and that the alleged conspirators "would not have known a plot if you handed it to them on a skewer".

At the same time, Cockburn claimed that MI5 was spying on him because of The Week; but the British historian D.C. Watt considered that it was more likely that, if anyone was spying on Cockburn, it would have been the Special Branch of Scotland Yard, who were less experienced in this work than MI5.

Watt alleges that the information printed in The Week included rumours which often suited Moscow's interests and were even supplied by the Soviets. Watt used as an example the claim The Week made in February–March 1939 that German troops were concentrating in Klagenfurt for an invasion of Yugoslavia, which Watt says had no basis in reality. According to author Adrian Fort, Cockburn "considered rumours to be just as valid as facts." Journalist Richard Ingrams wrote of Cockburn, "He pooh-poohed the notion of facts as if they were nuggets of gold waiting to be unearthed. It was, he believed, the inspiration of the journalist which supplied the story. Speculation, rumour, even guesswork, were all part of the process and an inspired phrase was worth reams of cautious analysis."

The Week was banned for attacking the war effort and for its Soviet ties, along with Cockburn's old employer The Daily Worker, and ceased publication in 1941 shortly after the war began. Both papers were allowed to resume publication once the Soviet Union became allied with the British however.

Cockburn maintained in the 1960s that much of the information in The Week was leaked to him by Sir Robert Vansittart, the Permanent Under-Secretary of the Foreign Office.

== See also ==
- Muckraking
- Yellow journalism
