= Ken Silverstein =

American journalist

- Born: August 12, 1958 (age 68); Saint Louis, Missouri, US
- Education: Evergreen State College (BA)
- Occupation: Journalist
- Known for: Founder of CounterPunch
- Children: 2
- Website: www.washingtonbabylondc.com

Ken Silverstein is an American journalist who worked for the Los Angeles Times as an investigative reporter, for the Associated Press in Brazil, and has written for Mother Jones, Washington Monthly, The Nation, Slate, and Salon and Harper's Magazine.

== Biography ==
Silverstein was born on August 12, 1958, in Saint Louis, Missouri. In 1982, he graduated with a B.A. from Evergreen State College. From 1987 to 1989, he worked as an editorial assistant at The Nation. From 1989 to 1993, he worked as a correspondent for the Associated Press in Rio de Janeiro, Brazil. In 1993, he returned to the United States and founded the newsletter CounterPunch in his home in Washington D.C. In 1996, he left Counterpunch leaving Alexander Cockburn and Jeffrey St. Clair as editors. From 1993 to 2003, he worked as a freelance writer as well as a contributing editor of Harper's Magazine, Washington editor of Mother Jones, and contributing writer for The Nation, Salon.com, Slate, The American Prospect and Washington Monthly. In 2003, he accepted a position as the Washington bureau reporter for the Los Angeles Times.

He drew attention in 2007 for a report in which he went undercover as part of an investment group with business interests in Turkmenistan, raising questions about journalistic ethics. Silverstein said that he could not have exposed the willingness of the companies to work with a Stalinist dictatorship using conventional journalism methods.

In September 2010, Silverstein left his position as Washington editor and blogger at Harper's Magazine and remained a contributing editor.

He is a self-described "vole" in the newspaper business, and an opponent of what he considers "false 'balance'" in the news media. Silverstein previously wrote a regular column for Harper's Magazine, called Washington Babylon. His last column was in September 2010. Silverstein was also Washington editor for Harper's.

In December 2013, Silverstein was hired as senior investigative reporter by First Look Media. In November 2014, Silverstein began writing for First Look's The Intercept. There, Silverstein sparked some controversy for an article critical of the popular NPR podcast, Serial.

In February 2015, Silverstein announced his resignation from The Intercept in a series of Facebook posts calling his former employers a "pathetic joke". Expressing anger and disillusionment towards the company, Silverstein stated, "I am one of many employees who was hired under what were essentially false pretenses; we were told we would be given all the financial and other support we needed to do independent, important journalism, but instead found ourselves blocked at every step of the way by management's incompetence and bad faith."

Silverstein launched the website Washington Babylon in 2016, for which he is editor-in-chief. The site is named after his previous column at Harper's and the 1996 book he co-wrote with journalist Alexander Cockburn. Silverstein said his goal for Washington Babylon is "to cover DC politicians and journalists like Hollywood celebrities – not the way they are worshiped by our current media masters."

== Personal life ==
Silverstein has 2 children. He is a Jew.

== Bibliography ==
=== Books ===
- Washington Babylon, Verso Books, 1996 (co-authored with Alexander Cockburn)
- Private Warriors, Verso Books, 2000
- Washington on $10 Million A Day: How Lobbyists Plunder the Nation, Common Courage Press, 2002
- The Radioactive Boy Scout: The True Story of a Boy and His Backyard Nuclear Reactor, Random House, 2004
- Turkmeniscam: How Washington Lobbyists Fought to Flack for a Stalinist Dictatorship, Random House, 2008
- The Secret World of Oil, Verso, 2014
