= The Sirens Sang of Murder =

1989 book written by Sarah Caudwell

- First edition (UK)
- Author: Sarah Caudwell
- Genre: Mystery fiction, Crime, Thriller
- Published: 1989
- Publisher: Delacorte Press (US); Collins Crime Club (UK)
- Pages: 277
- Awards: Anthony Award for Best Novel (1990)
- ISBN: 978-0-440-20745-0

The Sirens Sang of Murder is a book written by Sarah Caudwell and published by Delacorte Press on 1 October 1989. It won the Anthony Award for Best Novel in 1990.
