= Mackay Treaty =

1902 treaty between the United Kingdom and China

The Mackay Treaty (Chinese: 中英續議通商行船條約) was a sixteen article treaty signed by the governments of the United Kingdom and the Chinese Qing dynasty on 5 September 1902. Under the terms of the treaty, the likin system of taxation was abolished and the first moves made to abolish extraterritoriality for foreign nationals.

== Background ==
The treaty with the British as well as those that the Qing signed with, the US and Japan, between 1902 and 1903 arose from Article 11 of the 1901 Final Protocol for the Settlement of the Disturbances of 1900 also known as the "Boxer Protocol", which stated that "The Chinese Government has agreed to negotiate the amendments deemed necessary by the foreign governments to the treaties of commerce and navigation and the other subjects concerning commercial relations, with the object of facilitating them." These were the last treaties signed by the Qing before the 1911 fall of the dynasty.

== Negotiating teams ==
The Chinese delegation comprised Lü Haihuan (1840–1927), president of the Board of Public Works and Sheng Xuanhuai (1844–1916), director general of the Chinese Railway Company, assisted by attachés A. E. Hippisley and F. E. Taylor, who were commissioners in the Chinese Maritime Customs Service (CMCS). R.E. Bredon, the CMCS deputy inspector general, later joined the team as an assistant delegate.

On the British side, James Mackay (later the first Lord Inchcape) led the delegation assisted by Shanghai merchant Charles J. Dudgeon and Beijing legation secretary Henry Cockburn.

Negotiations commenced on 11 January 1902 and concluded on 5 September the same year. Unlike the previous treaties of Nanking (1842) and Tientsin (1858), the Mackay Treaty was not a document drawn up by a foreign power for rubber stamping by Qing officials. Instead, the Chinese delegation tried hard to leverage advantage for their side and were aware of the impact of foreign initiatives on both domestic and foreign taxation policies.

== Structure ==
The abolition of the likin tax system and recompense for its loss formed the main thrust of the sixteen article treaty and its three annexes. This was a primary income source for both provincial and county level governments across China and a subject of keen interest to the Foreign Ministry as well as to the Governor-general of Huguang Zhang Zhidong and Liu Kunyi, the Governor-general of Liangjiang. Despite its importance as a source of revenue, forty years of abuse of the likin system by local powers rankled with both the Chinese and the foreign merchant community. To compensate for its loss, the Qing regime increased import duties to 12.5% ad valorem while export duties increased to 7.5%. To maintain an equitable balance, previous internal transit duties payable on foreign goods were abolished.

Article IV regulated shareholdings in Western-registered companies by Chinese nationals.

Article XII of the treaty dealt with the contentious issue of extraterritoriality, whereby foreigners were exempted from the jurisdiction of the Chinese legal authorities. At the instigation of Zhang Zhidong, the article, "without precedent in China's dealings with the west" affirmed:

"China having expressed a strong desire to reform her judicial system and to bring it into accord with that of the Western nations, Great Britain agrees to give every assistance to such reform, and she will also be prepared to relinquish her extra-territorial rights when she is satisfied that the state of the Chinese laws, the arrangement for their administration, and other considerations warrant her in so doing."

Indian opium was exempted from the new import duty, remaining at 110 taels per chest with the treaty stating "there was no intention of interfering with China's right to tax native opium".

== Aftermath ==
A meeting of the influential China Association, held in Shanghai the month following the signature, endorsed the treaty by a majority of 53 votes to 45. However, in 1905, British merchants in the city complained by telegraph to British Secretary of State for Foreign Affairs Lord Lansdowne that "...China ignores the Mackay treaty, rendering the same ineffective in most essentials. China actively opposes the currency, mining, taxation, and navigation stipulations. We beg the British Government to insist on the treaty being made immediately operative."
