= Beachcomber (pen name) =

Group of column writers

Beachcomber is a nom de plume that has been used by several journalists writing a long-running humorous column in the Daily Express. It was originated in 1917 by Major John Bernard Arbuthnot MVO as his signature on the column, titled 'By the Way'. The name Beachcomber was then passed to D. B. Wyndham Lewis in 1919 and, in turn, to J. B. Morton, who wrote the column till 1975. It was later revived by William Hartston, current author of the column.

== "By the Way" column ==
"By the Way" was originally a column in The Globe, consisting of unsigned humorous pieces; P. G. Wodehouse was assistant editor of the column from August 1903 and editor from August 1904 to May 1909, during which time he was assisted by Herbert Westbrook. After the Globe's closure, it was re-established as a society news column in the Daily Express from 1917, initially written by social correspondent Major John Arbuthnot, who invented the name "Beachcomber".

After Arbuthnot was promoted to deputy editor, it was taken over sometime in 1919 by Wyndham-Lewis, who reinvented it as an outlet for his wit and humour. It was then passed to Morton during 1924, though it is likely there was a period when they overlapped. Morton wrote the column until 1975; it was revived in January 1996 and continues today, written by William Hartston. The column is unsigned except by "Beachcomber" and it was not publicly known that Morton or Wyndham-Lewis wrote it until the 1930s. The name is mainly associated with Morton, who has been credited as an influence by Spike Milligan amongst others. Morton introduced the recurring characters and serial stories that were a major feature of the column during his 51-year run.

The format of the column was a random assortment of small paragraphs which were otherwise unconnected. These could be anything, such as:

- court reports, often involving Twelve Red-Bearded Dwarfs before Mr Justice Cocklecarrot.
- angry exchanges of letters between characters such as Florence McGurgle and her dissatisfied boarders.
- interruptions from "Prodnose", representing the public, who would then be roundly cursed by the author and kicked out.
- instalments of serials that could stop, restart from earlier, be abandoned altogether or change direction abruptly without warning.
- parodies of poetry or drama, particularly of the extremely "literary" type such as Ibsen.
- unlikely headlines, such as "SIXTY HORSES WEDGED IN A CHIMNEY", for which the copy in its entirety was "The story to fit this sensational headline has not turned up yet."
- news reports from around the country.
- or just anything that the author thought funny at the time.

Morton's other interest, France, was occasionally represented by epic tales of his rambling walks through the French countryside. These were not intended as humour.

"By the Way" was popular with the readership, and of course, this is one of the reasons it lasted so long. Its style and randomness could be off-putting and it is safe to say the humour could be something of an acquired taste. Oddly, one of the column's greatest opponents was the Express newspaper's owner, Lord Beaverbrook, who had to keep being assured the column was indeed funny. A prominent critic was George Orwell, who frequently referred to him in his essays and diaries as "A Catholic Apologist" and accused him of being "silly-clever", in line with his criticisms of G. K. Chesterton, Hilaire Belloc, Ronald Knox and Wyndham-Lewis.

By the Way was one of the few features kept continuously running in the often seriously reduced Daily Express throughout World War II, when Morton's lampooning of Hitler, including the British invention of bracerot to make the Nazis' trousers fall down at inopportune moments, was regarded as valuable for morale. The column appeared daily until 1965 when it was changed to weekly. It was cancelled in 1975 and revived as a daily piece in January 1996. It continues to the present day in much the same format but is now entitled "Beachcomber", not "By the Way".

== Recurrent characters ==
- Mr. Justice Cocklecarrot: well-meaning but ineffectual High Court judge, plagued by litigation involving the twelve red-bearded dwarfs. Often appears in Private Eye.
- Mrs. Justice Cocklecarrot: Mr. Cocklecarrot's wife. Very silent, until she observes that "Wivens has fallen down a manhole". An enquiry from the judge as to which Wivens that would be elicits the response "E. D. Wivens". After a worrying interval she reveals that E. D. Wivens is a cat. His Lordship observes that cats do not have initials, to which she replies, "This one does".
- Tinklebury Snapdriver and Honeygander Gooseboote: two counsel. The elbow of one has a mysterious tendency to become jammed in the jaws of the other.
- Twelve red-bearded dwarfs, with a penchant for farcical litigation. Their names "appear to be" Scorpion de Rooftrouser, Cleveland Zackhouse, Frums Gillygottle, Edeledel Edel, Churm Rincewind, Sophus Barkayo-Tong, Amaninter Axling, Guttergorm Guttergormpton, Badly Oronparser, Listenis Youghaupt, Molonay Tubilderborst and Farjole Merrybody. They admit that these are not genuine names, one of them stating that his real name is "Bogus". (Further red-bearded dwarfs, to the number of forty-one, appear in other litigation.)
- Captain Foulenough: archetypal cad and gatecrasher who impersonates the upper class in order to wreck their social events. Educated at Narkover, a school specializing in card-playing, horse-racing and bribery. His title of "Captain" is probably spurious; but even if it had been a genuine military title, his use of it in civilian life, when at that time only officers who had achieved the rank of Major and above were allowed to do so, gives a subtle hint as to his nature.
- Mountfalcon Foulenough: the Captain's priggish nephew, who brings havoc to Narkover and "makes virtue seem even more horrifying than usual".
- Vita Brevis: debutante frequently plagued by, but with a certain reluctant admiration for, Captain Foulenough.
- Dr. Smart-Allick: genteel, but ludicrous and criminal, headmaster of Narkover.
- Miss Topsy Turvey: neighbouring headmistress, courted by Smart-Allick.
- Dr. Strabismus (whom God preserve) of Utrecht: eccentric scientist and inventor.
- The announcement of the annual list of Huntingdonshire Cabmen, with an enthusiastic endorsement of an arbitrary page.
- Lord Shortcake: absent-minded peer obsessed by his enormous collection of goldfish.
- Mrs. McGurgle: seaside landlady. Fearsomely British, until she decides to reinvent her house as "Hôtel McGurgle et de l'Univers" to attract the tourists.
- Ministry of Bubbleblowing: possible ancestor of Monty Python's Ministry of Silly Walks.
- Charlie Suet: disastrous civil servant.
- Mimsie Slopcorner: Charlie's on-off girlfriend, an ill-informed and irritating social activist.
- The Filthistan Trio: Ashura, Kazbulah and Rizamughan, three Persians from "Thurralibad", two of whom play seesaw on a plank laid across the third. They have a series of contretemps with British bureaucracy and the artistic establishment, in which the trio generally represents the voice of reason.
- Dingi-Poos: the Tibetan Venus. She obtains desirable commercial contracts by using her charms to hoodwink visiting British envoys, principally Colonel Egham and Duncan Mince.
- Big White Carstairs: Buchanesque empire builder, with a tendency to mislay his dress trousers.
- O. Thake: naive, accident-prone Old Etonian and man-about-town.
- Lady Cabstanleigh: Society hostess.
- Stultitia: Cabstanleigh's niece, a playwright.
- Boubou Flaring: glamorous but vacuous actress.
- Emilia Rustiguzzi: voluminous (both in bulk and in decibels) opera singer.
- Tumbelova, Serge Trouserin, Chuckusafiva: ballet dancers.
- Colin Velvette: ballet impresario.
- "Thunderbolt" Footle: handsome, socially celebrated boxer, who can do everything except actually fight.
- The M'Babwa of M'Gonkawiwi: African chief, who occasions great administrative problems in connection with his invitation to the coronation of King George VI.
- The Clam of Chowdah: oriental potentate
- Mrs. Wretch: formerly the glamorous circus performer Miss Whackaway, now wife to Colonel Wretch and "horrible welfare worker".
- Roland Milk: insipid poet (possible ancestor of Private Eye's "E. J. Thribb").
- Prodnose: humourless, reasonable oaf who interrupts Beachcomber's flights of fancy. (The name is journalistic slang for a sub-editor; the broadcaster Danny Baker has appropriated it as his Twitter name.)

== Other media ==
The Will Hay film Boys Will Be Boys (1935) was set at Morton's Narkover school.

According to Spike Milligan, the columns were an influence on the comedic style of his radio series, The Goon Show.

In 1968, Milligan based a BBC television series named The World of Beachcomber on the columns. A small selection was issued on a 1971 LP and a 2-cassette set of the series' soundtrack was made available in the late 1990s.

In 1989, BBC Radio 4 broadcast the first of three series based on Morton's work. This featured Richard Ingrams as Beachcomber, John Wells as Prodnose, Patricia Routledge and John Sessions. The compilations prepared by Mike Barfield. Series 1 was also made available as a 2-cassette set.

== Bibliography ==
=== Books featuring Wyndham-Lewis' work ===
- A London Farrago (1922)

=== Books featuring Morton's work ===
==== Original collections ====
- Mr Thake: his life and letters (1929)
- Mr Thake Again (1931)
- By the Way (1931)
- Morton's Folly (1933)
- The Adventures of Mr Thake (1934, republished 2008): identical to Mr Thake: his life and letters
- Mr Thake and the Ladies (1935)
- Stuff and Nonsense (1935)
- Gallimaufry (1936)
- Sideways Through Borneo (1937)
- The Dancing Cabman and other verses (1938)
- A Diet of Thistles (1938)
- A Bonfire of Weeds (1939)
- I Do Not Think So (1940)
- Fool's Paradise (1941)
- Captain Foulenough and Company (1944)
- Here and Now (1947)
- The Misadventures of Dr Strabismus (1949)
- The Tibetan Venus (1951)
- Merry-Go-Round (1958)

==== Later omnibus editions ====
- The Best of Beachcomber (ed. Michael Frayn, 1963)
- Beachcomber: the works of J. B. Morton (ed. Richard Ingrams, 1974, Muller, London)
- Cram Me With Eels: The Best of Beachcomber's Unpublished Humour (ed. Mike Barfield, 1995, Mandarin, London (ISBN 0-7493-1947-X))
