= Cliveden set =

1930s politically influential group of British people

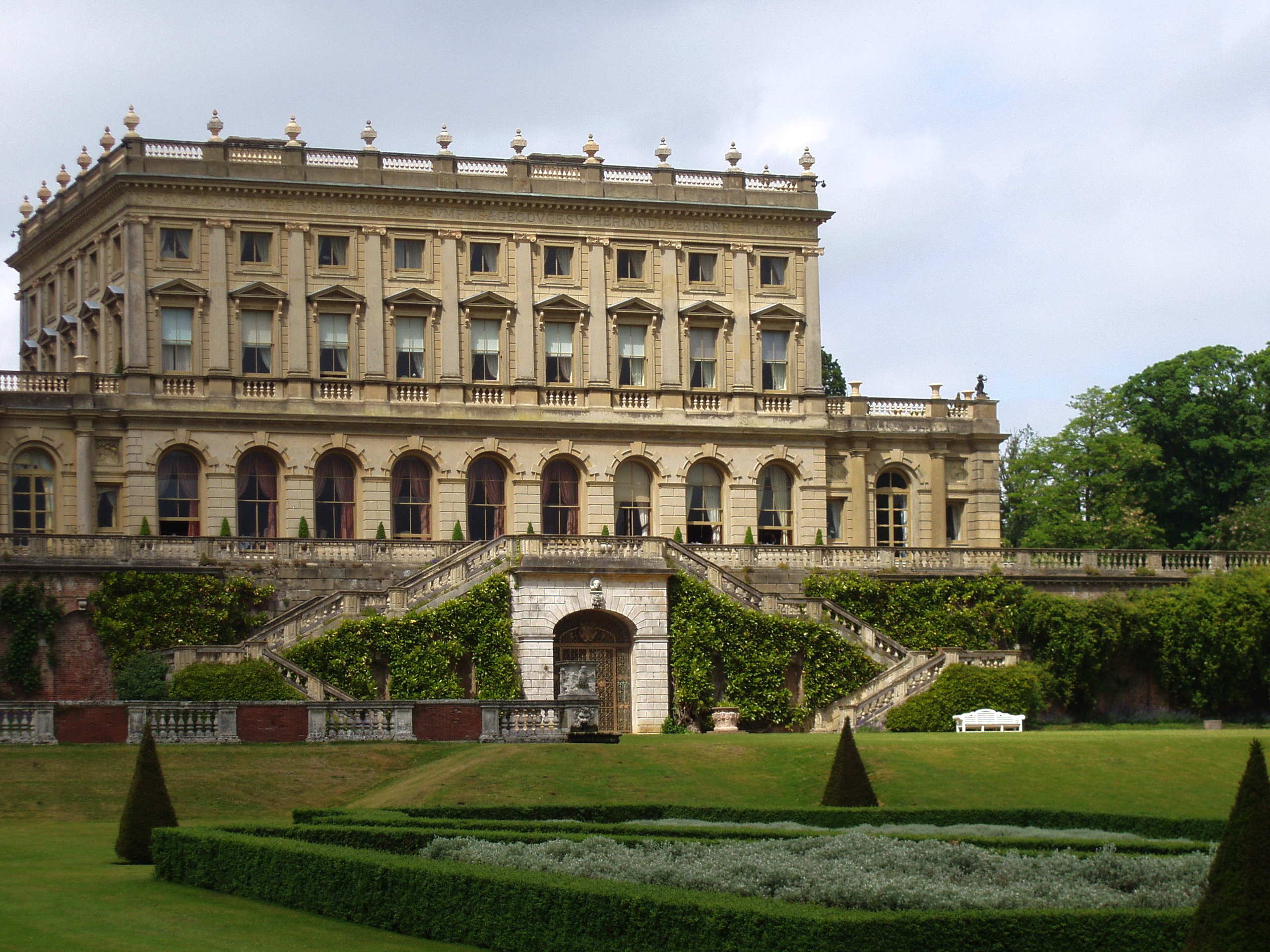
Cliveden house

The Cliveden set were an upper-class group of politically influential people active in the 1930s in the United Kingdom, prior to the Second World War. They were in the circle of Nancy Astor, Viscountess Astor, the first female Member of Parliament to take up her seat. The name comes from Cliveden, a stately home in Buckinghamshire that was Astor's country residence.

== Overview ==
The "Cliveden Set" tag was coined by Claud Cockburn in the communist newspaper The Week. Cockburn claimed various events such as Lord Halifax's visit to Germany, the removal of Robert Vansittart, the resignation of Anthony Eden, and the Easter Accords were all orchestrated by the Cliveden set. The story was subsequently picked up by other left wing presses. His notion of an upper class pro-German conspiracy was widely accepted by opponents of appeasement in the late 1930s. It was long accepted that the aristocratic Germanophile social network supported friendly relations with Nazi Germany and helped create the 1930s policy of appeasement. John L. Spivak, writing in 1939, devoted a chapter to the Cliveden Set.

Michael Astor responded to the allegations by pointing out that while it was true that many people grouped within the Cliveden Set had supported appeasement at one point; it was at a time when most politicians as well as members of the press supported the policy, with the notable exception of Winston Churchill, and that their view had changed since then.

== Accuracy ==
After the end of World War II in Europe, the discovery of the Nazis' Black Book in September 1945 showed that all the group's members were to be arrested as soon as Britain had been invaded by the Axis. Lady Astor remarked, "It is the complete answer to the terrible lie that the so-called 'Cliveden Set' was pro-Fascist." Cockburn himself later admitted the "set" was mostly his own invention, and said that the alleged conspirators "would not have known a plot if you handed it to them on a skewer".

New research shows that the Astors invited a very wide range of guests, including socialists, communists, and enemies of appeasement. Scholars no longer claim there was any Cliveden conspiracy. Historian Andrew Roberts says: "The myth of Cliveden being a nest of appeasers, let alone pro-Nazis, is exploded." Norman Rose's 2000 account of the group rejects the conspiracy theory of a pro-Nazi cabal. Carroll Quigley argues against the "mistaken idea" that the Cliveden group was pro-German: "They were neither anti-German in 1910 nor Pro-German in 1938, but pro-Empire all the time." John Grigg called the set a "myth" which allowed for a scapegoat that was "more comforting than truth."

Christopher Sykes argued that the entire story about the Cliveden Set had been an ideologically motivated fabrication by Cockburn that came to be generally accepted by the public, which was looking for scapegoats for the British prewar appeasement of Adolf Hitler. Some academic arguments have stated that Cockburn's account may have not have been entirely accurate, but that his main allegations cannot be easily dismissed.

Tim Bouverie writes that "while it is true that the majority of the aristocracy supported appeasement, this was true of the rest of the country and not confined to any one class" and that the Clivden set themselves "spent as much time playing childish games, such as musical chairs" as they did in political discussion.

== Alleged conspirators ==
- Nancy Astor, Viscountess Astor, politician and socialite
- Waldorf Astor, 2nd Viscount Astor, politician
- Robert Brand, 1st Baron Brand, civil servant and businessman
- Geoffrey Dawson, editor of the London Times newspaper
- Philip Kerr (Lord Lothian), author and politician
- William Montagu, 9th Duke of Manchester, politician
- Edward Wood (Lord Halifax), politician

== In popular culture ==
- The Remains of the Day – Lord Darlington, the fictional secondary protagonist in British author Sir Kazuo Ishiguro's 1989 novel The Remains of the Day is based on an amalgamation of several of the more prominent members of the Cliveden Set. The novel was turned into the 1993 film of the same name. The social gatherings that are held at the fictional Darlington Hall in the film between Nazis and British subjects seeking peace and being manipulated by the Nazi representatives are based on alleged dinner parties and other social gatherings by the Cliveden Set.
- Hogan's Heroes – In the fourth and fifth episodes of season six of the sitcom Hogan's Heroes, the two-part episode "Lady Chitterly's Lover" (first aired on October 11 & 18, 1970) involves a plot to negotiate Britain's surrender from a fictitious member of the Cliveden Set, Sir Charles Chitterly. While this is based on no direct historical counterpart, it does incorporate – among other events – elements of the visit to Nazi Germany in the late 1930s of the former British King Edward VIII after he had abdicated the throne in 1936 and settled into exile in France.
- Farthing – 2006 alternate history novel which contains a conspiratorial group known as the "Farthing Set" based on the supposed Cliveden Set.

== See also ==
- Round Table movement
- Anglo-German Fellowship
- Guilty Men (1940)
