= Beat the Devil (film) =

1953 film by John Huston

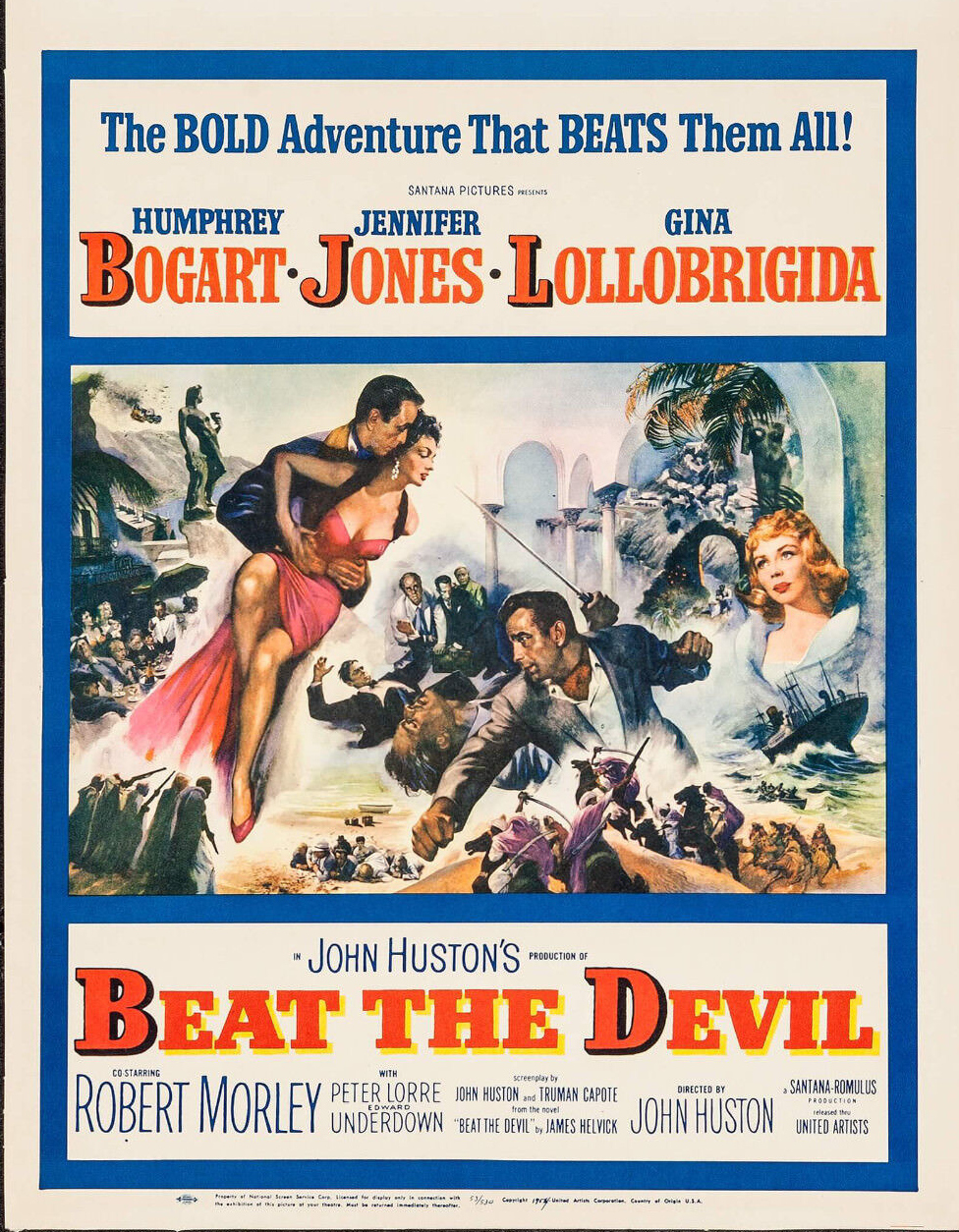
- 1953 film poster
- Directed by: John Huston
- Screenplay by: John Huston; Truman Capote
- Based on: Beat the Devil (1951 novel) by James Helvick
- Produced by: John Huston
- Starring: Humphrey Bogart; Jennifer Jones; Gina Lollobrigida; Robert Morley; Peter Lorre; Edward Underdown
- Cinematography: Oswald Morris
- Edited by: Ralph Kemplen
- Music by: Franco Mannino
- Production companies: Romulus Films; Santana Pictures Corporation
- Distributed by: British Lion Films (UK); United Artists (US)
- Release dates: 24 November 1953 (London); 12 March 1954 (New York City)
- Running time: 94 minutes
- Country: United Kingdom; United States; Italy
- Language: English
- Box office: £115,926 (UK) $1.1 million

Beat the Devil is a 1953 adventure comedy film directed and produced by John Huston, and starring Humphrey Bogart, Jennifer Jones and Gina Lollobrigida in her English-language film debut. Huston and Truman Capote wrote the screenplay, loosely based upon the 1951 novel by British journalist Claud Cockburn writing under the pseudonym James Helvick.

The script, written and revised as the shooting progressed, concerns the adventures of a group of swindlers and their associates who try to claim land rich in uranium deposits in Kenya as they wait in a small Italian port to travel aboard a tramp steamer to Mombasa.

The film was an international co-production between British, American, and Italian companies. Huston intended the film as a sort of loose parody of his 1941 film The Maltese Falcon, which also starred Bogart. Capote said, "John [Huston] and I decided to kid the story, to treat it as a parody. Instead of another Maltese Falcon, we turned it into a... [spoof] on this type of film."

== Plot ==
Billy Dannreuther is a formerly wealthy American who has fallen on hard times. He is reluctantly working with four crooks: Peterson, Julius O'Hara, Major Jack Ross and Ravello, who are trying to swindle their way to uranium-rich land in British East Africa. Billy suspects that Major Ross murdered a British colonial officer in London who threatened to expose their plan. While waiting in Italy for passage to Africa, Billy and his wife Maria meet a British couple, Harry and Gwendolen Chelm, en route to a new job for Harry managing a coffee plantation in Kenya. Harry seems a very proper and traditional Englishman, while Gwendolen is flighty and a compulsive liar. Billy and Gwendolen have an affair, while Maria flirts with Harry. Peterson becomes suspicious that the Chelms may be attempting to acquire the uranium themselves. Though this is untrue, it is fueled by Gwendolen's lies about her husband to exaggerate his importance.

Billy and Peterson, the scheme's financier, decide to take a plane instead. Their car gets away while pushing it and careens off a cliff, spurring an errant report they have been killed. Ravello then approaches Harry Chelm and explains the uranium plan. Just then, to everyone's surprise, Billy and Peterson return to the hotel unharmed. The ship's purser then announces that its tippling captain is at last ready to sail. On board, Harry reveals that he knows about Peterson's scheme and intends to inform the authorities. Peterson orders Major Ross to kill him, but Billy thwarts the murder attempt. Disbelieving Harry's outraged accusations, the ship's captain has Harry hancuffed in his room.

The ship's engine malfunctions, and the passengers are put in a lifeboat. When Billy goes to free Harry, he finds that Harry has escaped and gone overside, intending to swim ashore. The passengers land on a North African beach, where they are arrested by Arab soldiers. They are interrogated by Ahmed, an Arab official who suspects that they may be spies or revolutionaries. Billy creates a distraction by fleeing the room, and upon being recaptured befriends Ahmed by fueling Ahmed's fantasies about Rita Hayworth, whom Billy pretends to have known. Ahmed is persuaded to split a fat bribe extorted from Peterson and to send the party back to Italy by sailboat.

Upon landing, the group is questioned by a Scotland Yard detective investigating the murder of the colonial officer. He is satisfied with the interrogation until Gwendolen upends everything by revealing Peterson's scheme, the Major's murder, and Peterson's directing the Major to kill Harry. The detective arrests the four crooks. As they are taken in handcuffs, Gwendolen receives a telegram from British East Africa saying that Harry has acquired the mineral-rich land. Harry foresees himself as Africa's "uranium king", and, inviting her to join him, is willing to forgive Gwendolen for her indiscretions.

== Cast ==
- Humphrey Bogart as Billy Dannreuther
- Jennifer Jones as Gwendolen Chelm
- Gina Lollobrigida as Maria Dannreuther
- Robert Morley as Peterson
- Peter Lorre as Julius O'Hara
- Edward Underdown as Harry Chelm
- Ivor Barnard as Major Jack Ross
- Marco Tulli as Ravello
- Manuel Serrano as Ahmed
- Bernard Lee as Inspector Jack Clayton
- Giulio Donnini as Administrator
- Saro Urzì as Captain of SS Nyanga
- Mario Perrone as Purser on SS Nyanga
- Juan de Landa as Hispano-Suiza Driver
- Aldo Silvani as Charles

== Production ==
The movie was financed by the Woolf brothers, who had made The African Queen and Moulin Rogue with Huston.

During the filming of Beat the Devil, Humphrey Bogart lost several of his teeth in a car accident. Peter Sellers, unknown internationally but with a talent for imitating voices, was hired to dub lines while Bogart was adjusting to the loss of his teeth and unable to speak clearly.

Much of the film was shot at Ravello, above Italy's Amalfi Coast. The central piazza in front of the cathedral and various cafes around it are shown. Some scenes were also shot in nearby Atrani, including the pool area of the Hotel Convento Luna.

Stephen Sondheim worked as a clapper boy on the film.

== Reception ==
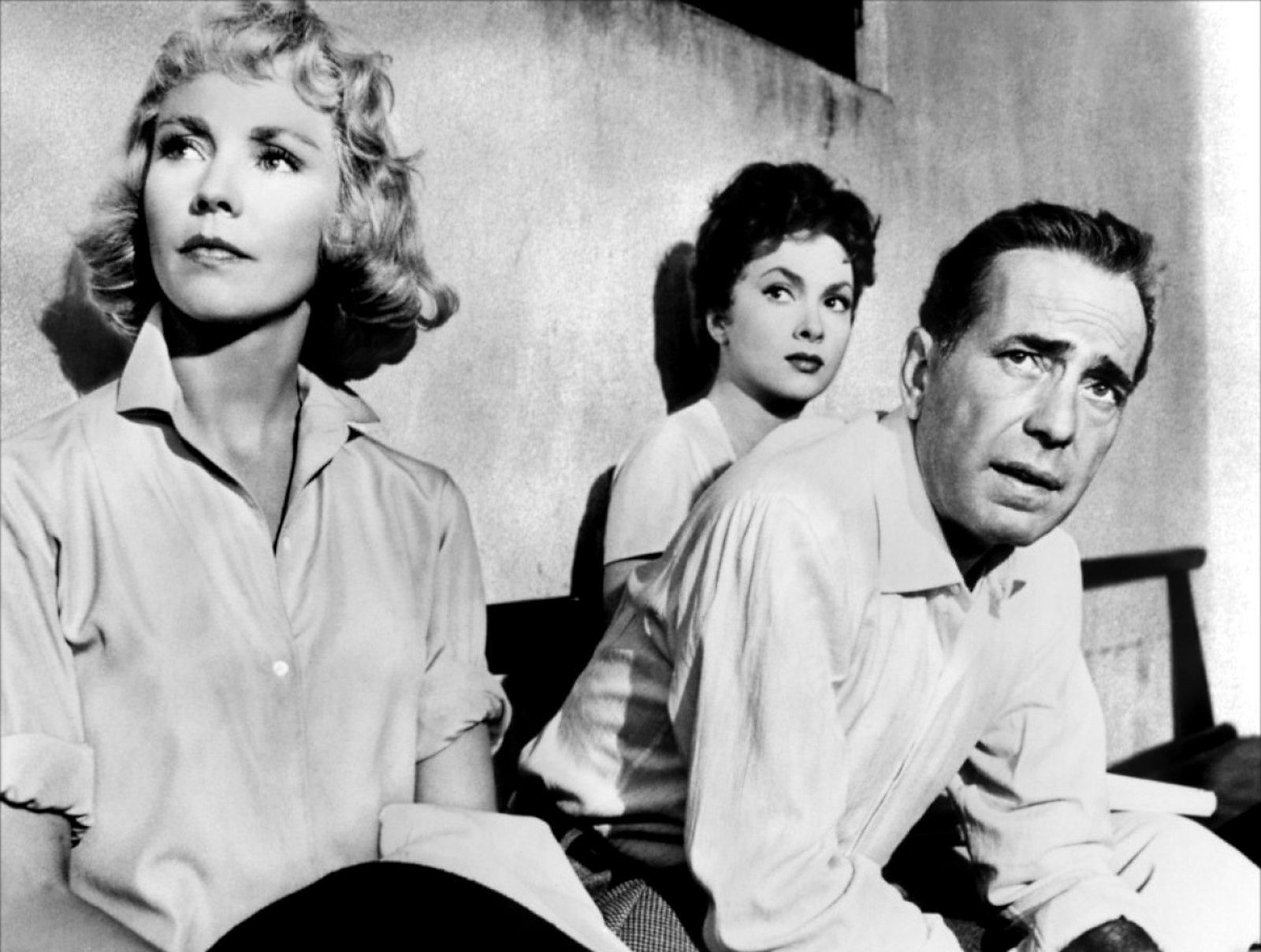
Film still image of Jennifer Jones, Gina Lollobrigida and Humphrey Bogart

Following previews, four minutes were cut from the film and it was reedited with a voiceover narration by Bogart and a flashback structure.

In a contemporary review for The New York Times, critic Howard Thompson called Beat the Devil "a pointedly roguish and conversational spoof, generally missing the book's bite, bounce and decidedly snug construction" and wrote: "[O]ff the printed page and minus the glossy Hollywood trimmings it needs, the fun wears mighty thin. Even with the cast braving a doomed freighter and fantastically thrust into an Arabian uprising, the incidents remain on a naggingly arch and lagging verbal keel. And the business of wondering what will happen next isn't too beguiling when uneasily mirrored by about half the cast. Add to this the harsh, neo-realistic photography, which authentically stalks and X-rays the joke to death."

Bogart reportedly disliked the film, possibly because he lost much of his own money financing it. Roger Ebert, who included the film in his The Great Movies publication, observed that the film has been characterized as the first camp film. Beat the Devil has been in the public domain for many years, its copyright having never been renewed.

Len Deighton cited the film and its "terror and belly laughs" as the inspiration for The IPCRESS File.

== 2016 restoration ==
In August 2016, an uncut version of Beat the Devil premiered at The Reel Thing Technical Symposium. The 4K restoration was done by Sony Pictures in collaboration with The Film Foundation and overseen by Grover Crisp. Five major differences between the two versions of the film were reported by Gary Teetzel for the website DVD Savant. Four minutes were restored, as compared to the original version, bringing the total running length of the film to 93 or 94 minutes. Unlike the original version, this restoration is copyrighted by Sony subsidiary Columbia Pictures.

== See also ==
- List of cult films
