= Patrick Cockburn =

Irish journalist (born 1950)

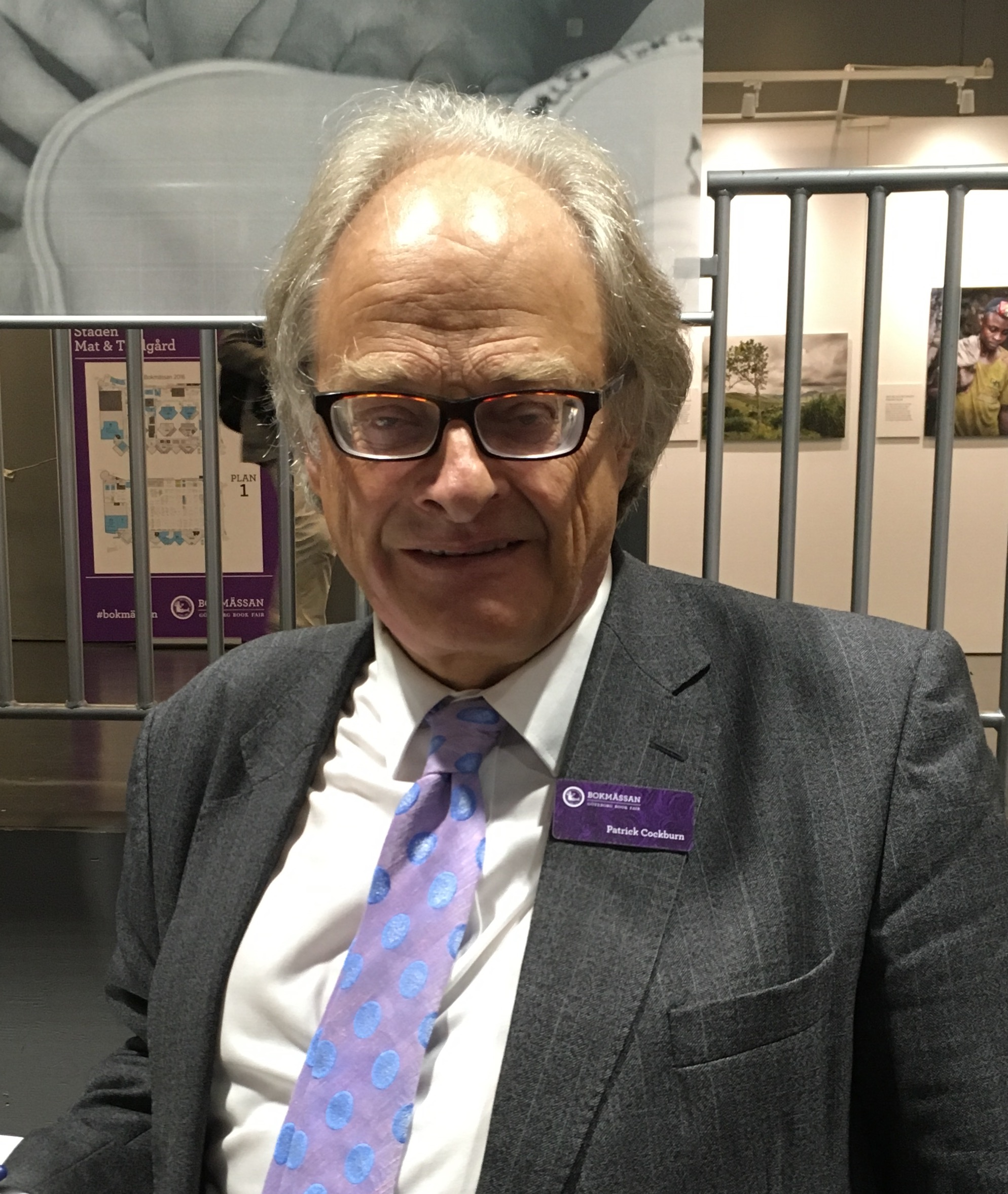
- Cockburn in 2016
- Born: Patrick Oliver Cockburn; 5 March 1950 (age 76); Ireland
- Education: Trinity College, Oxford; Queen's University Belfast
- Occupations: Writer; Journalist; Author
- Years active: 1979–present
- Employers: Financial Times; The Independent
- Notable work: Henry's Demons; The Rise of Islamic State; Chaos and Caliphate; The Age of Jihad
- Spouse: Janet Elisabeth Montefiore (m. 1981)
- Children: 2
- Parents: Claud Cockburn (father); Patricia Arbuthnot (mother)
- Relatives: Alexander Cockburn (brother); Andrew Cockburn (brother); Henry Cockburn (grandfather); John Bernard Arbuthnot (grandfather); Olivia Wilde (niece)
- Awards: See list

Patrick Oliver Cockburn (/ˈkoʊbɜːrn/ KOH-burn; born 5 March 1950) is a journalist who has been a Middle East correspondent for the Financial Times since 1979 and, from 1990, The Independent. He has also worked as a correspondent in Moscow and Washington and is a frequent contributor to the London Review of Books.

He has written three books on Iraq's recent history. He won the Martha Gellhorn Prize in 2005, the James Cameron Prize in 2006, the Orwell Prize for Journalism in 2009, Foreign Commentator of the Year (Editorial Intelligence Comment Awards 2013), Foreign Affairs Journalist of the Year (British Journalism Awards 2014), Foreign Reporter of the Year (The Press Awards For 2014).

== Early life and family ==
Cockburn was born in Ireland and grew up in County Cork. His parents were the well-known socialist author and journalist Claud Cockburn and Patricia Byron (née Arbuthnot), author of the book Figure of Eight. He was educated at Trinity College, Glenalmond, an independent school in Perthshire, and then Trinity College, Oxford. He was a research student at the Institute of Irish Studies, Queen's University Belfast, from 1972 to 1975.

In 1981, Cockburn married Janet Elisabeth ("Jan") Montefiore (b. 14 November 1948), Professor of English Literature at the University of Kent at Canterbury, and daughter of the late Bishop Hugh Montefiore. They have two children, Henry Cockburn (b. 4 January 1982) and Alexander Cockburn (b. 17 April 1987). His two brothers also became journalists: Alexander Cockburn, who died in 2012, and Andrew Cockburn, and a half-sister was mystery writer Sarah Caudwell. Journalists Laura Flanders and Stephanie Flanders are his nieces, daughters of his half-sister Claudia Flanders, and civil rights lawyer Chloe Cockburn and actress Olivia Wilde are his nieces, daughters of Andrew and Leslie Cockburn.

Cockburn is a descendant of Sir George Cockburn, a British commander during the Burning of Washington.

== Career ==
=== Newspaper correspondent ===
Cockburn began his career in 1979 shortly after leaving his PhD in Irish History at Queen's University Belfast due to the violence of the troubles that began in 1972. He worked for the Financial Times as its Middle East correspondent until 1990, when he left and joined The Independent to cover the Gulf War. He befriended Robert Fisk in Belfast and the two remained in contact until Fisk's death in October 2020.

== Writings ==
Cockburn has written three books on Iraq. The first, Out of the Ashes: The Resurrection of Saddam Hussein, was written with his brother Andrew prior to the war in Iraq. The book was later re-published in Britain under the title Saddam Hussein: An American Obsession. Two more books were written by Cockburn after the U.S. invasion, following his reporting from Iraq. The Occupation: War and Resistance in Iraq (2006) mixes first hand accounts with reporting. Cockburn's book is critical of the invasion as well as the Salafi fundamentalists who comprised much of the insurgency. The Occupation was nominated for the 2006 National Book Critics Circle award for nonfiction. The second, Muqtada: Muqtada al-Sadr, the Shia Revival, and the Struggle for Iraq was published in 2008. Muqtada is a journalistic account of the recent history of the religiously and politically prominent Sadr family, the rise of Muqtada, and the development of the Sadrist Movement since the 2003 U.S. invasion. He is also the author of The Jihadis Return: Isis and the New Sunni Uprising (2014), which has been translated into nine languages, and The Rise of Islamic State: Isis and the New Sunni Revolution (2015). Both are about how the Islamic State of Iraq and the Levant was able to set up its own state in northern Iraq and eastern Syria.

Cockburn has written a memoir, The Broken Boy (2005), which describes his childhood in 1950s Ireland, as well as an investigation of the way polio was handled – Cockburn himself caught and survived polio in 1956. He has also published a collection of essays on the Soviet Union, titled Getting Russia Wrong: The End of Kremlinology (1989). He co-wrote the book Henry's Demons with his son, Henry, which explains their coming to terms with the latter's diagnosis with schizophrenia. Cockburn also writes for CounterPunch and the London Review of Books.

== Views ==
Cockburn is critical of embedded journalism, writing in the Independent in 2010 "...There is a more subtle disadvantage to "embedding": it leads reporters to see the Iraqi and Afghan conflicts primarily in military terms, while the most important developments are political or, if they are military, may have little to do with foreign forces". He later added "...Halfway through the Iraq war, one bureau chief lamented to me, saying: "The only fairly safe place for me to send young reporters, who haven't been to Iraq before, is on 'embeds', but then they drink up everything the army tells them and report it as fact." The best reporting in any single publication during the height of the sectarian slaughter in Iraq in 2006–07 was in The New York Times, which got round this dilemma by simply hiring experienced and highly regarded correspondents from other newspapers."

On the relationship between the COVID-19 pandemic and wars, Cockburn wrote in a blog for Verso in 2020 "None of the wars I covered then have ever really ended. What has happened, however, is that they have largely ended up receding, if not disappearing, from the news agenda. I suspect that, if a successful vaccine for Covid-19 isn’t found and used globally, something of the same sort could happen with the coronavirus pandemic as well. "

== Criticism ==
Cockburn was criticised by Idrees Ahmad for an apparent claim made in his 2015 book The Rise of Islamic State about the Adra massacre of Alawites and Christians during the Syrian Civil War. Ahmad wrote that in the book Cockburn was apparently claiming to be a witness to the massacre and that this claim disagreed with Cockburn's reportage at the time, in which he stated he learned of the killings via "a Syrian [Assad regime] soldier who gave his name as Abu Ali". Ahmad also questioned whether the massacre had taken place. Cockburn said that he had not claimed to be a witness to the massacre. Rather, he charged, an "obvious error" had been, at best, misconstrued by Ahmad. Cockburn said that it was his contemporary report that was correct, that he did not witness the massacre and admonished Ahmad for doubting the fact of the massacre, mentioning "reports from the AP and Reuters news agencies" describing the massacre by Islamic militants and quoting local witnesses. Cockburn's publisher explained the error arose from the publisher summarising but misunderstanding writings by Cockburn, that Cockburn had never claimed to be a witness and that the error would be corrected in subsequent printings of the book. The publisher criticised Ahmad for using a "minor" mistake "made evident by text that surrounds and contradicts it" to "impugn the integrity" of Cockburn.

== Awards ==
- 2014 Foreign Reporter of the Year (The Press Awards).
- 2014 Foreign Affairs Journalist of the Year (British Journalism Awards UK Press Gazette)
- 2013 Foreign Commentator of the Year (Editorial Intelligence Comment Awards)
- 2011 Costa Book Awards (Biography), shortlist, Henry's Demons: Living with Schizophrenia, A Father and Son's Story (with Henry Cockburn)
- 2010 International Media Awards Peace Through Media Award.
- 2009 Orwell Prize, coverage of Iraq and his son's schizophrenia.
- 2006 The National Book Critics Circle award, shortlist, for non-fiction. The Occupation: War and Resistance in Iraq.
- 2006 James Cameron Prize
- 2005 Martha Gellhorn Prize

== Books ==
- (1989), Getting Russia Wrong: The End of Kremlinology, Verso Books, ISBN 978-0-86091-977-3
- (with Andrew Cockburn, 1999), Out of the Ashes: The Resurrection of Saddam Hussein, HarperCollins. (British title: Saddam Hussein: An American Obsession, 2002.)
- (2005), The Broken Boy, Jonathan Cape, ISBN 978-0-224-07108-6
- (2006), The Occupation: War and Resistance in Iraq, Verso Books, ISBN 978-1-84467-164-9
- (2008), Muqtada: Muqtada al-Sadr, the Shia Revival, and the Struggle for Iraq, Scribner, ISBN 978-1-4165-5147-8. (British title: Muqtada Al-Sadr and the Fall of Iraq, Faber and Faber, ISBN 978-0-571-23974-0; Muqtada Al-Sadr and the Shia Insurgency in Iraq, Faber and Faber, ISBN 978-0-571-23976-4)
- (2011), Henry's Demons: Living with Schizophrenia, A Father and Son's Story Charles Scribner's Sons Scribner
- (2014), The Jihadis Return: ISIS and the New Sunni Uprising, OR Books, New York: 2014
  - Republished in 2015 as The Rise of Islamic State: Isis and the New Sunni Revolution, London and New York: Verso, 3 February 2015, ISBN 978-1-78478-040-1.
- (2016) Chaos and Caliphate: Jihadis and the West in the struggle for the Middle East, OR Books, ISBN 978-1682190289
- (2016) The Age of Jihad: Islamic State and the Great War for the Middle East, Verso Books, ISBN 978-1784784492
- (2020) War in the Age of Trump: The Defeat of Isis, the Fall of the Kurds, the Conflict with Iran, Verso Books, ISBN 978-1839760402
- (2024) Believe Nothing Until It Is Officially Denied: Claud Cockburn and the Invention of Guerrilla Journalism, ISBN 978-1804290743
