= John Bernard Arbuthnot =

British soldier, banker and journalist

Major John Bernard Arbuthnot, MVO (17 May 1875 – 16 September 1950) was a British soldier, banker, and journalist.

== Early life ==
Arbuthnot was born on 17 May 1875 in London. He was the eldest son of Col. George Arbuthnot and Caroline Emma Nepean Aitchison. His father was an MP for Hereford. Among his siblings were Dorothy Gertrude Arbuthnot, who married Brig.-Gen. Hugh Frederick Bateman-Champain.

His paternal grandparents were John Alves Arbuthnot of Coworth Park, Old Windsor, Sunningdale, Berkshire, and, his cousin, Mary Arbuthnot. His maternal grandparents were Frances Matilda Farish (a daughter of James Farish, one-time acting Governor of Bombay) and Capt. Andrew Nepean Aitchison of the East India Company Service.

== Career ==
He was commissioned a second lieutenant in the Scots Guards on 18 July 1896, and promoted to the rank of lieutenant on 22 September 1898. Following the outbreak of the Second Boer War in late 1899, he was with the 2nd Battalion of his regiment as it left Southampton for South Africa on the SS Britannic in March 1900. On arrival, the battalion was attached to the 16th Infantry Brigade serving as part of the 8th Division under Sir Leslie Rundle. He fought with the 2nd battalion until the end of the war in May 1902. After his return to the United Kingdom, he was on 15 August 1902 appointed Aide-de-Camp to Sir Henry Arthur Blake, Governor of Hong Kong. Before departure for Hong Kong, he took part in the Coronation of King Edward VII and Queen Alexandra, and for this service was invested as a Member (fifth class) of the Royal Victorian Order (MVO) two days after the ceremony, on 11 August 1902. He was promoted to captain on 17 December 1902. He later served in the First World War, where he was mentioned in despatches, and reached the rank of major.

He was also a merchant banker.

As a journalist on the Daily Express, in 1917 he founded and was author to its By the Way column, writing it pseudonymously as 'Beachcomber', before he was promoted to deputy editor and passed the role to D. B. Wyndham-Lewis in 1919.

== Personal life ==
On 8 June 1903, he married Olive Blake in Hong Kong. Olive was the only daughter of the Sir Henry Arthur Blake, and wife Edith Bernal Osborne. They had six children:

- Irene Joan Grace Arbuthnot (1904–1997), an explorer and author known as Joan Arbuthnot, wrote the book More Profit Than Gold, published in 1935.
- David George Arbuthnot (1905–1985), who married Elisabeth Kemeys-Tynte, 10th Baroness Wharton, in 1933. They divorced 1946. That same year, he married Barbara Margherita (née Chiappini) Douglas-Hamilton, daughter of Francis Chiappini and widow of Percy Seymour Douglas-Hamilton, in 1946.
- Group Captain Terence John Arbuthnot (1906–1995), who married Karin Gunborg Sundgren, daughter of Carl Adolph Sundgren, in 1937.
- Commander Bernard Kieran Charles Arbuthnot (1909–1975), who married Rosemary Harold Thompson, daughter of Lt.-Col. Harold Thompson, in 1939.
- Major Richard Henry Myles Arbuthnot (1911–1943), who was killed on active service in Italy; he married Marjorie Helen Miller, daughter of Ralph Miller, in 1939.
- Patricia Evangeline Anne Arbuthnot (1914–1989), who married Arthur Cecil Byron, son of Cecil Byron, in 1933. They divorced in 1940, and she remarried to Francis Claud Cockburn of Brook Lodge in 1940.

Arbuthnot died on 16 September 1950.
