= Beat the Devil (novel) =

Novel by Claud Cockburn

First US edition

Beat the Devil is a 1951 thriller written by British journalist Claud Cockburn under the pseudonym James Helvick. Cockburn used the pseudonym because, although he had left the British Communist Party in 1947, he was still considered a "Red" during the early years of the Cold War, which was rife with anti-communist sentiment. Beat the Devil was Cockburn's first novel, and the first work of fiction that the long-time political journalist had written since the 1920s. The title was later used by Cockburn's son Alexander for his regular column in The Nation.

The novel was published in the United Kingdom by Boardman and in the United States by J. B. Lippincott & Co. The publishers paid Cockburn an advance of between £200–300 (approx. $750). Beat the Devil was made into a 1953 film by director John Huston, who paid Cockburn £3,000 for the rights to the book and screenplay. Cockburn collaborated with Huston on the early drafts of the script, but the credit went to Truman Capote.
