= Alexander Cockburn =

Scottish-born Irish-American political journalist and writer

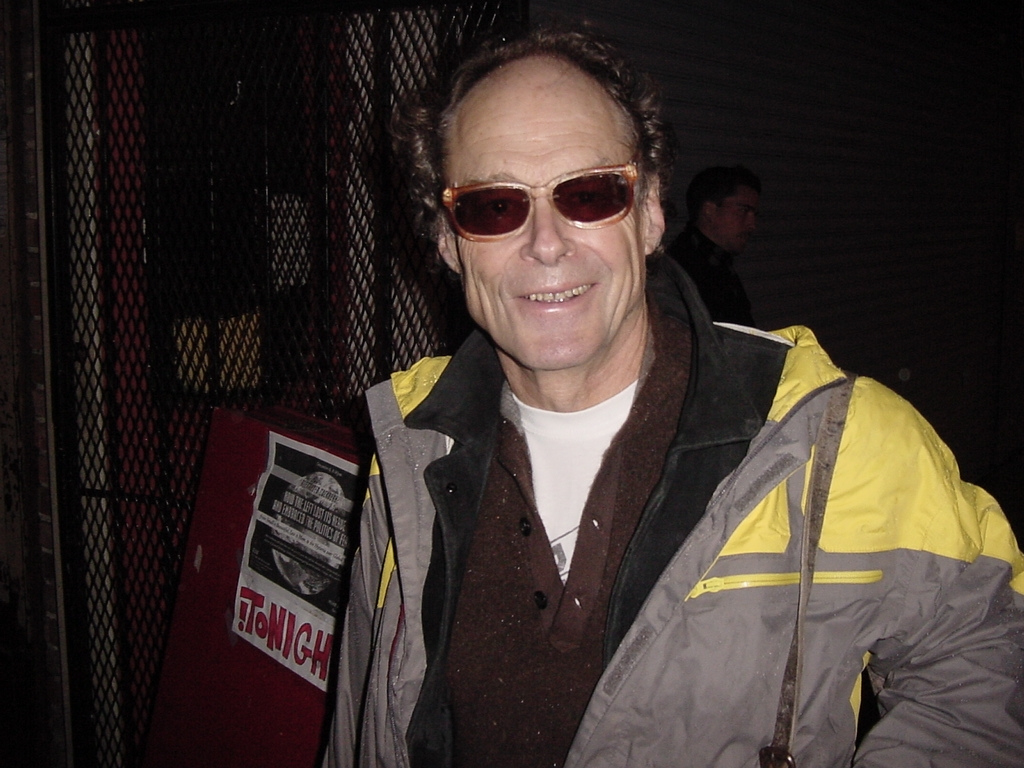
- Cockburn in 2007
- Born: Alexander Claud Cockburn; 6 June 1941; Scotland
- Died: 21 July 2012 (aged 71); Bad Salzhausen, Germany
- Occupations: Journalist, author
- Notable credit(s): CounterPunch, The Nation, The Wall Street Journal, Los Angeles Times
- Spouse: Emma Tennant (m. 1968; div. 1973)
- Children: 1
- Parent(s): Claud Cockburn; Patricia Cockburn

Alexander Claud Cockburn (/ˈkoʊbərn/ KOH-bərn; 6 June 1941 – 21 July 2012) was a Scottish-born Irish-American political journalist and writer. Cockburn was brought up by British parents in Ireland, and lived and worked in the United States from 1972. Together with Jeffrey St. Clair, he edited the political newsletter CounterPunch. Cockburn also wrote the "Beat the Devil" column for The Nation, and another column for The Week in London, syndicated by Creators Syndicate.

== Background ==
Alexander Cockburn was born on June 6, 1941, in Scotland and grew up in Youghal, County Cork, Ireland. He was the eldest son of journalist Claud Cockburn, a former Communist author, and his third wife, Patricia Byron, née Arbuthnot. (She wrote an autobiography, Figure of Eight). His ancestral family included Sir George Cockburn, 10th Baronet, who was responsible for the Burning of Washington, DC in the War of 1812. His two younger brothers, Andrew and Patrick, are also journalists.

His half-sister, Sarah Caudwell, a barrister and mystery writer, died in 2000. His half-sister Claudia Cockburn and her husband Michael Flanders have two daughters, who are both journalists: Laura and Stephanie Flanders. Actress Olivia Wilde is the daughter of his brother Andrew.

Cockburn grew up between his family home in Ireland and Trinity College, Glenalmond, an independent boys' boarding school, in Perthshire, Scotland. He later studied English at Keble College, University of Oxford.

== Career ==
=== United Kingdom ===
Cockburn graduated from Oxford in 1963, after which he worked at the New Left Review, becoming its managing editor in 1966. He was also assistant editor at the Times Literary Supplement, and in 1967 worked at New Statesman. In 1967, Cockburn co-edited The Incompatibles: Trade Union Militancy and the Consensus with Robin Blackburn. Blackburn described the book as "[bringing] together trade-union organizers, leftwing journalists including Paul Foot, Marxist economists and two liberals—Michael Frayn and Philip Toynbee—who mocked the demonization of union activists by Labour as well as Conservative pundits." In 1969, the pair co-edited Student Power: Problems, Diagnosis, Action, with contributors including Herbert Marcuse, Perry Anderson, and Tom Nairn. In 1968, Cockburn published a letter to The Times supporting British socialists protesting the Vietnam War.

=== United States ===
Cockburn moved to the United States in 1972 and lived there for the rest of his years. He contributed pieces to The New York Review of Books, Esquire, Harper's, and, from 1973 to 1983, The Village Voice. For the latter, he initiated the longstanding "Press Clips" column. His interview of Rupert Murdoch in The Voice preceded Murdoch's purchase of the paper. James Ridgeway later noted that "Murdoch, when he owned the Voice, was said to gag on some of Alex's pointed epithets, but he never did anything about it."

In 1975, Cockburn wrote Idle Passion: Chess and the Dance of Death. In 1979, Cockburn and Ridgeway co-wrote Political Ecology.

In 1982, Cockburn was suspended from The Voice for "accepting a $10,000 grant from an Arab studies organization in 1982." In 1984, Cockburn became a regular contributor to The Nation with a column called "Beat the Devil", titled for the novel of the same name written by his father. During the 1980s, Cockburn also contributed to the New York Press, the Los Angeles Times, the New Statesman, the Anderson Valley Advertiser, The Week, The Wall Street Journal, and Chronicles.

In 1987, Cockburn completed the first of a series of books collecting columns, diary entries, letters, and essays dating from 1976, titled Corruptions of Empire; the cover featured a portrayal of Admiral George Cockburn torching the White House. Follow-up books included The Golden Age Is In Us: Journeys and Encounters (1995) and A Colossal Wreck: A Road Trip Through Political Scandal, Corruption, and American Culture (2013). In the 1990s, Cockburn contributed to, and eventually became co-editor of, the newsletter CounterPunch.

Cockburn became a United States citizen in 2009. He lived in New York City for many years, before moving to Petrolia in Humboldt County in northern California in 1992.

== Political views and activities ==
=== Anti-war positions ===
In a January 1980, Village Voice column, Cockburn criticized the US media's coverage of the Soviet–Afghan War, and described Afghanistan as "An unspeakable country filled with unspeakable people, sheepshaggers and smugglers ... I yield to none in my sympathy to those prostrate beneath the Russian jackboot, but if ever a country deserved rape it's Afghanistan." Cockburn later said that his comments were "satirical," "tasteless," and that he "shouldn't have written it ... it was a joke."

The USS Vincennes fired a missile in 1988 that brought down Iran Air Flight 655, killing 290 people. With Ken Silverstein, in reaction the two men co-wrote articles critical of the United States military and its commanders. Cockburn also criticized economic and political sanctions imposed on the Iraqi government by the United Nations. He said that such policies targeted "rogue states (most of which, like the Taliban or Saddam Hussein, started off as creatures of US intelligence)." After the September 11 attacks, he criticized the 2001 United States invasion of Afghanistan, and the 2003 invasion of Iraq by United States-led forces.

=== Opinion on conspiracy theories ===
Cockburn opposed conspiracism, particularly in regard to 9/11 conspiracy theories. He interpreted the rise of these ideas as a sign of the decline of the American Left. Cockburn also criticized conspiracy theories related to the 1963 assassination of US president Kennedy and the Country Walk case. He did suggest in writing that the US government had prior knowledge of the 1941 Japanese military attack on Pearl Harbor.

Cockburn was a vehement opponent of the scientific consensus on climate change. He described the 2007 Nobel Peace Prize awarded to Al Gore and the Intergovernmental Panel on Climate Change as the result of "Bogus science topped off with toxic alarmism. It’s as ridiculous as if Goebbels got the Nobel Peace Prize in 1938, sharing it with the Kaiser Wilhelm Institute for his work in publicizing the threat to race purity posed by Jews, Slavs and gypsies."

=== Support of US constitutional rights ===
External videos
- Digital Commons discussion. Battle of Ideas 2007, Royal College of Art, London.

Cockburn supported free speech, writing that "Free speech counts most when it's most risky". He said, "America is well on its way to making it illegal to say anything nasty about gays, Jews, blacks and women [...] with the First Amendment gone the way of the dodo." Cockburn wrote approvingly of the right-wing Patriot movement and militia rallies.

Asked about his position on the Second Amendment and gun control, Cockburn once said, "a native Mexican turkey wandered onto my property in Humboldt County, unaware that the California Fish and Game regulations permitted a window of vulnerability for the aforementioned wild turkey. I then proceeded to my 12-gauge and brought that turkey down, thirteen and a half pounds, plucked it, drew it, and ate it, with my loved ones as they say," but also said "I think that people shouldn't carry howitzers." Following the 2007 Virginia Tech massacre, Cockburn wrote, "There have been the usual howls from the anti-gun lobby, but it's all hot air. America is not about to dump the Second Amendment giving people the right to bear arms." He suggested several alternative measures to increased gun control around institutions of mandatory and elective education.

=== Social topics ===
Among other social topics, Cockburn wrote extensively about his opposition to "scaremongering" about illegal immigration to the United States, antisemitism and use of antisemitism accusations in modern politics (for which he received criticism), and his support of the Occupy Wall Street movement. Cockburn also wrote about same-sex marriage and Scientology.

== Personal life and death ==
In December 1968, Cockburn married writer Emma Tennant; their daughter Daisy Alice Cockburn was born in February 1969. Cockburn and Tennant divorced in 1973.

Cockburn had a complicated personal and professional relationship with British author and journalist Christopher Hitchens. Robin Blackburn commented that Cockburn “sort of invented Christopher. He showed him what could be done."

Cockburn died on 21 July 2012, in Bad Salzhausen, Germany, age 71, after suffering from cancer for two years.

In CounterPunch, Jeffrey St. Clair wrote, "[Cockburn] didn't want the disease to define him. He didn't want his friends and readers to shower him with sympathy. He didn't want to blog his own death as Christopher Hitchens had done. Alex wanted to keep living his life right to the end."

== Works ==
External videos
- White Out: The CIA, Drugs and the Press. Cockburn discussed his book about the CIA's alleged involvement with the illicit drug trade in Los Angeles, California. Book TV on C-SPAN, September 25, 1998.

Books

- The Incompatibles: Trade Union Militancy and the Consensus (1967) with Robin Blackburn.
- Student Power (1969) with Robin Blackburn.
- Idle Passion: Chess and the Dance of Death (1975)
- Smoke: Another Jimmy Carter Adventure (1978) with James Ridgeway.
- Political Ecology (1979) with James Ridgeway.
- Corruptions of Empire (1988)
- The Fate of the Forest: Developers, Destroyers and Defenders of the Amazon (1989) with Susanna Hecht.
- The Golden Age Is in Us: Journeys and Encounters (1995)
- Washington Babylon (1995) with Ken Silverstein.
- Whiteout: The CIA, Drugs and the Press (1998) with Jeffrey St. Clair.
- 5 Days That Shook The World: The Battle for Seattle and Beyond (2000) with Jeffrey St. Clair.
- Al Gore: A User's Manual (2000) with Jeffrey St. Clair.
- CounterPunch: The Journalism That Rediscovers America (2002) with Jeffrey St. Clair.
- The Politics of Anti-Semitism (2003) with Jeffrey St. Clair.
- Serpents in the Garden (2004) with Jeffrey St. Clair.
- Imperial Crusades (2004) with Jeffrey St. Clair.
- Dime's Worth of Difference (2004) with Jeffrey St. Clair.
- End Times: Death of the Fourth Estate (2006) with Jeffrey St. Clair.
- A Colossal Wreck: A Road Trip Through Political Scandal, Corruption, And American Culture (2013)
- An Orgy of Thieves (2023) with Jeffrey St. Clair.

Articles

- "Will There Always Be an England?" Ramparts Magazine (Apr. 1974), pp. 31-37.
- "Beat the Devil." The Nation (Nov. 29, 1993), pp. 646–647.
- "Tuna, Free Trade and Cocaine," with Ken Silverstein. Earth Island Journal, vol. 11, no. 3 (Summer 1996), p. 7. JSTOR 43878210.

Book reviews

- "The Natural Artificer." Review of P. G. Wodehouse: A Biography by Frances Donaldson. New York Review of Books (Sep. 23, 1982).

Audio/spoken word

- Beating the Devil: The Incendiary Rants of Alexander Cockburn. AK Press (2002).

Interviews

- Chomsky, Noam. "Models, Nature, and Language." Interview with Alexander Cockburn. Grand Street, no. 50 (Autumn 1994), pp. 170–176. doi:10.2307/25007794. JSTOR 25007794.
