= Donald Cameron Watt =

British historian (1928–2014)

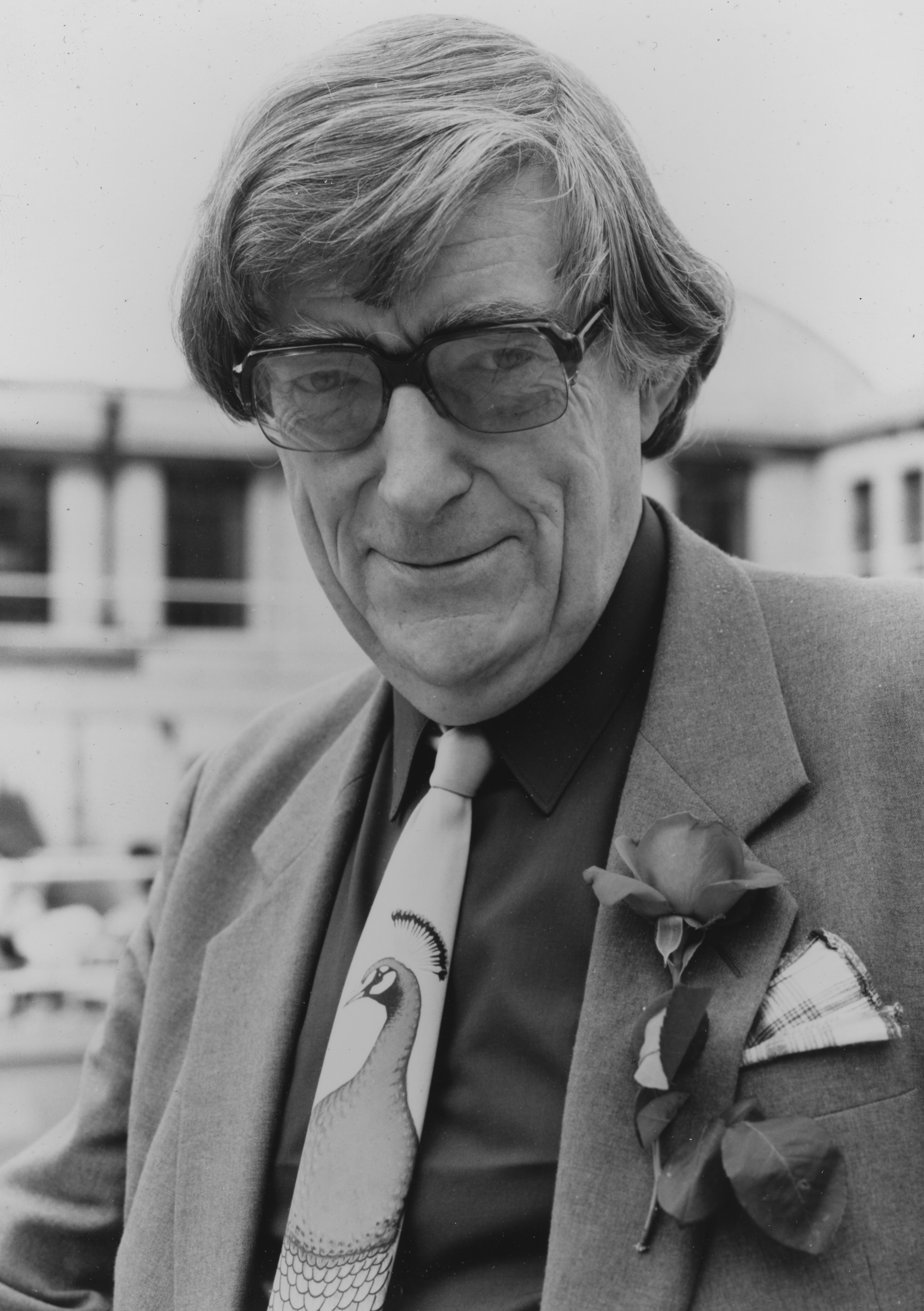
- Donald Cameron Watt, c. 1980
- Born: 17 May 1928
- Died: 30 October 2014 (aged 86)
- Education: Rugby School
- Alma mater: Oriel College, Oxford
- Occupation: Historian
- Spouses: Marianne Grau; Felicia Stanley
- Children: 1 son

Donald Cameron Watt (17 May 1928 – 30 October 2014) was a British historian.

== Early life ==
Donald Cameron Watt was a chorister in the Choir of King's College, Cambridge, and then was educated at Rugby School. He read Philosophy, Politics and Economics at Oriel College, Oxford, graduating from Oxford University with a bachelor's degree in 1951.

== Career ==
Watt served as a Professor of International History at the London School of Economics, where he served as the Head of the Department and Stevenson Chair of International History from 1981 to 1993.

Watt edited Survey of International Affairs at Chatham House from 1962 to 1971. He was the author or co-author of 25 books. He won the Wolfson History Prize in 1990.

== Personal life and death ==
Watt was married twice. He first married Marianne Grau in 1951, and they had a son. After she died in 1962, he married Felicia Stanley. She predeceased him in 1997.

Watt died on 30 October 2014. He was 86 years old.

== Works ==
- Watt, Donald Cameron (1957). Documents on the Suez Crisis, 26 July to 6 November 1956. London, U.K.: Royal Institute of International Affairs. OCLC 818220.
- Mayall, James; Navari, Cornelia; Watt, Donald Cameron (1973). Documents on International Affairs, 1963. London, U.K.: Oxford University Press. OCLC 1331464.
- Watt, Donald Cameron (1965). Personalities and Policies: Studies in the Formulation of British Foreign Policy in the Twentieth Century. Notre Dame, Indiana: University of Notre Dame Press. OCLC 404671.
- Watt, Donald Cameron (1965). Britain Looks to Germany: British Opinion and Policy Towards Germany Since 1945. London, U.K.: O. Wolff. OCLC 358292.
- Brown, Neville; Spencer, Frank; Watt, Donald Cameron (1968). A History of the World in the Twentieth Century. New York: Scott Foresman. OCLC 6536389.
- Watt, Donald Cameron (1969). Contemporary History in Europe: Problems and Perspectives. New York: Praeger. OCLC 11705.
- Mayall, James; Watt, Donald Cameron (1973). Current British Foreign Policy: Documents, Statements, Speeches, 1971. London, U.K.: Temple Smith. ISBN 9780851170411. OCLC 55644303.
- Watt, Donald Cameron (1975). Too Serious a Business: European Armed Forces and the Approach to the Second World War. Berkeley, California: University of California Press. ISBN 9780520028296. OCLC 1370478.
- Watt, Donald Cameron (1984). Succeeding John Bull: America in Britain's Place, 1900-1975: A Study of the Anglo-American Relationship and World Politics in the Context of British and American Foreign Policy-Making in the Twentieth Century. Cambridge, U.K.: Cambridge University Press. ISBN 9780521250221. OCLC 9686557.
- Watts, Donald Cameron (1989). How War Came: The Immediate Origins of the Second World War, 1938-1939. New York: Pantheon Books. ISBN 9780394579160. OCLC 19921655.
