= Sarah Caudwell =

English barrister and detective fiction author (1939–2000)

- Born: Sarah Cockburn; 27 May 1939; London, England, UK
- Died: 28 January 2000 (aged 60); London, England, UK
- Education: University of Aberdeen; St Anne's College, Oxford
- Occupations: Writer, barrister
- Relatives: Claud Cockburn (father); Jean Ross (mother)
- Writing career
- Genre: Mystery
- Subject: Law
- Notable awards: 1990 Anthony Award

Sarah Cockburn (27 May 1939 – 28 January 2000), who wrote under the pseudonym of Sarah Caudwell, was a British barrister and author of detective stories. Her series of four murder stories written between 1980 and 1999 centered on a group of young barristers practicing in Lincoln's Inn, narrated by a Hilary Tamar, a professor of medieval law whose gender is never specified, who fills the role of detective.

== Early life ==
Sarah Cockburn was born on 27 May 1939 in Weir Road, London. Her father was Claud Cockburn, the left-wing journalist, and her mother was Jean Ross, a journalist and political activist. Ross was also inspiration for the character Sally Bowles in Christopher Isherwood's Goodbye to Berlin and its musical adaptation Cabaret. Her parents were unmarried and her father left three months after Sarah's birth.

Caudwell's three half-brothers Alexander Cockburn, Andrew Cockburn, and Patrick Cockburn are journalists. She was the half-sister-in-law of Leslie Cockburn and Michael Flanders. Journalists Laura Flanders and Stephanie Flanders, and actress Olivia Wilde are her half-nieces.

During World War II, she lived in Welwyn and Stevenage, Hertfordshire, with her mother and maternal grandmother. In 1945, they moved to Cheltenham. She and her mother moved to Scotland in the 1950s, where she attended Aberdeen High School for Girls. She received her MA in classics from the University of Aberdeen in 1960 and won a scholarship to study in Greece.

She then studied law at St Anne's College, University of Oxford. She was one of the first two female students invited to speak at the Oxford Union, after her friends Jenny Grove and Rose Dugdale dressed in men's clothes to gain entrance to the male-only debating chamber and had then canvassed support for the admission of female students. She graduated with her BCL in 1962.

== Career ==
On coming down from Oxford, she lectured on Law at the University College of Wales, Aberystwyth. She then spent a year at Cité Universitaire des Jeunes Filles at Nancy, receiving a diploma in French law. Having been called to the Bar in 1966, she joined the Chancery bar. She practised as a barrister first at the Middle Temple and then at Lincoln's Inn, specialising in property and tax law. She later joined Lloyds Bank, where she specialised in international tax planning and became a senior executive in the trust department. It was at this time that she started to write.

Fellow barrister John Tackebury praised her accomplishments at the bar: "As a woman, she had to have had a first-class mind to join the Chancery bar, to have built up a successful practice and to have become a senior executive at Lloyds... All these institutions were highly resistant to women at a senior level, and certainly to a woman who smoked a pipe."

== Personal life and death ==
Caudwell was an inveterate crossword solver, reaching the final of The Times Crossword Competition more than once. For many years, she lived in Barnes, London, with her mother and aunt. She died of throat cancer on 28 January 2000 in Whitehall, London.

== Writing ==
=== Hilary Tamar series ===
This series of four books, described as "legal whodunits", were written over a period of twenty years. Their primary setting is the second floor of 62 New Square at Lincoln's Inn, where four young junior barristers have their chambers: Michael Cantrip, Desmond Ragwort, Selena Jardine and Timothy Shepherd. While the last named only appears sporadically, taxes barrister Julia Larwood, who works in the adjacent premises, is a regular visitor and is in effect the fifth member of the group.

Acting as a kind of parent to the group is the first-person narrator, Professor Hilary Tamar. Professor Tamar, a former tutor of Timothy Shepherd, also acts as the main detective, although other characters make contributions to the eventual solutions. Professor Tamar is frequently physically removed from the action and is kept informed by a series of long letters and telexes. The author's expertise in tax law is frequently brought into play, inheritance law being relevant to financial motives for murder. She was particularly popular among other legal professionals, including American jurist Robert Bork, who was once quoted as saying, "In my opinion, there can't be too many Sarah Caudwell novels".

=== Other writing ===
Caudwell collaborated on crime fiction-related acrostics with Michael Z. Lewin and with Lawrence Block and others for The Perfect Murder. She also wrote a play, The Madman's Advocate, which was given a rehearsed reading in Nottingham in 1995: a study of Daniel M'Naghten's attempt in 1843 to assassinate Sir Robert Peel and the resulting establishment of the M'Naghten Rule as a legal standard for defining the sanity of a defendant in law.

== Awards ==
The Shortest Way to Hades was nominated for the Best Novel award at the 1986 Anthony awards. Caudwell won the 1990 award for The Sirens Sang of Murder in the same category.

In 2010, the Japanese edition of The Sibyl in Her Grave was shortlisted for the Best Translated Honkaku Mystery of the Decade (2000-2009).

== Published works ==
Hilary Tamar novels

- Thus Was Adonis Murdered (1981)
- The Shortest Way to Hades (1985)
- The Sirens Sang of Murder (1989)
- The Sibyl in Her Grave (2000), published posthumously

Other works

- The Perfect Murder: Five Great Mystery Writers Create the Perfect Crime (1991) (with Lawrence Block, Tony Hillerman and Jack Hitt)

Contributions to anthologies

- 2nd Culprit: An Annual of Crime Stories (1994)
- 3rd Culprit (1994)
- Malice Domestic 6 (1997)
- The Oxford Book of Detective Stories (2000), published posthumously
- Women Before the Bench (2001), published posthumously
- The Mammoth Book of Comic Crime (2002), published posthumously

== Sources ==
- Garebian, Keith (2011). The Making of Cabaret. Oxford: Oxford University Press. ISBN 978-0199732500.
- Isherwood, Christopher (1976). Christopher and His Kind: A Memoir, 1929-1939. New York: Farrar, Straus and Giroux. ISBN 978-0374-53522-3.
- St James Guide to Crime & Mystery Writers, Fourth Edition; 1990. Jay Pederson (ed.), "Sarah Caudwell", pp. 162–63.
