= List of cathedrals in Japan =

This is the list of cathedrals in Japan sorted by denomination.

== Roman Catholic ==
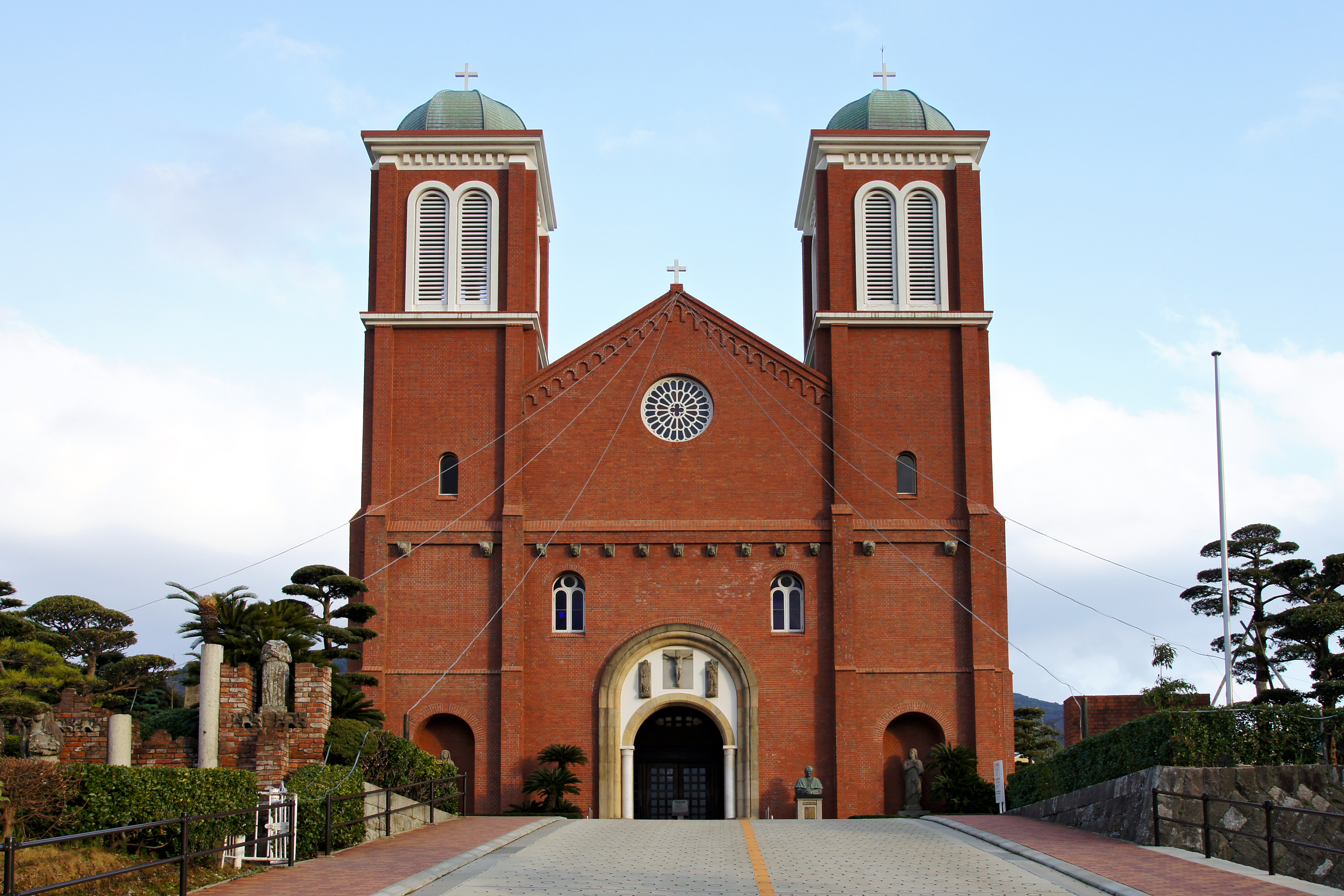
Immaculate Conception Cathedral (Urakami Church) in Nagasaki

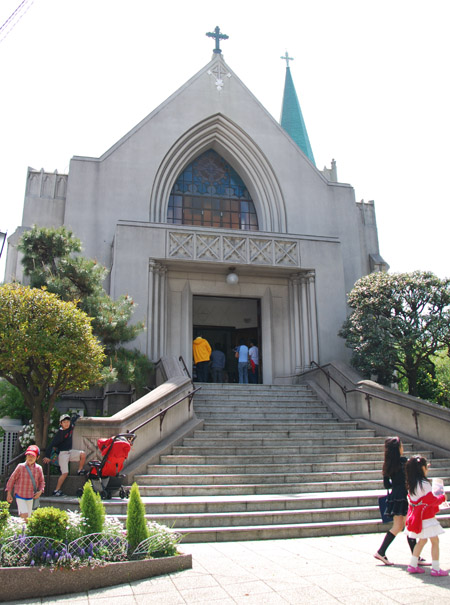
Yokohama Cathedral

Cathedrals of the Catholic Church in Japan:

- Cathedral of the Blessed Virgin Mary (Tamatsukuri Church) in Osaka
- Cathedral of Christ the King (Niigata Church) in Niigata
- Cathedral of the Immaculate Heart of Mary (Kainan Church) in Naha
- Cathedral of Our Lady of Victory (Daimyomachi Church) in Fukuoka
- Cathedral of Our Lady of the Assumption (Memorial Cathedral of World Peace) (Noboricho Church) in Hiroshima
- Cathedral of the Sacred Heart (Yamate Church) in Yokohama
- Cathedral of St. Mary of the Immaculate Conception (Sekiguchi) in Tokyo
- Cathedral of Sts. Peter and Paul (Nunoike Church) in Nagoya
- Cathedral of St. Theresa of the Child Jesus (Urawa Church) in Urawa
- Immaculate Conception Cathedral (Urakami Church) in Nagasaki
- Kitaichijo Cathedral Church in Sapporo
- Motoderakoji Cathedral Church in Sendai
- Sakuramachi Cathedral Church in Takamatsu
- St. Francis Xavier Cathedral (Oita Church) in Oita
- St. Francis Xavier Cathedral, Kagoshima
- St. Francis Xavier Cathedral, Kyoto (Kawaramachi Church)

== Eastern Orthodox ==
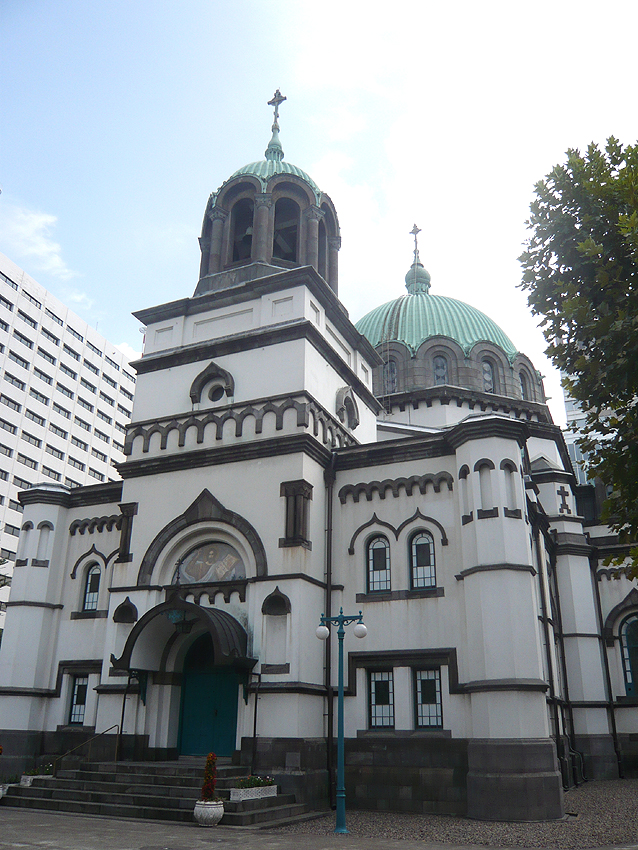
Holy Resurrection Cathedral in Chiyoda, Tokyo

Japanese Orthodox cathedrals:

- Holy Annunciation Cathedral in Kyoto
- Holy Annunciation Cathedral in Sendai
- Holy Resurrection Cathedral in Chiyoda, Tokyo

== Anglican ==
Cathedrals of the Anglican Church in Japan:

- Christ Church Cathedral in Sapporo
- Christ Church Cathedral, Sendai
- St. Matthew's Cathedral, Maebashi
- St. Andrew's Cathedral, Tokyo
- St Andrew's Cathedral in Yokohama
- St. Matthew's Cathedral in Nagoya
- Cathedral Church of St. Agnes in Kyoto
- Kawaguchi Christ Church Cathedral in Osaka
- St. Michael's Cathedral in Kobe
- St. Paul's Cathedral in Fukuoka
- Cathedral of St. Peter and St. Paul in Naha
- St. Matthias' Cathedral in Maebashi

== See also ==
- List of cathedrals
- Christianity in Japan
