= Charles S. Reifsnider =

20th-century American Anglican bishop

The Rt Revd Charles S. Reifsnider
- Missionary, Bishop of North Tokyo
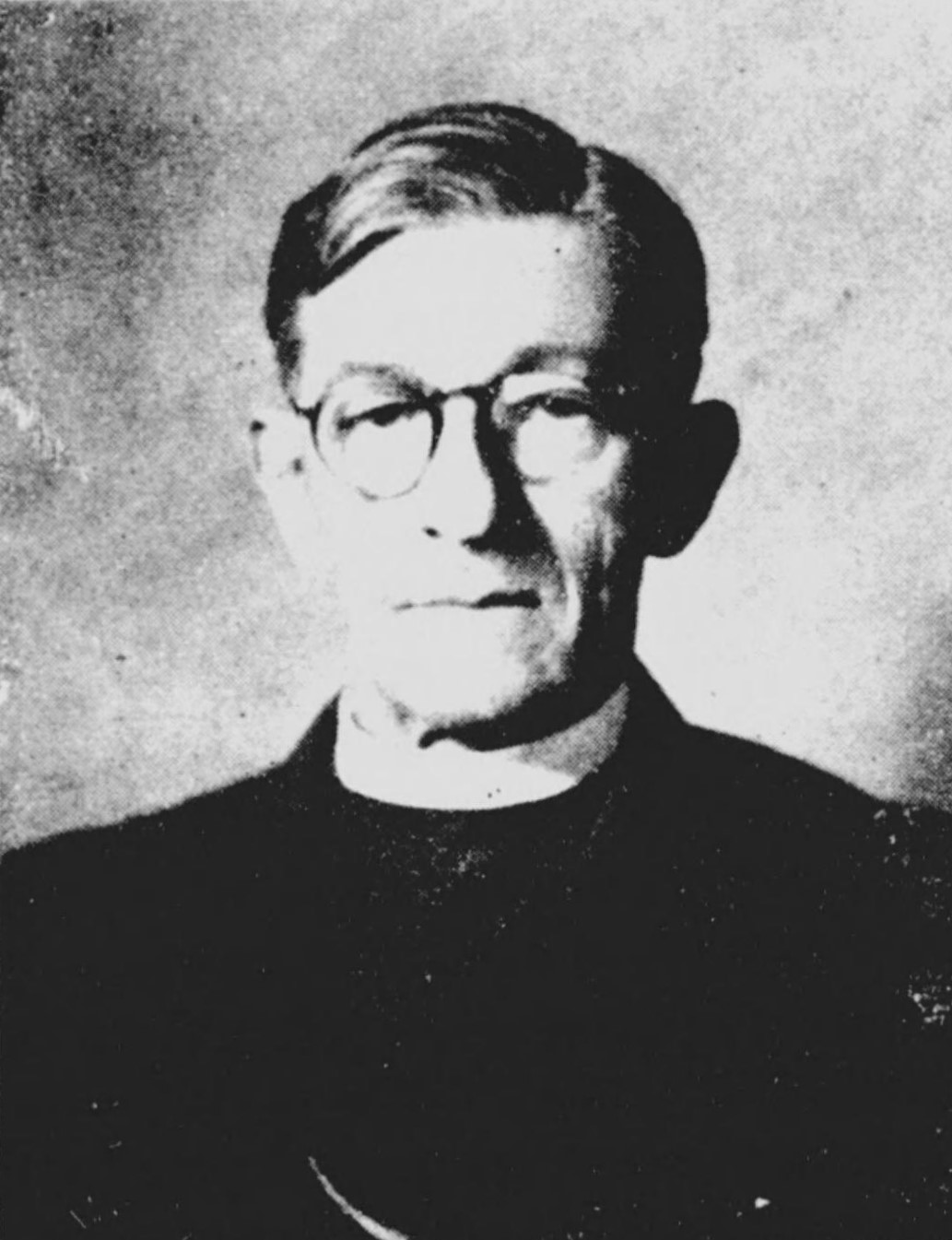
- Bishop Charles S. Reifsnider
- Province: Anglican Church in Japan

Personal details
- Born: 27 November 1875 Frederick, Maryland
- Died: 16 March 1958 (aged 82) Pasadena, California
- Education: Kenyon College

Charles Shriver Reifsnider (November 27, 1875 – March 16, 1958) was the Anglican bishop of North Tokyo in the Nippon Sei Ko Kai from 1935 to 1940. During his mission years in Japan from 1904 to 1941 he also served as the President of Rikkyo University from 1912 to 1940.

== Early life and career ==
Reifsnider was born November 27, 1875, in Frederick, Maryland, the son of Charles David Reifsnider (1847-1915) and Elizabeth Shriver (1852-1937). His grandfather was the Union General, Edward Shriver. Reifsnider was educated at Heidelberg University, and Bexley Hall seminary, graduating from Kenyon College prior ordination in 1901.

Reifsnider served as an Anglican missionary in Japan under the auspices of the Domestic and Foreign Missionary Society of the Episcopal Church. He served as suffragan bishop of North Tokyo from 1924 to 1935, and on Bishop McKim's retirement, as bishop for the same diocese from 1935 to 1940. As well as serving as President of Rikkyo University he also served as President of St. Margaret's College from 1935 to 1941.

Apart from his church mission and educational work, Reifsnider was noted for his outspoken criticism of the Immigration Act of 1924 that imposed quotas on Japanese immigration into the United States.

In the early 1930s Reifsnider was also reported as being initially supportive of the Japanese invasion of Manchuria, arguing that what Japan had done in Manchuria should be likened to French actions in Morocco, Italian actions in Tripoli and US actions in Panama.

In 1942, following the expulsion of non-Japanese missionaries from Japan and the outbreak of hostilities after the Attack on Pearl Harbor, Reifsnider was appointed by Presiding Bishop Henry St. George Tucker to oversee the nine Japanese-American congregations in the Episcopal Church USA. Reifsnider, through church ministry and a combination of organizational and political skill, did much to support Japanese Episcopal church leaders and their congregations interned during the war under Executive Order 9066.

Reifsnider retired from formal church ministry in 1947 and died in Pasadena, California, on March 16, 1958.
