= Peter Yonetaro Matsui =

The Rt Revd Peter Yonetaro Matsui
- Bishop of Tokyo
- Province: Anglican Church in Japan

Personal details
- Born: May 24, 1869 Japan
- Died: 16 October 1946 (aged 77) Japan

Rt. Revd. Peter Yonetaro Matsui (松井 米太郎) D.D. (died October 16, 1946) was an Anglican bishop of the Diocese of Tokyo, in the Nippon Sei Ko Kai, the Province of the Anglican Communion in Japan.

Studied for two years at Wycliffe College, Toronto

President of Rikkyo University, Tokyo from October 1940 to January 1943.

Supported the controversial position of Bishop John Yasutaro Naide as the Nippon Sei Ko Kai debated its future direction and leadership during the late 1930s and early 1940s. Was replaced as Bishop of Tokyo by Paul Shinji Sasaki in January 1944.

== See also ==
- Anglican Church in Japan
- Paul Shinji Sasaki
