= James Uno =

Japanese Anglican bishop

James Toru Uno was the Anglican Bishop of Osaka prior to the consecration of Samuel Osamu Onishi in September 2008.
