= Samuel Heaslett =

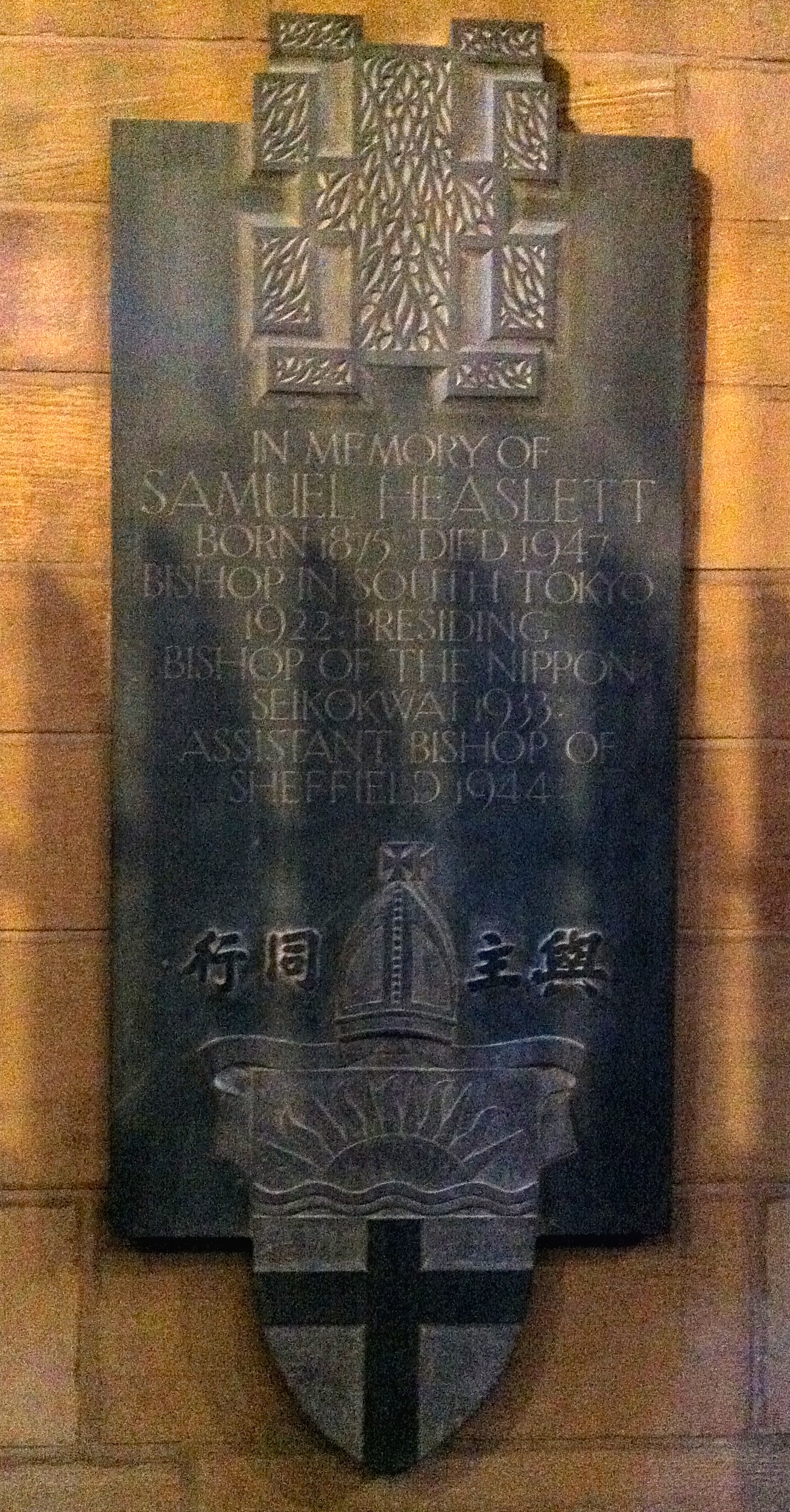
Memorial in Sheffield Cathedral

Samuel Heaslett (1875–1947) was an Anglican bishop.

He was born in Belfast in 1875 and educated at Durham University, where he obtained a First Class degree in theology. Ordained in 1900 he began his overseas mission career in the service of the Anglican Church in Japan as a tutor at Osaka Divinity School, after which he was a missionary in Tokushima then a professor at Central Theological College, Tokyo before elevation to the episcopate as the 4th bishop of South Tokyo a post he held until he was arrested and imprisoned by the Japanese wartime authorities shortly after the attack on Pearl Harbor in December 1941. Concurrent with his role as Bishop of South Tokyo, Heaslett also served as the presiding bishop of the Nippon Sei Ko Kai from 1933 to 1940.

Deported from Japan after four months, Heaslett retired to England and became an assistant bishop of Sheffield.

Heaslett, along with Charles S. Reifsnider, a bishop of the US Episcopal Church, returned briefly to Japan in May and June 1946 as a part of a mission sent by Geoffrey Fisher, Archbishop of Canterbury, to show support for the Nippon Sei Ko Kai in its efforts to renew and rebuild at the end of the Second World War.

Heaslett died on 16 October 1947.

Religious titles
Preceded by Cecil Boutflower	Bishop of South Tokyo; 1921 – 1941	Succeeded by Todomu Sugai
