= St. Matthew's Church Cathedral, Nagoya =

Anglican cathedral in Japan

Coordinates: 35°8′48.63″N 136°55′57.96″E

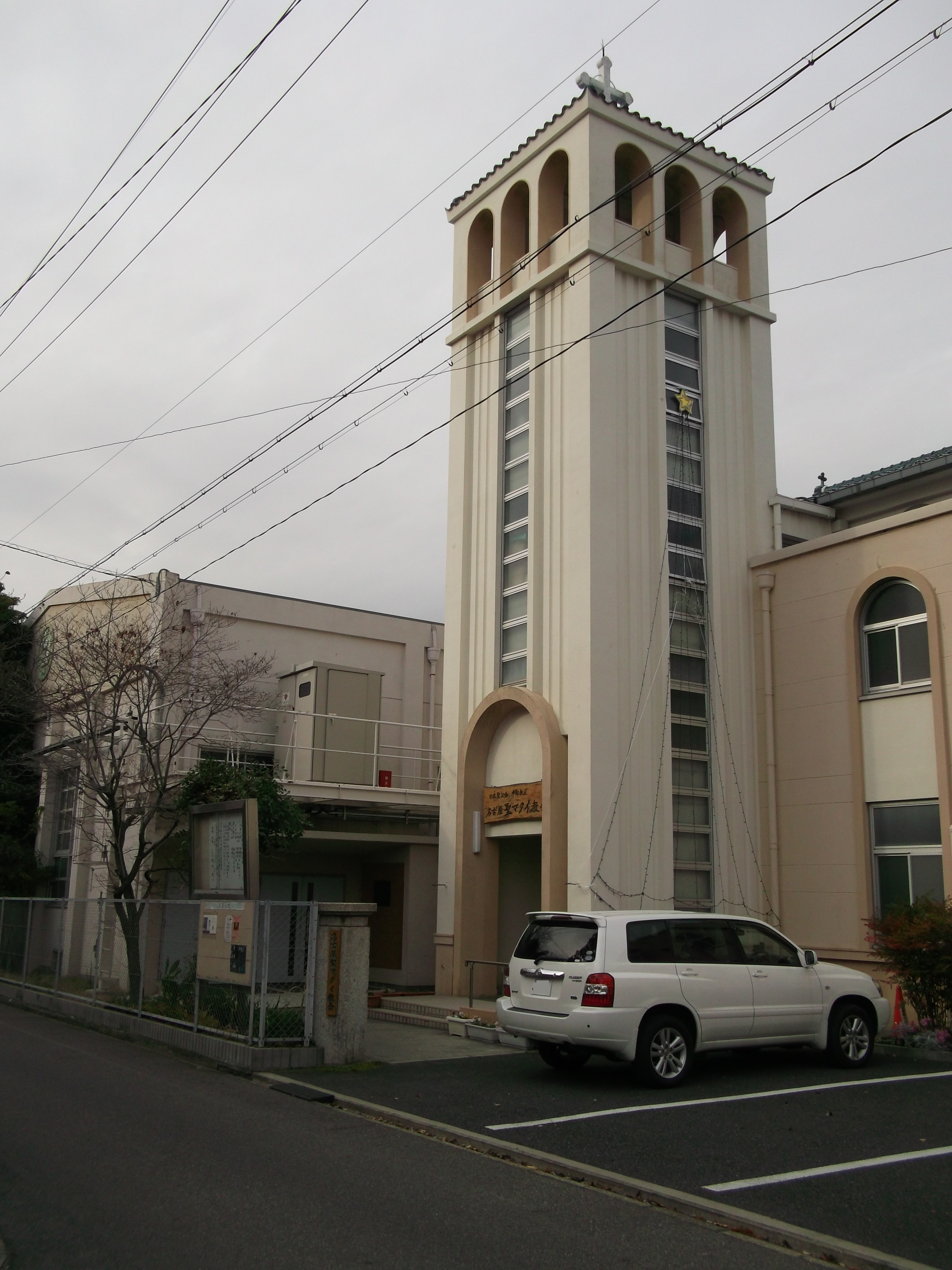
St. Matthew's Cathedral in Nagoya, Japan

St. Matthew's Cathedral, located in Showa-ku, Aichi, Japan, is the diocesan cathedral of the Diocese of Chubu of the Anglican Church in Japan, covering the parishes in the four prefectures of the Chubu Region (Central Japan): Aichi, Gifu, Nagano, and Niigata.

For historical reasons, the parishes in Fukui, Ishikawa and Toyama Prefectures of Japan's Chubu Region belong to the Diocese of Kyoto, while those in Yamanashi and Shizuoka Prefectures, to the Diocese of Yokohama.

== Diocese of Chubu ==
The Anglican activities in Central Japan of Aichi, Gifu, Nagano, and Niigata prefectures began in 1873 when the Canadian Alexander Croft Shaw of the Society for the Propagation of the Gospel (SPG) came to Japan as a missionary, and visited Karuizawa, Nagano, for vacationing in 1886, and started his missionary activities there in 1886. He later visited Nagoya, Gifu, and Nagano himself, and later also sent Canadian missionaries, thus laying the foundations of the Diocese of Chubu. In 1875, the missionary P.K. Fyson (later the first bishop of the Diocese of Hokkaido) from England lived in Niigata, followed the Canadian priest J.C. Robinson who lived in Nagoya, and A.F. Chapel from England, who lived in Gifu in 1890.

In 1912, the Anglican Church of Canada ordained in Montreal H.J. Hamilton as the first bishop of the Diocese of Chubu of the Anglican Church in Japan. In the following year, a large conference was held in Nagoya, formally establishing the Diocese of Chubu, for the parishes in Aichi, Gifu, Nagano, and Niigata Prefectures. Thus, the churches in the diocese developed in close relationship with the Anglican Church of Canada.

The diocese experienced the evacuation of foreigners during World War II. After the war, there are now 26 churches and other related facilities, such as a junior college (St. Mary's College, Nagoya), kindergartens, and hospitals.

The bishop of the Diocese of Chubu is the Rt. Rev'd Dr. Renta Nishihara (西原廉太), since October 2020.

== St. Matthew's Church ==
St. Matthew's Church, Nagoya, was established in 1950, as the church cathedral of the Diocese of Chubu of the Anglican Church in Japan. The current church building was constructed in 1960 in the style similar to the Basilica of Saint Francis of Assisi. It houses the parish center of the Diocese of Chubu, and is also used as the chapel of the adjacent St. Mary's College, Nagoya.

The address of St. Matthew's Church Cathedral is at 2-53-1 Meigetsu-cho, Showa-ku, Nagoya, Aichi Prefecture. The current rector is the Rev'd Ambrosia Kaori Goto (後藤香織).

== See also ==
- Nippon Sei Ko Kai
