= NSKK =

NSKK may stand for:

- National Socialist Motor Corps (Nationalsozialistisches Kraftfahrkorps)
- Nippon Sei Ko Kai, the Anglican Church in Japan
