= Henry St. George Tucker (bishop) =

20th-century American Episcopal Church bishop

The Most Reverend Henry St. George Tucker
- 19th Presiding Bishop of the Episcopal Church
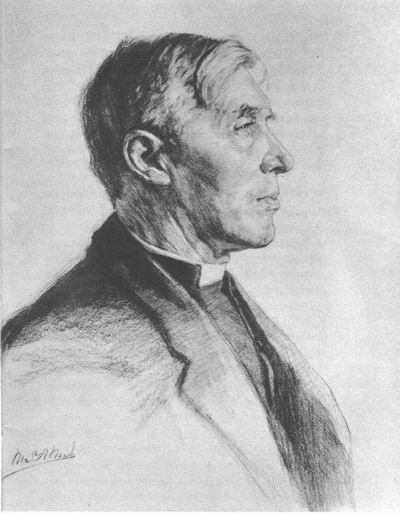
- Church: Episcopal Church
- Elected: October 1937
- In office: 1938–1946
- Predecessor: James De Wolf Perry
- Successor: Henry Knox Sherrill
- Other post: Bishop of Virginia (1927–1943)
- Previous posts: Bishop of Osaka (1912–1923); Coadjutor Bishop of Virginia (1926–1927)

Orders
- Ordination: July 30, 1900 by Alfred Magill Randolph
- Consecration: March 25, 1912 by John McKim

Personal details
- Born: July 16, 1874 Warsaw, Virginia, United States
- Died: 8 August 1959 (aged 85) Richmond, Virginia, United States
- Buried: Virginia Theological Seminary
- Denomination: Anglican
- Parents: Beverley D. Tucker & Anna Maria Washington
- Spouse: Lilian Warnock
- Children: 2

Henry St. George Tucker (July 16, 1874 – August 8, 1959) was the 19th Presiding Bishop of the Episcopal Church in the United States of America.

== Early life and career ==
Tucker's parents were Episcopal priest, and later Bishop of Southern Virginia, Beverley Dandridge Tucker, and Anna Maria Washington (Tucker). Tucker was descended from St. George Tucker of Williamsburg. He was educated at the University of Virginia, graduating with a BA and MA in 1895. His field was mathematics. Thereafter he studied at the Protestant Episcopal Theological Seminary in Alexandria, Virginia, graduating as a Bachelor of Divinity and subsequently being ordained to the priesthood on July 30, 1900.

First arriving in 1899, Tucker served for twenty four years as a missionary in the Nippon Sei Ko Kai, the Anglican Church in Japan. He served alongside the British Anglican Hugh James Foss, as joint bishop of the Osaka diocese, and later in 1913 was appointed Bishop of Kyoto. In 1903 he became President of St. Paul's College in Tokyo, an establishment that in 1922 gained formal recognition as Rikkyo University.

During 1918 Tucker worked alongside lay medical missionary Rudolf Teusler in Siberia supervising civilian relief work under the auspices of the Red Cross. During this period Tucker also held the rank of major in the Allied Expeditionary Force.

== Bishop ==
In 1923 Tucker returned to the United States, becoming both Professor of Pastoral Theology at Virginia Theological Seminary and bishop coadjutor of the Episcopal Diocese of Virginia. Succeeding as Bishop of Virginia in 1927, Tucker eventually became the Presiding Bishop of the Episcopal Church in the United States of America, thus becoming the leader of all Episcopalians in the United States. At the 1940 General Convention, he preached against "aggressive nationalism" and asked the bishops to refrain from smoking during sessions. As an Episcopal presiding bishop, St. George Tucker is honored with a window in the Washington National Cathedral. He was the first bishop to hold this position full-time, rather than on top of a continuing diocesan appointment.

Tucker also authored a book on the history, growth, and development of the Episcopal Church in Japan.

Episcopal Church (USA) titles
| Preceded by James DeWolf Perry | 19th Presiding Bishop; 1938–1946 | Succeeded by Henry Knox Sherrill |
| Preceded by William Awdry | Joint Bishop of Osaka; 1912–1923 | Succeeded by John Yasutaro Naide |
