= Charles Calveley Foss =

Recipient of the Victoria Cross

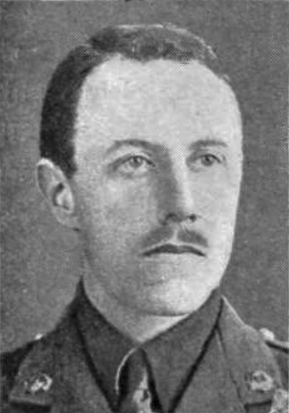
- Born: 9 March 1885; Kobe, Japan
- Died: 9 April 1953 (aged 68); London
- Burial place: West Hill Cemetery, Winchester
- Military career
- Allegiance: United Kingdom
- Branch: British Army
- Rank: Brigadier
- Units: Bedfordshire Regiment; Home Guard
- Conflicts: First World War: First Battle of Ypres; Battle of Neuve Chapelle; Second World War
- Awards: Victoria Cross; Order of the Bath; Distinguished Service Order

Brigadier Charles Calveley Foss, VC, CB, DSO (9 March 1885 – 9 April 1953) was an English recipient of the Victoria Cross (VC), the highest and most prestigious award for gallantry in the face of the enemy that can be awarded to British and Commonwealth forces. A professional soldier in the British Army, he was awarded the VC in 1915 for his actions during the Battle of Neuve Chapelle.

== Early life ==
Charles Foss was born on 9 March 1885 in Kobe, Japan. His father, Reverend Hugh James Foss, was the Bishop of Osaka. His mother, from Chester, died when he was around the age of nine. He was educated in England, where he attended Marlborough College. In 1904, he was commissioned into the British Army's Bedfordshire Regiment having spent the two years prior at the Royal Military College at Sandhurst in Berkshire. Posted to the regiment's 2nd Battalion, in 1912 he was promoted to captain.

== First World War ==
On the outbreak of the First World War, Foss was serving in South Africa as adjutant of his battalion. The battalion was shortly dispatched to the Western Front, arriving at Zeebrugge in early October 1914, as part of the 21st Brigade, 7th Division, and fought in the First Battle of Ypres later that month. By the time of the battalion's withdrawal from the frontline in early November, he was the senior surviving frontline officer. The following year he was awarded the Distinguished Service Order (DSO) in recognition of his service at Ypres.

In early March 1915, the 7th Division was tasked with a role in the Battle of Neuve Chapelle. Foss' battalion advanced to the northwest of Neuve Chapelle on the opening day of the battle, 10 March, in support of the Royal Scots Fusiliers to the east. They held their position for the following day but on 12 March the neighbouring Royal Scots Fusiliers had to fend off an attack on their trenches by the Germans. A section of their trenches were lost. Foss led a group of men with handheld bombs on a flanking raid and was able to recapture the lost trench. It was during this raid that he performed the deed for which he was awarded the Victoria Cross (VC). The VC, instituted in 1856, was the highest award for valour that could be bestowed on a soldier of the British Empire. The citation reads as follows:

"For most conspicuous bravery at Neuve Chapelle on 12th March 1915. After the enemy had captured a part of one of our trenches, and our counter-attack made with one officer and twenty men having failed (all but two of the party being killed or wounded in the attempt), Captain Foss, on his own initiative, dashed forward with eight men, under heavy fire, attacked the enemy with bombs, and captured the position, including the 52 Germans occupying it. The capture of this position from the enemy was of the greatest importance, and the utmost bravery was displayed in essaying the task with so very few men."

— London Gazette, 20 August 1915

Of the men who accompanied Foss during his attack, several were recognised with gallantry decorations; one, Private William Eade, was awarded the Distinguished Conduct Medal and the Order of St George. Sergeant William Peggs was also awarded the Order of St George while a third man, Private Walter Scrivener, killed the day after Foss's action, was mentioned in despatches.

The 2nd Battalion was withdrawn from the frontline on 14 March. Later in the year Foss was married to Vere Katherine née Pollard, the widow of an Indian Army officer. By the time of the gazetting of his VC, Foss was serving as the brigade major of the Bedfordshire Regiment. While King George V was on an inspection tour of the 7th Division on 28 October 1915, he presented the VC to Foss.

Shortly afterwards Foss was appointed a brigade major of the 7th Division's 20th Infantry Brigade. At the end of the year, he was mentioned in despatches, the first of five such mentions during the course of the war. Later, having been promoted to major, he was on the staff of the 2nd, then 1st Canadian Divisions, and finally the Canadian Corps. During this time he was awarded the Order of Danilo 4th Class (Montenegro). In 1918, he instructed at a staff school in Cambridge before returning to the Western Front shortly before the end of the war with a British infantry corps.

== Later life ==
At the conclusion of hostilities, Foss was promoted to brevet lieutenant colonel and appointed chief of staff at the 57th Division and remained in this position into 1919, at which time he went to the Staff College at Camberley for further training. He graduated the following year. He spent five years at the War Office before being given command of the King's Liverpool Regiment.

On 29 October 1933 he was promoted to colonel, with seniority backdated to 1 January 1923, and posted to Burma as commander of the Rangoon Brigade Area. He was also appointed as aide-de-camp to King George V, taking over from Brigadier Victor Fortune. He was appointed a Companion of the Order of the Bath (CB) in the 1937 New Year Honours. He retired the same year having achieved the rank of brigadier.

During the Second World War, he was a member of the home guard in Bedfordshire and also commandant of the Bedfordshire Army Cadet Force. In 1943 he was appointed a deputy lieutenant of Bedfordshire. He died on 9 April 1953 in London, survived by his second wife who he had married in 1950. His first wife had died in 1947. He is buried in West Hill Cemetery at Winchester in Hampshire.

== Medals ==
Foss' medals, which in addition to the VC, CB and DSO, included the 1914 Star with Mons clasp, the British War Medal, Victory Medal with Mentioned in Despatches oak leaf, Defence Medal, War Medal 1939–1945, George VI Coronation Medal and the Order of Danilo 4th Class (Montenegro) are displayed at the Bedfordshire and Hertfordshire Regimental Gallery at the Wardown Park Museum in Luton, Bedfordshire.
