= Hugh Foss (bishop) =

Anglican bishop (1848–1932)

The Right Reverend Hugh James Foss DD
- Bishop of Osaka
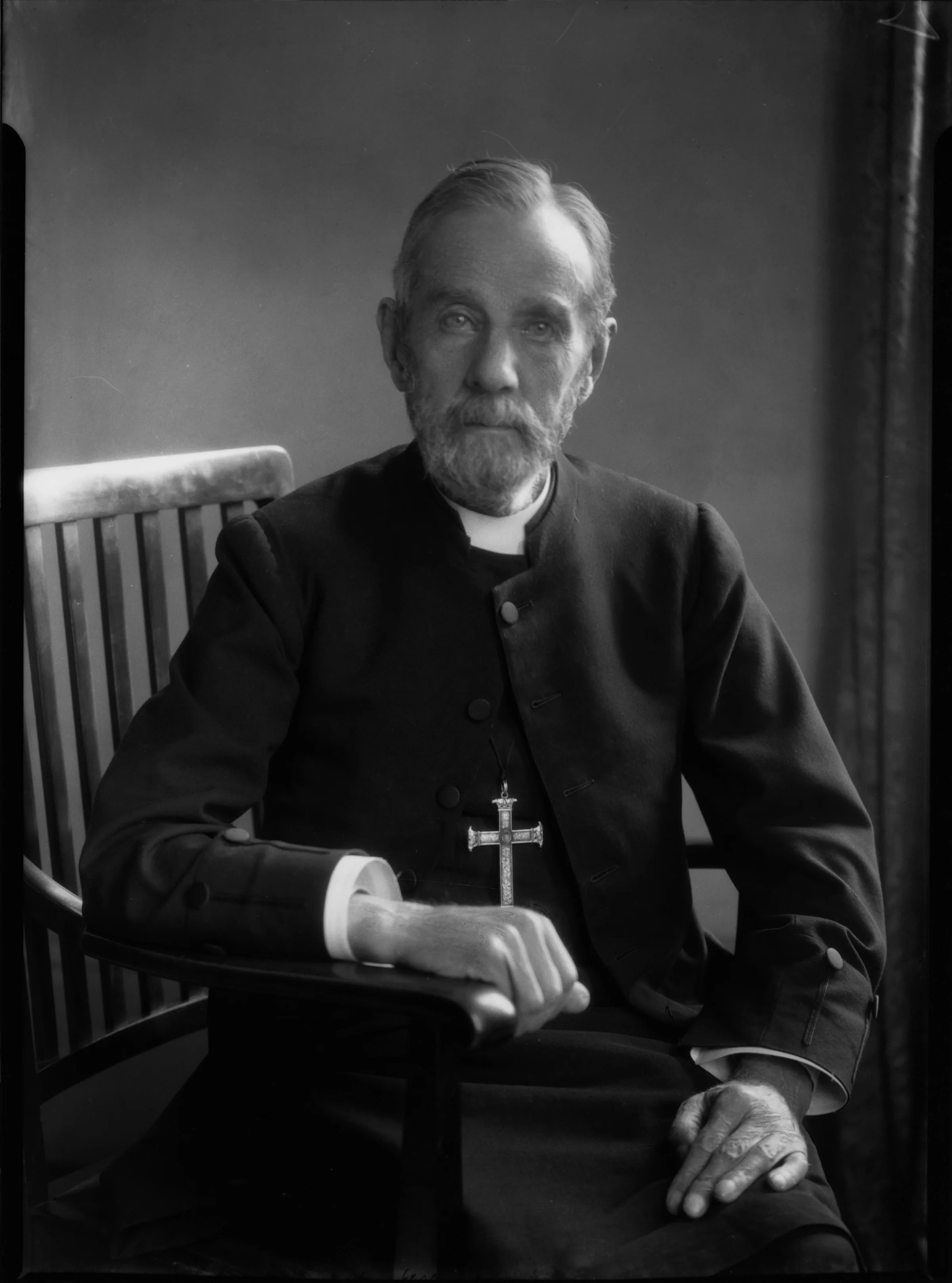
- Foss in 1927
- Church: Anglican Church in Japan
- Diocese: Osaka
- In office: 1899–1923
- Predecessor: William Awdry
- Successor: John Yasutaro Naide

Orders
- Ordination: 1872 (deacon), 1873 (priest)
- Consecration: 1899

Personal details
- Born: June 25, 1848 Petham, Kent, England
- Died: March 24, 1932 (aged 83) Winchester, Hampshire, England
- Spouse: Janet McEwen (m. 1880–d. 1894); Lina Janet Ovans (m. 1901)
- Children: Charles Calveley Foss VC; Hugh Foss (cryptanalyst)
- Education: Marlborough College; Christ's College, Cambridge (BA 1871, MA 1874)

Hugh James Foss DD (25 June 1848 – 24 March 1932) was an Anglican bishop, the second Bishop of Osaka.

Hugh James Foss was born at Petham, Kent into a legal family: his father was Edward Foss, author of The Judges of England. He was educated at Marlborough College and Christ's College, Cambridge, receiving his B.A. degree in 1871 and his M.A. degree in 1874. Ordained deacon in 1872 and priest in 1873, he spent a three-year curacy in Liverpool before emigrating to Kobe and establishing the St. Michael's church three years later. He spent the rest of his ministry there, amongst other achievements translating The Imitation of Christ by Thomas à Kempis into the vernacular.

On 2 February 1899, Foss was consecrated Lord Bishop of Osaka by Archbishop of Canterbury Frederick Temple in Westminster Abbey with the assistance of eight other Anglican bishops. Upon his elevation to the episcopacy, he was conferred an honorary D.D. degree by the University of Cambridge. In 1923, Foss resigned from his position and moved to Chilcomb Lodge in Winchester, Hampshire. He died on 24 March 1932.

In 1880, Foss married Janet McEwen, the daughter of Dr. William McEwen of Chester. Their son Charles Calveley Foss was awarded the Victoria Cross in the First World War. After his first wife's death in 1894, Foss remarried, on 24 July 1901 in Kobe, with Lina Janet Ovans, daughter of John Lambert Ovans of Surrey. Their son Hugh Foss was a cryptanalyst for the Government Code and Cypher School at Bletchley Park during the Second World War where he headed the Japanese section.

== Notes ==
Church of England titles
Preceded by William Awdry	Bishop of Osaka; 1899 –1923	Succeeded by John Yasutaro Naide
