= Philip Fyson =

English Anglican bishop (1846–1928)

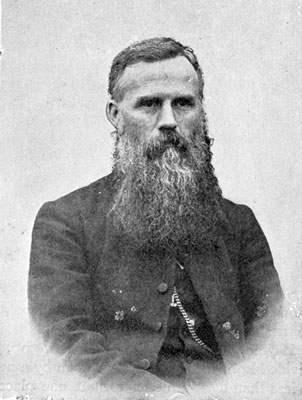
"The Right Rev. Bishop Fyson" in a 1902 publication

Philip Kemball Fyson (21 January 1846, Higham, Suffolk – 30 January 1928, Sutton Valence) was an Anglican bishop of the Diocese of Hokkaido, in the Nippon Sei Ko Kai, the province of the Anglican Communion in Japan.

== Life ==
Philip Kemball Fyson was the son of Edward Fyson, a farmer. He was educated at King Edward VI School in Bury St Edmunds and Christ's College, Cambridge, graduating B.A. in Classics with first class honours (1870) and Theology (1871). He prepared for ordination at the Church Missionary Society College, Islington. He began missionary work with the Church Missionary Society in Japan in 1874 at Yokohama,. Fyson began his career in Japan in Niigata. Some years later he went to Tokyo, Osaka then Yokohama. He was popular with both European and Japanese contacts and in 1896 was appointed Bishop of Hokkaido. The Rev John Batchelor‘s 1902 book concerning the Ainu people of Yezo (or Ezo) includes a photograph of a devotional meeting in 1899 where Bishop Fyson sits amidst his Japanese, Ainu and European attendees.

Fyson was in January 1903 granted the degree Doctor of Divinity honoris causa from the University of Cambridge.

Returning to England in 1908, Fyson was Vicar of Elmley Lovett, Worcestershire from 1908 until 1925. The appointment of the rectory in the parish was in the gift of Fyson's old college, Christ's at Cambridge.

Fyson was said to have become more fluent in Japanese than English. He translated much of the Old Testament into Japanese, and was very active in the preparation of the Japanese Prayer-Book.
