= Joseph Sakunoshin Motoda =

Japanese Anglican bishop (1862–1928)

The Right Reverend Joseph Sakunoshin Motoda
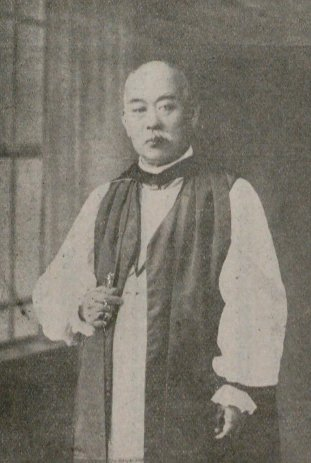

Personal details
- Born: 22 February 1862 Kurume, Fukuoka, Japan
- Died: 16 April 1928 (aged 66) Tokyo, Japan

The Right Reverend Joseph Sakunoshin Motoda (22 February 1862 – 16 April 1928, 元田 作之進) was the first Japanese born Bishop of Tokyo in the Nippon Sei Ko Kai, the Anglican Church in Japan.

== Education and Church Ministry ==
Joseph Sakunoshin Motoda was ordained in America in 1893. He studied variously at Kenyon College, the University of Pennsylvania and Columbia University. Motoda obtained a Doctorate in Philosophy from the University of Pennsylvania in 1895 and was granted a Doctorate in Divinity from the Philadelphia Divinity School in 1916.

Motoda later became the first person of Japanese heritage to become an Anglican Bishop, when he was consecrated as Bishop of Tokyo on 7 December 1923. Motoda advocated for the education of a native ministry and for an increasingly autonomous national church in Japan.

During the course of his studies and church ministry, Motoda travelled extensively. A frequent visitor to the United States, Motoda also travelled with the Rev. Tasuku Harada in 1905 to India as a guest of the Indian YMCA. During a visit to England in 1928 he preached at Canterbury Cathedral.

Motoda also served as President of St Paul's College, Tokyo.

== See also ==
- Anglican Church in Japan
