= Gordon Walsh (bishop) =

- Walsh, from a 1909 newspaper
- Born: 8 January 1880; Dublin
- Died: 19 November 1971 (aged 91); Ely
- Occupations: Anglican bishop, missionary

Gordon John Walsh (8 January 1880 – 19 November 1971) was an Anglican bishop, born in Dublin. He was Bishop of the Diocese of Hokkaido, in the Nippon Sei Ko Kai, the province of the Anglican Communion in Japan, from 1927 to 1940. From 1942 to 1967 he was Assistant Bishop of Ely.

== Early life and education ==
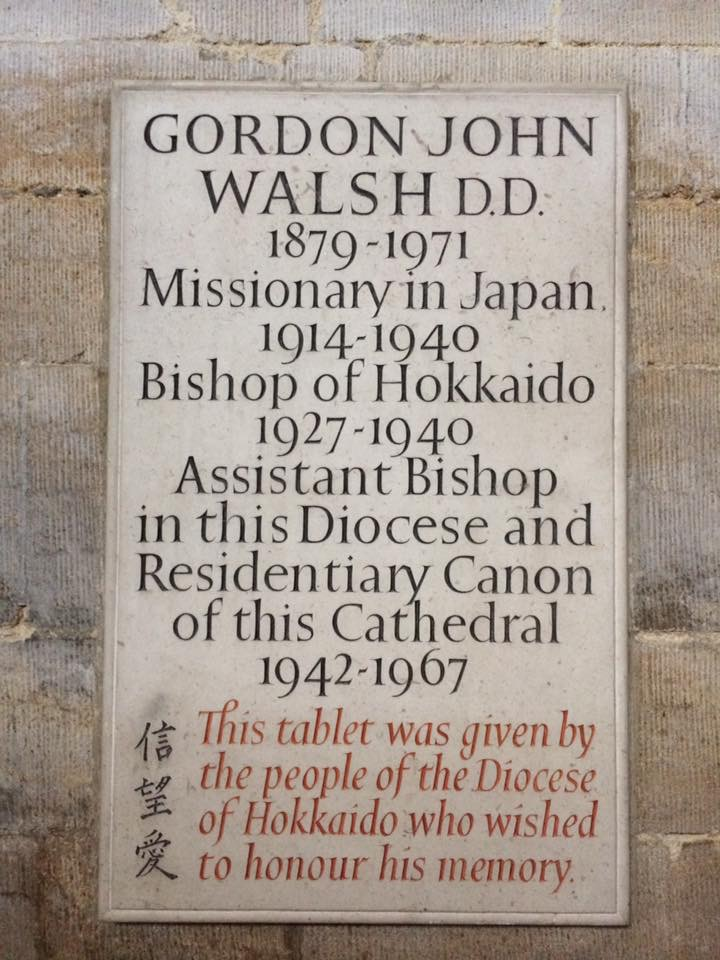
Plaque in Ely cathedral commemorating Gordon John Walsh, Bishop of Hokkaido

Walsh was born in Dublin, the son of John Edward Walsh and Ellen Harriet Frizzell Walsh. His father was a barrister and an accountant. He was educated at Sutton Valence School and Trinity College, Dublin. He was ordained in 1903. In 1909 he married Edythe Eleanor Spence, whose father was John Spence, the Archdeacon of Belfast.

== Career ==
=== In Ireland and Japan ===
Walsh was a curate in Belfast from 1903 to 1909. He was Rector of St Peter, Athlone (now owned by the Catholic Church and known as Corpus Christi Priory) from 1910 to 1913, when he became a CMS missionary. He served at Tokushima, Hakodate and Asahigawa, eventually becoming Bishop of Hokkaido in 1927, serving until 1940. He spoke in Belfast churches about Anglican foreign missions 1927, and in England in 1935.

=== In England ===
Walsh returned to England via Canada during World War II. He was Vicar of Eastry and Tilmanstone, Kent from 1941 to 1942. Beginning in 1942 he was a Residentiary Canon of Ely Cathedral and Assistant Bishop of Ely. He promoted "Operation Firm Faith", a denominational campaign in the 1950s to increase church engagement among young families. He was also active in supporting the diocese's outreach to deaf worshippers. In 1970, he was considered the oldest Bishop in the UK.

Walsh's wife died in 1956, and he died in 1971, at age 92, in Ely. Geoffrey Hugo Lampe spoke at Walsh's memorial service.
