= Light Maekawa =

Bishop of Hokkaido

The Right Reverend Light Shinjiro Maekawa
- Bishop of Hokkaido
- Church: Nippon Sei Ko Kai
- Diocese: Diocese of Hokkaido

Orders
- Consecration: 1941

Personal details
- Denomination: Anglican

Dr Light Shinjiro Maekawa is a former Bishop of Hokkaido in the Nippon Sei Ko Kai. He was consecrated between August and September 1941 with three other Japanese bishops following the withdrawal of Western bishops.

During the Second World War, he opposed the forcible merger of Japanese Protestant churches into the United Church of Christ in Japan.

In 1950 Dr Maekawa sent bamboo crosses to the parishes of all the Martyrs of New Guinea as an act of reconciliation and repentance.

== See also ==
- Anglican Church in Japan
