= St. Barnabas' Hospital (Osaka) =

Geography
- Location: Tennōji-ku, Osaka, Japan
- Coordinates: 34°39′47″N 135°31′28″E

Organisation
- Funding: Private
- Religious affiliation: Anglican Church in Japan

Services
- Beds: 73

History
- Opened: 1873

Links
- Website: www.barnaba.or.jp

St. Barnabas' Hospital (聖バルナバ病院, Sei Barunaba byōin) is a hospital founded in 1873 that is located in Tennōji-ku, Osaka, Japan. It is the oldest hospital of the Anglican Church in Japan.

== Characteristics ==
The nearest station is Ōsaka Uehommachi Station. The hospital has long been committed to maternal health care and delivers more than 1,000 births a year.

== History ==
1873

- Mar. - Dr. Henry Laning (M. D.) in Syracuse, New York, was appointed as a missionary doctor by the Episcopal Church of the United States.
- Jul. 4th - Dr. Laning arrived at Osaka
- This year he started to provide medical services at his house in Yorikichō, Nishi-ku, Osaka. He also studied Japanese.

1874

- Jan. - US Japan Missionary Clinic was opened at Umehommachi 7, Nishi-ku, Osaka.
- Dr. Laning treated more than a thousand patients for free in the half year after this clinic was opened. He also sold and lent many Christian books in Japanese, in Chinese, and in English.

1877

- Apr. - He established another clinic in the central Osaka, and the first clinic in Umehommachi became a branch.

1878

- He treated about 2.5 thousand patients at those clinics, and the bishop Channing Moore Williams reported his contribution to the headquarter in the United States.

1880

- Laning's medical works successfully developed, and doctors of the clinics argued to build a hospital in Osaka. They asked the US headquarter to send money for the hospital, and female working groups in New York promised to send money for the project.

1883

- Sep. - A new two-story hospital made by wood was completed at Kawaguchi-cho 8, and Dr. Laning became a president of the hospital. He officially named the hospital "St. Barnabas' hospital." A missionary of the US Episcopal Church, Theodosius Stevens Tyng supervised the construction of the hospital.

1884

- Apr. - Frances J. Shaw living in Osaka was recruited as a chief nurse. This position was assigned to foreign women after several years.

1885

- Jun. - Shaw resigned the hospital. The number of personnels from the mission decreased, but staff staying the hospital kept their effort and the hospital was successfully developed.
- 920 patients visited the hospital for 4,869 times, and 74 patients stayed at the hospital this year.

1887

- The number of patients of the hospital and another clinic in Tokyo (later St. Luke's International Hospital) smoothly increased.

1888

- The number of visiting patients increased to 8,224, and 88 patients stayed at the hospital this year.

1913

- Dr. Laning who had worked in Japan for almost 40 years returned to the United States because he got old, and his son became the second president of the hospital.

1923

- The hospital moved to Saikudani, Tennōji.

1928

- The main building designed by William Merrell Vories was completed.

1941

- Shōzō Nisizaki became the seventh president of the hospital as the first Japanese president.

1942

- An affiliated midwife school, "Jōnan Midwife School" was established.

1943

- The hospital's name changed to "Osaka Daitōa Hospital" because of the war.

1945

- The name returned to "St. Barnabas' Hospital," and the affiliated school renamed "St. Barnabas' Hospital Midwife School."

2005

- The new hospital building was completed.

== Medical Department ==
- Obstetrics
- Gynecology
- Pediatrics

== Access ==
- 10 minutes walk from Ōsaka Uehommachi Station
- 15 minutes walk from Tsuruhashi Station
- 17 minutes walk from Tanimachi Kyūchōme Station

== See also ==
- St. Luke's International Hospital
