= Christ Church Cathedral, Sendai =

Coordinates: 38°15′54″N 140°52′02″E

Christ Church Cathedral, located in Aoba-ku, Sendai, Japan, is the diocesan cathedral of the Tohoku Diocese of the Anglican Church in Japan, covering the parishes in the six prefectures of the Northeast Japan: Aomori, Iwate, Miyagi, Akita, Yamagata, and Fukushima.

== History ==
The mission of the Episcopal Church of Japan in the Tohoku Region was initiated first in Fukushima Prefecture by a missionary group sent by Bishop John McKim of the Diocese of Kita-Tokyo (now the Diocese of Kita-Kanto). Rev. H.J. Jefferies was sent to Sendai in 1894, followed by the missionary activities, such as the Bible class, sewing class, kindergartens, and Sunday schools.

The church hall was constructed in 1901, and the church building, in 1905. At that time that, N. S. Binstead of the Episcopal Church of U.S.A. was installed as bishop of the Diocese of Tohoku, and the church's congregations doubled in size.

During World War II, the foreign missionaries were forced to leave Japan, and the parishes were closed. However, the emerged from the difficult post-war era and developed into taking the approach to self-sufficiency.

The construction began on the diocesan cathedral, which had been burnt down in the Bombing of Sendai during World War II in 1945, and the new center and the cathedral were completed in 1965. Along with this, the bishop who had moved to Hirosaki, Aomori returned to Sendai. In 1991, a major service celebrating the 100th anniversary of the mission of the Tohoku Diocese was held at the cathedral.

About this time, the church building, built immediately after the war, became noticeably dilapidated, and plans were made to be rebuilt. During the time that followed the Great East Japan Earthquake in March 2011, the church building became one of the disaster response headquarters.

The current church building was completed in 2014, with a big celebration. The entrance of the new cathedral building is on Jozenji-dori (定禅寺通り), which like Aoba-dori (青葉通り), is Sendai's most wellknown avenue, is creasingly used for the municipal concerts and lectures.

== Nowadays ==
The address of Christ's Church in Sendai is at 2-13-15 Kokubun-cho, Aoba-ku, Sendai City, The current rector is the Rev. John Seigen Yagi (八木正言), and the bishop, John Hiromichi Kato (加藤博道).

Sunday worships are at 7:00 am Morning Eucharist, 10:30 am Eucharist, and 10:30 am Sunday School (Children's Worship).

== See also ==
- Nippon Sei Ko Kai
