= St. Andrew's Cathedral (Yokohama) =

Catholic church in Japan

Coordinates: 35°28′35.70″N 139°37′02.48″E

St. Andrew's Cathedral, Yokohama (横浜聖アンデレ教会) is the Cathedral Church of the Yokohama Diocese of the Nippon Sei Ko Kai, the Anglican Church in Japan. The diocese includes all Nippon Sei Ko Kai churches in Chiba, Kanagawa, Shizuoka and Yamanashi prefectures.

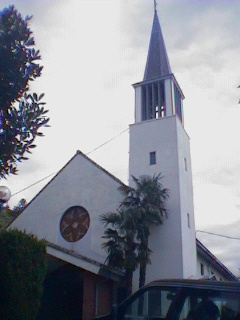
St. Andrew's Cathedral, Yokohama (Front)

== History ==
After the opening of the port of Yokohama in June 1859, Anglicans in the foreign community gathered for worship services in the British Consul's residence. A British Consular chaplain, the Rev. Michael Buckworth Bailey, arrived in August 1862. After a successful fundraising campaign Christ Church, Yokohama, the first Anglican church to be established in the foreign treaty port, was dedicated on 18 October 1863.

St. Andrew's Church congregation first gathered at a rented house in 1885. Since 1885, St. Andrew's Church has moved to a number of locations in Yokohama, and the church buildings were lost twice, in the Kantō Earthquake of 1923 and in the Yokohama Air Raid of May 1945. The present building was consecrated in 1955. Its current address is:

14-5, Mitsusawa Shimo-machi, Kanagawa-ku, Yokohama 221-0852

Archdeacon Alexander Croft Shaw of Canada, who established St. Andrew's Church, Tokyo the first Anglican mission church in the Japanese capital, and the Reverend Walter Weston who promoted alpinism in Japan by climbing the Japan Alps mountains, also served at this church.

== See also ==
- Yokohama
- Anglican Church, Anglican Communion, Nippon Sei Ko Kai, etc.
- St. Andrew's Cathedral, Tokyo
