= St. Margaret's Junior College =

Women's junior college in Tokyo

Coordinates: 35°41′36.2″N 139°35′17.6″E

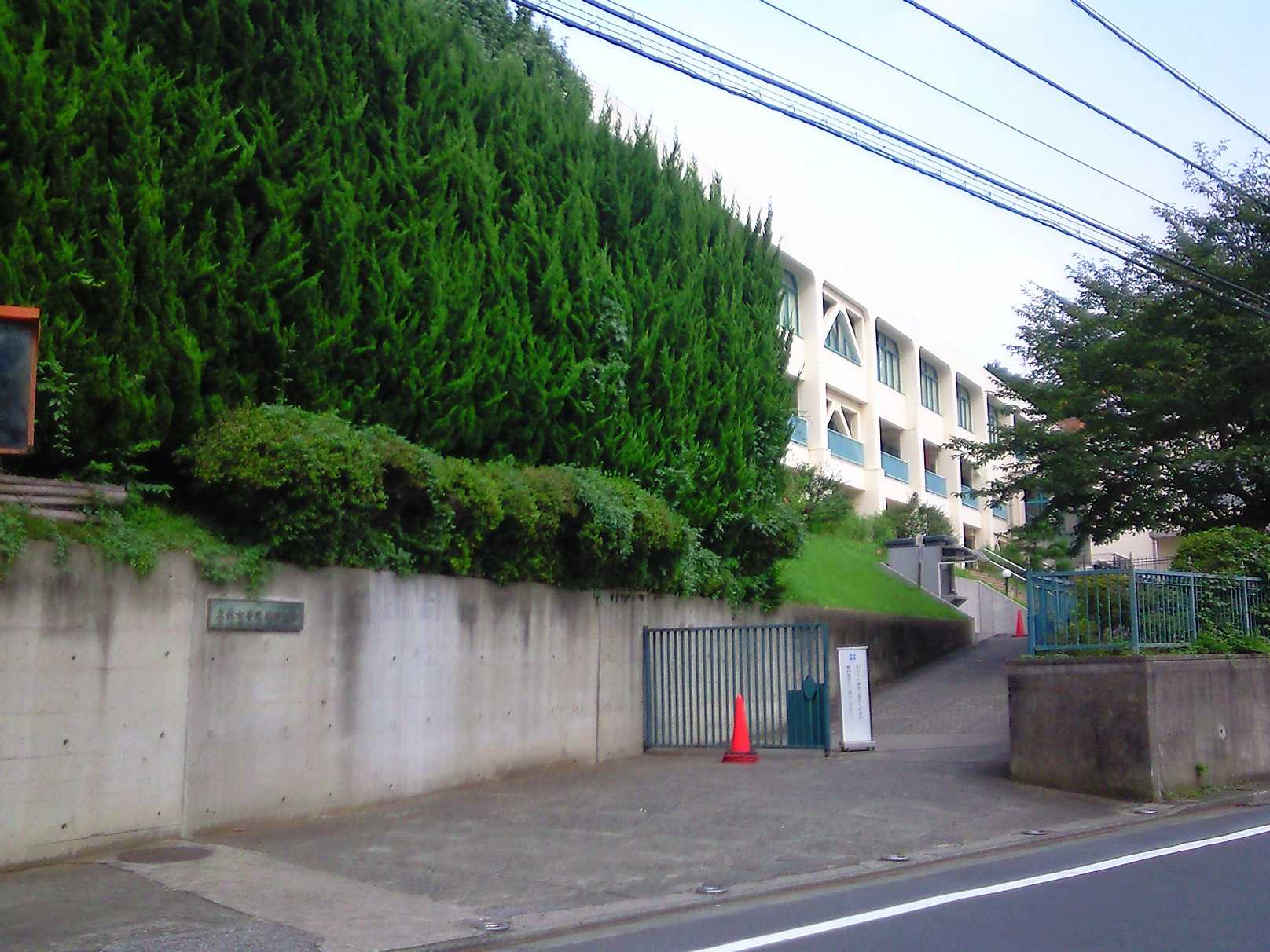
St. Margaret's Junior College

St.Margaret's Junior College (立教女学院短期大学, Rikkyō jogakuin tanki daigaku) was a private women's junior college in Suginami, Tokyo, Japan. It was abolished in 2020.

== History ==
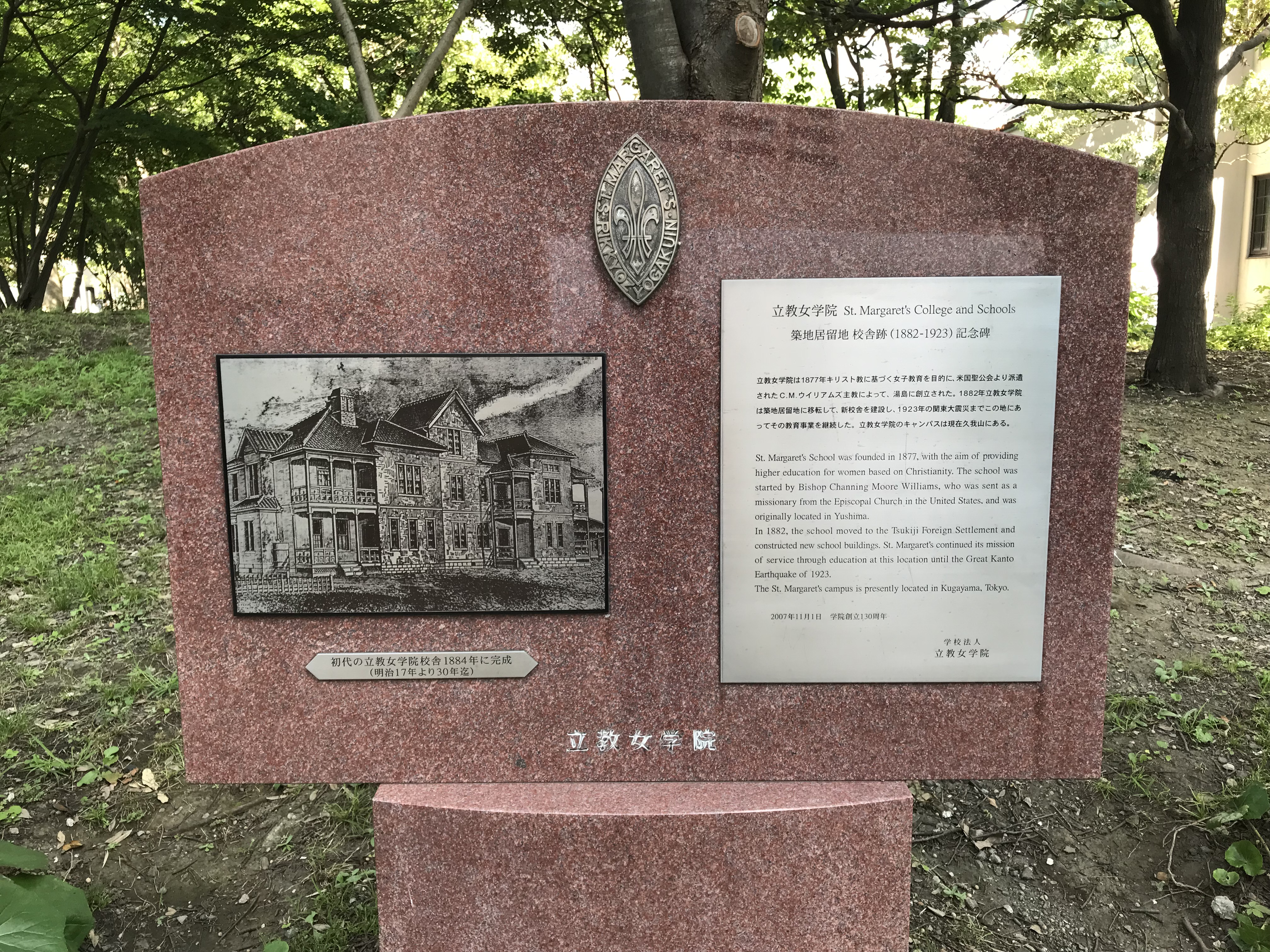
Memorial stone at the school's former site in Akashicho

The precursor of the school was founded by Channing Moore Williams and other Anglican missionaries in Yushima, Bunkyo, Tokyo in 1877. In 1882 the school moved to the Tsukiji foreign settlement (today's Akashicho) close to the current site of St. Luke's International Hospital. It relocated to its present site in Suginami, Tokyo in 1924 after the Great Kantō earthquake.

Named in honor of St. Margaret of Scotland, the college wasclosely affiliated with the Anglican Church in Japan. It was chartered as a two-year junior college in 1967.

== Academics ==
There were two main academic departments focusing on programs in Contemporary Communication and Early Childhood Education.

== Campus ==
The site in Suginami-ku shared extensive grounds, sports, chapel and modern performance facilities with St. Margaret's girls primary, junior and senior high schools. The construction of the historic St. Margaret's Chapel dedicated in 1932 was financed by the Woman's Auxiliary of the Episcopal Church.

== See also ==
- Nippon Sei Ko Kai
- Channing Moore Williams
- Rikkyo University
