= John Yasutaro Naide =

Japanese Anglican bishop

The Rt Revd John Yasutaro Naide
- Bishop of Osaka
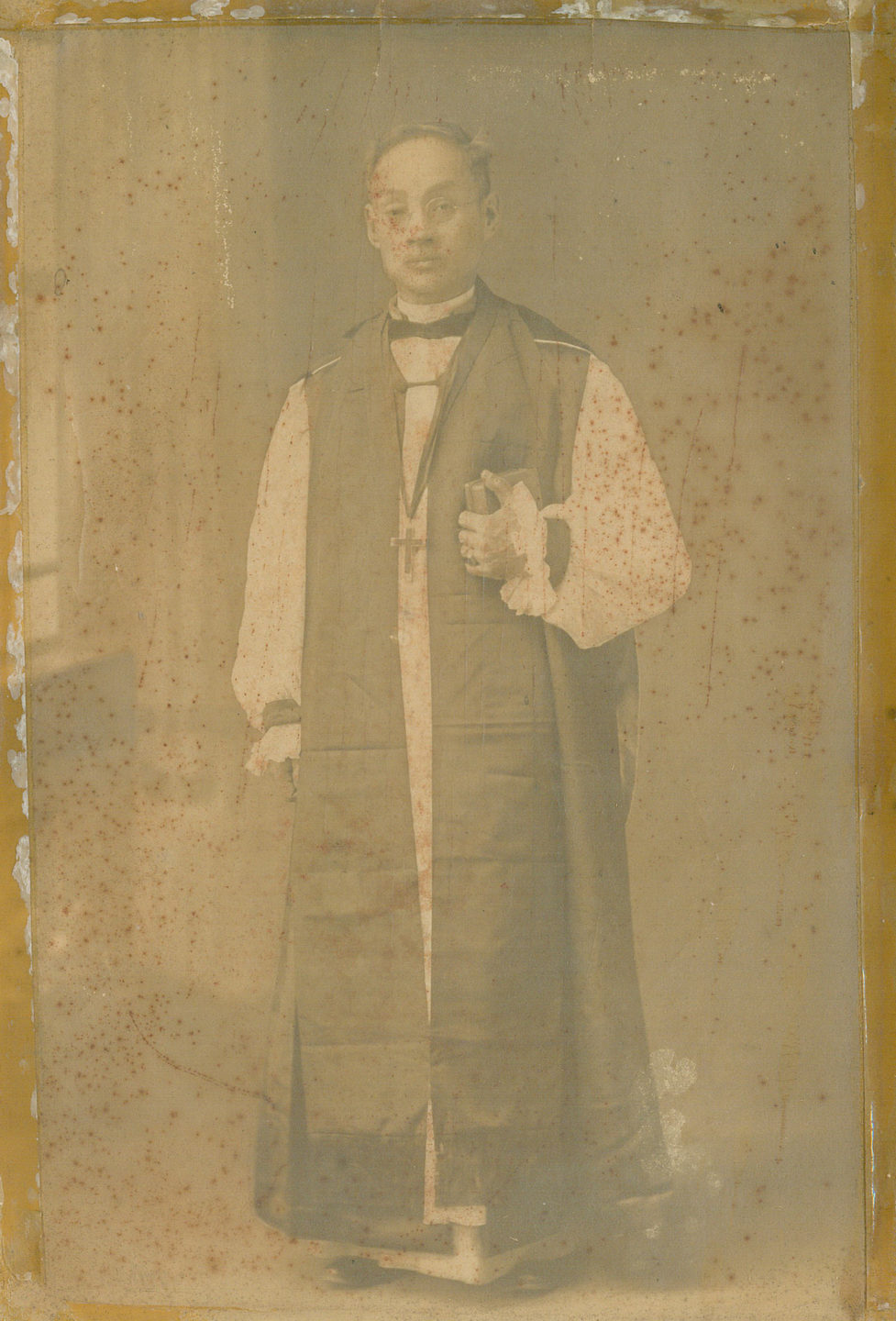
- Province: Anglican Church in Japan

Personal details
- Born: December 22, 1866 Wakayama Prefecture
- Died: 10 October 1945 (aged 78)
- Denomination: Anglican Communion

John Yasutaro Naide (名出 保太郎) D.D. (December 22, 1866 – 1945) was an Anglican bishop of the Diocese of Osaka, in the Nippon Sei Ko Kai, the Province of the Anglican Communion in Japan. He was born in Wakayama Prefecture.

Naide served as a delegate to the first synod of the Anglican Church in Japan in 1887. He was consecrated on December 11, 1923 as one of the first two Japanese bishops in the Nippon Sei Ko Kai and the first Japanese Bishop of Osaka. Naide had previously served as Rector at Kawaguchi Christ Church and of Christ Church, Osaka. As Bishop of Osaka Naide succeeded the joint appointment of an American Episcopalian Henry St. George Tucker and English Anglican Hugh Foss. Bishop Thomas Frank Gailor preached at his consecration.

In 1924 Naide was awarded an honorary Doctor of Divinity degree by the Virginia Theological Seminary. At the House of Bishops meeting in December 1937, Naide was elected chairman of the General Synod and president of the Executive Council of the Nippon Sei Ko Kai.

In October 1942, in the face of Second World War Japanese government pressure for the church to join the Protestant United Church of Christ in Japan or Kyodan, Naide took the controversial decision to dissolve the Nippon Sei Ko Kai in his own diocese, publicly announcing in January 1943 that it had ceased to exist.

Wartime nationalism and government pressure impacted the mission of many Christian churches in Japan during the 1930s and 1940s. Naide maintained his view that the Nippon Sei Ko Kai should be a national Christian church led by a cadre of Japanese bishops, an aim realised in 1947, two years after the end of the war and Naide's death in 1945.

== See also ==
- Anglican Church in Japan
