= Michael Buckworth Bailey =

The Reverend Michael Buckworth Bailey
- Missionary
- Appointed: December 1861
- Retired: 1 April 1873

Orders
- Ordination: deacon in 1854 priest in 1855

Personal details
- Born: 10 April 1852 Kottayam, India
- Died: 6 December 1899 (aged 72) Cold Norton, England
- Parents: Rev. Benjamin Bailey
- Education: Dewsbury, Yorkshire; Sidney Sussex College, Cambridge

Rev. Michael Buckworth Bailey M.A. (10 April 1827 – 6 December 1899) was a minister of the Church of England.

As Consular Chaplain to the British Legation in Yokohama, Bailey was one of the first Anglican priests to serve in Japan.

== Background and early life ==
Born in Kottayam, India in 1827, son of CMS missionary Rev. Benjamin Bailey. Educated in Dewsbury, Yorkshire and at Sidney Sussex College, Cambridge. Ordained deacon in 1854 and priest in 1855, thereafter serving as curate in a number of parishes in and around London.

== Consular Chaplain in Japan ==
Appointed in December 1861 as the first Consular Chaplain to the British Legation in Yokohama. Bailey arrived in Japan in August 1862 and stayed until 1874. Bailey was the appointed priest in charge of Christ Church, Yokohama, one of the first churches to be constructed in the recently opened treaty port.

As well as his church mission work, Bailey was noted for his role as a community organizer; coordinating meetings in the wake of the Namamugi Incident in 1862. In 1867 Bailey also established a Japanese language monthly periodical, The Bankoku Shimbunshi, publishing 18 volumes over the succeeding two years.

Bailey retired on 1 April 1873 and was replaced by Acting Consular Chaplain, Revd. Edward W. Syle (17 February 1817 - 5 October 1890). Syle was born in Barnstaple, England, but after emigration to the United States as a young man was a graduate of both Kenyon College, Ohio and the Virginia Theological Seminary. The departure of Bailey also marked a significant change in the finances of Christ Church, Yokohama; the British Government withdrawing its annual consular stipend of 400 pounds per annum at the end of 1874.

== Later years ==
Returning to England in 1874, Bailey was serving as parish priest at St. Stephen's, Cold Norton, Essex at the time of his death in 1899.
