= John McKim =

19th and 20th-century American Anglican bishop and missionary

The Right Reverend John McKim
- Bishop of Tokyo
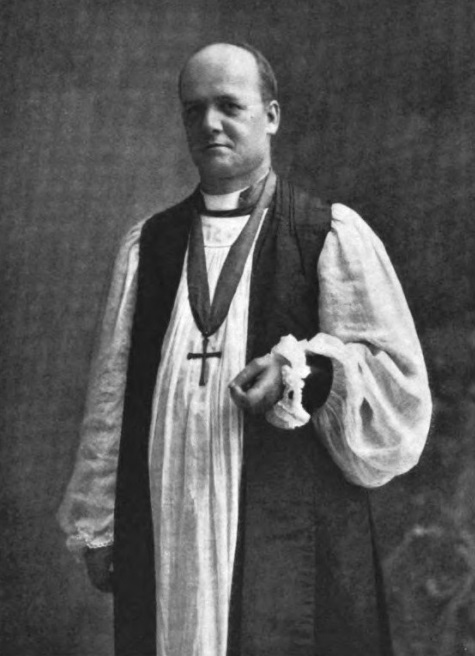
- McKim in 1913
- Church: Anglican Church in Japan

Orders
- Consecration: by Abram N. Littlejohn, Theodore B. Lyman, Thomas U.Dudley

Personal details
- Born: July 17, 1852 Pittsfield, Massachusetts
- Died: 4 April 1936 (aged 83) Honolulu, Hawaii
- Education: Griswold College; Nashotah House

John McKim (July 17, 1852 – April 4, 1936) was an American missionary who became Anglican Bishop of Tokyo (later North Tokyo) and Chancellor of Rikkyo University, which was part of the infrastructure he helped rebuild after a severe earthquake in 1923.

== Early and family life ==
Born in Pittsfield, Massachusetts on July 17, 1852 to John and Mary Ann McKim, McKim attended the local public schools. After graduating from Griswold College in Iowa (named after Bishop Alexander Viets Griswold), McKim attended Nashotah House Theological Seminary in Wisconsin. At some point, he earned a Doctor of Divinity (DD) degree. McKim later received honorary degrees from Trinity College and Oxford University, as well as the Order of the Sacred Treasure from the Japanese government.

McKim married twice. He married Ellen Augusta Cole on September 16, 1879. They had two sons, the Rev. John Cole McKim (1881-1952, who became a missionary in Japan and then retired to Peekskill, New York and became a writer) and Wilson Moran McKim (1888-195, who lived near Sterling, Illinois). After Ellen Cole McKim died in Tokyo on October 17, 1915, McKim remarried, to widow Elizabeth (Mrs. John) Baird of Quebec on May 4, 1924. He was survived by his second wife, sons and daughters Bessie and Nellie McKim (who remained in Japan on the Episcopal mission staff).

== Career ==
McKim was ordained to the diaconate and priesthood in 1879 and immediately set sail for Japan. Upon arriving in 1880, McKim began working around Osaka. He became chaplain to St. Agnes School in Kyoto.

In 1881, bishop Channing Moore Williams announced his upcoming retirement. Two years later, the General Convention announced McKim would succeed Williams. McKim returned to the United States and was consecrated Bishop of Tokyo (with jurisdiction extending from Osaka to Aomori) on June 14, 1893 at St. Thomas Church, New York City. During the same service Frederick Rogers Graves was consecrated bishop of Shanghai.

During his 42-year episcopate, McKim traveled all over Japan, including rural and mountain districts. He saw the nation develop from a feudal state into a great power. Christianity grew from a dozen native Christians (and no native-born priests) and a reputation for being political emissaries trying to break Japanese from loyalty to their Emperor, into a constructive force within the nation (including many civil servants). By 1928, the nation had 400,000 Japanese Christians and about 2000 native clergymen.

The diocese was divided four times, and had six bishops by the time McKim resigned in 1935. He oversaw the organization of the Japanese Anglican church two years before Japan adopted a constitution.

McKim became best known in missionary circles for his cable to New York after the Great Kantō earthquake of September 1, 1923: "All gone but faith in God." On December 7 and 9 of that same year, he officiated at the consecration of the first two native Bishops: Motoda and Naide. Bishop McKim then charged them to rebuild the church in the capital and established himself in the diocese of North Tokyo. Soon, he sailed to the United States for fundraising. Rebuilt church properties after the earthquake included St. Luke's Hospital and St. Paul's University.

McKim, together with Edward Bickersteth, Bishop of South Tokyo, participated in the Fourth Lambeth Conference at Canterbury in 1897.

== Death and legacy ==
McKim attempted to resign in 1934 due to ill health (and the death of his friend Rudolf Teusler, who had directed St. Luke's Hospital since 1900), but the House of Bishops urged him to remain. He managed to retire to Honolulu in November, 1935, and died at his home on April 4, 1936. A funeral was held at St. Andrew's Cathedral in Honolulu and the body returned to Nashotah House for burial.

A memorial service was also held that November in St. Thomas's Episcopal Church in New York, led by that church's rector as well as Joseph Marshall Francis of Indianapolis (Vice Chairman of the house of bishops, and who had served in Japan under McKim) and John W. Wood (executive secretary of the Department of Foreign Missions.

McKim's daughters remained in Japan working for the Episcopal mission. As World War II broke out, Bessie McKim was in Hawaii, and her sister Nellie McKim was in the Philippine Islands. Bessie McKim used her knowledge of Japanese language and culture working for the Office of War Information (and led the kindergarten department at St. Clement's Church), then returned to Japan to work at St. Luke's Hospital with her sister in 1947. Nellie McKim was interned first in Sagada in northern Luzon, and then at Camp Holmes near Baguio. Her language proficiency helped mediate between the prisoners and their guards. She remained in Manila at the request of bishop Norman S. Binsted to assist the Office of War Information, and later as his secretary.

== See also ==
- Anglican Church in Japan
