= Nippon Sei Ko Kai =

National Anglican church for Japan

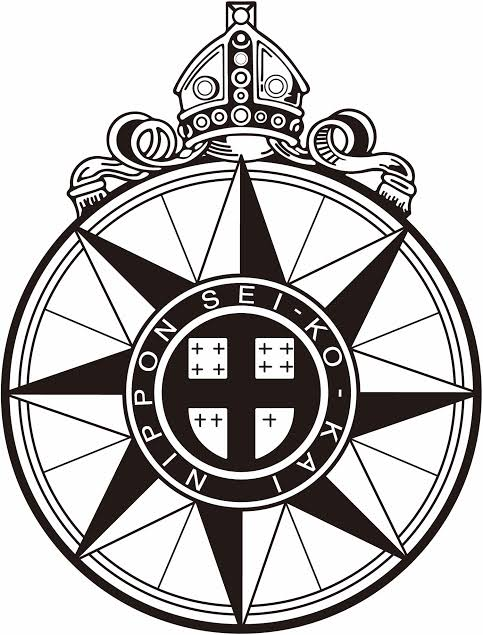
- Classification: Protestant
- Orientation: Anglican
- Scripture: Holy Bible
- Theology: Anglican doctrine
- Polity: Episcopal
- Primate: Renta Nishihara
- Headquarters: 65 Yaraicho, Shinjuku-ku, Tokyo
- Territory: Japan
- Members: 58,000
- Official website: www.nskk.org

The Nippon Sei Ko Kai (Japanese: 日本聖公会, romanized: Nippon Seikōkai, lit. 'Japanese Holy Catholic Church'), abbreviated as NSKK, sometimes referred to in English as the Anglican Episcopal Church in Japan, is the national Christian church representing the Province of Japan (日本管区, Nippon Kanku) within the Anglican Communion.

As a member of the Anglican Communion the Nippon Sei Ko Kai shares many of the historic doctrinal and liturgical practices of the Church of England, but is a fully autonomous national church governed by its own synod and led by its own primate. The Nippon Sei Ko Kai, in common with other churches in the Anglican Communion, considers itself to be a part of the One, Holy, catholic and Apostolic Church and to be both Catholic and Reformed.

With an estimated 80 million members worldwide, the Anglican Communion is the third largest Christian communion in the world, after the Catholic Church and the Eastern Orthodox Churches. The Nippon Sei Ko Kai had approximately 32,000 members organised into eleven dioceses and found in local church congregations throughout Japan. In 2017, Growth and Decline in the Anglican Communion: 1980 to the Present, published by Routledge, collected research reporting there were 58,000 Anglicans in the church in Japan.

== History ==
=== Background (1549–1846) ===
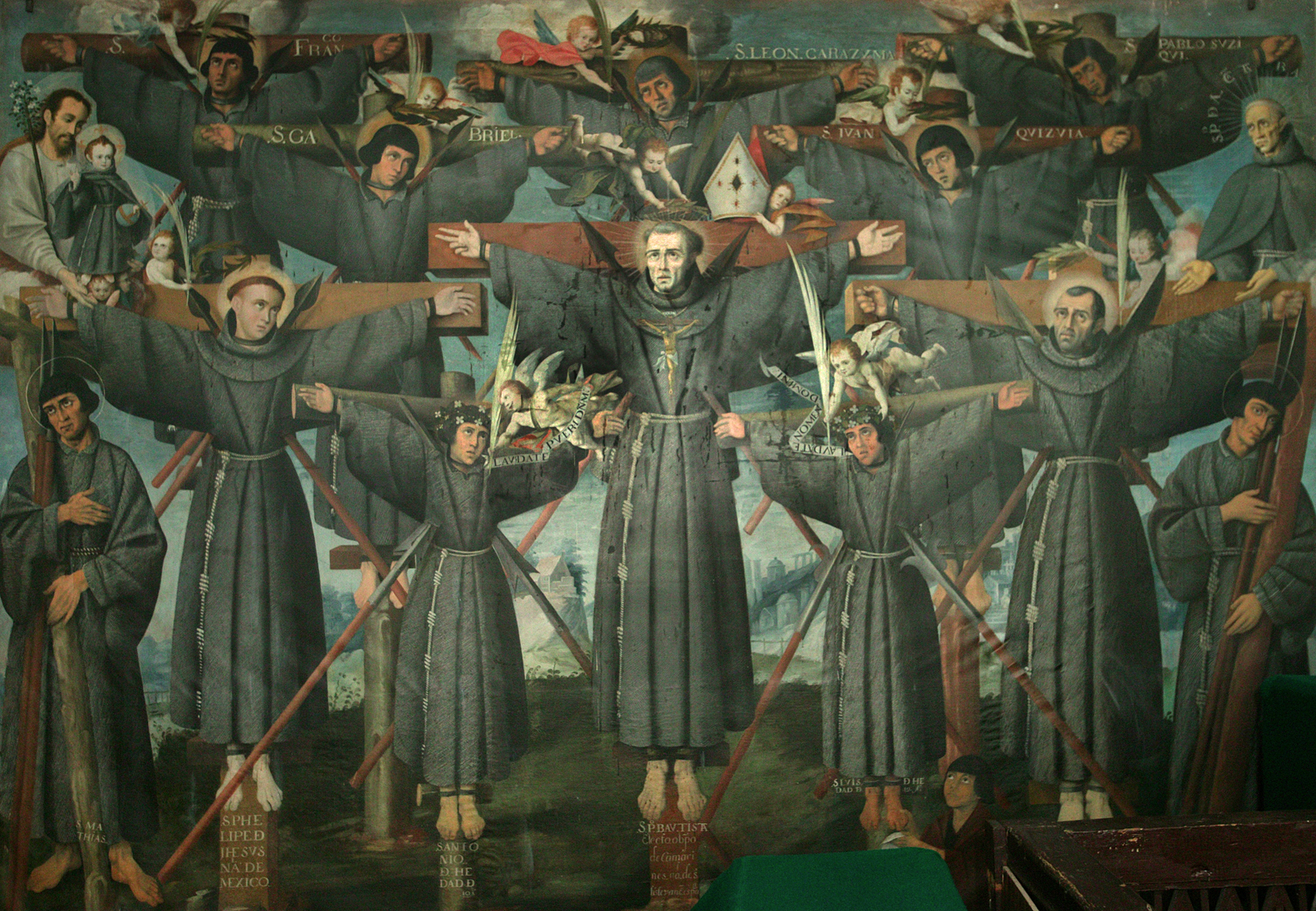
Depiction of the Nagasaki Martyrs (16th century)

Jesuit Saint Francis Xavier together with Portuguese explorers and missionaries first brought Christianity to Japan in the 16th century. In 1587, the Christian faith and life were outlawed and Christians, Japanese and foreign, were openly persecuted. In memory of these early Japanese Christians, and in common with the Catholic Church, the Nippon Sei Ko Kai commemorates the Martyrs of Japan every February 5 for their life and witness.

All foreigners were subsequently expelled in 1640 as Japan began two centuries of self-imposed isolation and Christian communities were driven into hiding. When foreigners were eventually allowed back into the main islands of Japan in the 1850s, they found thousands of Christians who had maintained their Christian faith and identity through centuries of persecution.

=== Early mission church (1846–1900) ===
Anglican church mission work in Japan started with the British Loochoo Naval Mission on the outlying Ryukyu Islands in May 1846. George Jones, a United States Navy chaplain traveling with the Expedition of Commodore Perry, led the first recorded Anglican burial service on Japanese soil at Yokohama on 9 March 1854. More permanent mission priests of the Episcopal Church, John Liggins and Channing Moore Williams, arrived in the treaty port of Nagasaki in May and June 1859. After the opening of the port of Yokohama in June 1859, Anglicans in the foreign community gathered for worship services in the British consul's residence. A British consular chaplain, Michael Buckworth Bailey, arrived in August 1862 and after a successful fundraising campaign Christ Church, Yokohama, was dedicated on 18 October 1863.

Due to government restrictions on the teaching of Christianity and a significant language barrier, the religious duties of clergy were initially limited to serving as ministers to the American and British residents of the foreign settlements. The first recorded baptism by Williams of a Japanese convert, a Kumamoto samurai named Shōmura Sukeuemon, was not until 1867.

Liggins and Williams were followed to Nagasaki in January 1869 by George Ensor, a priest representing the Church Mission Society of the Church of England. Following 1874, he was joined by H. Burnside at Nagasaki, C. F. Warren at Osaka, Philip Fyson at Yokohama, J. Piper at Tokyo (Yedo), H. Evington at Niigata and W. Dening at Hokkaido. H. Maundrell joined the Japan mission in 1875 and served at Nagasaki. John Batchelor was a missionary priest to the Ainu people of Hokkaido from 1877 to 1941.

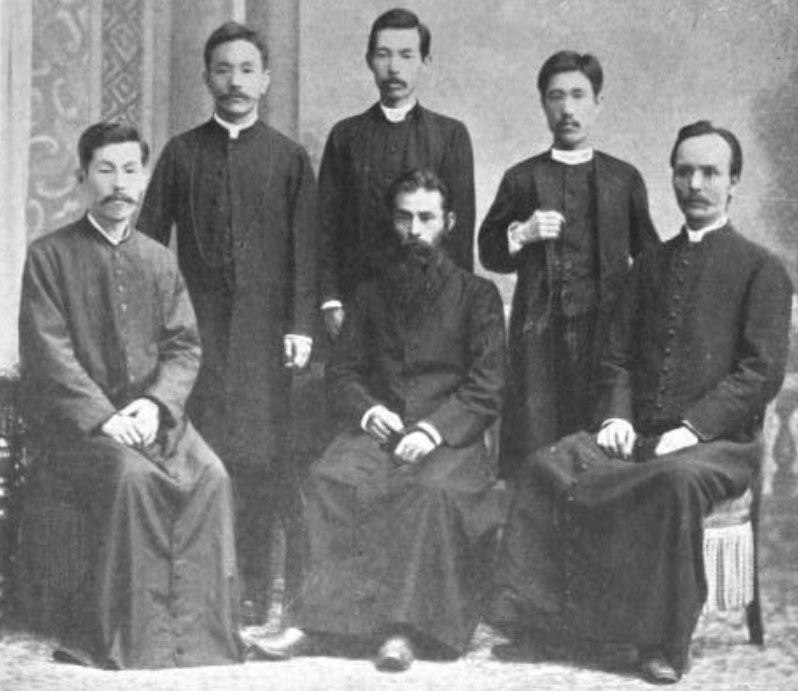
Nippon Sei Ko Kai Clergy (c. 1888)

After the Meiji Restoration, significant new legislation relating to the freedom of religion was introduced, facilitating in September 1873, the arrival in Tokyo of Alexander Croft Shaw and William Ball Wright as the first missionary priests sent to Japan by the Society for Propagation of the Gospel. Williams, appointed Episcopal Bishop of China and Japan in 1867, moved first to reside in Osaka in 1869, then subsequently relocated to Tokyo in December 1873.

By 1879, through cooperative work between the various Anglican missions, the largest part of the Book of Common Prayer had been translated and published in Japanese. A full version of the text being completed by 1882. On Palm Sunday 1883, Nobori Kanai and Masakazu Tai, graduates of the Tokyo theological school were ordained by Bishop Williams as the first Japanese deacons in the church. In 1888, the Anglican Church of Canada also began missionary work in Japan, later mainly focusing on Nagoya and Central Japan.

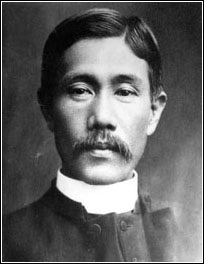
John Toshimichi Imai

In addition to the work of ordained church ministers, much of the positive public profile enjoyed by Anglican Church in Japan during this early mission period was due to the work of lay missionaries working to establish schools, universities and medical facilities. Significant among this group were missionary women such as Ellen G. Eddy at St. Agnes' School in Osaka, Alice Hoar at St. Hilda's School and Florence Pitman at St. Margaret's School, both located in Tokyo. Hannah Riddell who established the Kaishun Hospital for people with leprosy in Kumamoto and Mary Cornwall-Legh who ran a similar facility in Kusatsu, Gunma, were both honored by the Japanese Government for their work.

The first synod of the Nippon Sei Ko Kai met in Osaka in February 1887. At this meeting, instigated by Bishop Edward Bickersteth and presided over by Bishop Williams, it was agreed to unite the various Anglican missionary efforts in Japan into one autonomous national church; the Nippon Sei Ko Kai. The 17 European and American participants at the first Synod were outnumbered by 14 other clergy and 50 Japanese lay delegates.

Total Nippon Sei Ko Kai church membership in 1887 was estimated to be 1,300. John Toshimichi Imai, ordained deacon in 1888 and raised to the priesthood by Bishop Bickersteth in 1889, was the first Japanese person to become an ordained Anglican priest.

In 1890, J. G. Waller, a Canadian Anglican priest, arrived in Japan with his wife Lydia. 1892, they moved to Nagano where he established churches in Nagano City in 1898, which was nationally registered as an important tangible cultural property in 2006. Waller helped establish a tuberculosis sanatorium in Obuse, Nagano, funded by donations from Anglicans in Canada.

=== Continued growth and wartime challenges (1900–1945) ===
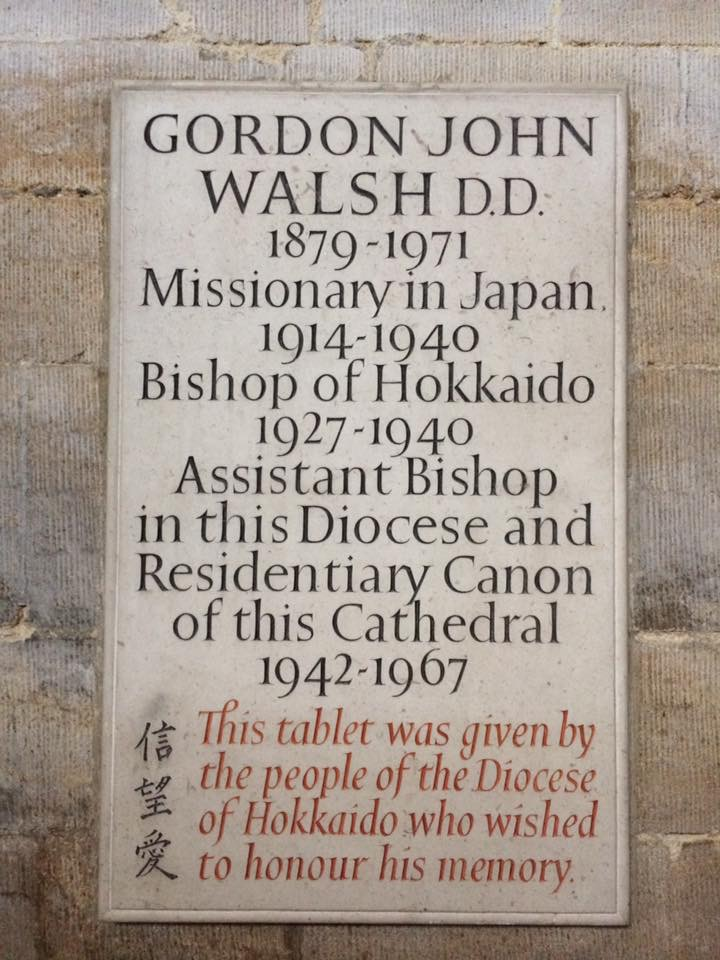
Plaque in Ely cathedral commemorating Gordon John Walsh, Bishop of Hokkaido

By 1906 the Nippon Sei Ko Kai was reported to have grown to 13,000 members, of whom 6,880 were communicants with a Japanese led ordained ministry of 42 priests and 22 deacons. Henry St. George Tucker, President of St. Paul's College and in 1913 appointed Bishop of Kyoto, was one of the foremost missionary leaders of the period who advocated that an independent, Japanese-led and self-supporting church was the only way in which Christianity could be carried to the wider population of Japan. Initiatives were put in place to help grow the financial self-sufficiency of church congregations and the first Japanese bishops, John Yasutaro Naide, Bishop of Osaka and Joseph Sakunoshin Motoda, Bishop of Tokyo, were consecrated in 1923.

During the 1930s, as overseas funding and the number of foreign Anglican missionaries in Japan declined, new challenges arose for Nippon Sei Ko Kai church leadership and laity from the increasing focus on Shinto as a state prescribed religion and the growing influence of militarism in domestic and foreign policy. Christianity was portrayed by many nationalist politicians at the time as incompatible with the loyalty of Japanese subjects. In response the Nippon Sei Ko Kai issued periodic statements in support of the Imperial Army. And the first half of the 20th century saw NSKK's overseas expansion. Taiwan Sheng Kung Hui was established, several Japanese-language churches, such as Dalian Sheng Kung Hui Church, were built in Chung Hua Sheng Kung Hui's Northern China Diocese in Manchuria, and the Anglican Church of Korea was absorbed by the NSKK.

A more active period of government persecution began in 1937, particularly for Christian denominations such as the Salvation Army with its commitment to social reform, and for the NSKK with its historic links to the Church of England. Archbishop Lang's condemnation in October of Imperial Japanese Army actions in China, provoked hostile scrutiny of the NSKK and caused some in the church leadership to publicly disassociate themselves from links with the wider Anglican Communion.

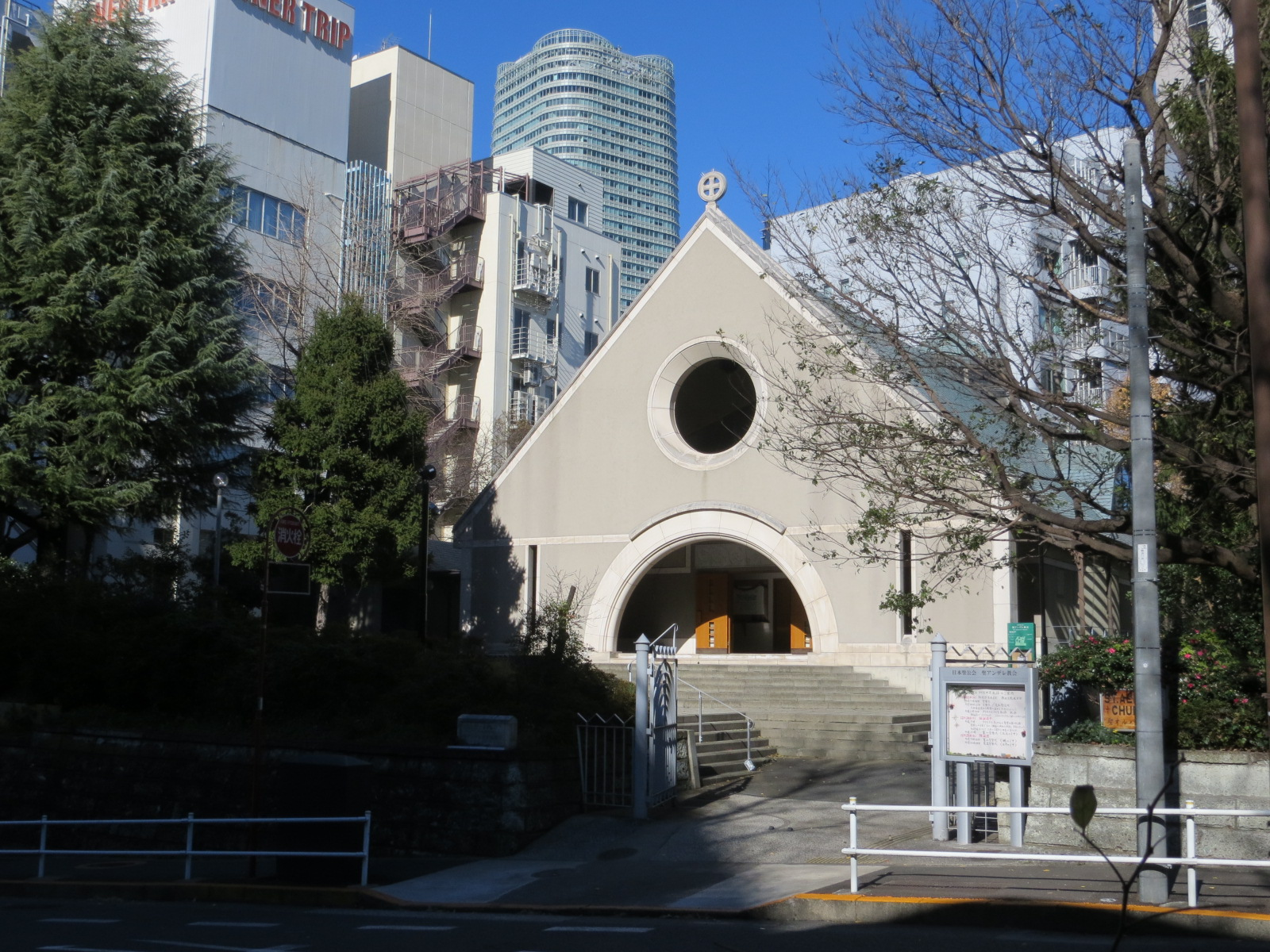
St. Andrew's Cathedral, Diocese of Tokyo

During World War II, the majority of Protestant churches in Japan were forcibly brought together by the Japanese wartime government to form the United Church of Christ in Japan, or Kyodan. Reflecting the distinctive doctrinal character of the Anglican Communion, many individual Nippon Sei Ko Kai congregations refused to join. The cost of resistance to and non-cooperation with the government's religious policies was harassment by the military police and periods of imprisonment for church leaders such as Bishops Samuel Heaslett, Hinsuke Yashiro and Todomu Sugai, as well as Primate Paul Shinji Sasaki.

St. Andrew's Tokyo, now the Cathedral church for the Diocese of Tokyo, was one such congregation that resisted government pressure, struggling to retain its land, church buildings and Anglican identity to the war's end in 1945. However, like many urban Nippon Sei Ko Kai churches, medical and educational facilities, St. Andrew's buildings were lost in the 1945 Allied incendiary bombing.

=== Post-war period (1945–) ===
The pressure of an extended war caused damage to both internal church unity and the physical infrastructure of the Nippon Sei Ko Kai. Seventy-one out of a total of 246 churches had been destroyed. Others were in bad repair due to neglect, requisition by the military, or vandalism.

Through individual and larger communal acts of reconciliation, and with the support of an Anglican Commission sent out by the Church of England's Archbishop of Canterbury, Geoffrey Fisher in 1946, the Nippon Sei Ko Kai was organizationally reordered in 1947, with a leadership consisting of Japanese bishops at the head of each diocese.

Attending the 1948 Lambeth Conference, Presiding Bishop Yashiro took with him a finely embroidered silk cope and mitre and presented it to Archbishop Fisher as a gesture of thanks from members of the Nippon Sei Ko Kai for the bonds of fellowship that continued to hold members of the Anglican Communion together in the aftermath of wartime hostilities. The Archbishop of Canterbury, Geoffrey Fisher, wore the cope at the opening service of the Lambeth Conference that year and again in 1953 at the Coronation of Queen Elizabeth II.

The Nippon Sei Ko Kai became a financially self-supporting Province of the Anglican Communion in 1972.

Adopting a formal Statement of War Responsibility at the General Synod in 1996, and reflecting on the Japanese occupation of China and Korea prior to the Second World War, the NSKK has been active in multi-year projects promoting peace, reconciliation, and youth exchange programs between East Asian nations.

Two decades after becoming the first woman deacon, Margaret Ryoko Shibukawa was ordained the first woman priest in the Nippon Sei Ko Kai in December 1998.

The Nippon Sei Ko Kai celebrated the 150th anniversary of continuous Anglican Christian witness in Japan in 2009. The occasion was marked with a series of church and community events and visits by both the then-Archbishop of Canterbury, Rowan Williams, and the Presiding Bishop of the Episcopal Church in the United States of America at the time, Katharine Jefferts Schori.

In 2013 the NSKK co-hosted with the Anglican Church of Korea the 2nd Worldwide Anglican Peace Conference in Okinawa.

The NSKK is a member of the National Christian Council in Japan.

Nathaniel Makoto Uematsu, Bishop of Hokkaido was the primate of the Anglican Church in Japan from 23 May 2006 until November 2020.

== Present ==
Luke Kenichi Muto, Bishop of Kyushu, was installed as the Primate of Nippon Sei Ko Kai on 5 November 2020. He was succeeded in 2024 by Bishop David Eisho Uehara of Okinawa.

Today the Nippon Sei Ko Kai continues its traditions of ministry and Christian witness in Japan through church congregational life, hospitals, schools, social advocacy, and support for non-profit organizations.

The church, at both a national and local level, works to support disadvantaged, marginalized, or discriminated against communities in Japan, as well as communities in Tohoku impacted by the 2011 Great East Japan earthquake, tsunami and subsequent crisis at the Fukushima Daiichi nuclear generating plant.

The NSKK also engages in field-based mission work overseas, such as in the Philippines.

Eight of the NSKK's dioceses ordain women to the diaconate and priesthood. The NSKK has ordained women to the priesthood since 1998. Women have been ordained to the diaconate since 1978, and the first woman to be ordained a deacon and, later, as a priest was Margaret Shibukawa Ryoko. In 2021, the Diocese of Hokkaido elected Grace Trazu Sasamori as bishop, making her the first woman to be elected bishop in the church.

=== Worship ===
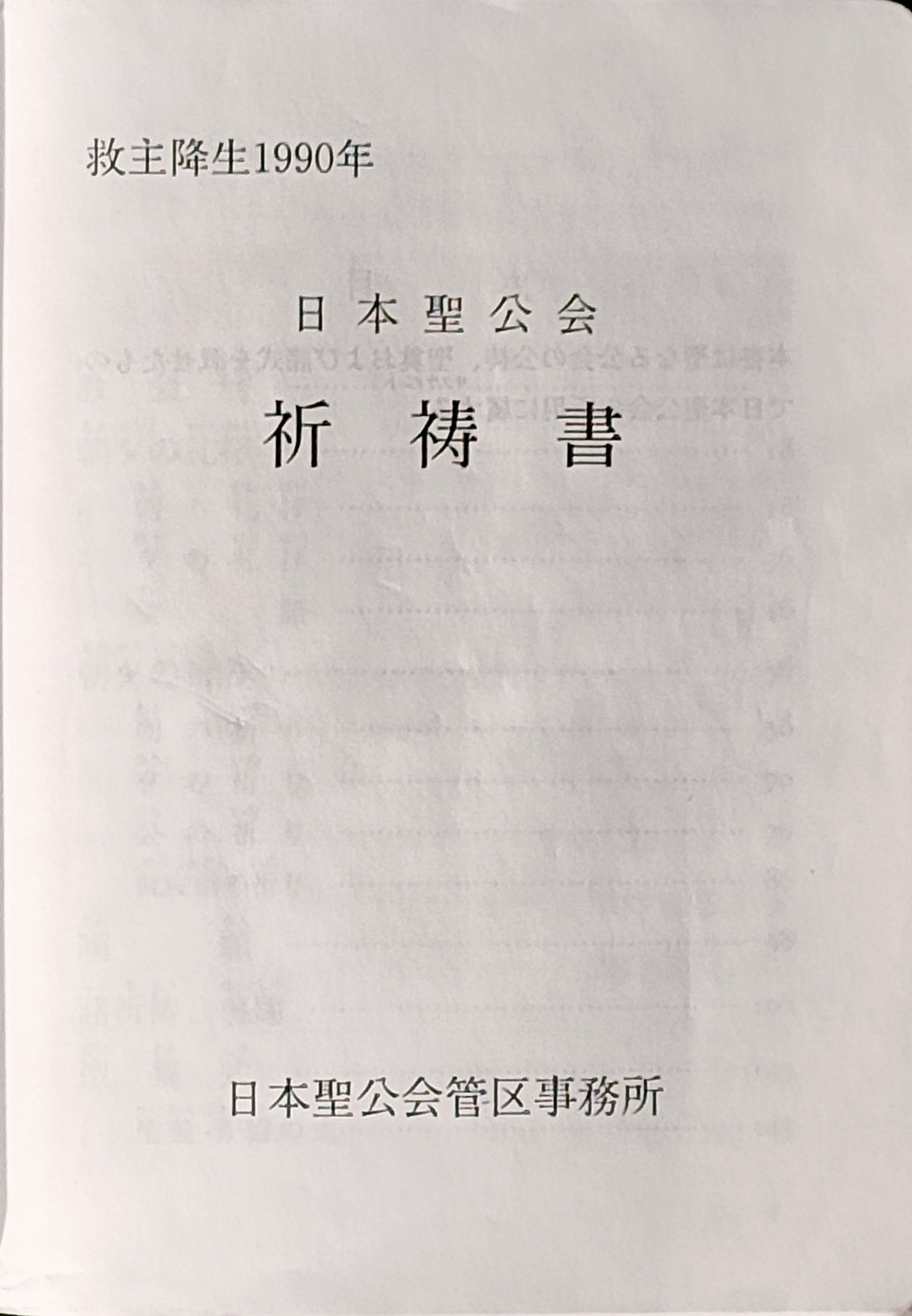
The inner cover of Ki Tō Sho, the Japanese Book of Common Prayer (1990)

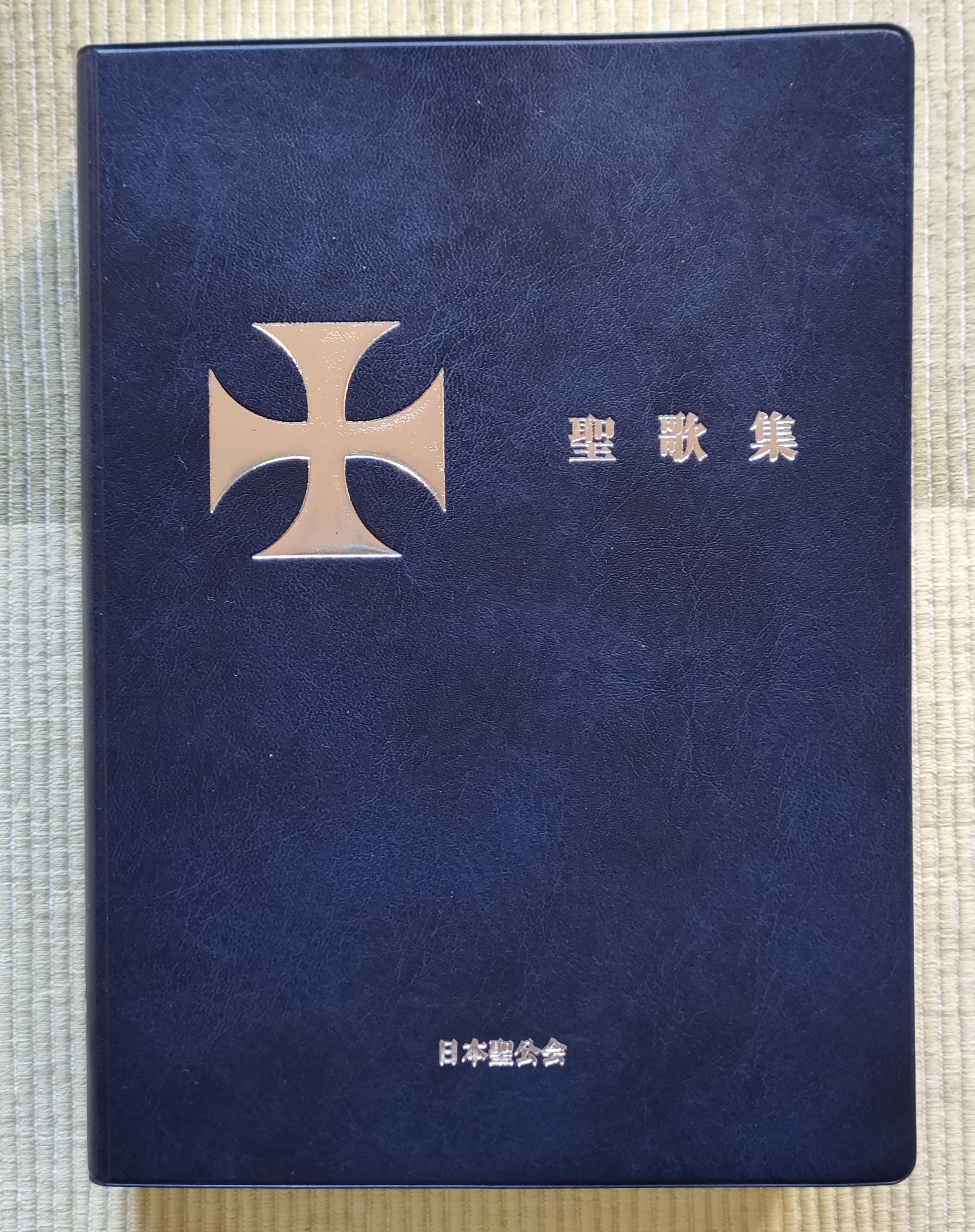
The cover of Sei Ka Shū, the NSKK Hymnal (2006)

The Book of Common Prayer used in worship is the Ki Tō Sho (日本聖公会祈祷書, 1959) that includes in its latest 2000 revision the Lord's Prayer wording, common between the Nippon Sei Ko Kai (NSKK) and the Catholic Church in Japan.

The Bible reading at the church is now mostly from the Japan Bible Society Interconfessional Version (2018), replacing the Japanese New Interconfessional Translation Bible (1987).

The Japanese Hymns Ancient and Modern has been replaced by Sei Ka Shū, the NSKK Hymnal (日本聖公会聖歌集, 2006).

== Dioceses and notable churches ==
There are currently eleven dioceses in the Nippon Sei Ko Kai and over three hundred church and chapel congregations spread across the country. Notable churches in each diocese from north to south include:

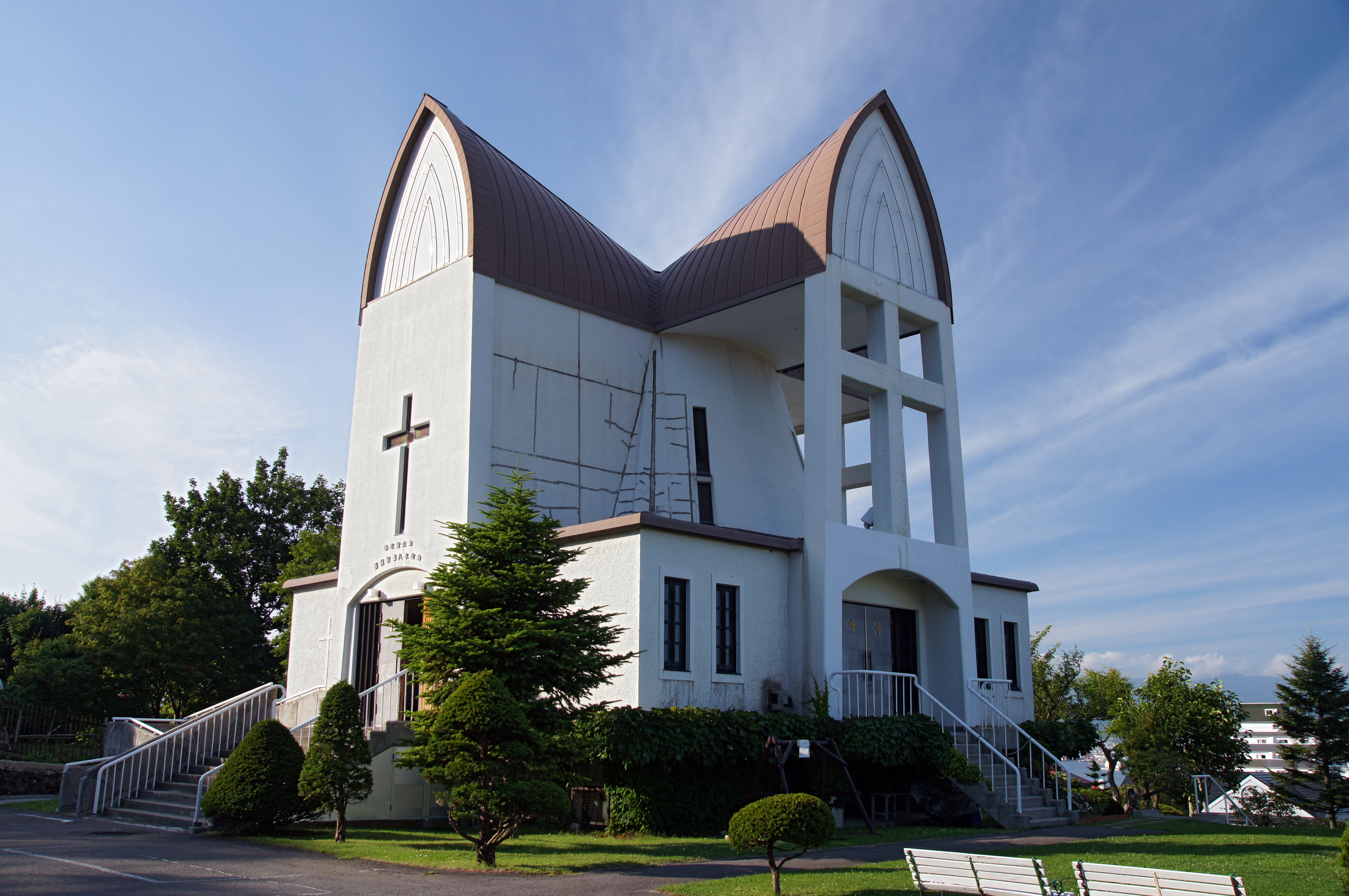
St. John's Church, Hakodate

St. Matthias' Church Cathedral, Maebashi

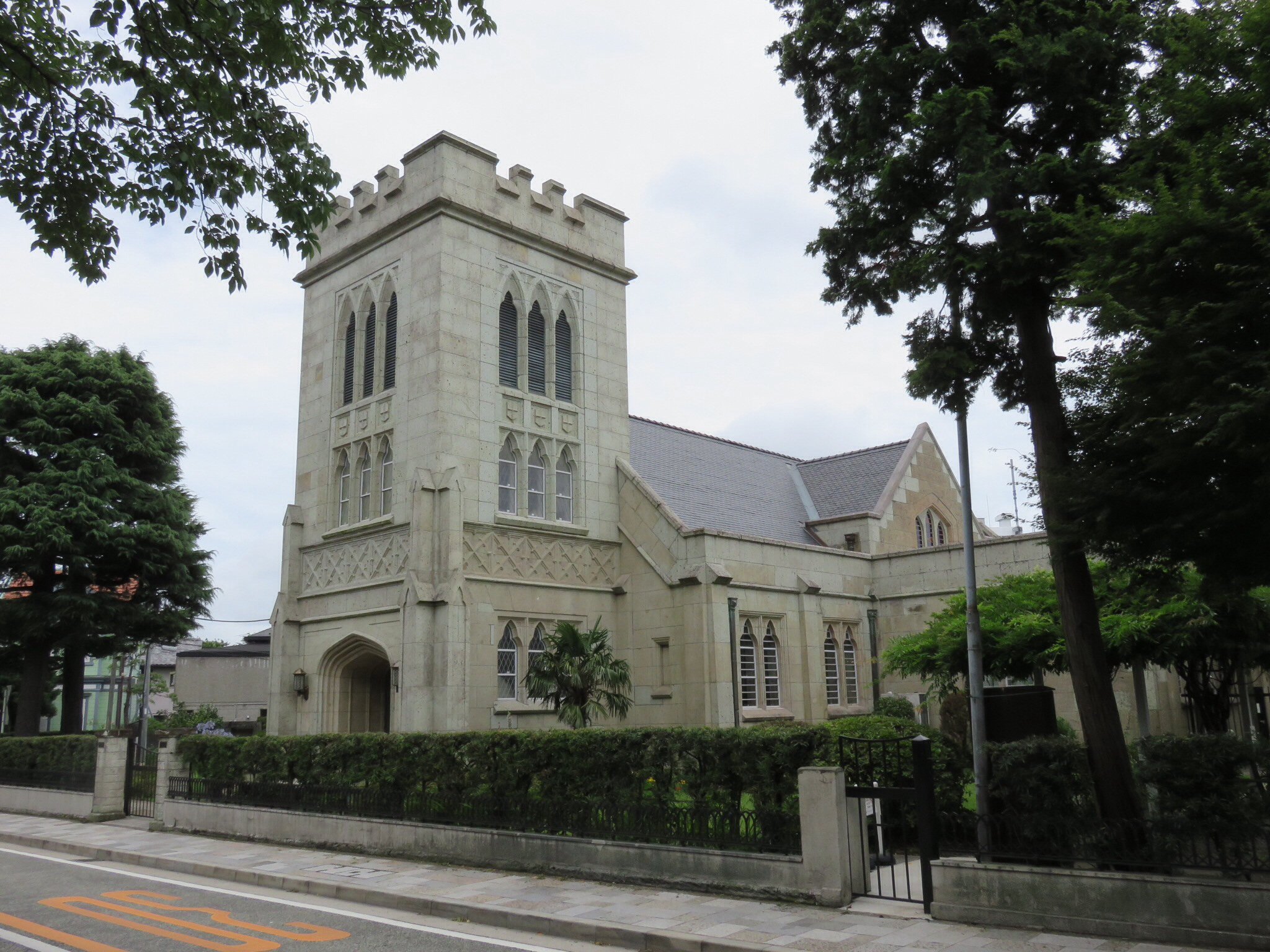
Christ Church, Yokohama

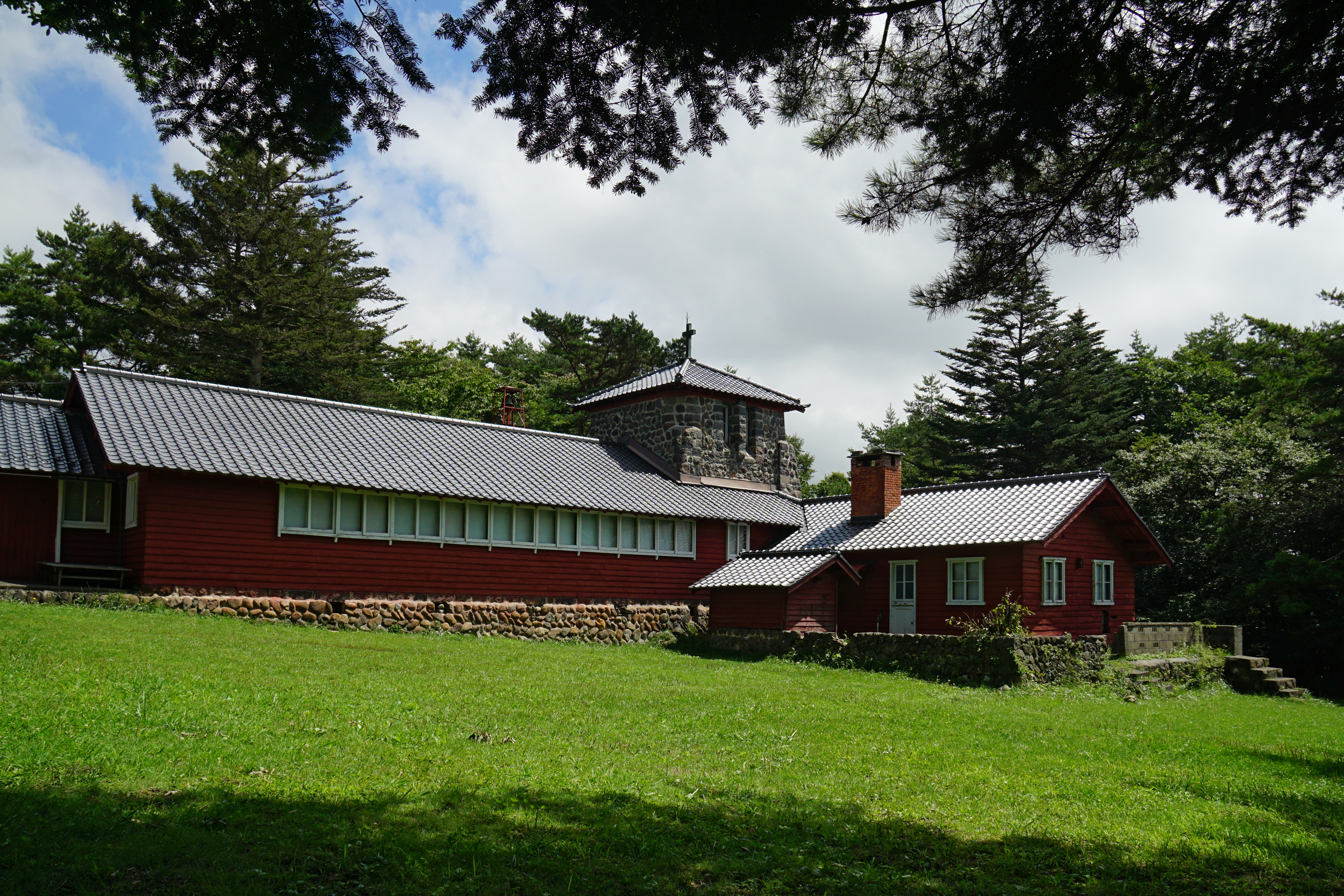
St. Andrew's Church, Kiyosato, Yamanashi

=== Hokkaido ===
The Anglican mission to Hokkaido was pioneered since 1874 by the Rev. Walter Dening and the Rev. John Batchelor, who contributed to the welfare and education of the Ainu people. More than 130 years since then, the Anglicans in the Diocese of Hokkaido, with its diocesan cathedral at Christ Church Cathedral, Sapporo, have made unique contributions in various fields, establishing 24 churches, 5 kindergartens and 4 nursery schools.

The bishop is Maria Grace Tazu Sasamori (笹森田鶴) since 2022, NSKK's first female bishop.

=== Tohoku ===
The first Anglican-Episcopal mission to the Tohoku Region, i.e. Northeast Japan, of Aomori, Akita, Iwate, Miyagi, Yamagata and Fukushima Prefectures started in 1891 when the missionary team was sent to Fukushima by Bishop John McKim of the Diocese of North Tokyo (now the Diocese of Kitakanto). In 1894, the Rev. H.J. Jefferies was sent to Sendai, the largest city of the Region, his missionary activities including the church meetings, sewing schools, kindergartens, and Sunday schools. The church building in Sendai was completed in 1905, at which time Bishop N. S. Binstead of the Episcopal Church USA arrived as the bishop of the Diocese of Tohoku.

Just before and during Pacific War, foreign missionaries were forced to leave and the NSKK was dissolved. However, it rose from the difficult war-time and postwar period, and developed into a self-sufficient diocese. The building of the Christ Church in Sendai was burned down in the 1945 Bombing of Sendai, was rebuilt in 1965, and was rebuilt again in 2014.

=== Kitakanto ===
The first Anglican-Episcopal mission in the Diocese of North Tokyo (now the Diocese of Kitakanto, with St. Mattias' Cathedral in Maebashi, covering NSKK churches in Ibaraki, Tochigi, Gunma, and Saitama Prefectures) was to Kawagoe in 1878. From Kawagoe, the mission spread to other cities. In 1893, the first bishop of the diocese, John McKim, was installed.

In 1901, the first kindergaten in Saitama Prefecture opened as the NSKK church-affiliated kindergarten in Kawagoe. In 1916, Conwall Legh started the medical care unit of leprosy patients in Kusatsu, Gunma. The facility of the Society of St John the Evangelist was transferred to the diocese and used as the Koyama House of Prayer since 2004.

The current Bishop of the Diocese of Kitakanto is Francis Xavier Hiroyuki Takahashi (髙橋宏幸) interim bishop (管理主教).

=== Tokyo ===
The Diocese of Tokyo was established in its modern form in May 1923. There are 33 churches and 9 chapels in the Diocese, many having been first established in the second half of the nineteenth century.

- St. Andrew's Cathedral, Minato-ku, Tokyo
- St. Alban's, Minato-ku, Tokyo, an English language based NSKK congregation located adjacent to St. Andrew's Cathedral.
- St. Luke's Chapel, Chuo-ku, Tokyo, located in the Old Building of St. Luke's International Hospital. One of the very few NSKK church buildings in central Tokyo to have survived the Second World War

=== Yokohama ===
- St. Andrew's Cathedral, Yokohama
- Christ Church, Yokohama landmark church located in Yamate overlooking the Port of Yokohama, hosting both English and Japanese language based congregations.
- St. Andrew's Church, Kiyosato, Yamanashi

=== Chubu ===
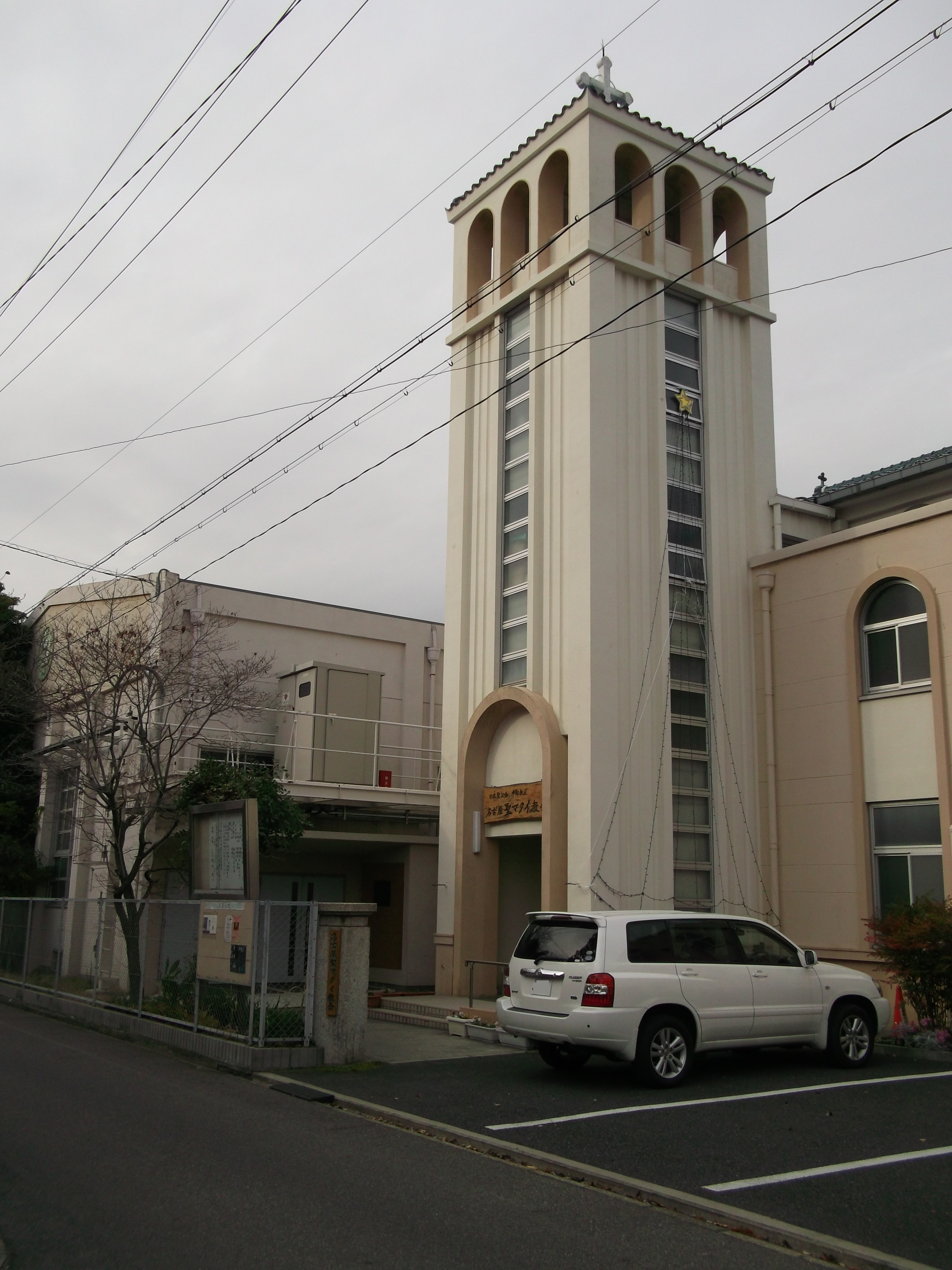
St. Matthew's Cathedral in Nagoya, Japan

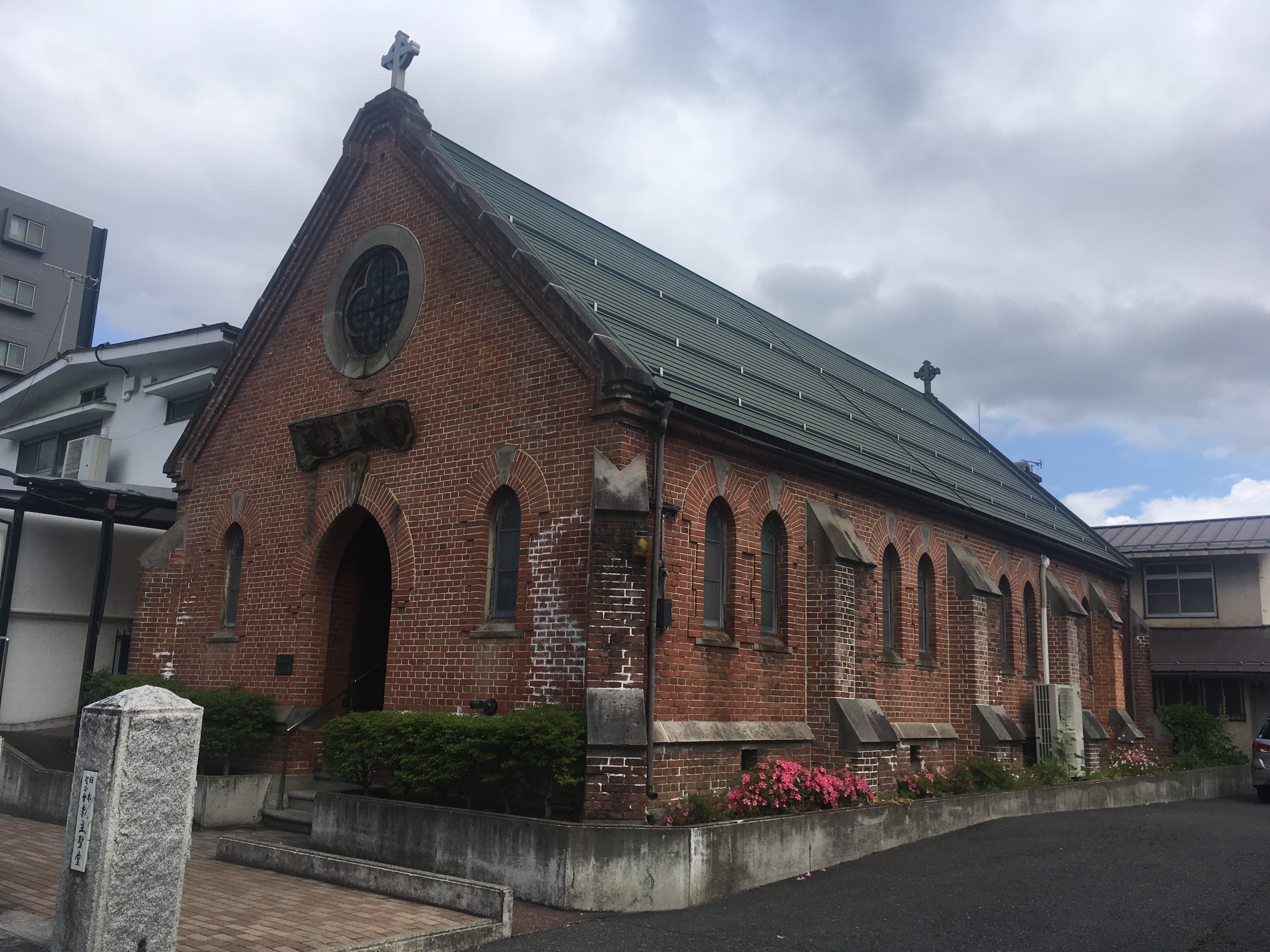
Nagano Holy Saviour Church, Nagano

The Diocese of Chubu, with its diocesan cathedral at St. Matthew's Church Cathedral, Nagoya, covers the parishes and other facilities in the four prefectures of the Chubu Region (meaning "Central Japan"): Aichi, Gifu, Nagano, and Niigata. For historical reasons, the parishes in Fukui, Ishikawa and Toyama Prefectures of Japan's Chubu Region belong to the Diocese of Kyoto, and those in Yamanashi and Shizuoka Prefectures, to the Diocese of Yokohama.

The diocese of Chubu was established with the help of Anglican Church of Canada. The Nagano Holy Saviour Church, Nagano, nationally Registered Important Tangible Cultural Property from 2006, was built by J. G. Waller, a Canadian missionary. The origin of St. Mary's College, Nagoya goes back to the Child care workers' school established by Margaret Young (1855–1940), another missionary from Anglican Church of Canada.

The bishop of the diocese is the Rt. Rev'd Dr. Renta Nishihara (西原廉太), ordained in October 2020 as the tenth bishop. In 2026, he was elected as installed as the church's primate.

=== Kyoto ===
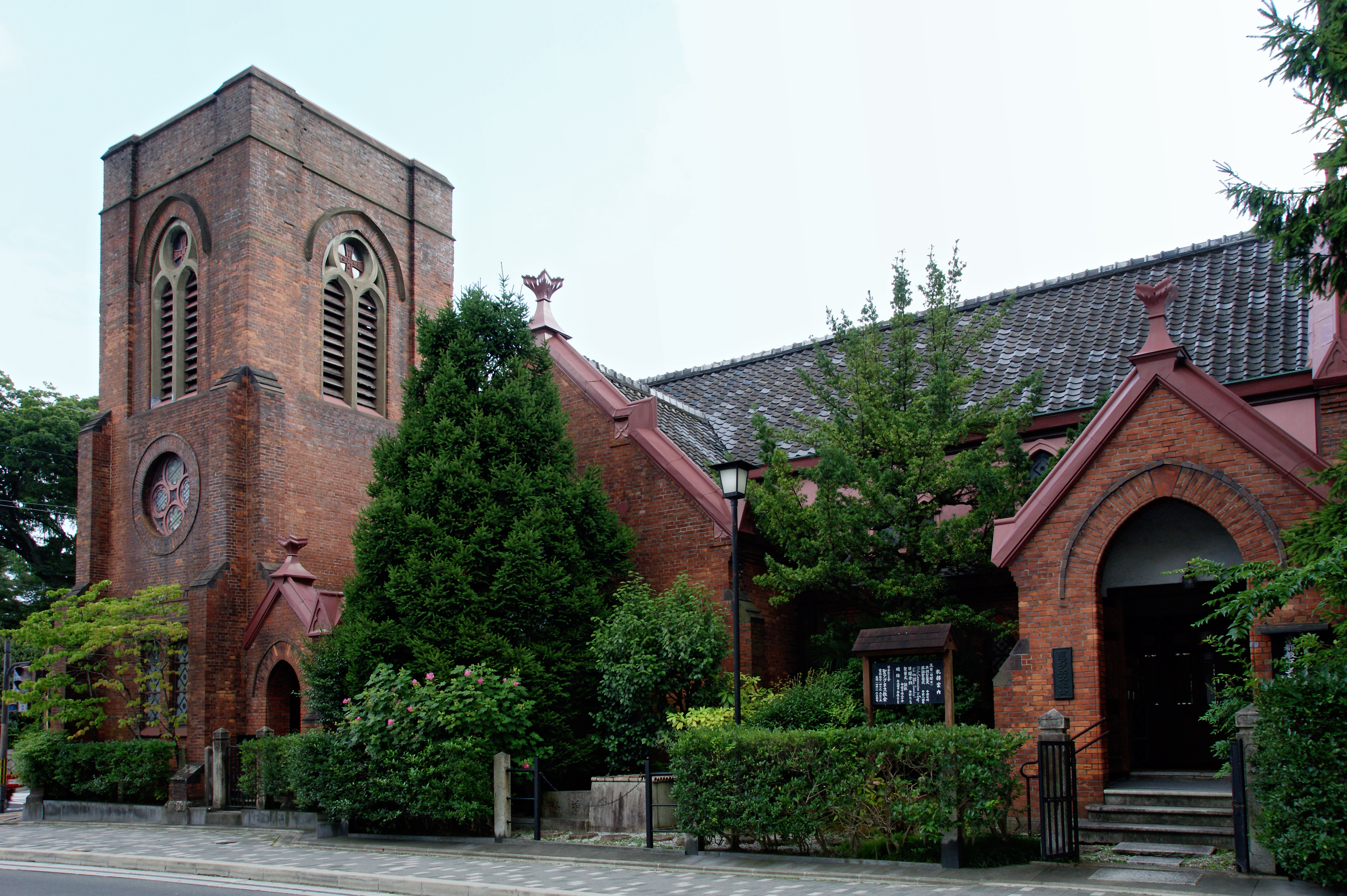
St Agnes Cathedral, Kyoto

- St. Agnes' Cathedral, Kyoto

=== Osaka ===
- Christ Church Cathedral, Kawaguchi, Osaka the cathedral seat of the Bishop of Osaka.

=== Kobe ===
- St. Michael's Cathedral, Kobe

=== Kyushu ===
- St. Paul's Cathedral, Fukuoka

=== Okinawa ===
- Cathedral of St. Paul and St. Peter, Mihara, Naha, Okinawa

== Related facilities ==
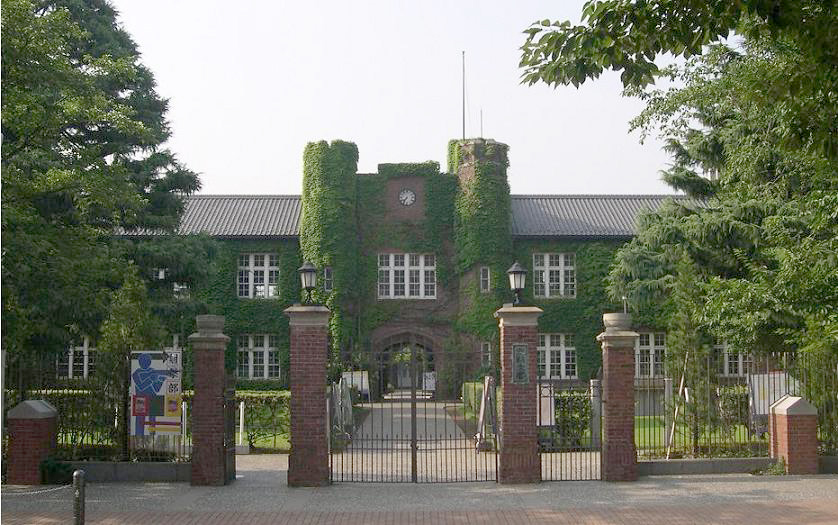
Rikkyo University, Tokyo

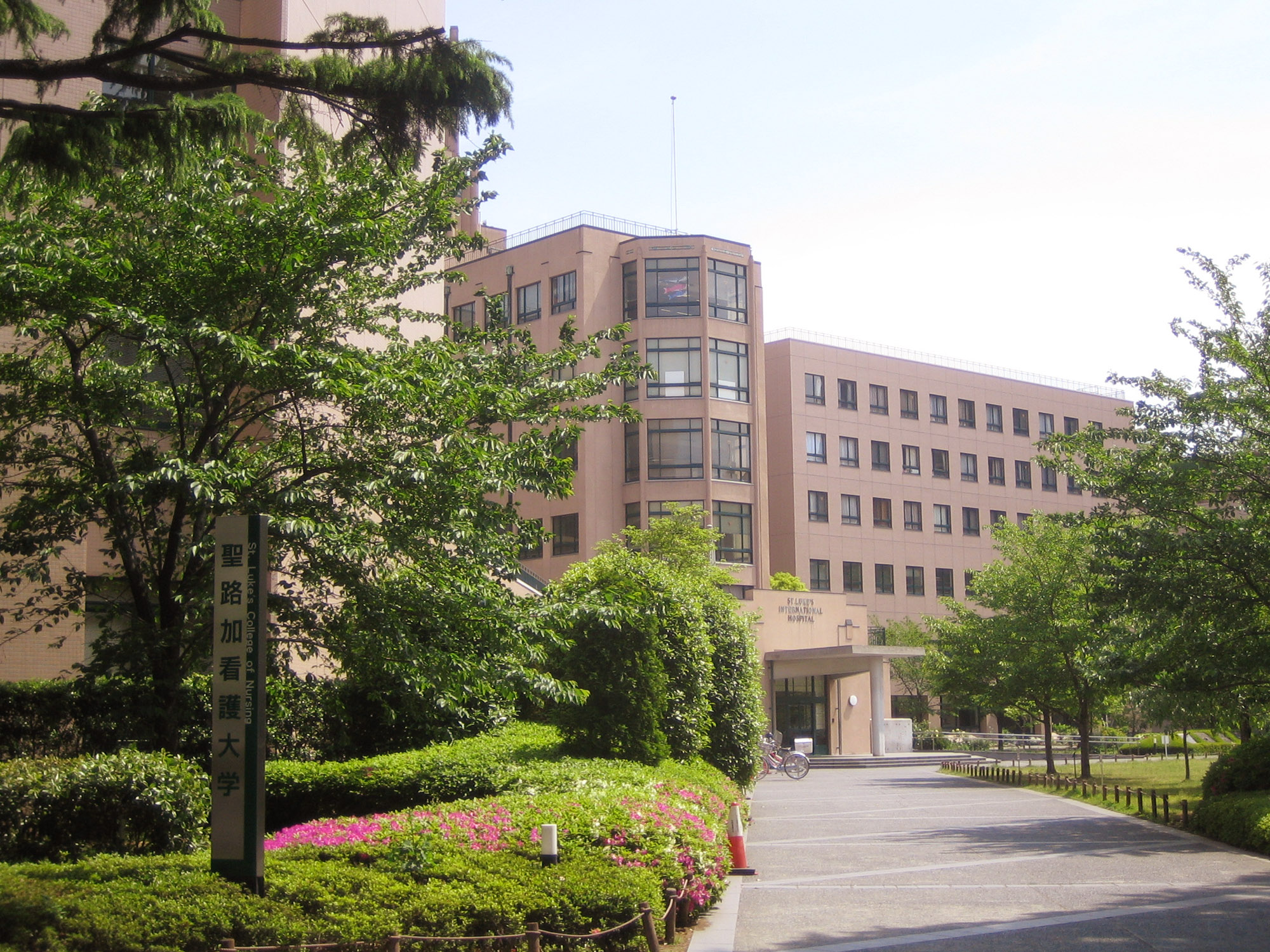
St. Luke's International Hospital, Tokyo

Nippon Sei Ko Kai affiliated educational, medical and social welfare institutions in Japan number over two hundred. Comprehensive lists of affiliated institutions are available on the official NSKK website.

=== Seminaries ===
- Central Theological College, Tokyo Founded in 1908 from the amalgamation of three older Japanese Anglican seminaries.
- Williams Theological Seminary, Kyoto

=== Religious orders ===
- Community of Nazareth, Tokyo. An Anglican religious order first established in 1936 under the guidance of the English Community of the Epiphany.

=== Universities and colleges ===
- Rikkyo University, Tokyo (立教大学 Rikkyō Daigaku), also known as St. Paul's University
- St. Margaret's Junior College, Tokyo (立教女学院短期大学 Rikkyō Jogakuin Tanki Daigaku)
- St. Mary's College, Nagoya
- Momoyama Gakuin University, Osaka (桃山学院大学 Momoyama Gakuin Daigaku), also known as Saint Andrew's University.
- Heian Jogakuin University, Kyoto and Osaka, also known as St. Agnes University
- Poole Gakuin University, Osaka
- Poole Gakuin Junior College, Osaka
- Kobe International University, Kobe
- Kobe Shoin Women's University, Kobe

=== Hospitals ===
- St. Luke's International Hospital, Tokyo
- St. Barnabas' Hospital, Osaka

== Notable people ==
=== Early mission church (1859–1900) ===
- Channing Moore Williams (1829–1910), Episcopal Bishop of China and Japan, founder of Rikkyo University
- John Liggins (1829–1912), first missionary and ordained representative of the Anglican Communion in Japan
- Alexander Croft Shaw (1846–1902), missionary, founder of St. Andrew's Church in Tokyo and Archdeacon of North Japan
- Edward Bickersteth (1850–1897), First Bishop of South Tokyo
- John Batchelor (1854–1944), missionary to the Ainu communities of Hokkaido
- John McKim (1852–1936), Bishop of North Tokyo
- William Awdry (1842–1910), Second Bishop of South Tokyo
- Arthur Lloyd (1852–1911), missionary, academic and translator
- Philip Fyson (1846–1928), Bishop of Hokkaido. Member of the Church Missionary Society
- John Toshimichi Imai (1863–1919), First Japanese born Anglican priest, ordained in 1889

=== Continued growth and wartime challenges (1900–1945) ===
- Paul Shinji Sasaki, (1885–1946) Bishop of Mid-Japan, later Bishop of Tokyo and Presiding Bishop of the Nippon Seikokai
- Todomu Sugai, (1883–1947) Bishop of South Tokyo and Presiding Bishop January 1947 to August 1947
- Henry St. George Tucker, (1874–1956) Bishop of Kyoto, later Presiding Bishop of the Episcopal Church
- Joseph Sakunoshin Motoda, (1862–1928) Bishop of Tokyo
- John Yasutaro Naide, (1866–1945) Bishop of Osaka
- Peter Yonetaro Matsui, Bishop of Tokyo
- Rudolf Teusler, (1876–1934) Medical lay missionary, founder of St. Luke's International Hospital, Tokyo
- Mary Cornwall Legh, (1857–1941) Missionary to the leprosy communities of Kusatsu, Gunma.
- Samuel Heaslett, (1875–1947) Fourth Bishop of South Tokyo
- Walter Weston, (1860–1940) Missionary and Japan Alpine Mountaineer
- Sidney Catlin Partridge, First Bishop of Kyoto
- Hiromichi Kato, Bishop of Tohoku
- Norman S. Binsted, First Bishop of Tohoku elected 1928
- Arthur Lea, Bishop of Kyushu or South Japan
- Philip Kemball Fyson, Bishop of Hokkaido
- Charles S. Reifsnider, (1875–1958), Suffragan Bishop of North Kanto, President of Rikkyo University
- Kenneth Abbott Viall, Assistant Bishop of Tokyo
- Michael Hinsuke Yashiro, Bishop of Kobe, elected Presiding Bishop in 1947
- Paul Rusch, (1897–1979) Lay missionary, educator, founder of Seisen Ryo (KEEP), Yamanashi Prefecture
- Masayoshi Ōhira, (1910–1980) Prime Minister of Japan from 1978 to 1980
- Light Maekawa, Bishop of Hokkaido

== Relevant literature ==
- Tucker, Henry St. George. The History of the Episcopal Church in Japan. New York: Charles Scribners' Sons, 1938.
