= Japanese in Texas =

Japanese culture and people in Texas

Japanese Texans are Japanese Americans living in Texas.

== History ==
In 1902, the Houston Chamber of Commerce requested help from Japanese Consul General Sadatsuchi Uchida in improving Texas rice production techniques. At least thirty attempts were made by Japanese to grow rice in the state at this time, with two of the most successful colonies being one founded by Seito Saibara in 1903 in Webster, and another by Kichimatsu Kishi in 1907 east of Beaumont. Within three years of Seito's farm being established, area rice harvest nearly doubled. By 1910, the Japanese population was around 300.

A second wave of Japanese began arriving in 1920, some moving from California to avoid discrimination there. Although conditions were better than some other states, Japanese families attempting to move to Texas were turned away by a hostile mob in 1921, and the Texas legislature, following the precedent set by the California Alien Land Law of 1913, passed its own law restricting Japanese ownership of land. The Immigration Act of 1924 severely limited Japanese immigration to the country, and most Japanese moving to the state during this period were second or third-generation members of the Japanese diaspora.

In 1940, there were around 500 Japanese living in Texas. In response to anti-Japanese discrimination following the bombing of Pearl Harbor, the Jingu family which maintained the Japanese Tea Garden in San Antonio were evicted and the garden was renamed the Chinese Tea Garden. (The name was restored in 1984). During World War II, camps used for the internment of Japanese Americans in Texas included the Crystal City Internment Camp, the Kenedy Allen Detention Camp at Kenedy, Texas, the Federal Reformatory for Women in Seagoville, Fort Bliss in El Paso, and Fort Sam Houston in San Antonio. The University of Texas at Austin offered classes to some internees.

The first sushi bar in the state of Texas was Sakura, opened in 1962 by Eugene and Hisako Gondo, in Downtown Dallas. The Gondos, in 1966, created Tokyo Gardens in Houston; Tokyo Gardnes closed in 1998.

== Japanese Texans ==
- Frank Fujita
- Conan Gray
- John Ishiyama
- Riki Kobayashi
- Jay Kochi
- Naoko Shibusawa
- William Tsutsui

== See also ==
- History of the Japanese in Houston
- Japanese School of Dallas
- Japanese Language Supplementary School of Houston
