= Mykawa =

Mykawa may refer to:

- Mykawa, Houston
- Shinpei Mykawa
