= History of the Japanese in Houston =

This article discusses Japanese Americans and Japanese citizens in Houston and Greater Houston.

As of the 2010 U.S. census, there were 3,566 people of Japanese descent in Harris County, making up 1.3% of the Asians in the county. In 1990 there were 3,425 ethnic Japanese in the county, making up 3.1% of the county's Asians, and in 2000 there were 3,574 ethnic Japanese in the county, making up 1.9% of the county's Asians. Patsy Yoon Brown, the director of the Japan-America Society of Houston (JASH, ヒューストン日米協会 Hyūsuton Nichibei Kyōkai), stated in 2013 that the Japanese American community in Houston had about 3,000 people, and that, as paraphrased by Minh Dam of the Houston Chronicle, is "a relatively small number compared to other Asian-American communities in the area".

== History ==
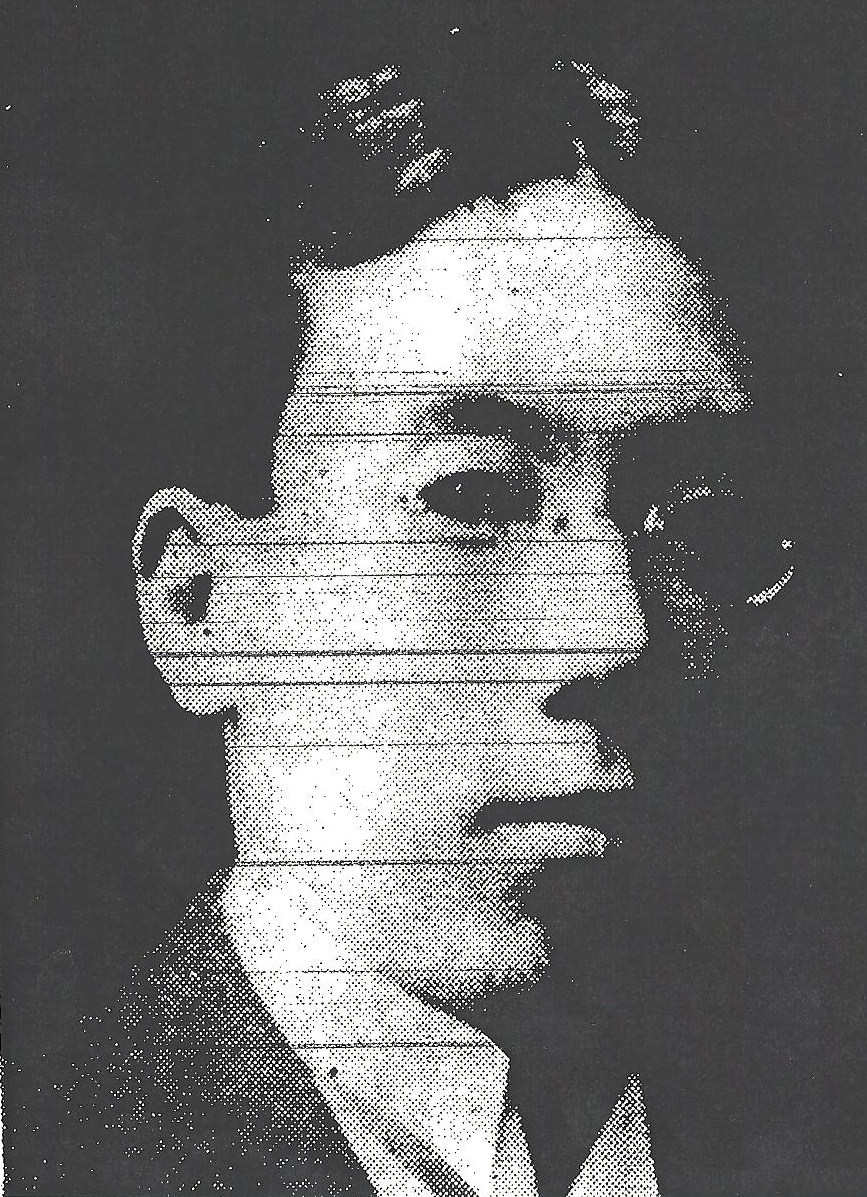
Shinpei Mykawa

A few Japanese, mostly working as laborers, were present in Houston by 1900, and due to a lack of required English knowledge some Japanese in Houston opened small restaurants that catered to working-class people and served inexpensive American meals. In the 1890s a man named Tsunekichi Okasaki, who took the American name "Tom Brown", opened a Japanese restaurant in Downtown Houston, which employed many recently arrived Japanese Texans.

Sadatsuchi Uchida visited Houston in 1902. There, city leaders of Houston told him that they were interested in allowing Japanese people to operate and own rice colonies. In Japan Uchida talked about the information with friends and published literature in that told about the rice-growing opportunities. Seito Saibara arrived in 1902, or 1903, and after meeting newspaper editors, bank presidents, and a Southern Pacific Railroad "colonization agent", he purchased land on a railroad near Webster, Texas, using Uchida's advice. He used a type of rice that could grow well in Texas, the shinriki grain. Saibara took his wife and 14-year-old son with him to Texas. Saibara convinced Japanese men to work for him, and paid bonuses for men who brought wives with them. Saibara was the first Japanese person who Uchida had convinced to establish a rice plantation in Texas. The Webster farming colony was 225-acre (91 ha) in size. After the Louisiana Purchase Exposition, the 1904 World's Fair in St. Louis, Missouri, prominent Japanese people visited his colony and other Japanese attempted to start rice farming. Sen Katayama, a socialist, started a rice colony and failed, while Rihei Onishi, a journalist, succeeded with his venture with his cousin Toraichi. Shinpei Mykawa, who had visited Texas in 1904 during a trip to the World's Fair, returned there in 1906. After he died in an accident that year, the Santa Fe railroad officials renamed the railroad stop in his community from Erin Station to "Mykawa" and Mykawa Road received its name from Mykawa.

Okasaki later began a rice farming operation by 1907, established two more restaurants including one Japanese restaurant, and in 1911 established the Japan Art and Tea Company. After World War I the price of rice fell.

Existing Japanese residents lobbied for, and received, exceptions from a law which disallowed land ownership by Japanese people that was passed in the 1920s.

The Japanese owners of the Webster farming colony lost much of their land during the Great Depression.

Thomas K. Walls, the author of the book The Japanese Texans, stated that Japanese Texans, including Japanese Houstonians, were generally treated well, unlike Japanese in California. Texas was not in proximity to the anti-Japanese attitudes in California. Karkabi wrote "The World War II years were one of the few times Japanese-Texans encountered problems." Abbie Salyers Grubb, author of "From "Tom Brown" to Mykawa Road: The Impact of the Japanese American Community of Houston in the Twentieth Century," wrote that compared to other American cities, "Houston did not see as much racial prejudice" targeting ethnic Japanese. Japanese business owners, including Okasaki, changed business names that reflected Japanese origin; Okasaki changed his restaurant's name to "U.S. Café". After the war ended, Okasaki went back to Japan.

For a period the place Mykawa had a community of Japanese rice farmers. John M. Moore of the Houston Post said that it "seems to be" that salt water and waste oil introduced by a nearby oil field destroyed some rice field crops cultivated by the Japanese farmers, causing them to leave the area before World War II; Moore said that area residents erroneously believed that the farmers left as a result of World War II. By 1951 the nearest Japanese farmers were located near Minnetex. During that year many of the Japanese farmers formerly in Mykawa resided in north Harris County. In 1957 reporters from The Asahi Shimbun interviewed Saibara's son Kiyoaki and his wife Takako. In 1974 the state of Texas erected a historical marker on Old Galveston Road that commemorated the Saibara family.

The City of Webster named a road "M Kobayashi Road" after rice farmer Mitsutaro Kobayashi.

In 1960 the ethnic Japanese in the Houston area lived around Webster, and no ethnic Japanese were in the Houston city limits. A consulate restarted operations in 1959 and multiple Japanese businesses began operating in the Houston area. Companies that began having Houston-based employees included Mizuho Financial Group and Mitsubishi.

By 1991, Interstate 45 bordered the area of the original farm. A Fiesta Mart opened. In 1991, there were two members of the Webster rice colony who were still alive. One of them, Kichi Kagawa, lived with her son Bill on a 30-acre (12 ha) plot of land that was once part of the original farm. The name of Kichi's husband and Bill's father was Yonekichi.

In 2015 the Japanese Business Association of Houston (ヒューストン日本商工会 Hyūsuton Nihon Shōkōkai) had 681 members. Its membership had increased by 50 percent in a two-year span.

== Demographics ==
Bruce Glasrud, a historian, stated that the real figure of ethnic Korean residents in Texas and Houston may be higher than official U.S. Census estimates as some previous Korean immigrants were counted as Japanese, as Korea was then under the Empire of Japan.

== Economy ==
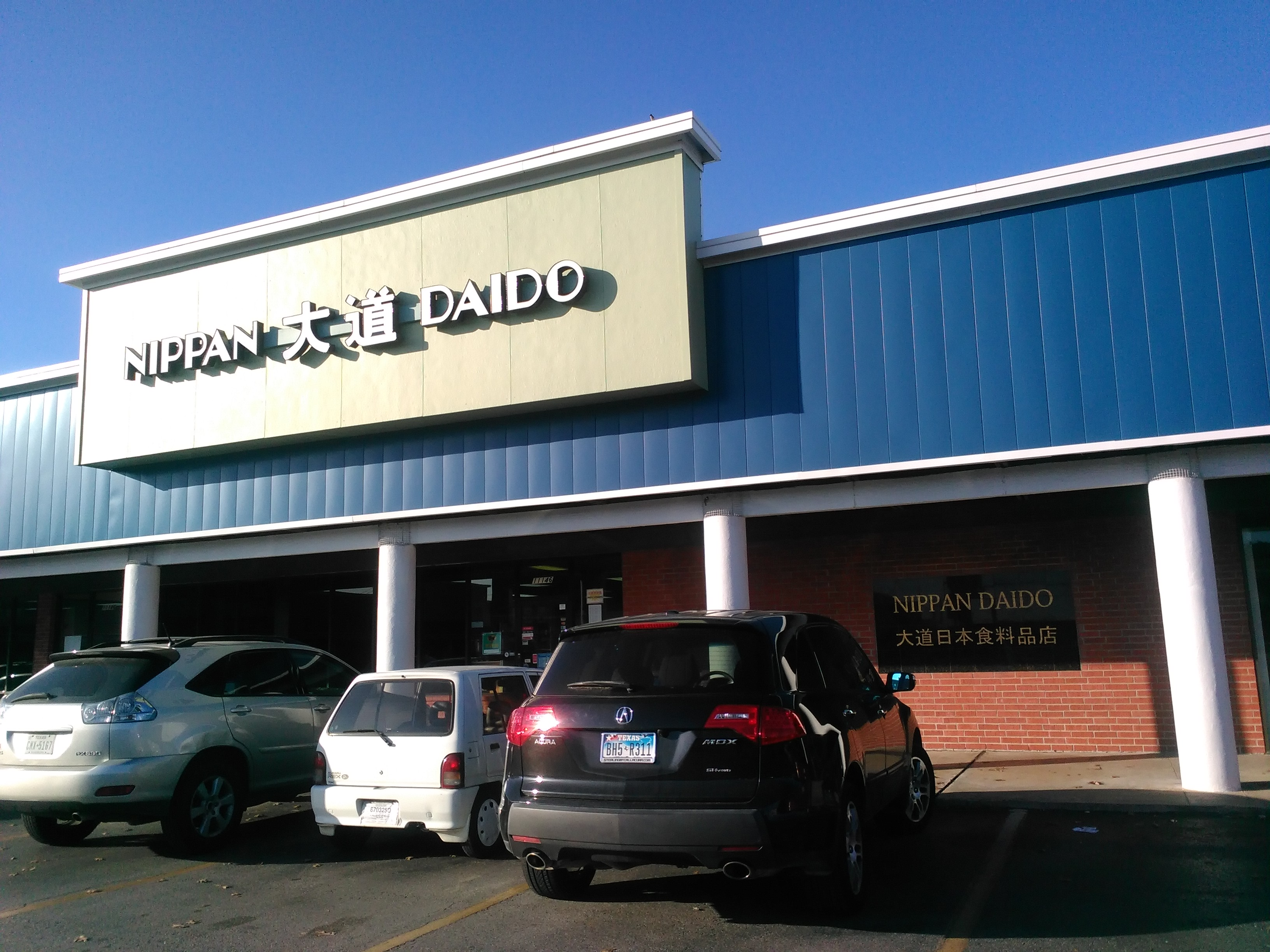
Nippan Daido

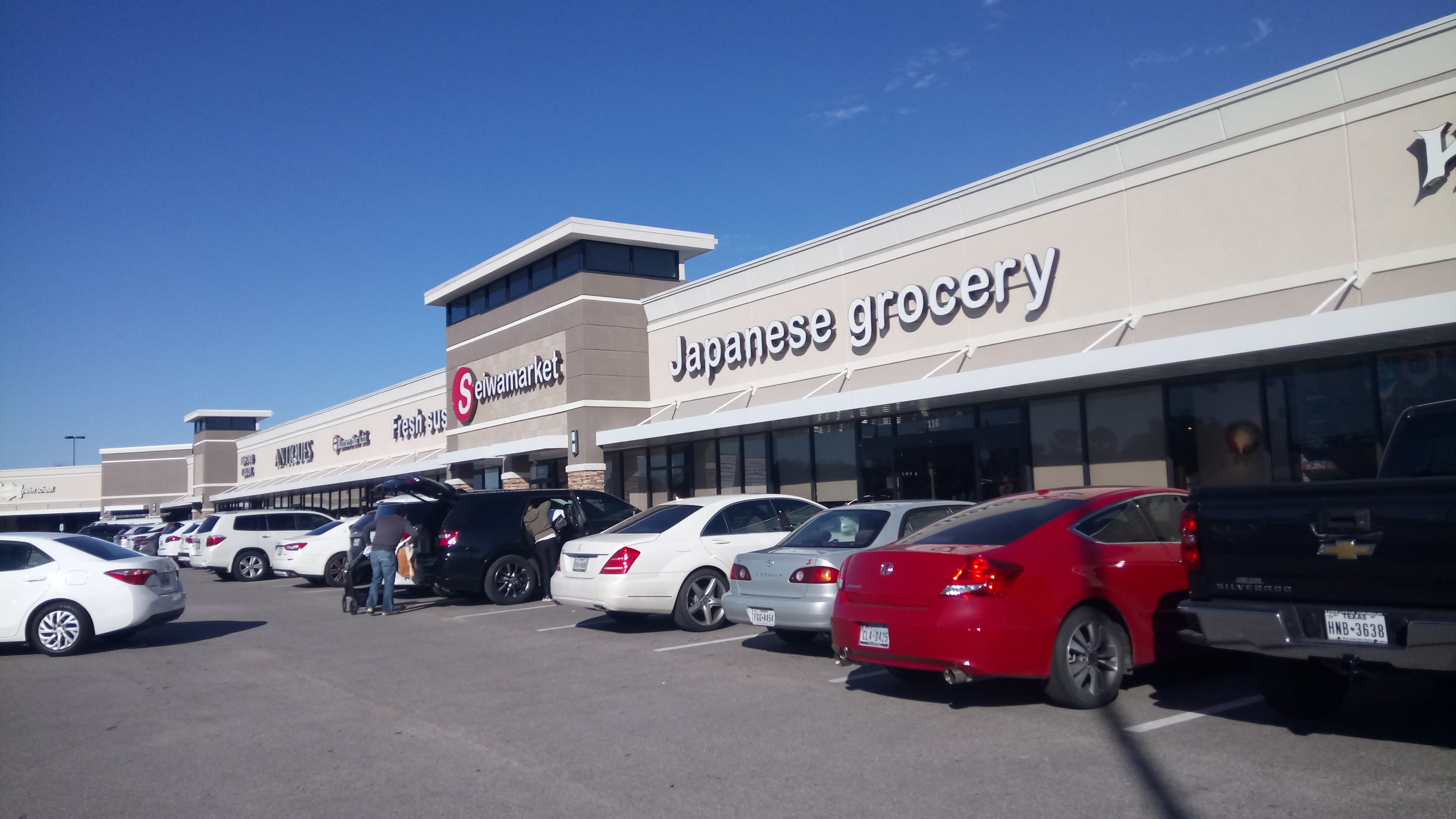
Seiwa Market

Houston's first Japanese grocery store, the Nippan Daido (大道日本食料品店 Daidō Nihon Shokuryōhinden) at Westheimer Road at Wilcrest, in the Westchase district. It opened in 1978. As of 1998 Japanese is the predominant language and most items are marked in Japanese and English. In 1988 Leslie Watts of the Houston Chronicle wrote that it is "[v]irtually identical in appearance, sound and smell to the small neighborhood markets found in Japan". As of 1988 the store offered noodles, fruits and vegetables, cigarettes, video rental, underwear and lingerie, socks, origami kits, toys, dolls, cockroach traps, and pharmaceuticals. As of 1998 the store offered fish, teas, soy sauces, frozen potstickers and dumplings, alcohol, tofu sauces, miso soups, rice cookers, chopsticks, and Japanese videos. It was a branch of a chain based in White Plains, New York; In 1988 this chain, a Japanese American business, had four other U.S. locations. The store's fortunes declined as other shops owned by larger corporations opened, resulting in its September 2019 closure. Toyo Hagiwara and another person acquired the shop and reopened it in December of that year.

In 2015 Hideo Matsujiro, a cofounder of Marukai Market, announced that he planned to open the first large Japanese grocery in Houston; the store was scheduled to open in the fall of 2015 at the Ashford Village shopping center in the Houston Energy Corridor. The shopping center was previously unoccupied. The store, called "Seiwa Market" (セイワ・マーケット Seiwa Māketto), held a "soft opening" in August 2016. A realtor named Susan Kwok Annoura stated in 2016 that the development of Seiwa and some adjacent Japanese businesses may start a "Japantown" in Houston.

As of 2015 there is a Japanese household goods store in the Houston Chinatown called "Fit." As of 2019 there was also a Daiso and a Kinokuniya.

Some Japanese restaurants in Houston are owned by persons of Japanese backgrounds, although the majority are not. There was a restaurant named Tokyo Gardens, established by people of Japanese ancestry, which opened in 1968. The owners, Eugene and Hisako Gondo, originated from California and had been interned as part of the Internment of Japanese Americans during World War II. The couple had opened a Japanese restaurant in Dallas before opening the Houston restaurant, and later sold their other restaurants. The restaurant stopped operations in 1998. Erica Cheng of the Houston Chronicle wrote that during the period it was active, it "was Houston’s premier Japanese restaurant". In 1978 W.L. Taitte stated in Texas Monthly that the restaurant, which had servers do Japanese dances, "tries hard with the Japanese act for frustrated tourists." According to the owner of Nippon, a restaurant in Montrose which opened in 1986 and was operated by an ethnic Japanese owner, Japanese baseball players who were in the Houston area went to that restaurant. Nippon was scheduled to close in November 2024. Some Japanese restaurants in Houston were previously owned by persons of Japanese heritage but were later sold to other owners.

== Education ==
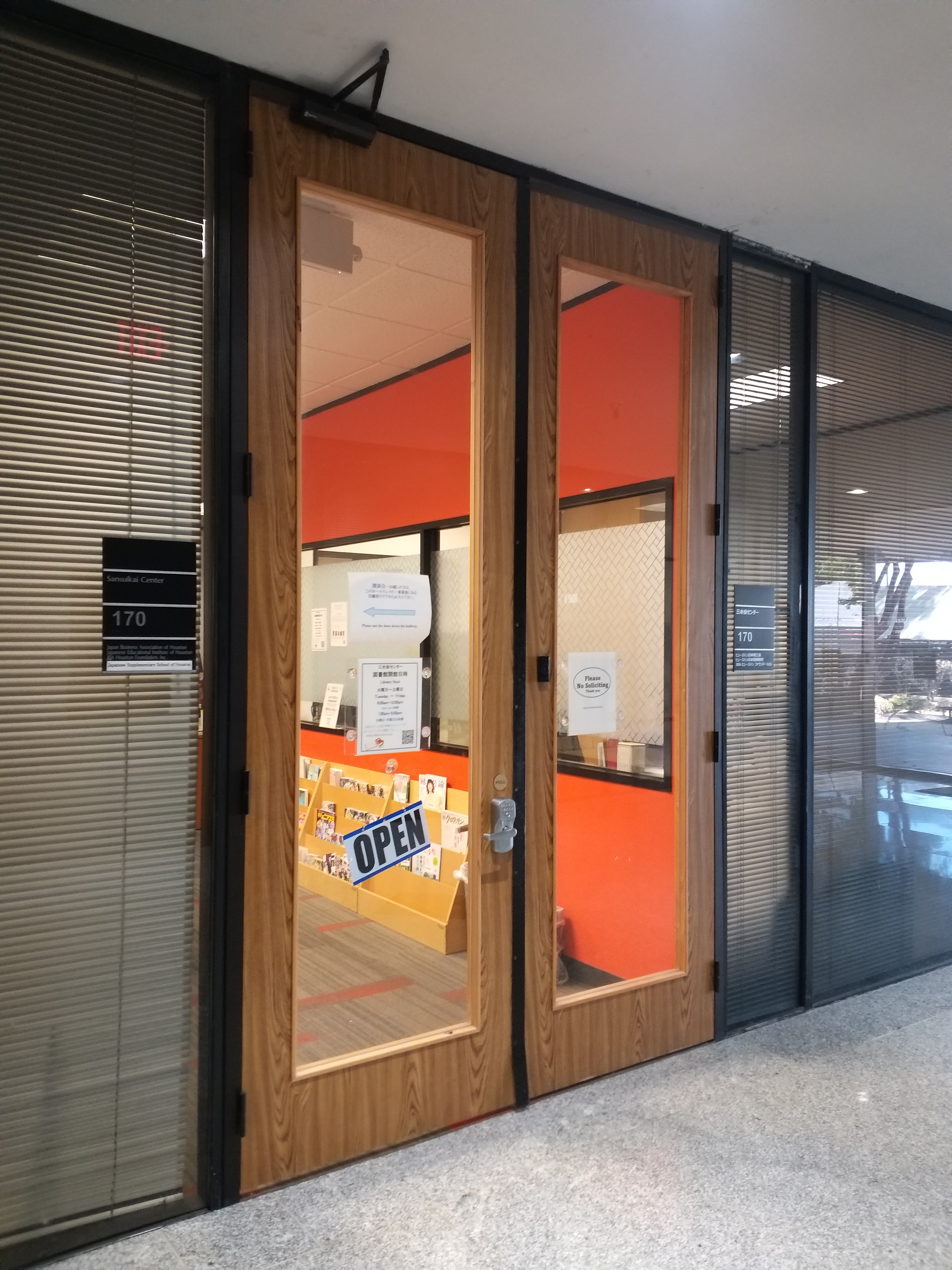
Sansui-Kai Center - Includes the Sansui-Kai Center Library and offices of the Japan Business Association of Houston, the Japanese Educational Institute of Houston, and the JBA Houston Foundation Inc.

As of 2016 the following public schools have the highest enrollments of Japanese students:

- Elementary: Barbara Bush, Ray K. Daily, and Roberts elementary schools in Houston ISD; Bunker Hill Elementary School in Spring Branch ISD, Nottingham Country Elementary School in Katy ISD; and John F. Ward Elementary School in Clear Creek ISD
- Middle: West Briar Middle School in Houston ISD, Spring Forest Middle School and Memorial Middle School in SBISD
- High: Stratford High School in SBISD

The Japanese Language Supplementary School of Houston, a supplementary Japanese school, is located in the city. Its classes are held at the Westchester Academy for International Studies. and the school office is located in the Memorial Ashford Place office building. The school, operated by the Japanese Educational Institute (JEI, ヒューストン日本語教育振興会 Hyūsuton Nihongo Kyōiku Shinkō Kai), is for children between ages 5 and 18 who are Japanese speakers. Many of the students are temporarily residing in the United States. The JEI had been established due to the growth of Japanese businesses in the 1970s.

There is one Japanese-language library in Houston, the Sansui-Kai Center Library (三水会センター・図書館).

== Recreation ==
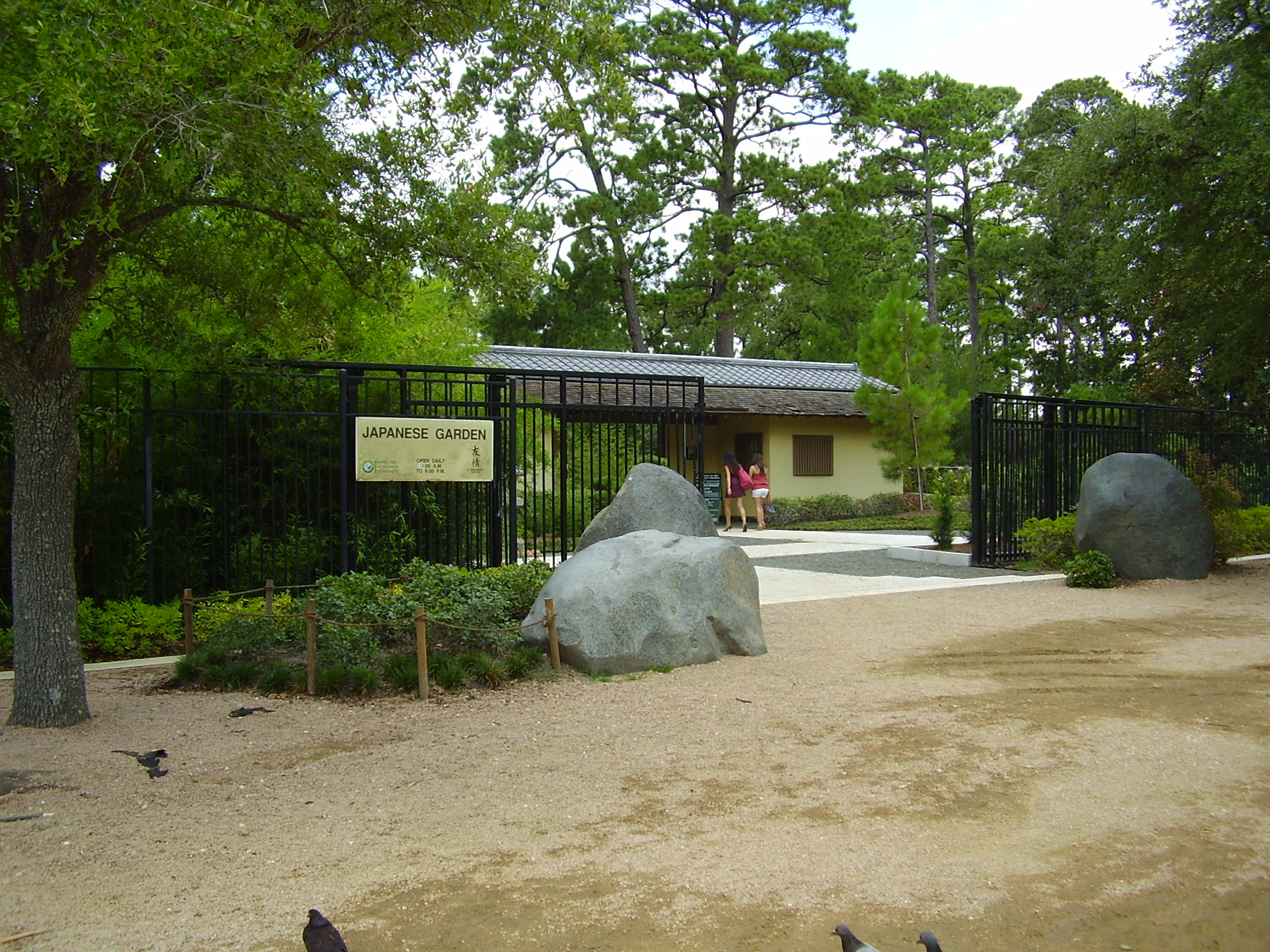
Japanese Garden

The Japanfest (Japan Festival), sponsored by the Japan-America Society of Houston, is annually held at Hermann Park. It is the only outdoor festival of its type permitted to be held at the park. In 2013 almost 2,700 people attended that year's festival.

Hermann Park is also home to a Japanese garden supported by businesspeople of Japanese origins.

== Institutions ==
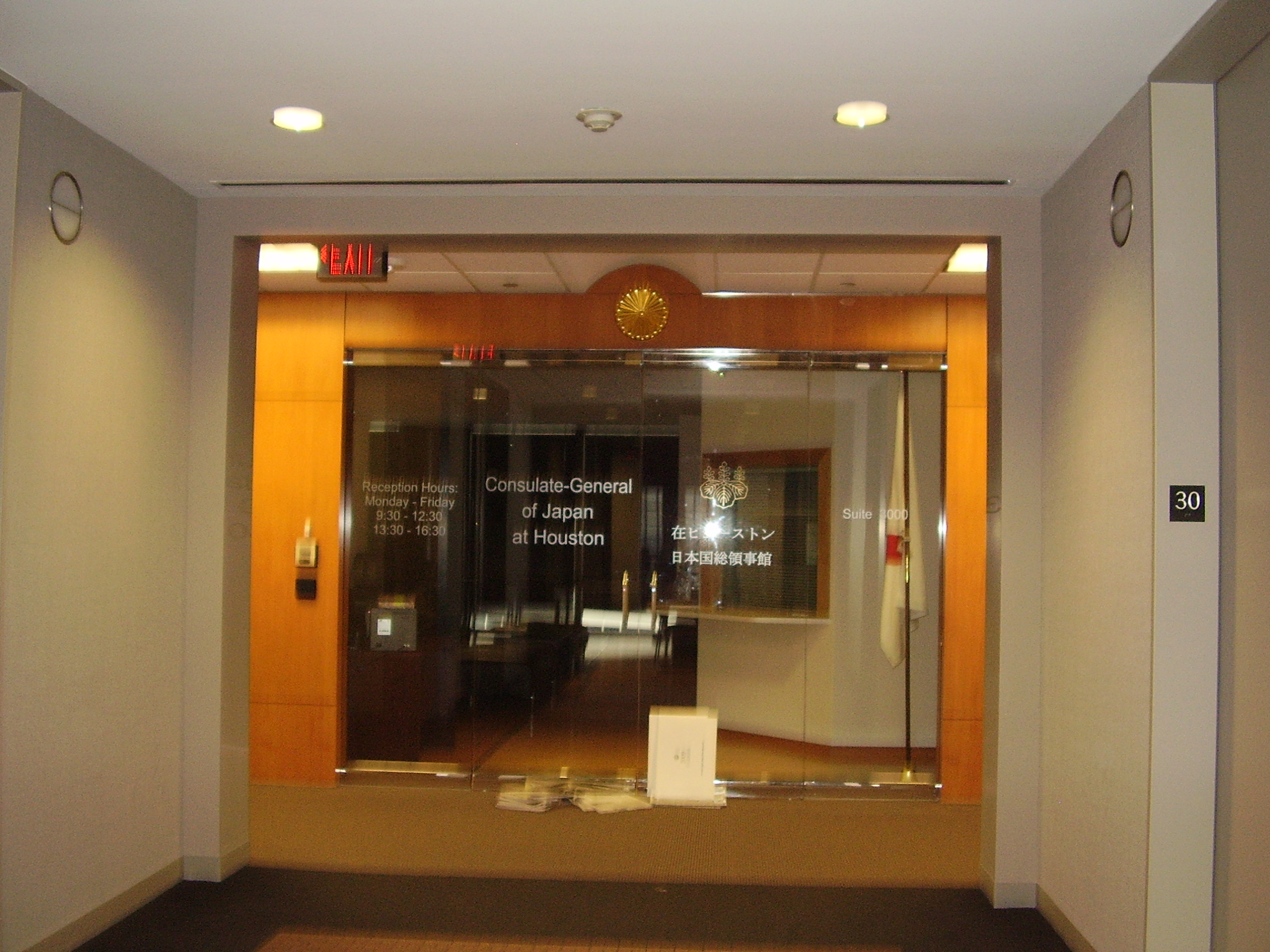
Consulate-General of Japan in Houston

The Consulate-General of Japan in Houston is located in 2 Houston Center in Downtown Houston. The consulate serves Texas and Oklahoma.

== Transportation ==
In 1999 Continental Airlines began its services from George Bush Intercontinental Airport to Narita International Airport near Tokyo. The City of Houston had been pursuing flights to Tokyo since 1969. Continental originally scheduled for the flights to begin on December 30, 1998. Continental obtained the rights after U.S. and Japanese authorities agreed to allow for new services between the two countries. Continental has since merged into United Airlines.

In 2015 All Nippon Airways began services from Tokyo Narita to Houston Bush. ANA CEO Osamu Shinobe cited the presence of Japanese companies in the Houston area as one of the reasons his company started Houston services.

== Notable residents ==
- Shinpei Mykawa
- Seito Saibara

== Gallery ==
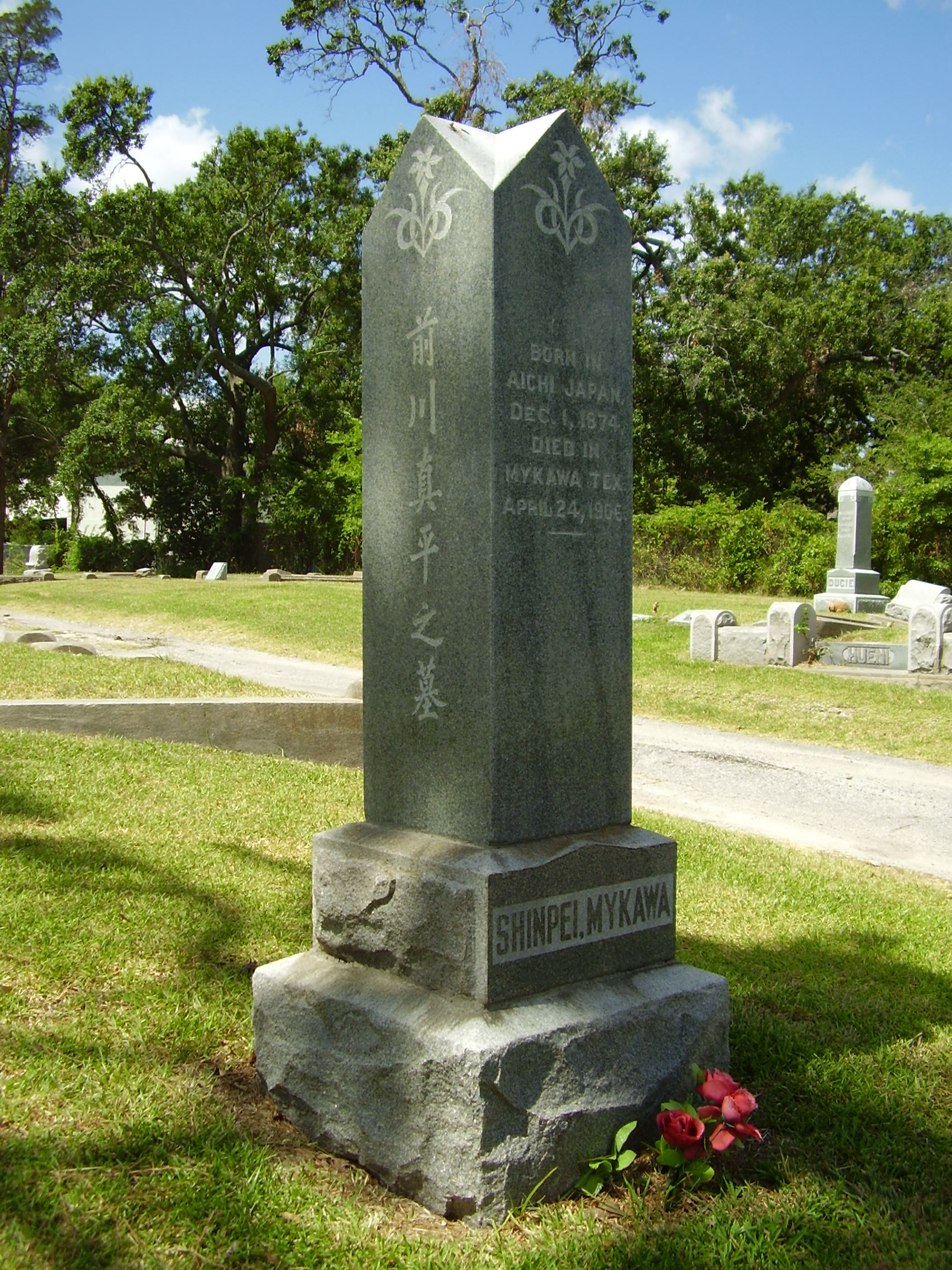
Grave of Shinpei Mykawa, Hollywood Cemetery
