= Cracked Ice screen =

Late 18th-century Japanese screen

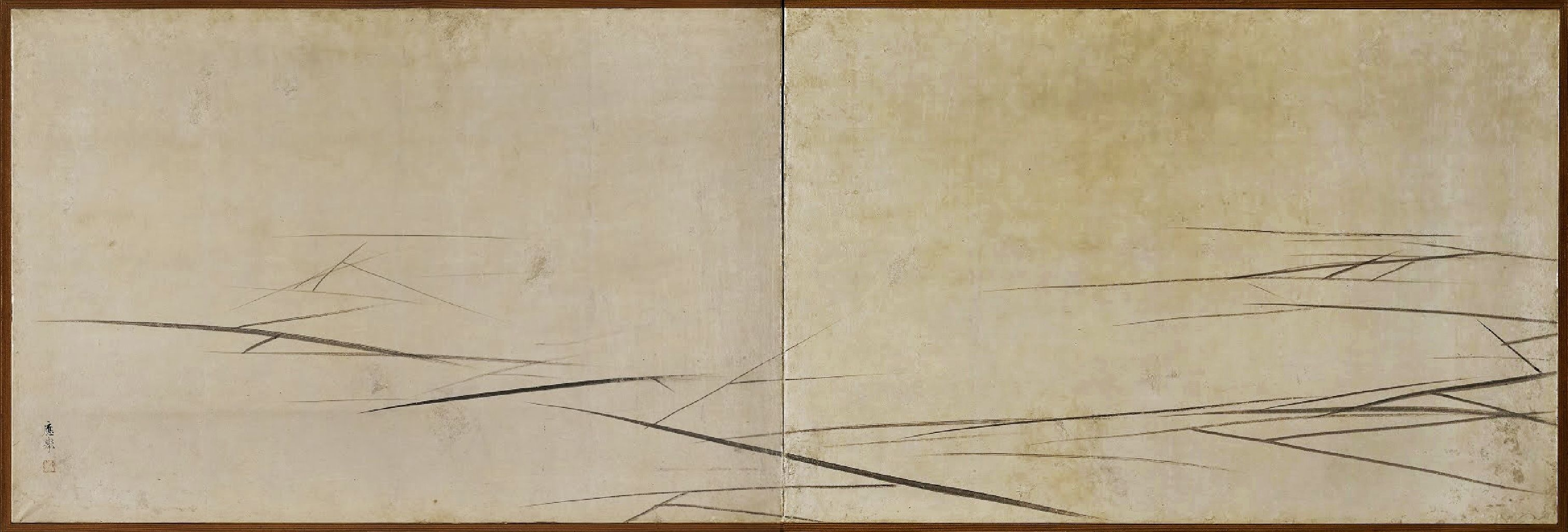
Maruyama Ōkyo, Cracked Ice, late 18th century, British Museum

The Cracked Ice screen is a late 18th-century low two-fold Japanese screen (byōbu) intended for use at the Japanese tea ceremony. It was created in the Edo period and is signed and sealed by the artist, Maruyama Ōkyo (1733–1795), founder of the Maruyama school of realist painting. It would be used as a furosaki byōbu (風炉先屏風, literally "furnace folding screen") placed near the hearth of a room used for the Japanese tea ceremony, shielding the fire from draughts and also forming a decorative backdrop behind the tea utensils (茶道具, chadōgu). It may have been intended to be used in the summer, to evoke the cool of the winter.

The low screen has a frame of unvarnished cedar wood measuring 63.3 cm × 185 cm (24.9 in × 72.8 in) which holds two paper panels, mostly white with a few bold markings of black ink and flecks of glittering mica, indicating an expanse of ice on a lake which is cracking, receding into the distance. It is signed and sealed "應擧" (Ōkyo). The minimal composition is typical of that portion of the Edo period and is an early example of the influence of Western painting on Japanese art. Ōkyo had been commissioned to make new artworks with a Western vanishing point, learning the technique from Rangaku or "Dutch Studies", and he employed his new skill with this screen.

The screen was bought by the British Museum in 1982 from Milne Henderson Fine Art. An inscription on its box indicates that it was owned at one time by the Maekawa family.
