= Kiyoaki =

- Gender: Male

Origin
- Origin: Japanese
- Meaning: Different meanings depending on the kanji used

Kiyoaki (written: 清顕) is a masculine Japanese given name. Notable people with the name include:

- Kiyoaki Saibara (1884–1972), Japanese-born American farmer
- Tamura Kiyoaki (田村 清顕; ????–1586) Japanese samurai and head of the Tamura clan
