= Mykawa, Houston =

Area of Houston, Texas, United States

Coordinates: 29.6208°N 95.3134°W

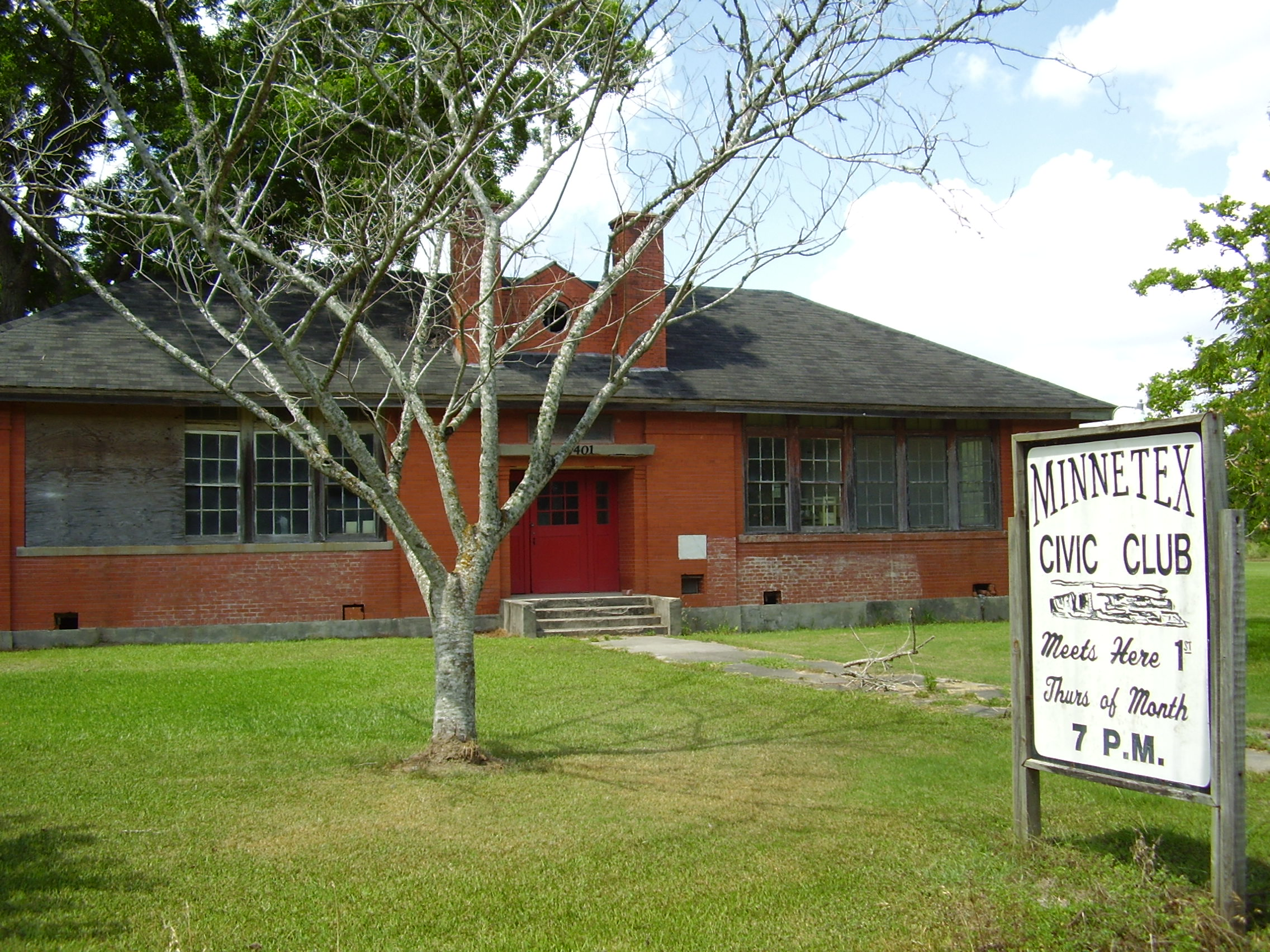
The former Mykawa School

Mykawa (/mɪˈkɑːwə/ mi-KAH-wə) is an area within Houston, Texas, United States that was formerly a distinct unincorporated community in Harris County.

== History ==
Mykawa was named after a Japanese nurseryman named Shinpei Mykawa, who, by 1906, introduced the cultivation of rice in the area. The community was renamed from Erin Station after Mykawa died after he fell underneath one of his pieces of agricultural equipment. Officials from the Santa Fe Railroad Company renamed the station after Mykawa, and many Japanese immigrants to Texas perceived it as a place friendly to Asian Americans because of the town's naming. Mykawa's name, as the town name and the name of Mykawa Road, is pronounced differently from the actual Japanese name Maekawa.

For a period Mykawa had a community of Japanese rice farmers. John M. Moore of the Houston Post said that it "seems to be" that salt water and waste oil introduced by a nearby oil field destroyed some rice field crops cultivated by the Japanese farmers, causing them to leave the area before World War II; Moore said that area residents erroneously believed that the farmers left as a result of World War II. By 1951 the nearest Japanese farmers were located near Minnetex. During that year many of the Japanese farmers formerly in Mykawa resided in north Harris County.

In the 1940s and 1950s new additions were constructed in the area of nearby Sunnyside. Local residents of majority white Mykawa expressed dismay at this, as the 1948 Shelley v. Kraemer Supreme Court decision meant that neighborhoods could no longer have rules excluding people on the basis of race. Terroristic threats were made against the Sunnyside community.

In 1951 Moore said that Mykawa was losing its individual identity and was becoming a part of Houston. Moore said "I found out that Mykawa was gradually losing its individuality." Moore said that when he visited a general store where natives of the area said that they did most of their shopping, the clerk was unaware that there was a community called "Mykawa."

== Cityscape ==
Mykawa is located south of the Sims Bayou. The center of the Mykawa area is the intersection of Mykawa Road and Almeda-Genoa Road. As of 1951 the Mykawa School and the Mykawa Railroad Station were located there, and the Pearland water tower and Houston Municipal Airport (William P. Hobby Airport) were visible from this location. As of 1951, the residents other than the original settlers mainly lived on small farms. Some had enough money to build Colonial-style houses. In 1951 land had a cost of $1,000 per acre. John M. Moore of the Houston Post said "the flat plain is easily flooded, but the acreage is not what you would call cheap". At that time a man described by Moore as "[o]ne of the leading citizens" of Mykawa, W. B. Schulte, was selling acreage for the development of houses, a practice which Moore said "eventually will erase his community, no doubt".

== Government and infrastructure ==
The Houston Fire Department serves Mykawa. Previously the Mykawa Volunteer Fire Department, which had a station on Telephone Road, served the community.

In 1951 Moore said that "[a]bout the only public official" in the Mykawa area was the judge of the voting precinct of yearly elections, E. E. Forbes.

The Harris Health System (formerly Harris County Hospital District) designated the Martin Luther King Health Center in southeast Houston for the ZIP code 77048. The designated public hospital is Ben Taub General Hospital in the Texas Medical Center.

== Education ==
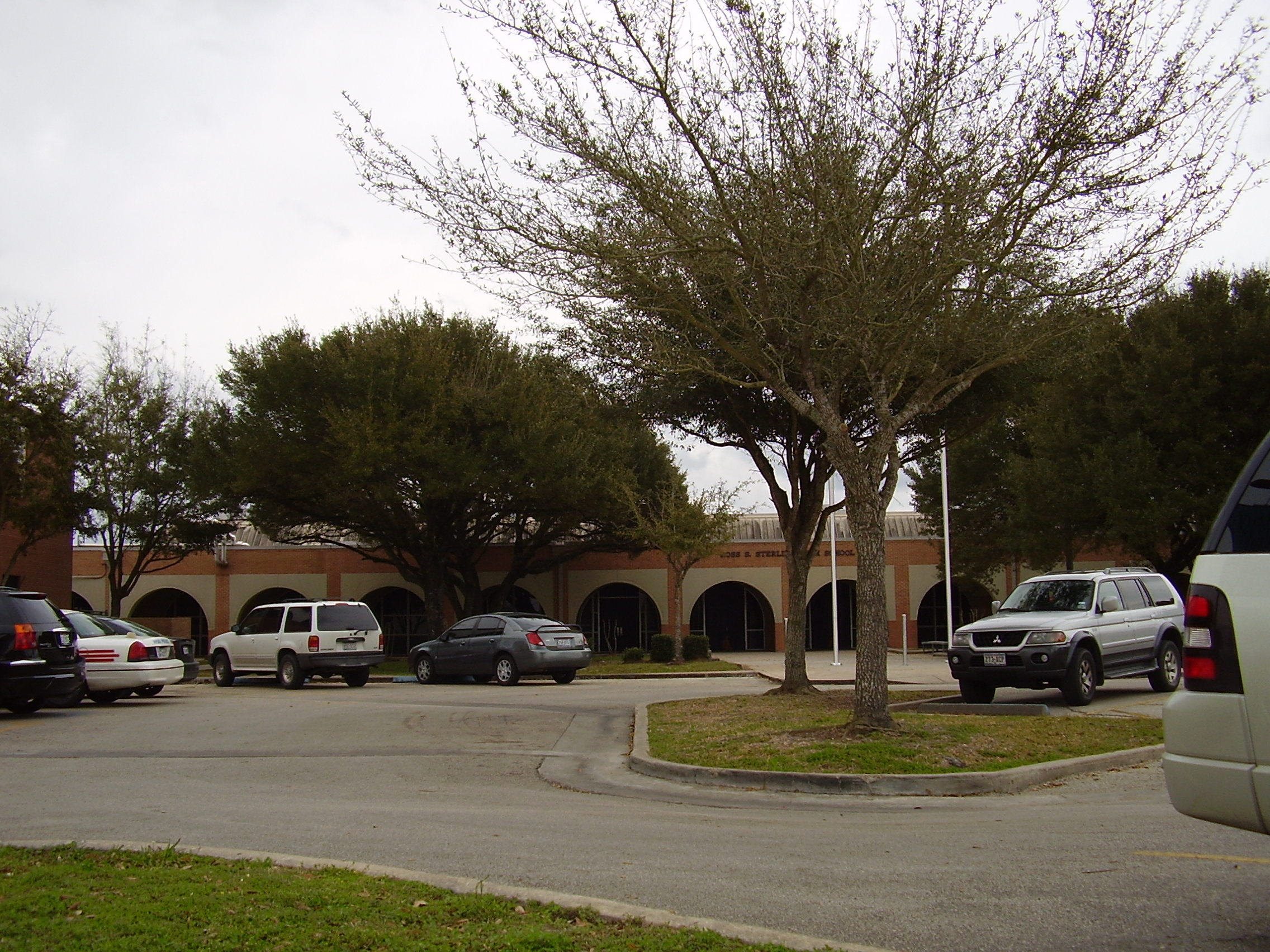
Sterling High School

Mykawa is within the Houston Independent School District.

Elementary schools serving portions of the Mykawa area include:

- Frost Elementary School
- Mitchell Elementary School

The area is served by the following secondary schools:

- Thomas Middle School
- Sterling High School

Originally the community was served by Harris County Common School District 45. The Mykawa School, a 20th-century one-room schoolhouse that was within the district, at one time served residents of Mykawa. The red brick building sits on 6.5 acres (2.6 ha) of land. The building was erected in 1923. By 1951 the family of Henry May, a school bus driver, was living there. John M. Moore of the Houston Post said that "half a dozen" school buses were parked in the front yard of the school. In 1951 students from Mykawa attended Garden Villas Elementary School in Garden Villas, Houston while older children attended high schools in Houston. The Minnetex Civic Club rents the building from its owner, the Houston Independent School District, to use as a meeting place. In 2002 the club wanted the school to be named a historical monument so the building would avoid demolition and receive a restoration. During that year, Terry McMillan, the president of the civic club, said that the school district did not want the building to be named a historic site as it would make it more difficult for the school district to sell the school. In 2003 the civic club held a festival in the former schoolhouse to raise awareness about the building. By that year the school's roof had partially collapsed.

== Recreation ==
Moore said in 1951 that the Mykawa Home Demonstration Club, was "one of the few community organizations" of the area. During that year it was trying to establish a civic club in Allison Park, near Minnetex, along with the clubs of Minnetex and South Acres.

== See also ==
- History of the Japanese in Houston
