= St. Agnes Cathedral (Kyoto) =

Historic church in Kyoto, Japan

Coordinates: 35°1′11.2″N 135°45′32.5″E

St Agnes Cathedral
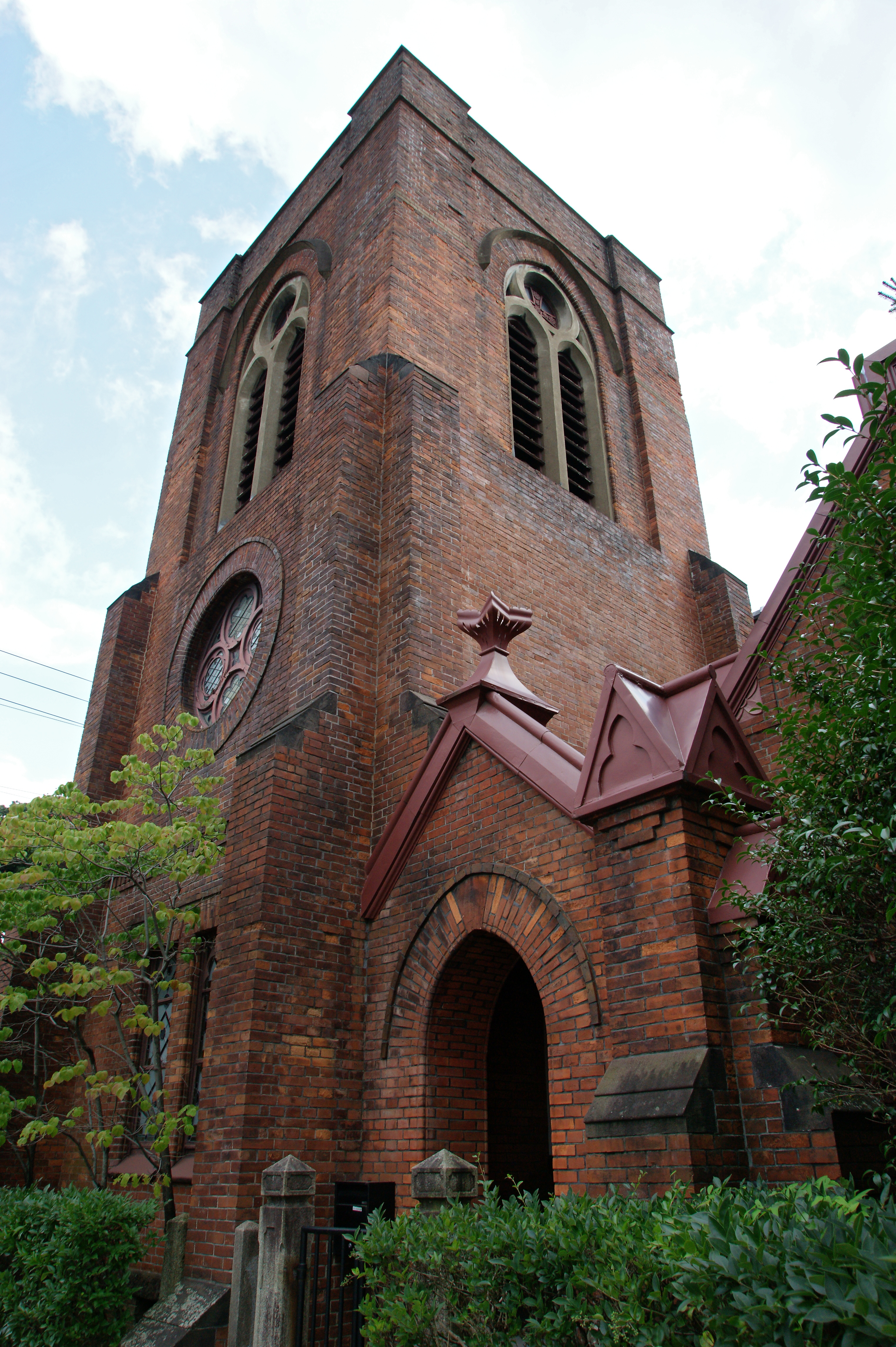
- St Agnes Cathedral
- Location: Kyoto
- Country: Japan
- Denomination: Anglican Church in Japan

History
- Former name: Holy Trinity Church

Architecture
- Completed: 1898

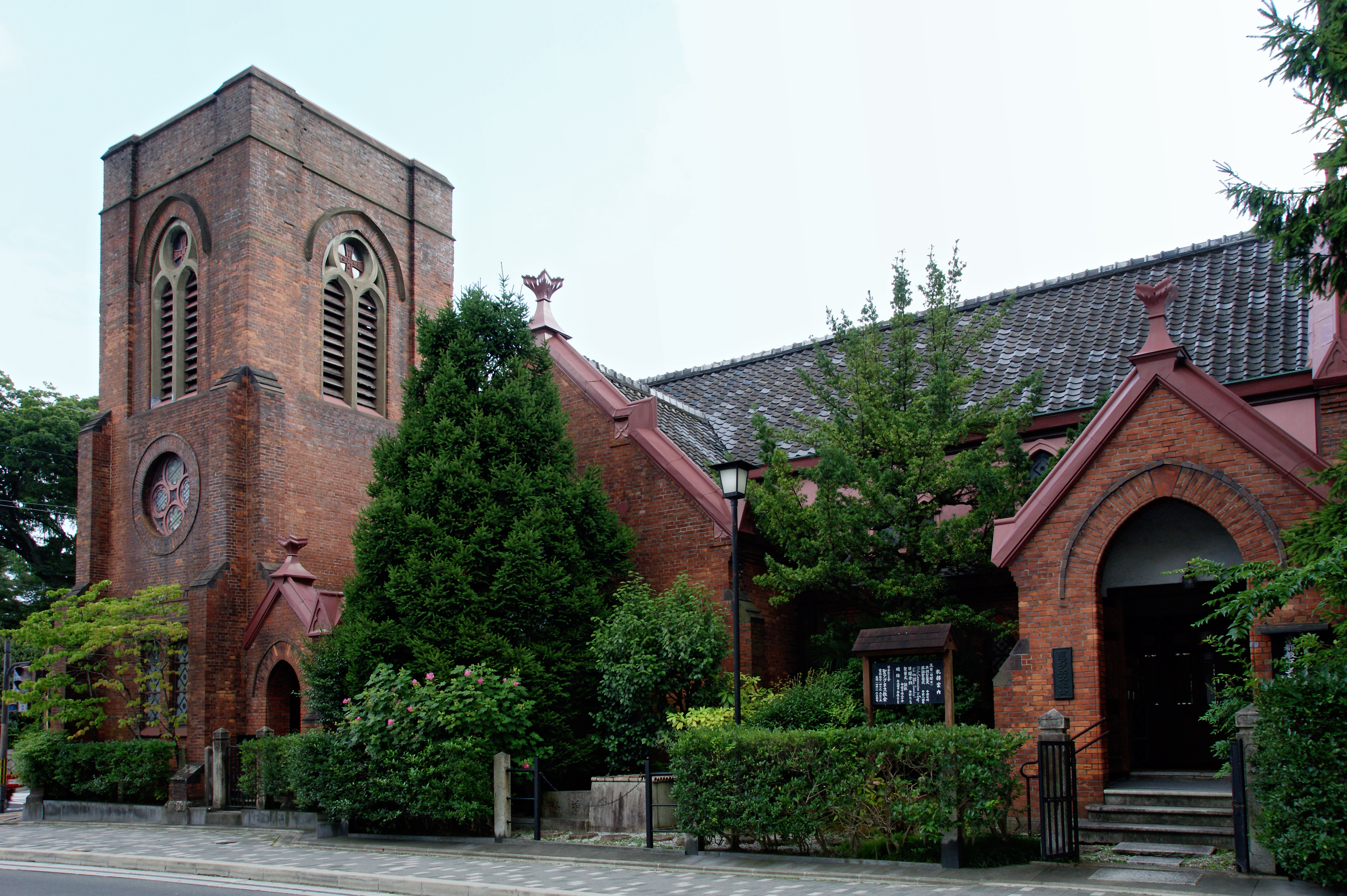

St. Agnes Cathedral is a Christian church located in Kyoto, Japan, and is the diocesan cathedral of the Diocese of Kyoto, which comprises all the Anglican-Episcopal churches and other facilities in Fukui, Ishikawa, Kyoto, Mie, Nara, Shiga, and Toyama, and Wakayama Prefectures.

== General ==
St. Agnes Cathedral was built as Holy Trinity Church in 1898 on the campus of Heian Women's University, but changed its name to St. Agnes Church in 1923.

The red brick, Gothic Revival church was designed by American architect James McDonald Gardiner. The cathedral is one of the oldest Christian church structures in Kyoto and was designated as one of the cultural heritage buildings of Kyoto City in 1985.

== See also ==
- Anglican Church in Japan
- Anglican Communion
- St. Andrew's Cathedral, Tokyo
- St. Andrew's Cathedral (Yokohama)
