= Japanese School of Dallas =

Coordinates: 32.932068°N 96.840427°W

- ダラス補習授業校
- 2001 Kelly Blvd., Carrollton, TX (classroom), 4101 McEwen Rd., Suite 245, Dallas, TX (office); 75006 (classroom), 75244 (office)

Information
- Established: June 1970
- Category: Hoshū jugyō kō
- Website: sites.google.com/jsdallas.org/public/home

The Japanese School of Dallas (ダラス補習授業校 Darasu Hoshū Jugyō Kō) is a part-time Japanese educational program for Japanese citizens and Japanese Americans located in the Dallas-Fort Worth metroplex. The school office in Dallas, and it conducts its classes at Ted Polk Middle School in Carrollton. As of 2015 Munetake Yamamura (山村 宗武 Yamamura Munetake) is the principal.

== History ==
The Dallas Japanese Association (ダラス日本人会 Darasu Nihonjinkai) established the school in June 1970 with 15 students and 1 teacher, with classes being held in Highland Park United Methodist Church. It previously had the English name Japanese Language Advancement School of Dallas, and classes were formerly held at Dan F. Long Middle School in Dallas, and before that the Pleasant View Baptist Church, White Rock United Methodist Church, and the North Carrollton Junior High School.

On Monday, July 25, 2016, the Japanese Association and the Japanese School offices moved to its current location in Dallas. The classroom location remained the same. Previously the school office was in Farmers Branch.

== Student demographics ==
As of 2014 the Japanese school had 400 students, most of whom are Japanese citizens who are children of company employees temporarily stationed in the U.S., and some of whom are Japanese Americans retaining their Japanese culture. That year school administration expected an additional 150 students to enroll over the subsequent two-year period due to Toyota Motor Sales, U.S.A., Inc. moving its headquarters to Plano.

== See also ==
- Japanese in Texas
- Japanese language education in the United States
