= James McDonald Gardiner =

American architect

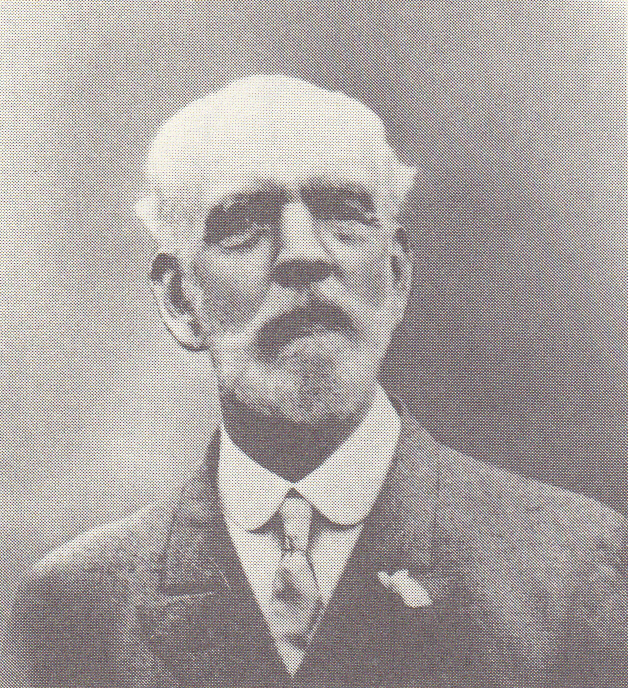
- James McDonald Gardiner
- Born: May 22, 1857; St. Louis, Missouri
- Died: November 25, 1925 (aged 68); Tokyo, Japan
- Education: Harvard University
- Occupation: Architect
- Buildings: St. Agnes Cathedral (Kyoto)

James McDonald Gardiner (May 22, 1857 – November 25, 1925) was an American architect, lay Anglican church missionary and educator who lived and worked in Japan during the Meiji period.

== Early life and education ==
Gardiner was born May 22, 1857 in St. Louis, Missouri, son of James McDonald and Margaret McCartney (Gordon) Gardiner, who was from a Jewish family. Educated at Hackensack Academy and Harvard University graduating with a degree in architecture in 1879.

== Mission work and architectural career in Japan ==
Gardiner first came to Japan in 1880 and designed numerous school, church and private residential buildings while in the country. As a lay missionary in the Anglican Church in Japan his connection with Bishop Channing Moore Williams and the work of US Episcopal Church mission was close, leading in part to his appointment as one of the first Presidents of St. Paul's School, the founding institution of Rikkyo University.

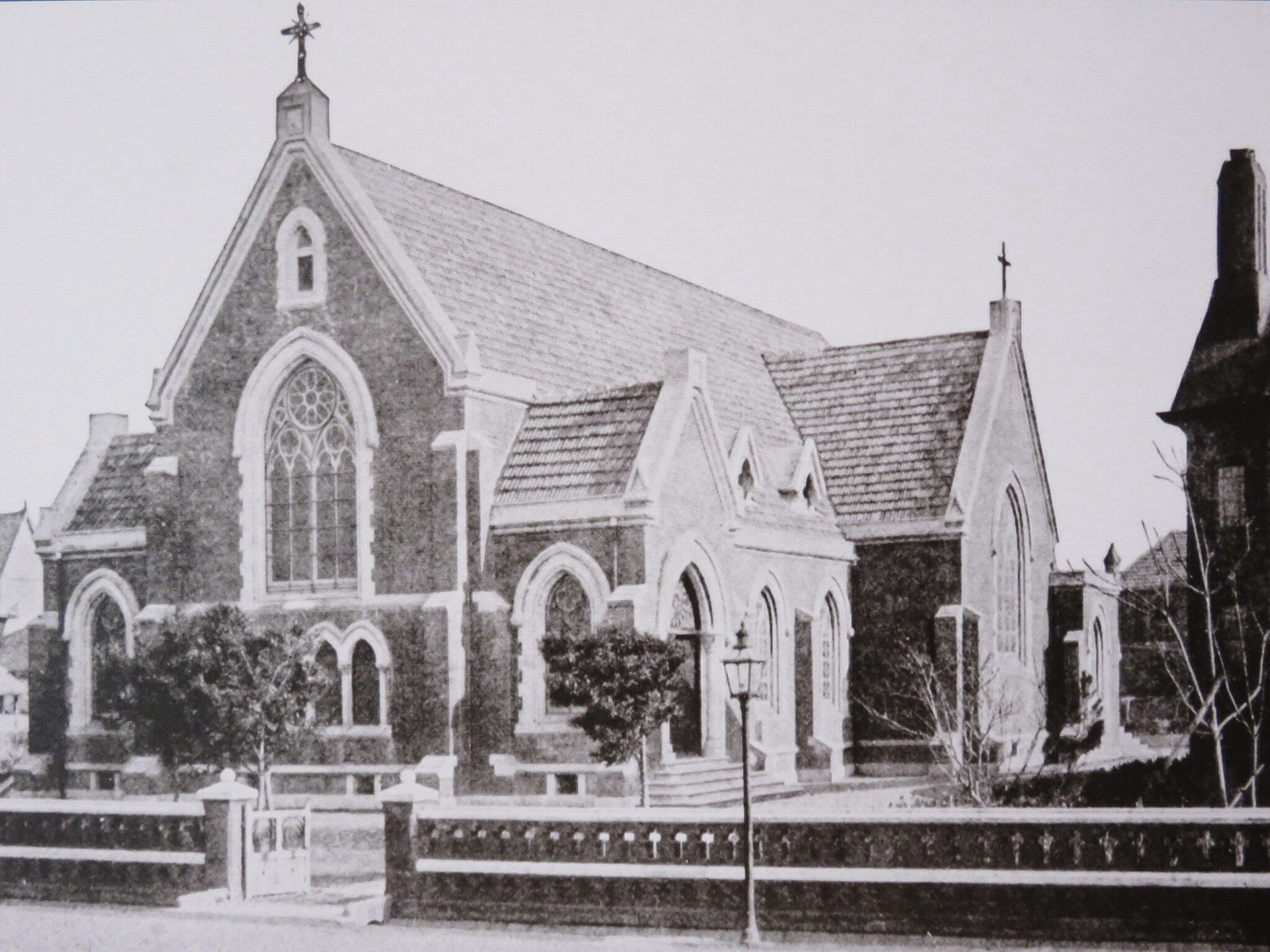
Holy Trinity Cathedral, Tsukiji completed in 1890

Gardiner's first task on arrival in Japan was to design and supervise the construction of new school and dormitory facilities for St. Paul's School in Tsukiji, Tokyo. The three-story, red brick, school buildings in an American Victorian Gothic style were completed in 1881, but suffered significant damage in an earthquake in 1894. Gardiner was also responsible for the design of adjacent Holy Trinity Cathedral, completed in 1890, which served as the center of Episcopal Church mission activity in the city.

Other than St. Agnes Cathedral (Kyoto), other buildings of note designed by Gardiner and still preserved in Japan include St. John's Church, Kyoto (1907), now in the historic building collection at Meiji-mura, and the former residence of Sadatsuchi Uchida, known as The Diplomat's House (1910), since 1995 a feature of the Italian Garden park in Yamate, Yokohama. Additionally, Ascension Church in Hirosaki, Aomori Prefecture, completed in 1921.

Grave located at the True Light Church, Nikkō, Tochigi, Japan; an Anglican church of his own design.

== Gallery ==
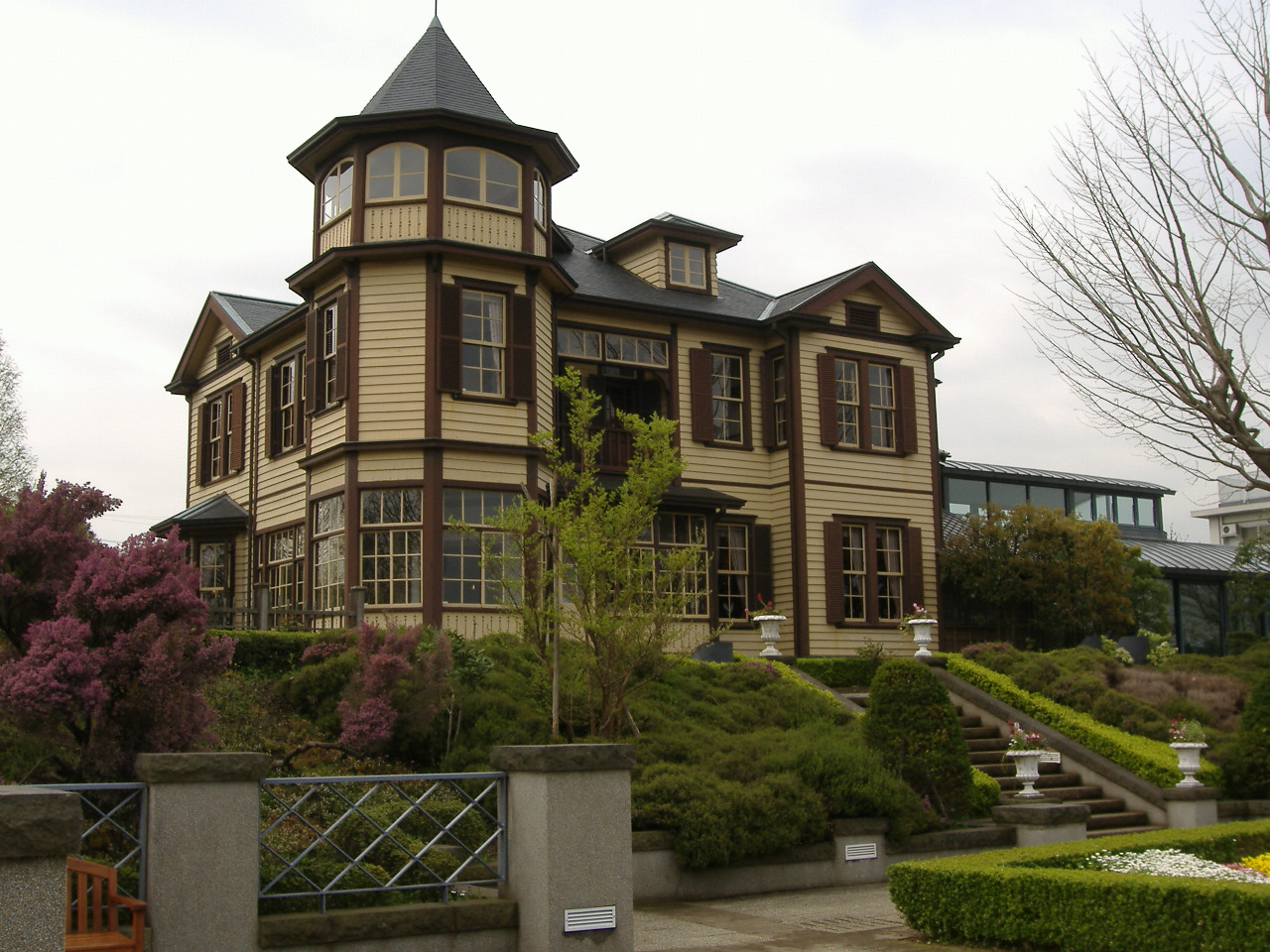
The Diplomat's House, Yamate, Yokohama

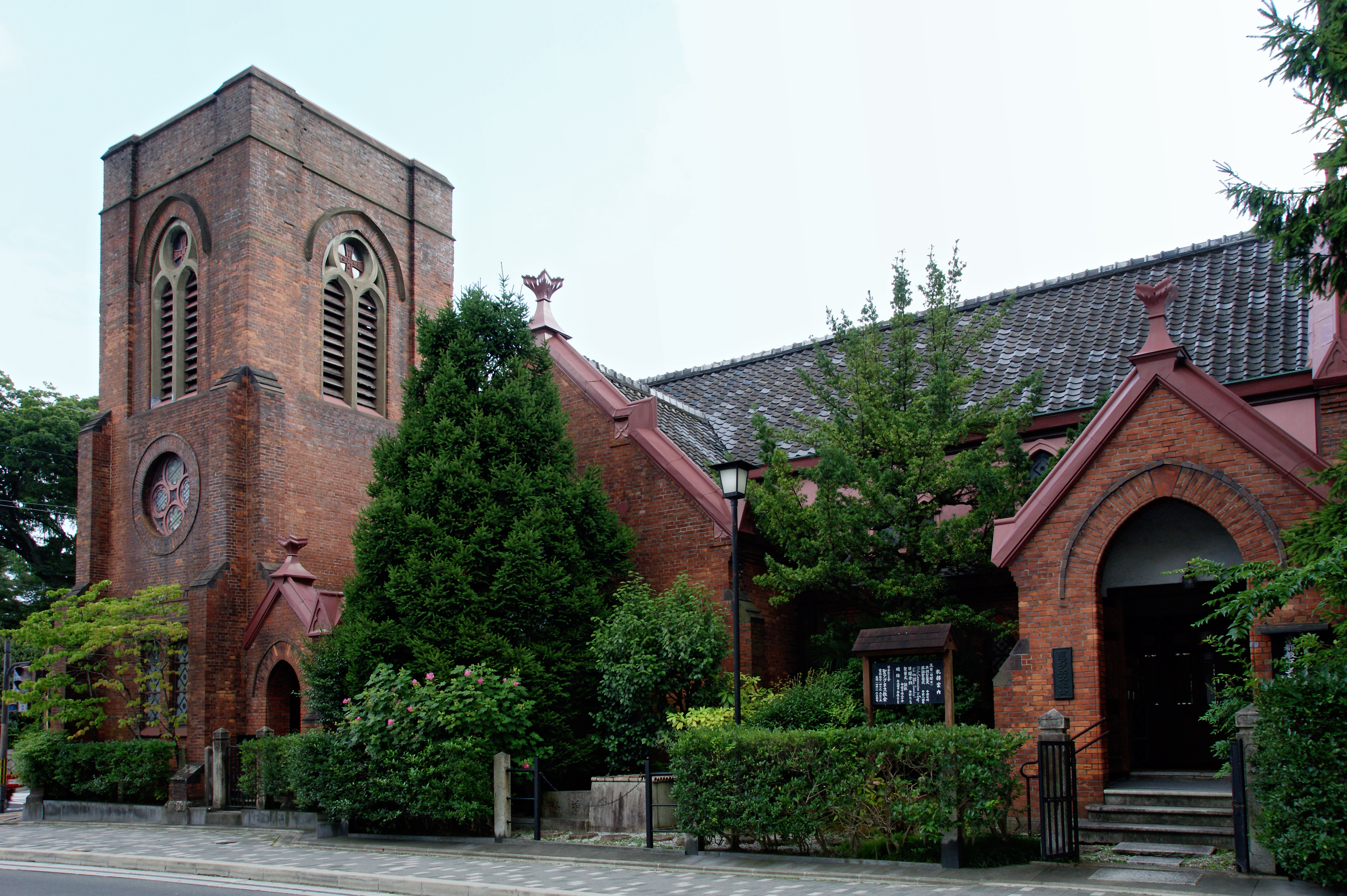
St. Agnes Cathedral (Kyoto)

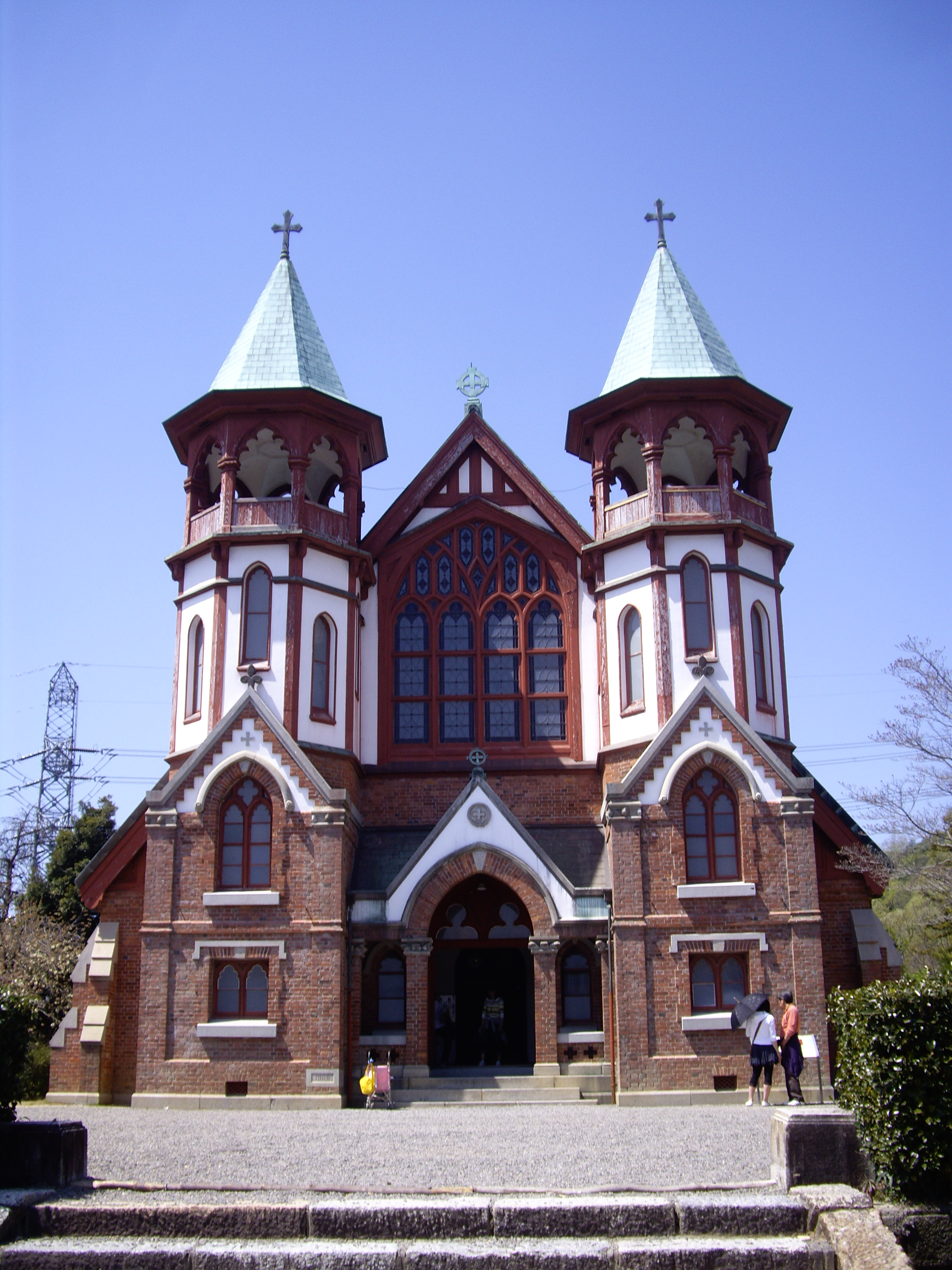
St. John's Church, Meiji-mura

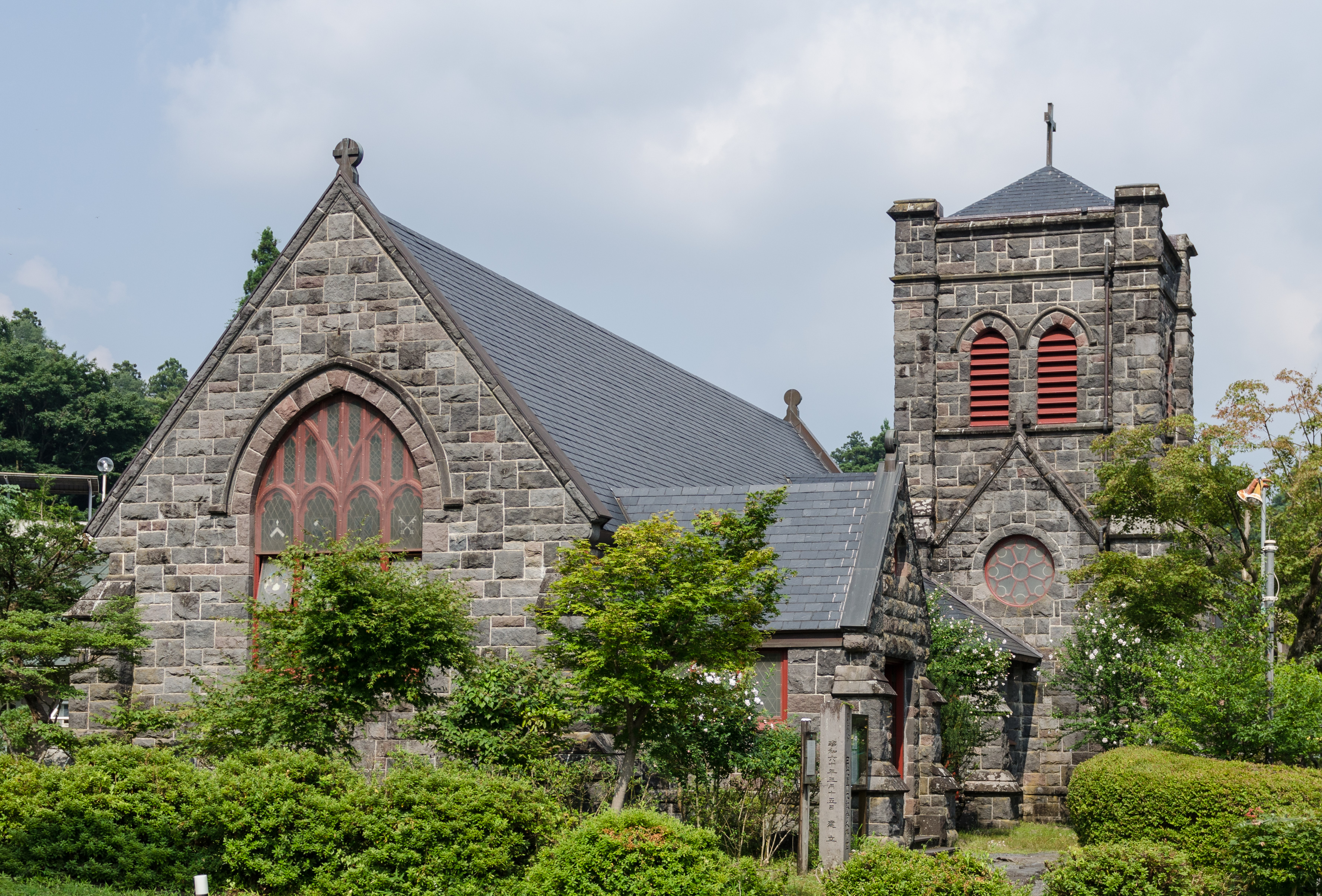
True Light Church, Nikko, Tochigi

== Family ==
Married Florence Rhodes Pitman, Principal of St. Margaret's School for Girls, Tokyo in 1882. One son; James Lawrence McDonald Gardiner and Three daughters; Hasu no Hana, Ernestine and Lillian.

- Eldest daughter, Hasu no Hana, married Episcopal missionary, Shirley Hall Nichols in 1916. In 1925 Nichols was elected to serve as the Episcopal Bishop of Kyoto.

== See also ==
- Rikkyo University
- Meiji-mura
