= Shinpei Mykawa =

Japanese farmer

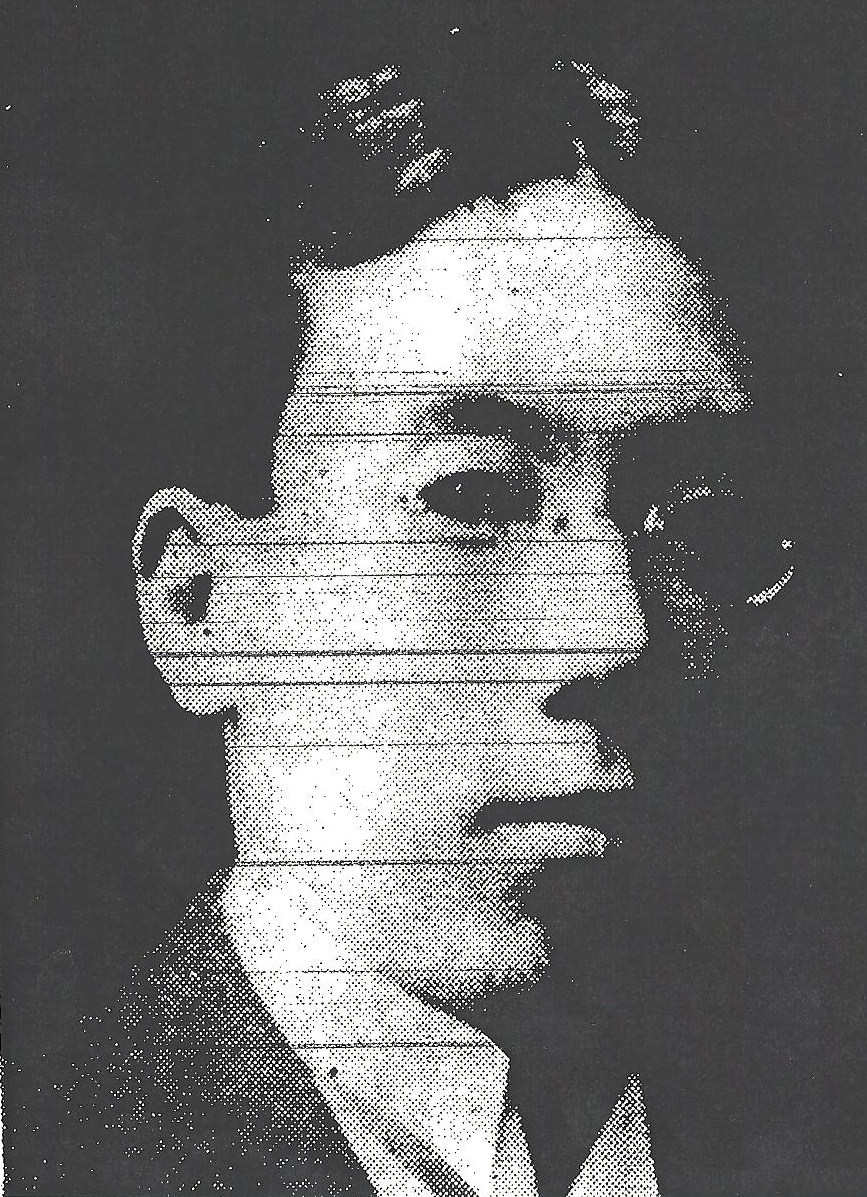
Shinpei Mykawa

Shinpei Mykawa (前川 真平, Maekawa Shinpei; December 1, 1874 in Aichi, Japan – April 24, 1906 in Erin Station, Texas) was a Japanese rice farmer who introduced the cultivation of rice in parts of southeast Texas. The community of Mykawa and Mykawa Road in Houston are named after him.

== History ==
Mykawa graduated from what would become Hitotsubashi University. At the time it was Tokyo's number one commercial college. In 1903 Mykawa first came to the United States as a naval officer representing Japan at the World's Fair in St. Louis, Missouri. While on his way to return to Japan, Mykawa passed through Houston and decided that the land around the city was perfect for rice cultivation. Mykawa settled in Erin Station, an unincorporated community in Harris County, Texas, and established a rice farm there. Mykawa, after the World's Fair, had organized a rice farming project, and returned to Texas in 1906 with four other men. Mykawa introduced rice growing in the Erin Station area.

On April 24, 1906 Mykawa died after he fell underneath one of his pieces of agricultural equipment. The Santa Fe Railroad Company renamed Erin Station to Mykawa in his honor, and Japanese immigrants to Texas perceived it as friendly towards Asian Americans because of the renaming. A school established there, Mykawa School, and Mykawa Road were named in his honor. Mykawa's name, as the town name and the name of Mykawa Road, is pronounced differently from the actual Japanese name Maekawa. The spelling of his family name was stated by a friend living in Texas as "Mykawa", and the friend had given the railroad station that name.

As of 2008 Mykawa is an area within the city of Houston.

Mykawa's grave is located in the Hollywood Cemetery in Houston. During World War II, the cemetery placed his gravestone in for safekeeping for a period after threats against the grave were telephoned.

== Gallery ==
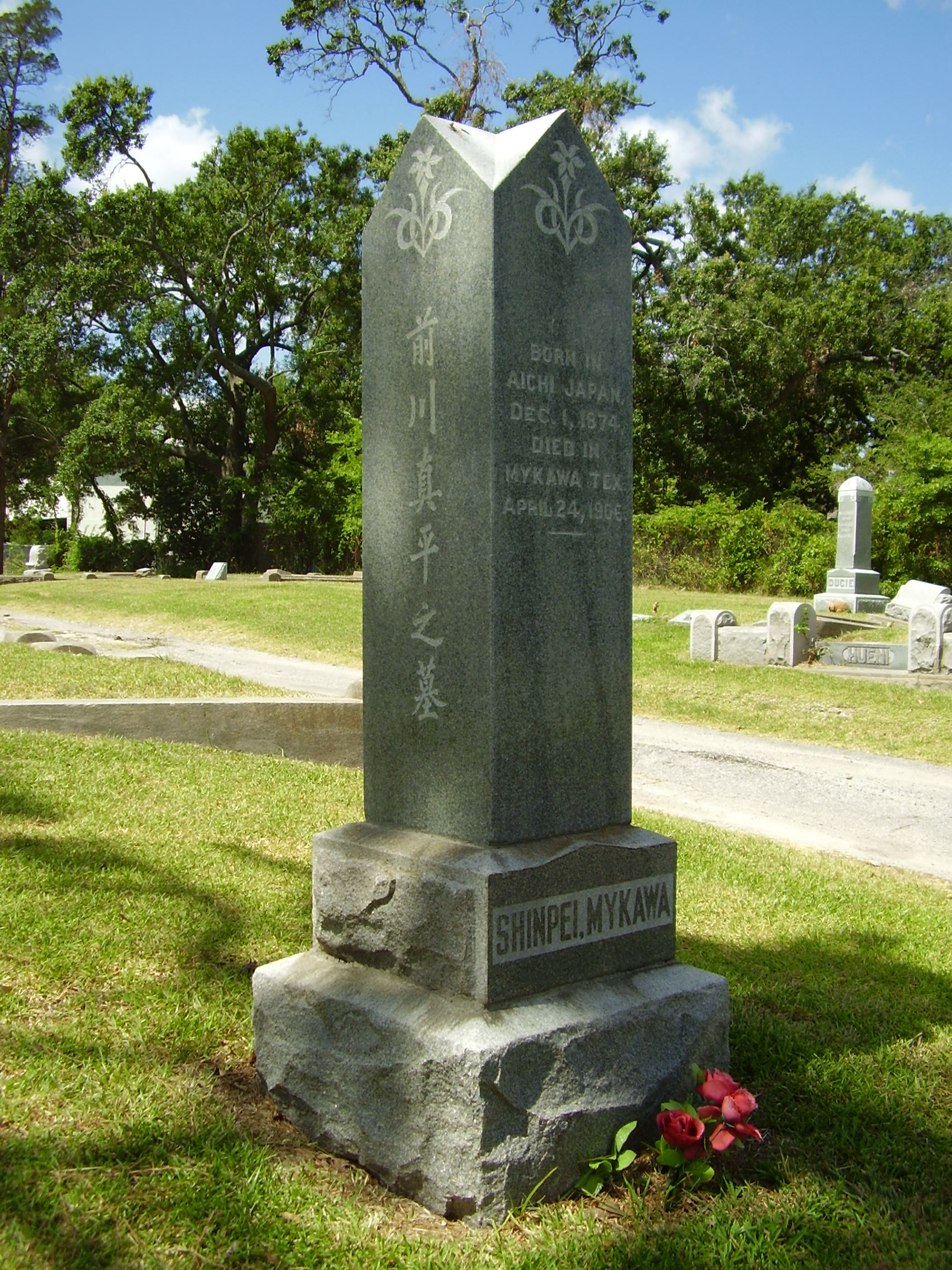
Grave of Shinpei Mykawa, Hollywood Cemetery

== See also ==
- History of the Japanese in Houston
- Kichimatsu Kishi
- Sadatsuchi Uchida
