= Kiyoaki Saibara =

Japanese farmer (1884–1972)

Kiyoaki Saibara (1884–1972) and his father Seito Saibara are credited with much of the success of the Texas Gulf Coast rice crop. Saibara was born in Kōchi Prefecture, in Japan. At the age of eighteen, he came to Webster, Texas on his father's orders to help begin a rice crop. Saibara was the first Japanese person to gain United States citizenship in Texas. He and his first wife Shimoyo had six children.

A historical marker was erected in Webster in honour of Seito and Kiyoaki.

== See also ==
- History of the Galveston Bay Area
- Webster, Texas
