= Seito Saibara =

Japanese politician (1861–1939)

- 西原 清東
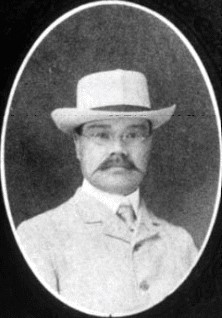
- Saibara in 1906

Member of the House of Representatives
- In office 10 August 1898 – 9 August 1902
- Preceded by: Kenkichi Kataoka
- Succeeded by: Constituency abolished
- Constituency: Kōchi 2nd

Personal details
- Born: 11 October 1861 Takaoka, Kōchi, Japan
- Died: 11 April 1939 (aged 77) Webster, Texas, U.S.
- Party: Liberal
- Education: Shigematsu Law School

Seito Saibara (西原 清東, Saibara Seitō; October 11, 1861 – April 11, 1939) was a Japanese parliament member, politician, administrator, colonist, and farmer. Apart from his missionary activities, he is credited with having first established the rice industry on the Gulf Coast of the United States.

== Early life ==
Born in 1861 in Kōchi Prefecture, Japan, Seito Saibara was the first Christian member of the Japanese Diet at a time when there was strong opposition to Christianity in Japan. Later Saibara would be asked to relinquish his seat in the parliament to become president of Doshisha University in Kyoto, Japan.

== Rice farming ==
In 1901 Saibara came to Hartford, Connecticut to study at Hartford Theological Seminary. He was then encouraged by Japanese Consul General Sadatsuchi Uchida, the Houston Chamber of Commerce and the Southern Pacific Railroad to travel to Texas to teach rice production to local farmers. In 1903 Saibara moved to Texas where he began the first Japanese-Christian colony in the state. His extended family (including his parents Hide and Masuya, and his son Kiyoaki) and 30 other colonists joined him in Webster, Texas to begin rice farming on a 1,000-acre (4.0 km^{2}) lease that Saibara later bought.

The first crop, grown from seed imported as a gift from the Emperor of Japan and harvested in 1904, was primarily distributed as seed in Texas and Louisiana. At that time, the average rice yield using seed from Honduras or the Carolinas was 18-20 barrels an acre while the Japanese seeds yielded 34 barrels (5.4 m^{3}) per acre. Seito and Kiyoaki Saibara are credited with building the multimillion-dollar Texas rice industry with their improved rice strains and production techniques.

== Later life and death ==
Saibara left Texas with his wife and spent fifteen years in South America, where he established colonies along the Amazon River, before returning to Japan. Ill health caused him to return to Texas in 1937. He died, still a Japanese citizen, in Webster on April 11, 1939, and was buried at the Fairview Cemetery. The rice farm was carried out by Kiyoaki and his sons Robert, Warren, Harvey and Eddie Saibara. Seito Saibara would later be declared one of the 100 Tallest Texans by the Houston Chronicle newspaper.

== See also ==
- History of the Galveston Bay Area
- History of the Japanese in Houston
- Webster, Texas
