= Naoko Shibusawa =

American academic

Naoko Shibusawa is an Associate Professor of History and an Associate Professor of American Studies at Brown University.

== Biography ==
Shibusawa was born in Japan in 1964. She moved to the United States in her youth, growing up in New York, Texas and California. She received a B.A. in History from U.C. Berkeley in 1987. She received a Northwestern University Graduate Fellowship in 1989, completing an M.A. in History from Northwestern University in 1993. During the pursuit of a Ph.D at Northwestern, Shibusawa received the Center for International and Comparative Studies Graduate Grant and a fellowship from Chicago chapter of the National Association of Japan-America Societies. She received a Ph.D. in History from Northwestern in 1998, with a major focus in American history in the 20th century and a minor focus in Modern Japan from 1850 to the present.

After completing her Ph.D., Shibusawa received a position as an assistant professor of history at the University of Hawaii at Manoa in 2000. Shibusawa left Hawaii for Brown University in 2004, starting as an assistant professor of history. Shibusawa was promoted to an associate professor of history in 2008. Shibusawa has received the Andrew W. Mellon Fellowship in 2004 and the Andrew W. Mellon Career Enhancement Fellowship in 2007. Shibusawa currently teaches courses at Brown about 20th century U.S. history, Cold War cultural history and foreign relations of the United States.

In addition to her academic appointments, Shibusawa is currently affiliated with the American Historical Association, the Organization of American Historians, the Society for Historians of American Foreign Relations, the American Studies Association and the Association for Asian American Studies.

== Academic work ==
Shibusawa identifies as a 20th-century U.S. cultural historian and studies U.S. imperialism and political culture. She is primarily interested in how ideas and ideologies undergird U.S. empire and foreign policy.

In 2006, Shibusawa authored the book America's Geisha Ally: Race, Gender, and Maturity in Re-Imagining the Japanese Enemy, which received the Northeast Popular/American Culture Association Peter C. Collins award for best book that same year. This book explores American depictions of Japan through mass media during World War II.

In 2015, Shibusawa coauthored the book Gender, Imperialism and Global Exchanges.

Additionally, Shibusawa has published multiple articles in the Journal of Asian American Studies, The American Historical Review, the Journal of Colonialism and Colonial History and has reviewed articles in the Pacific Historical Review, the Journal of American History, and the Journal of World History.

Shibusawa is currently working on a book called Seduced by the East: The Treason Trial of John David Provoo. This forthcoming book is expected to be published by the University of North Carolina Press.

== Selected publications ==
- Femininity, Race and Treachery: How 'Tokyo Rose' Became a Traitor to the United States after the Second World War (2010)
- America's Geisha Ally: Re-Imagining the Japanese Enemy (2006)
- The Artist Belongs to the People': The Odyssey of Taro Yashima (2005)
