= Sadatsuchi Uchida =

Japanese diplomat (1865–1942)

Sadatsuchi Uchida (内田 定槌, Uchida Sadatsuchi; born in February 12, 1865 in modern-day Kokura, Fukuoka Prefecture – June 2, 1942) was a Japanese diplomat. Assigned to postings in the United States and Brazil, Uchida was instrumental in facilitating improved Japanese trade relations and emigration to both countries. Uchida also served as the first consul in Korea.

== Early life and diplomatic career ==
A law graduate of the Tokyo Imperial University, Uchida joined the Japanese Ministry of Foreign Affairs in 1889. He was appointed as an Eleve-Consul to Shanghai in 1890, Consul to Seoul in 1893 and in 1902 was reassigned to serve as Consul General in New York City.

=== Rice cultivation in Southeast Texas ===
In 1902, Uchida toured the Gulf Coast region of the United States. At the time, overpopulation and the limited usable land for farming was affecting Japan. In the United States, rice farming was still in its infancy, and local rice production was falling short of its full potential. Consul General Uchida met with officials from the Texas Governor’s office, business owners in Houston, and other community leaders who gave him confidence that the Japanese would be welcomed into the region. Uchida was impressed with the land of the Gulf Coast of Southeast Texas for its rice farming potential.

Uchida's reports back to Japan of the agricultural conditions in Southeast Texas led to the migration of a number of Japanese businessmen and the development of rice cultivation in that region. Some of the better known of these migrants included Seito Saibara, who established a Japanese community near Webster, and Kichimatsu Kishi who would establish a colony in Orange County, Texas.

=== Advocacy for Japanese emigration to Brazil ===
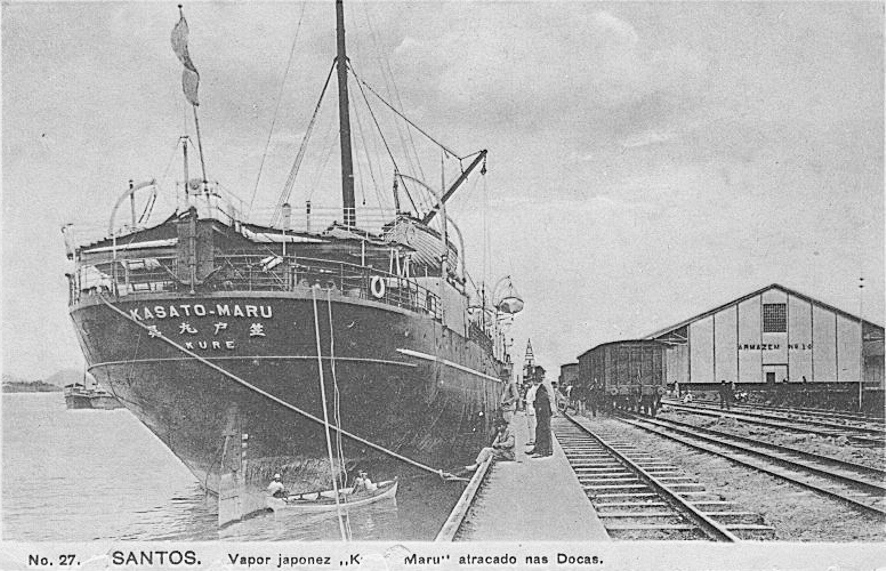
Kasato Maru, a Japanese ship which brought the first 791 immigrants from Japan to Brazil. Here shown moored at the port of Santos, São Paulo, in 1908.

As emigration controls to the United States and Canada were gradually introduced, Uchida, in his new role as Japanese Minister Plenipotentiary in Brazil, successfully lobbied for an expansion of Japanese migration to that country. In 1907, on Uchida's recommendation, the Brazilian and the Japanese governments signed a treaty facilitating Japanese migration. The first Japanese immigrants, 165 families, a total of 786 people, arrived in Brazil on 2 June 1908 on the Kasato Maru. Mostly farming families destined to work in the coffee plantations, they had travelled from the Japanese port of Kobe via the Cape of Good Hope.

=== Late career ===
Uchida also served in senior diplomatic posts as envoy to Sweden during the First World War and as High Commissioner to the Ottoman Empire.

== Family home ==
Uchida's two story Shibuya, Tokyo home designed in 1910 by American architect James McDonald Gardiner, is preserved as a landmark feature of the Italian Garden Park in Yamate, Yokohama.

== Awards and recognition ==
Uchida received an honorary Doctorate degree from Rutgers University in 1905.
