= Maekawa =

Maekawa (written: 前川) is a Japanese surname. Notable people with the surname include:

- Atsushi Maekawa (前川 淳; born 1964), Japanese anime and tokusatsu scriptwriter
- Ayaka Maekawa (前川 綾香; born 1983), Japanese tennis player
- Daiya Maekawa (前川 黛也; born 1994), Japanese footballer
- Hachiro Maekawa (前川 八郎; 1912–2010), Japanese baseball player
- Haruo Maekawa (前川 春雄; 1911–1989), Japanese businessman and central banker
- Jun Maekawa (前川 淳; born 1958), Japanese software engineer, mathematician, origami artist
- Kazuhiko Maekawa (前川 和彦; born 1947), Japanese doctor, responsible for the care of two victims from the 1999 Tokaimura nuclear accident
- Kazuya Maekawa (前川 和也; born 1968), Japanese footballer
- Kenkichi Maekawa (前川 健吉; born 1953), Japanese sport wrestler
- Kisaku Mayekawa (前川 喜作; 1893–1986), Japanese industrialist and philanthropist
- Kiyoshi Maekawa (前川 清; born 1948), Japanese singer and tarento
- Kiyoshige Maekawa (前川 清成; born 1962), Japanese politician
- Kunio Maekawa (前川 國男; 1905–1986), Japanese architect
- Miyuki Maekawa (前川 みゆき; born 1956), Japanese fencer
- Ryoko Maekawa (前川 涼子), Japanese voice actress
- Sadamichi Maekawa (前川 禎通; born 1946), Japanese researcher
- Senpan Maekawa (前川 千帆; 1888–1960), Japanese woodblock printer
- Shinpei Mykawa (前川 真平; 1874–1906), Japanese rice farmer and namesake of Mykawa, Texas
- Steven Maekawa (born 1967), American prelate and Dominican friar of the Catholic Church
- Taiga Maekawa (前川 大河; born 1996), Japanese footballer
- Yasuo Maekawa (前川 康男; 1921–2003), Japanese writer
- Yasuyuki Maekawa (前川 泰之; born 1973), Japanese actor and former model
- Yoko Maekawa (前川 陽子; born 1950), Japanese singer

== Fictional characters ==
- Ai Maekawa (前川 藍), protagonist of the manga series Doubt!!
- Akio Maekawa (前川 彰男), a character in the visual novel Ayakashi
- Miku Maekawa (前川 みく), a character in the video game The Idolmaster Cinderella Girls
- Tamaki Maekawa (前川 たまき), a character in the manga series Ultimate Muscle

== See also ==
- Maekawa's algorithm
