= Webster, Texas =

- City
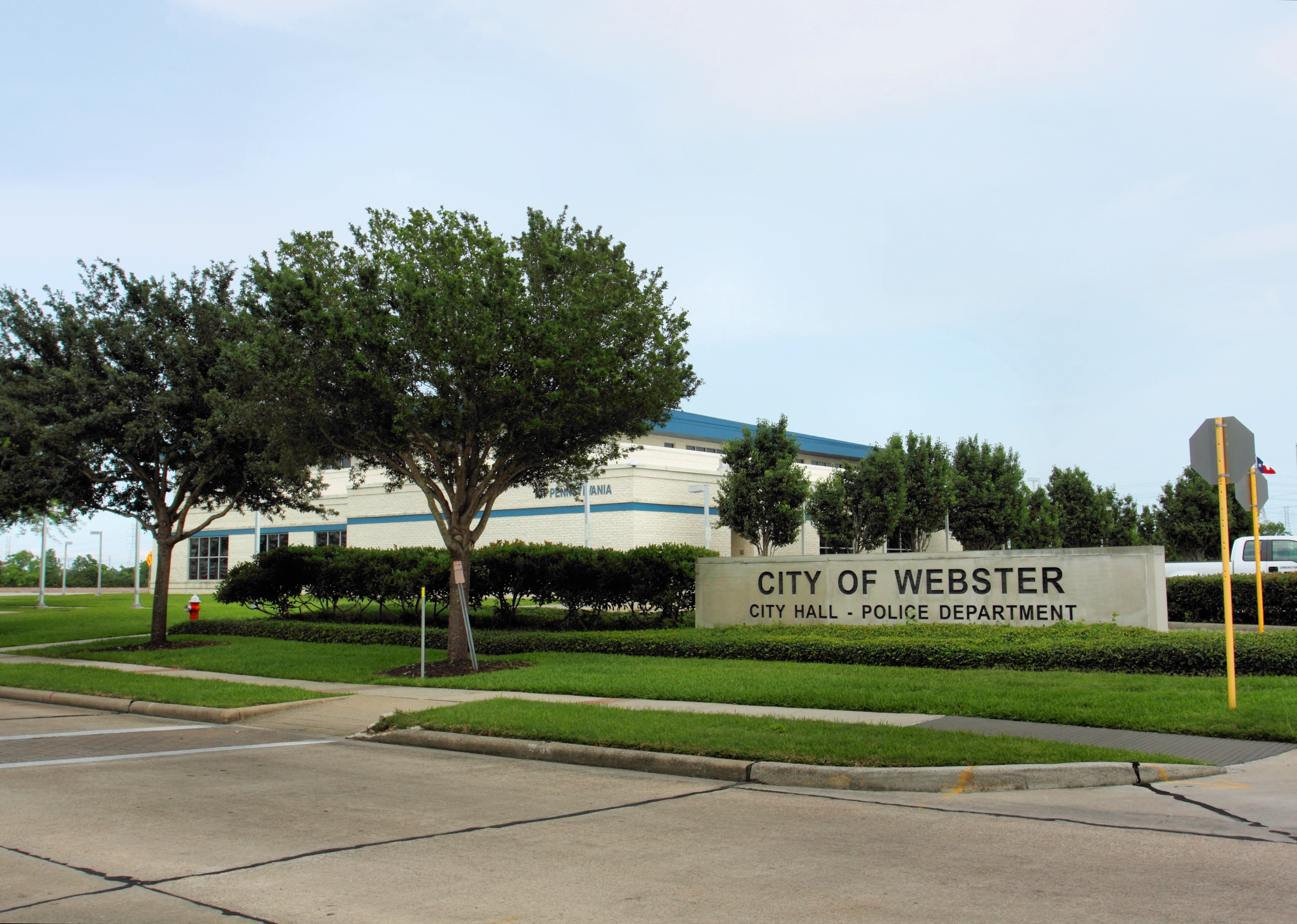
- Webster City Hall and Police Department

- Flag

- Location in Harris County and the state of Texas
- Coordinates: 29°32′15″N 95°7′5″W
- Country: United States
- State: Texas
- County: Harris

Area
  - Total: 6.62 sq mi (17.15 km^{2})
  - Land: 6.39 sq mi (16.56 km^{2})
  - Water: 0.23 sq mi (0.59 km^{2})
- Elevation: 23 ft (7.0 m)

Population (2020)
  - Total: 12,499
  - Density: 1,791.3/sq mi (691.64/km^{2})
- Time zone: UTC-6 (Central (CST))
  - Summer (DST): UTC-5 (CDT)
- ZIP Code: 77598
- Area code: 281
- FIPS code: 48-76948
- GNIS feature ID: 1349594
- Website: www.webstertx.gov

Webster is a city in the U.S. state of Texas located in Harris County, within the Houston–Pasadena–The Woodlands metropolitan area. Its population was 12,499 at the 2020 U.S. census.

== History ==
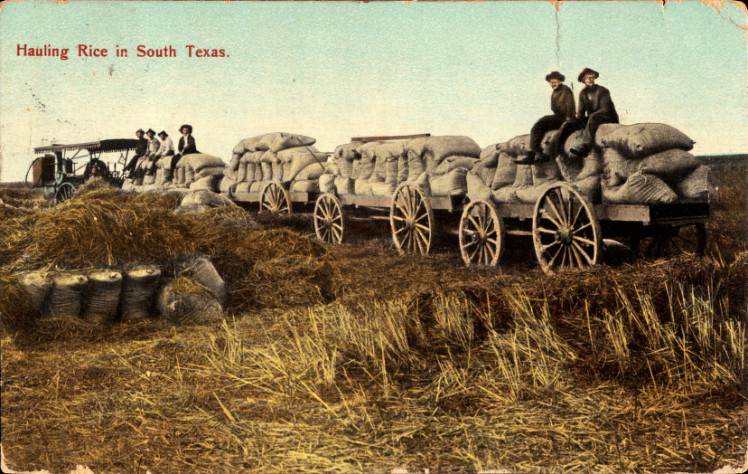
Hauling rice in South Texas (postcard, c. 1909)

The community was founded in 1879 by James W. Webster under the name "Gardentown". It was established initially as a colony for settlers from England. It began as a stopover for travelers between Houston/Harrisburg, Galveston, Kemah, and Seabrook. Eventually, railroads, such as the Missouri, Kansas and Texas Railway, were built through the area. Farmers in the area raised pears and other produce.

In 1903, the Houston Chamber of Commerce invited Seito Saibara, a former Japanese member of parliament and a Christian theologian, to come to Texas to teach rice farming. Rice at that time was emerging as an important cash crop. Saibara settled in Webster and established a small farming community of Japanese Christians. Saibara and his son Kiyoaki established the foundations of what became the rice industry of the U.S. Gulf Coast.

Dairies and livestock ranches developed in the town, as well, in the early 1900s. Petroleum was discovered at the Webster (Friendswood) Oil Field in 1937, but the population remained small. The community was incorporated in 1958.

In 1961, the National Aeronautics and Space Administration announced that it was building the Manned Spacecraft Center (now known as the Johnson Space Center) nearby along the shores of Clear Lake. Growth and development quickly swept over the Clear Lake area, and Webster's population blossomed. Webster today has become a thriving bedroom community closely tied to the Clear Lake area and its high-tech industry.

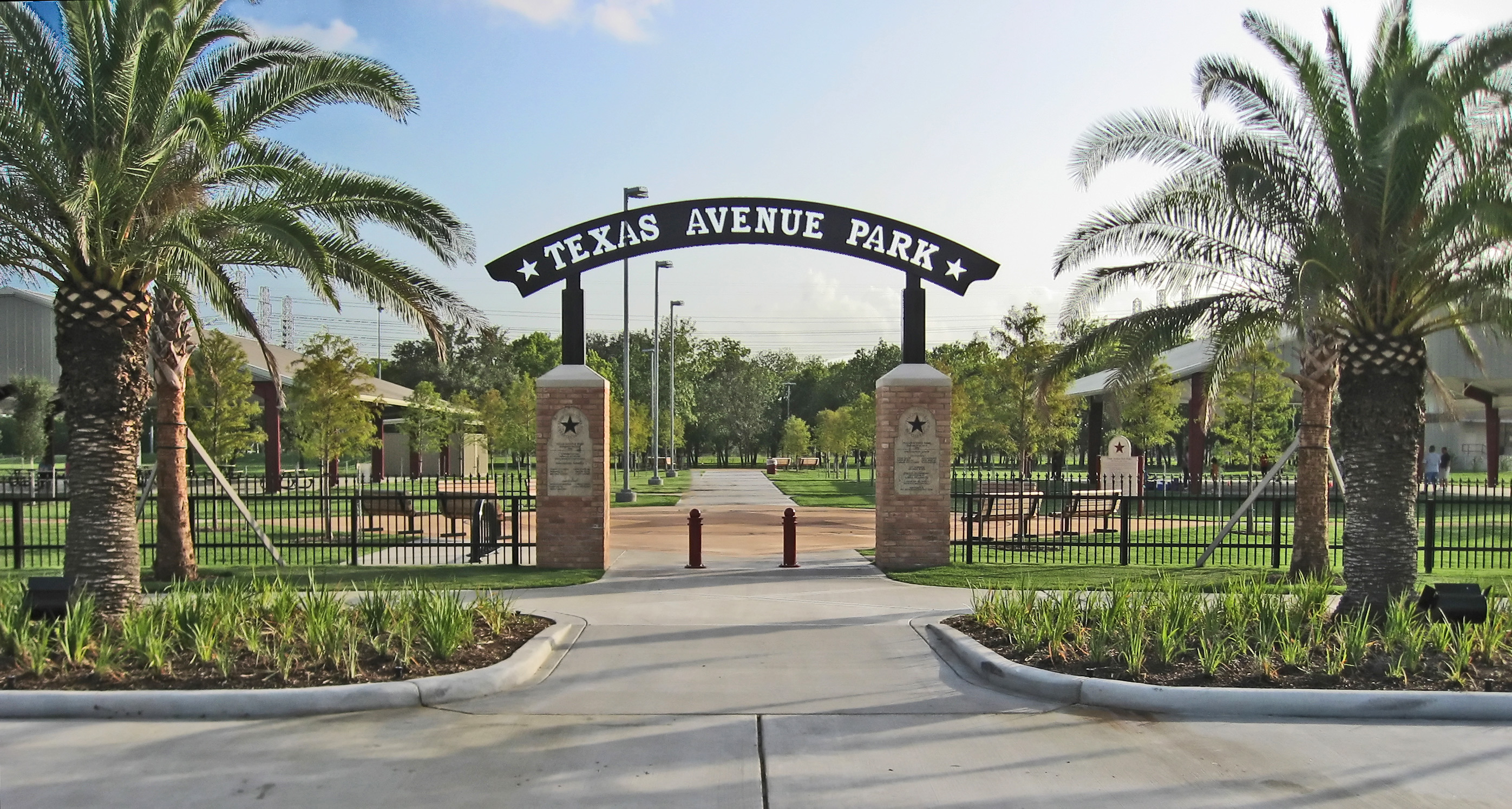
A popular park in Webster

== Geography ==
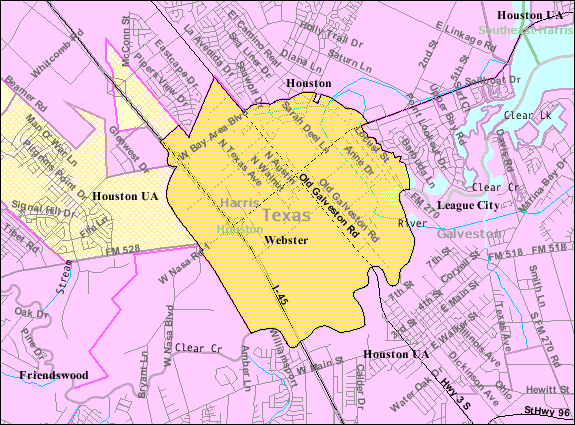
Map of Webster

Webster is located in southeastern Harris County at 29°32′15″N 95°7′5″W. It is bordered to the north by the city of Houston and to the northeast by Nassau Bay. Clear Creek forms the southeastern border of Webster and is the Harris County / Galveston County line. League City borders Webster to the south and southwest, in both counties.

Interstate 45 runs through the western side of Webster, with access from exits 23 through 25. Downtown Houston is 22 miles (35 km) to the northwest, and Galveston is 28 miles (45 km) to the southeast.

According to the United States Census Bureau, the city has a total area of 6.6 square miles (17.0 km^{2}), of which 0.23 square miles (0.6 km^{2}), or 3.24%, is covered by water.

=== Climate ===
The climate in this area is characterized by hot, humid summers and generally mild to cool winters. According to the Köppen climate classification, Webster has a humid subtropical climate, Cfa on climate maps.

Climate data for Webster, Texas
Month	Jan	Feb	Mar	Apr	May	Jun	Jul	Aug	Sep	Oct	Nov	Dec	Year
Average precipitation inches	4.60	3.07	3.55	5.50	5.44	5.65	4.91	6.51	6.38	6.10	4.58	4.38	60.67
Average precipitation mm	117	78	90	140	138	144	125	165	162	155	116	111	1,541
Source: https://www.ncei.noaa.gov/access/us-climate-normals/#dataset=normals-annualseasonal&timeframe=30&station=US1TXHRR028

== Demographics ==
Historical population
Census	Pop.	Note	%±
1960	329		—
1970	2,231		578.1%
1980	2,405		7.8%
1990	4,678		94.5%
2000	9,083		94.2%
2010	10,684		17.6%
2020	12,499		17.0%
U.S. Decennial Census

=== Racial and ethnic composition ===
Webster city, Texas – Racial and ethnic composition Note: the US Census treats Hispanic/Latino as an ethnic category. This table excludes Latinos from the racial categories and assigns them to a separate category. Hispanics/Latinos may be of any race.
Race / Ethnicity (NH = Non-Hispanic)	Pop 2000	Pop 2010	Pop 2020	% 2000	% 2010	% 2020
White alone (NH)	5,046	4,762	4,997	55.55%	45.79%	39.98%
Black or African American alone (NH)	803	1,366	1,937	8.84%	13.13%	15.50%
Native American or Alaska Native alone (NH)	30	35	35	0.33%	0.34%	0.28%
Asian alone (NH)	517	466	893	5.69%	4.48%	7.14%
Native Hawaiian or Pacific Islander alone (NH)	14	6	5	0.15%	0.06%	0.04%
Other race alone (NH)	13	36	86	0.14%	0.35%	0.69%
Mixed race or Multiracial (NH)	186	188	452	2.05%	1.81%	3.62%
Hispanic or Latino (any race)	2,474	3,541	4,094	27.24%	34.05%	32.75%
Total	9,083	10,400	12,499	100.00%	100.00%	100.00%

=== 2020 census ===
As of the 2020 census, Webster had a population of 12,499 and 2,530 families residing in the city. The median age was 31.8 years. 21.3% of residents were under the age of 18 and 11.0% of residents were 65 years of age or older. For every 100 females there were 99.0 males, and for every 100 females age 18 and over there were 97.8 males age 18 and over.

The 2020 census determined 100.0% of residents lived in urban areas, while 0.0% lived in rural areas.

There were 5,701 households in Webster, of which 27.4% had children under the age of 18 living in them. Of all households, 27.1% were married-couple households, 29.7% were households with a male householder and no spouse or partner present, and 34.5% were households with a female householder and no spouse or partner present. About 42.0% of all households were made up of individuals and 10.2% had someone living alone who was 65 years of age or older.

There were 6,381 housing units, of which 10.7% were vacant. The homeowner vacancy rate was 3.3% and the rental vacancy rate was 10.5%.

Racial composition as of the 2020 census
Race	Number	Percent
White	5,948	47.6%
Black or African American	2,022	16.2%
American Indian and Alaska Native	130	1.0%
Asian	909	7.3%
Native Hawaiian and Other Pacific Islander	5	0.0%
Some other race	1,618	12.9%
Two or more races	1,867	14.9%
Hispanic or Latino (of any race)	4,094	32.8%

=== 2019 American Community Survey ===
The 2019 American Community Survey determined 11,451 people lived within the city limits. The racial and ethnic makeup of the city was 70.6% non-Hispanic white, 19.4% Black or African American, 0.1% American Indian or Alaska Native, 4.2% Asian, 3.7% multiracial, and 33.1% Hispanic or Latin American of any race.

In 2019, the 4,994 households had an owner-occupied housing rate of 13.1%, and the median value of an owner-occupied housing unit was $186,400. Webster had a median gross rent of $1,131 from 2015–2019. The city of Webster had a median household income of $55,497 and per capita income of $29,242. Roughly 18.7% of persons lived at or below the poverty line according to the 2019 survey.

=== 2000 census ===
At the census of 2000, 9,083 people, 4,114 households, and 1,970 families were residing in the city. The population density was 1,372.9 inhabitants per square mile (530.1/km^{2}). The 4,733 housing units had an average density of 715.4/sq mi (276.0/km^{2}). The racial makeup of the city was 64.85% White, 9.03% African American, 0.55% Native American, 5.72% Asian, 0.15% Pacific Islander, 15.78% from other races, and 3.92% from two or more races. Hispanics or Latinos of any race were 27.24% of the population.

Of the 4,114 households, 24.6% had children under 18 living with them, 32.7% were married couples living together, 10.1% had a female householder with no husband present, and 52.1% were not families. About 40.6% of all households were made up of individuals, and 2.1% had someone living alone who was 65 or older. The average household size was 2.14, and the average family size was 2.97.

In the city, the age distribution was 20.9% under 18, 15.0% from 18 to 24, 43.5% from 25 to 44, 15.4% from 45 to 64, and 5.1% who were 65 or older. The median age was 29 years. For every 100 females, there were 109.3 males. For every 100 females 18 and over, there were 107.3 males.

The median income for a household in the city was $42,385, and for a family was $43,495. Males had a median income of $35,346 versus $29,808 for females. The per capita income for the city was $21,964. About 12.5% of families and 13.2% of the population were below the poverty line, including 19.2% of those under 18 and 5.6% of those 65 or over.

== Government and infrastructure ==
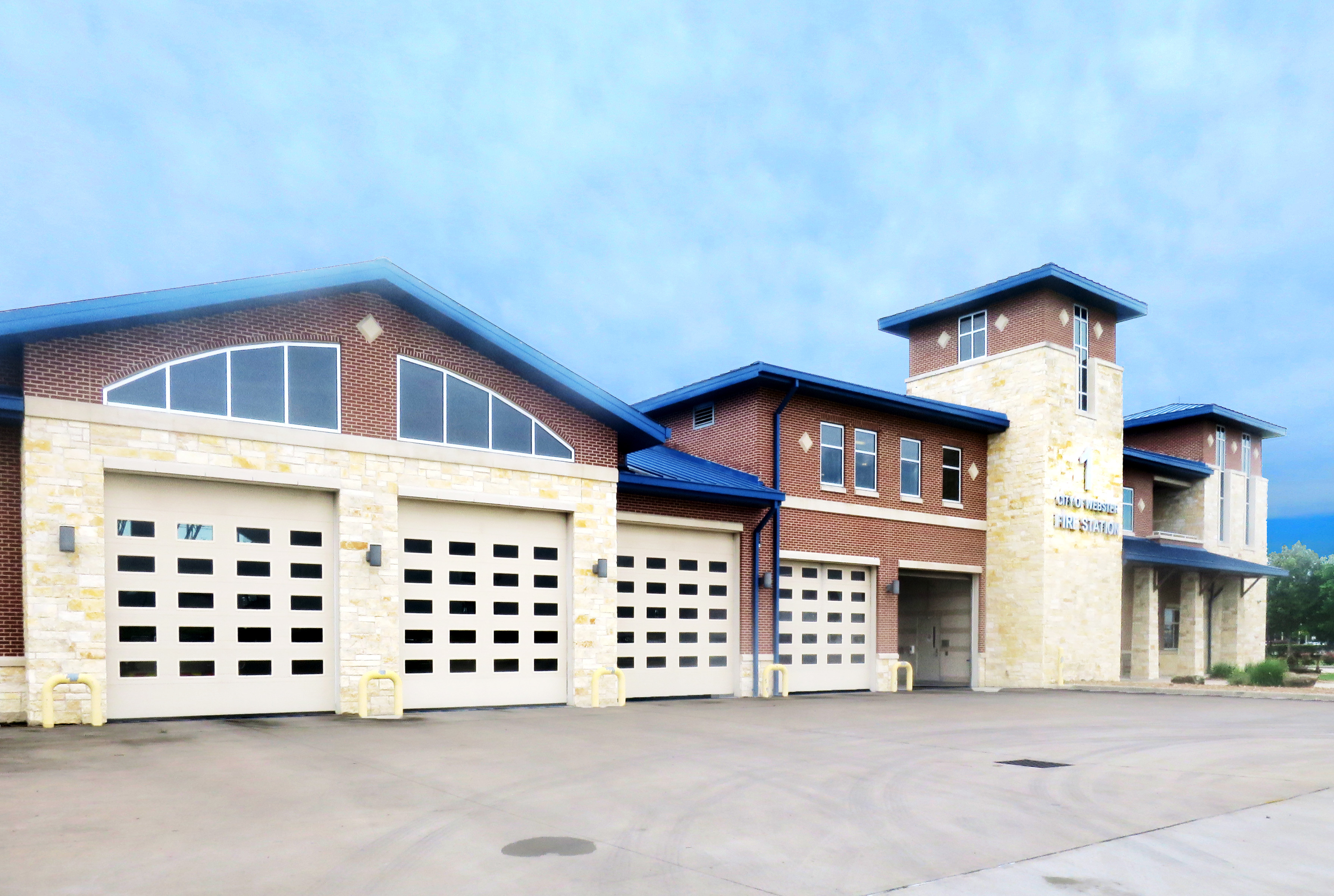
Webster Fire Station on Texas 3

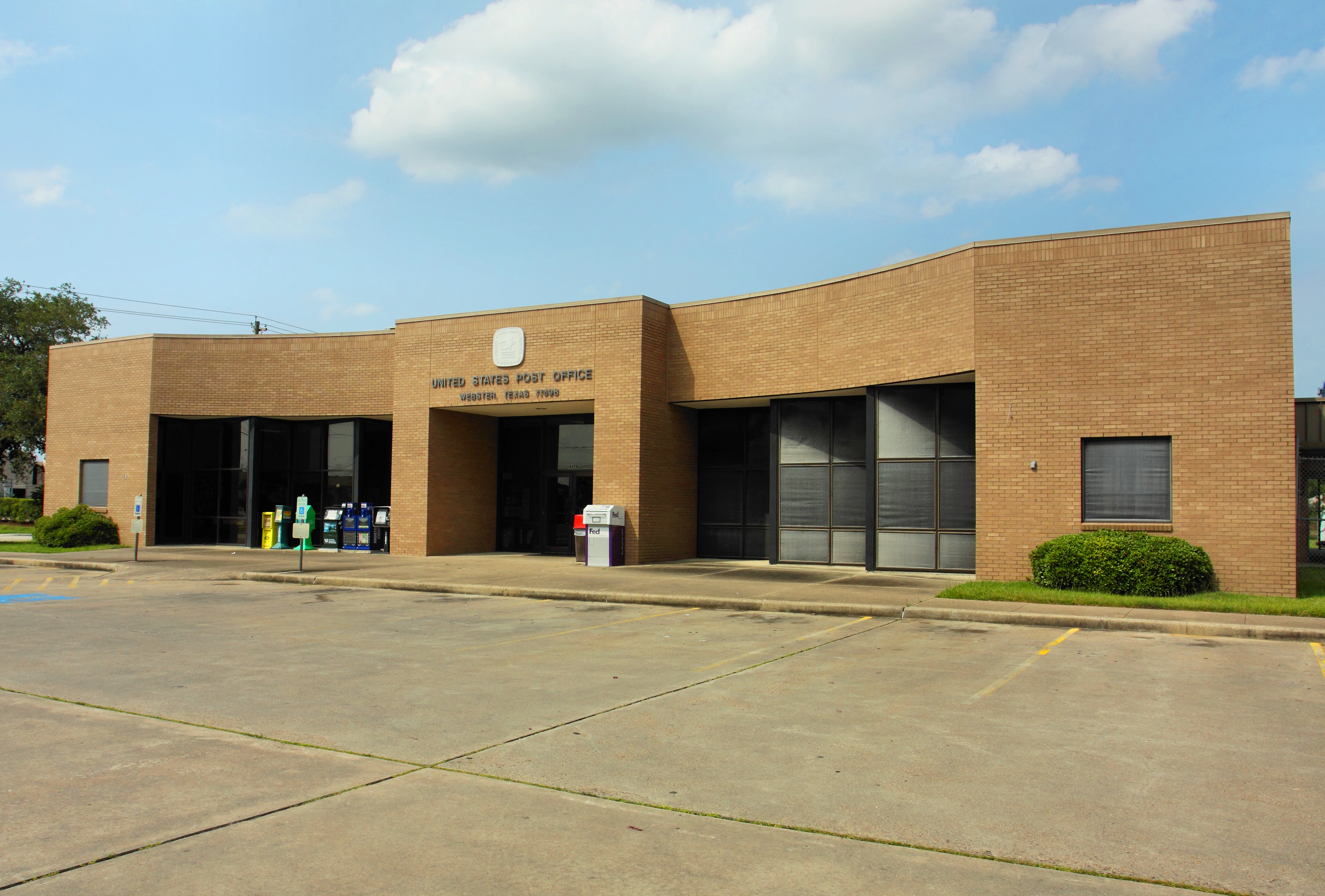
Webster Post Office

The city of Webster has fire stations #1 and #2, with the fire department offices in the second station. The city has its own police department.

Harris County Housing Authority operates Baybrook Park, a public-housing complex for seniors, in the Webster city limits. It has 100 units.

The Texas Department of Public Safety operates its Webster Field Investigator Office and Driver's License Office in a nearby area in Houston.

The Texas Department of Criminal Justice operates the Webster District Parole Office in a nearby area in Houston.

The United States Postal Service Webster Post Office is located at 17077 North Texas Avenue. Some locations in the City of Houston have Webster mailing addresses.

Harris Health System (formerly Harris County Hospital District) designated Strawberry Health Center in Pasadena for ZIP code 77598. The nearest public hospital is Ben Taub General Hospital in the Texas Medical Center.

== Economy ==
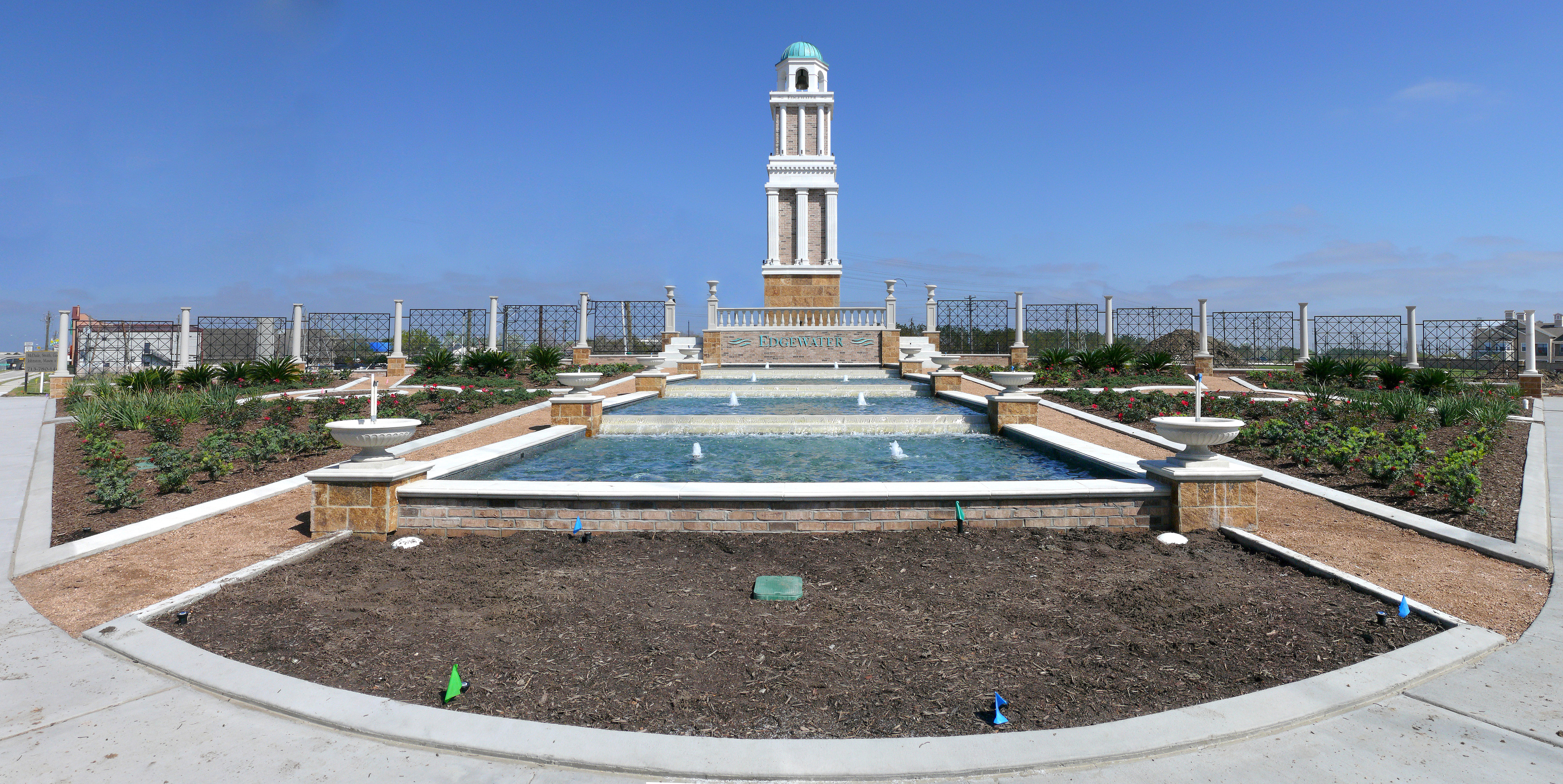
Edgewater Estates entrance Webster, Texas

The Baybrook Mall is located in the City of Houston, near Webster.

== Education ==
=== Primary and secondary schools ===
==== Public schools ====
Pupils in Webster attend schools in Clear Creek Independent School District. The community is divided between the Board of Trustees District 2 and the Board of Trustees District 4. They are represented by Win Weber and Stuart J. Stromeyer, respectively, as of 2008. CCISD was established in 1948, partly from the former Webster school district, which served up to high school and took high-school students from Kemah and Seabrook.

Most residents within the city limits are zoned to Margaret S. McWhirter Elementary School in Webster. The school occupies a 125,000-square-foot (11,600 m^{2}) building. The current McWhirter campus held its groundbreaking in 2014, and opened in 2016. The re-dedication was held in March of that year. That year the Texas Education Agency gave the school a grant allowing it to re-establish a full day Prekindergarten program.

Some residential sections of the city are served by Armand Bayou (Houston), Falcon Pass (Houston), League City (League City), and Whitcomb (Houston) elementary schools. Most residents are zoned to Clear Creek Intermediate School (League City). Some residents are zoned to Clear Lake, and Space Center intermediate schools, both in Clear Lake City and in Houston. Most residents are zoned to Clear Creek High School in League City, while Clear Lake High School in Clear Lake City, Houston, serves a small section.

P.H. Greene Elementary School, in an unincorporated area, serves areas outside of the city with Webster addresses.

===== History of schools =====
Webster Intermediate School formerly served the city, but moved to an unincorporated area near Friendswood and was renamed Westbrook Intermediate School in spring 2005; As of 2016 Westbrook does not serve Webster.

==== Private schools ====
Iman Academy Southeast Secondary School is in southeast Houston, northeast of Webster, off of Highway 3.

==== Colleges and universities ====
The portion of Clear Creek ISD in Harris County (and therefore Webster) is assigned to San Jacinto College.

== Parks and recreation ==
The Edgar A. Smith Family YMCA is located in Houston; it has a Webster mailing address.

== Notable people ==
- Stephanie Beatriz, actress
- Tyler Davis, professional baseball pitcher with the Chicago White Sox
- Josh Huestis, basketball player for the Oklahoma City Thunder
- Dennis Paul, a Republican member of the Texas House of Representatives from District 129, formerly resided in Webster.
- Steve Stockman, Republican former member of the United States House of Representatives from Texas's 36th congressional district
- Ryan Trecartin, multimedia artist

== See also ==
- Seito Saibara
