= Michael Silbermann =

Israeli maxillofacial surgeon and health educator

- מיכאל זילברמן
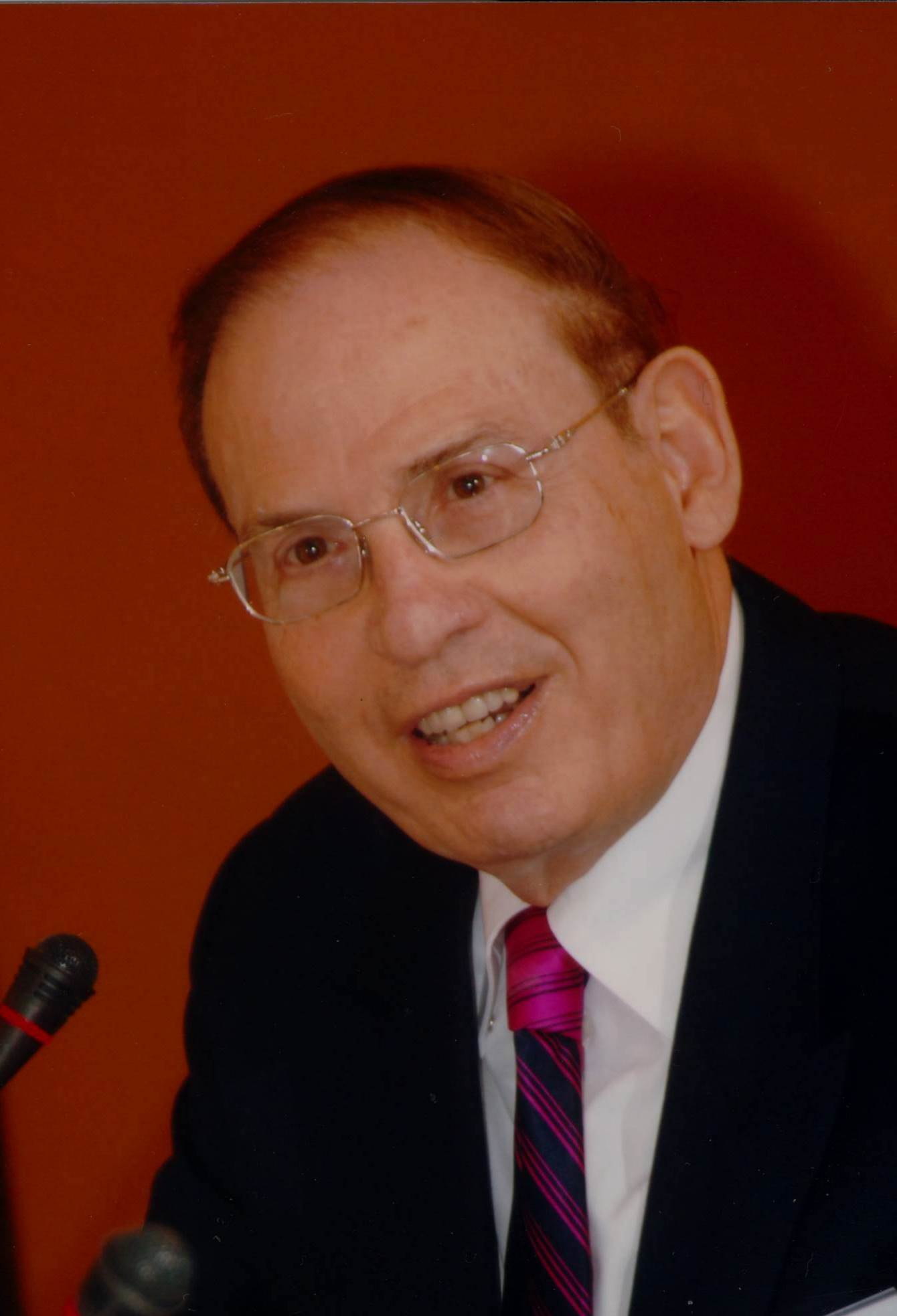
- Born: January 19, 1935 (age 91); Acre, Israel
- Citizenship: Israel
- Education: Hebrew University of Jerusalem, Tufts University
- Awards: 2015 Honorary Member Award (Oncology Nursing Society)
- Scientific career
- Fields: Oral and maxillofacial surgery
- Workplaces: Technion – Israel Institute of Technology, Israel Ministry of Health, Middle East Cancer Consortium
- Doctoral advisors: Jack Fromer and Larry Cavazos

Michael Silbermann (Hebrew: מיכאל זילברמן) is an Israeli maxillofacial surgeon and health educator. He is currently the executive director of the Middle East Cancer Consortium.

== Background ==
Silbermann was born on January 19, 1935, in the old quarters of the Arab city of Acre then part of Mandatory Palestine under British administration. His parents, Herbert and Marga-Miriam emigrated from their native Germany to Palestine in 1934.

== Career ==
Following his military service, Silbermann moved to Jerusalem to study dental medicine at the Hebrew University-Hadassah Faculty of Dental Medicine.

Following his studies in Jerusalem (1967), he moved to Boston (MA, United States) for specialty training in maxillo-facial surgery at Boston City Hospital under Philip Maloney and Chris Doku. After completing his Ph.D. at Tufts University (under Jack Fromer and Larry Cavazos), he joined a new medical school at the Technion – Israel Institute of Technology (Haifa).

After serving for 20 years as chair of the Department of Anatomy and Cell Biology in the Technion's Ruth & Bruce Rappaport Faculty of Medicine, and 10 years as director of the Laboratory for Musculoskeletal Research, he was elected dean of the Technion's Faculty of Medicine. Upon completing his tenure as dean, he was appointed Chief Scientist of the Israel Ministry of Health in Jerusalem, starting January 1993.

In 2015, Silbermann received the Honorary Member Award of the Oncology Nursing Society for his contributions to oncologic nursing.

== Middle East Cancer Consortium ==
Silbermann is the executive director of the Middle East Cancer Consortium (MECC) since 1996.

== Selected publications ==
- Silbermann, M; Slavkin, H, eds. (1982). Current Advances in Skeletogenesis. Amsterdam-Oxford-Princeton: Excerpta Medica.
- Bernes, DS; Abramsky, O; Silbermann, M, eds. (1996). Director of Medical Research in Israel. Institutions and Scientists. Jerusalem, Israel: Ministry of Health (Israel) and Laster Pages.
- Silbermann, M, ed. (2004). Palliative Care to the Cancer Patient. The Middle East as a Model for Emerging Countries. New York, NY: Nova Publishers.
