= Nursing in Japan =

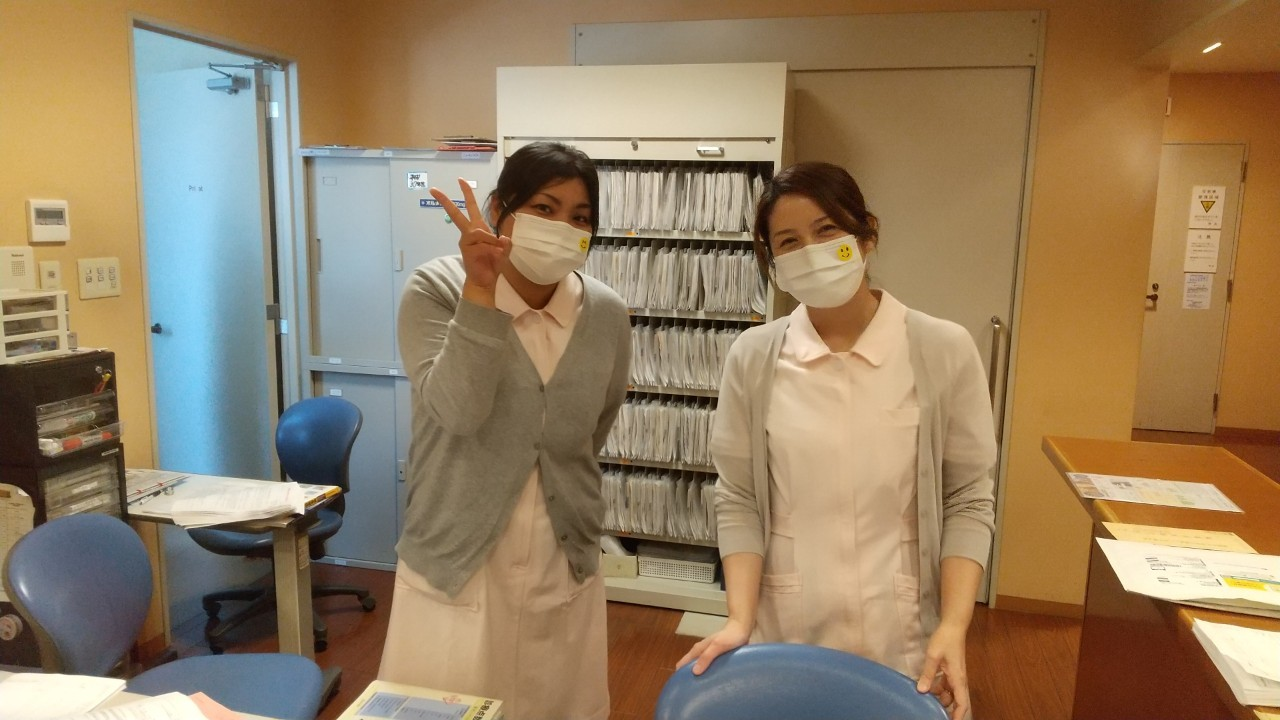
Japanese nurses

Nursing in Japan did not develop as an occupation until the end of the nineteenth century. Initially introduced only in Tokyo in the late 1860s, small schools utilizing Western models were being opened by the late 1880s. In response to disaster relief, the Japanese Red Cross became an integral part of nursing development. By 1915, nurse registration had been established and public health nurses began working throughout the country. Nursing universities were established in the twentieth century and regulations were passed to develop standards for training and public health. Presently, Japan recognizes four types of nurses: Public Health Nurses, Midwives, Registered Nurses and Assistant Nurses.

== History ==
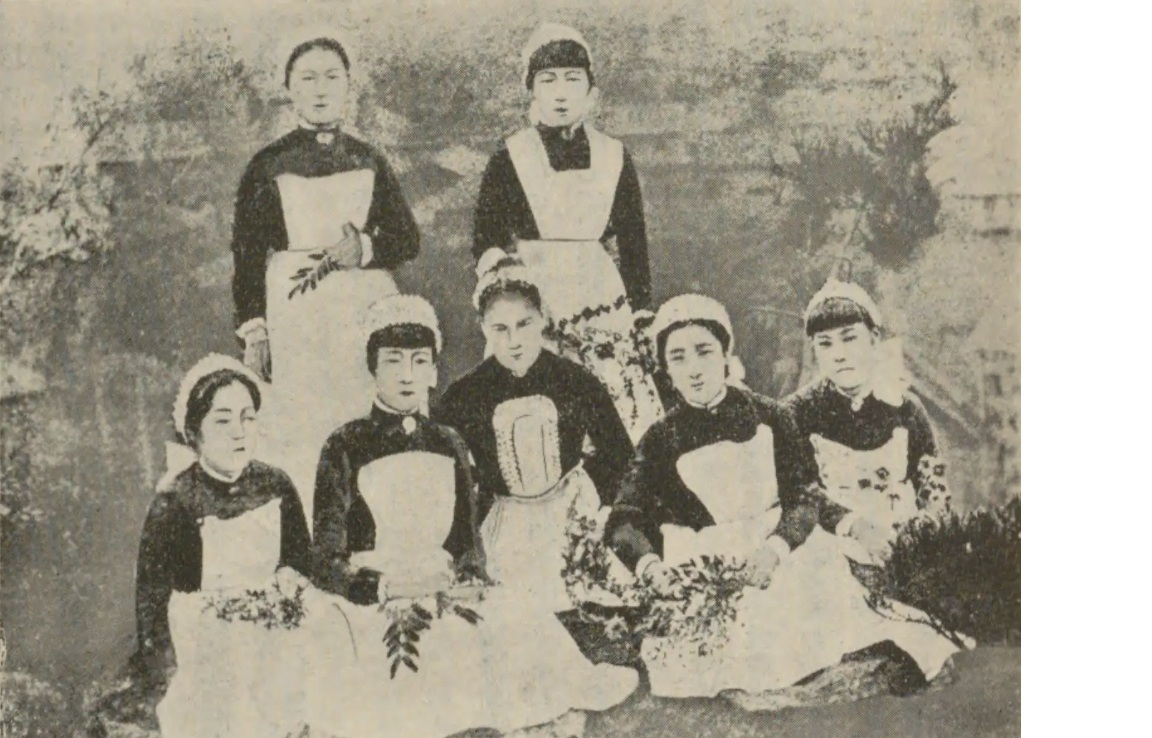
Graduating nursing students of Sakurai Girls' School, Tokyo, with their foreign instructor Agnes Vetch, 1888

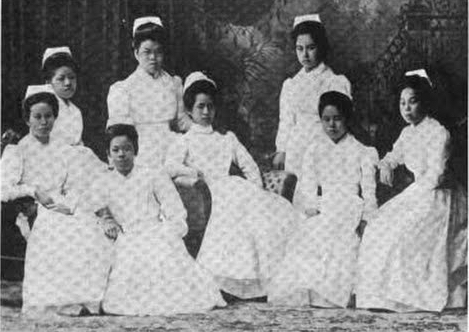
Nursing educator Iyo Araki, seated at center, and student nurses at St. Luke's International Hospital in Tokyo, from a 1909 publication

Care of the sick in Japan was primarily done in the home by untrained family members until the end of the nineteenth century. Nursing first emerged in Tokyo in 1869, when Tokyo Imperial University opened a small school for nurses. Little training was given in how to care for the sick, but students were instructed in hygiene and sanitary conditions for hospitals.

In 1883, foreign missionaries opened two small nursing schools, based on Western models to give theoretical training to nurses. Two years later, a doctor opened a school in Kyoto and the Canadian Episcopal Mission began a school in Kobe. The Kyoto school was begun by Linda Richards, who was sent by the American Board of Missions to organize a training school at the Doshisha Hospital. The first class of four nurses graduated in 1888.

In 1887, the Japanese Red Cross (JRC) was founded and by 1890 had begun teaching and recruiting nurses for training. Though their nurses were still studying when the Sino Japanese War broke out, the JRC decided to send trainees to help with relief efforts. From 1894, JRC Nurses served in numerous conflicts helping with the wounded, including in the Boxer Rebellion (1900), the Russo-Japanese War (1904), World War I and the Japanese intervention in Siberia (1919). The JRC Nurses' training program required three years of study with the first year dedicated to theory, including courses on anatomy, bandaging, disinfection, hygiene, instruments, women's health, obstetrics, as well as basic assistance of surgery and health treatment and the latter two years involved in practical training. Completion of the course required a final examination before diplomas were given and additional six months of training could qualify nurse candidates as head nurses. Because the JRC was under government control, their hospitals spread to all the major cities and a uniformity of training made the organization a leader in nursing development.

Nursing was not an established part of Japan's health care system until 1899 with the adoption of the Midwives Ordinance. The Registered Nurse Ordinance was passed in 1915 which established a legal substantiation to registered nurses all over Japan. In the 1920s, the government began investigating the need to increase the educational requirements for nurses. Up to that time, job training was the only requirement and there was no prerequisite for a high school education to enter training at most hospitals. In 1927, St. Luke's International Hospital became the first college of nursing in the country and based its training program on the one offered at Yale University in New Haven, Connecticut. The program required students to be graduates of a Government High School, complete three years of standard training, and a fourth year of specialization.

The first nursing association in Japan was founded in 1929 by Take Hagiwara as the Nursing Association of the Japanese Empire. By 1933, the organization had around 1500 members from throughout Japan and joined the International Council of Nurses (ICN). During World War II the Public Health Nurse Ordinance (1941) and National Medical Care Act (1942) were passed and re-affirmed in 1948 with passage of the Public Health Nurses, Midwives and Nurses Act. It established educational requirements, standards and licensure. In 1946, the Japanese Nursing Association was created, merging the Japanese Midwife Society, Japanese Public Health Nurses Association and the Nursing Association of the Japanese Empire into one umbrella organization.

There has been a continued effort to improve nursing in Japan. In 1952 the first university courses on nursing were introduced, 1957 requirements for assistant nurses were introduced, in 1965 regulations were passed for nurses working night-shifts, and throughout the 1990s several legislative acts expanded training and employment protections for nurses. In 1992, the Law for Securing Nursing Personnel created new university programs to address the aging population of Japan, establish a critical scientifically based approach to training rather than a pragmatic one, unify training and licensing requirements and overall improve the image of the field. In 2009, the Public Health Nurses, Midwives and Nurses Act was amended allowing those who had graduated from a 4-year college to be eligible to take the nursing examination, revising course requirements, and making newly graduated training mandatory for nursing personnel.

== Types ==
Japan recognizes four types of nurses: Public Health Nurses, Midwives, Registered Nurses and Assistant Nurses.

Public health nursing is designed to help the public and is also driven by the public's needs. The goals of public health nurses are to monitor the spread of disease, keep vigilant watch for environmental hazards, educate the community on how to care for and treat themselves, and train for community disasters.

Midwife nurses are independent of any organization. A midwife takes care of a pregnant woman during labor and postpartum. They assist the mother with breastfeeding, caring for the child, and related tasks.

Individuals who are assistant nurses follow orders from a registered nurse. They report back to the licensed nurse about a patient's condition. Assistant nurses are always supervised by a dentist, licensed registered nurse or physician.

== Nursing education ==
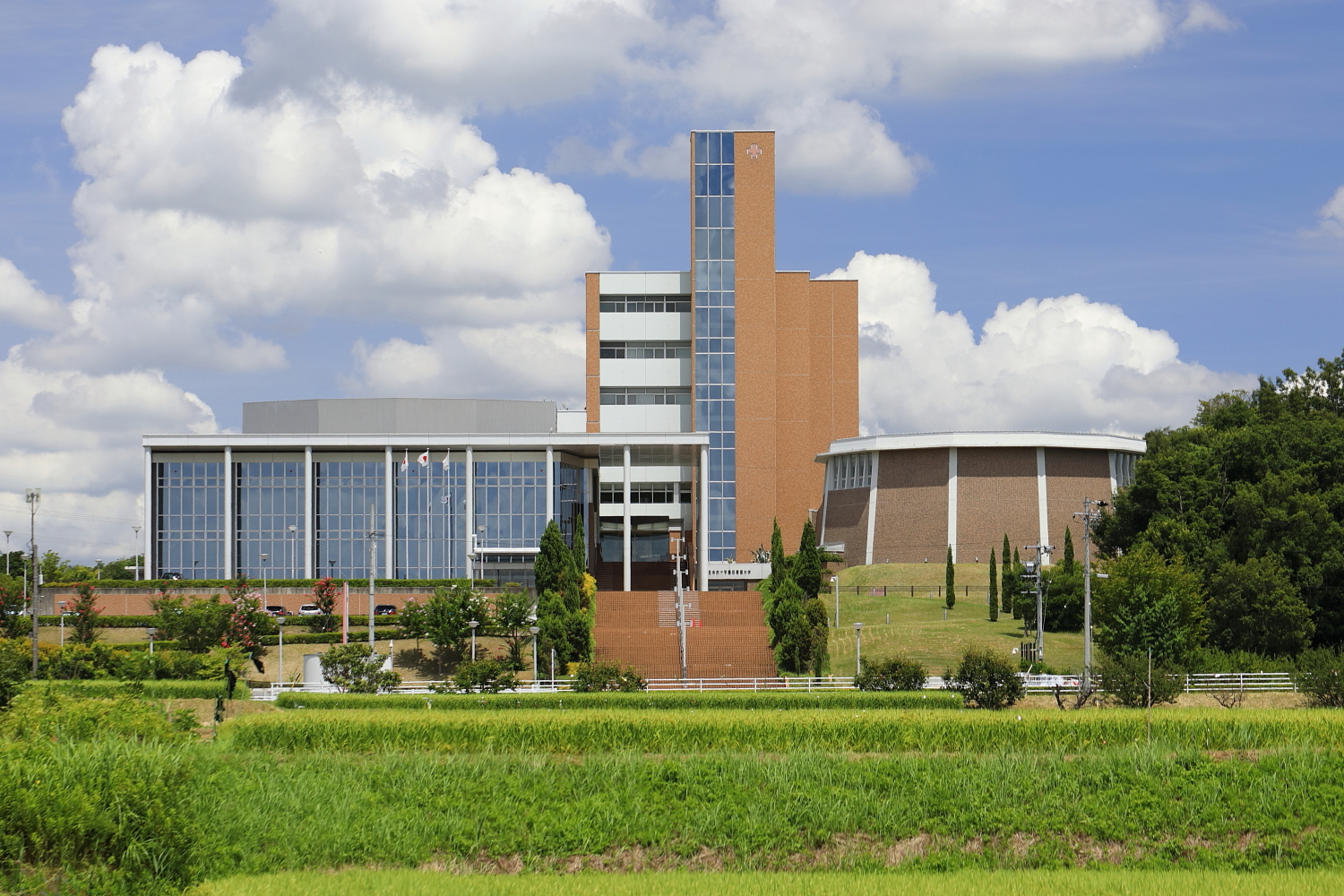
Japanese Red Cross Toyota College of Nursing

Requirements of nursing education in Japan are that candidates have completed twelve years of basic academic study and then three years of basic nursing education. Public health nurses and midwives require a minimum of one additional year of specialized study. After completing their studies, students must pass the national licensing examination and obtain a license from the Minister of Health, Labour, and Welfare in the case of nurses, or from the prefectural governor, for nurse assistants. Foreign nurses who wish to work in Japan are required to pass the licensing examination and obtain a Japanese nursing license.

To become a registered nurse in Japan, candidates must first obtain a high school degree and then either enroll in a nursing university for four years and earn a Bachelor of Science in Nursing (BSN); attend a junior nursing college for three years, earning an Associate of Science in Nursing (ASN); or study at a nursing training school for three years and obtain a diploma. The Ministry of Education, Culture, Sports, Science and Technology (MEXT) regulates the curriculum of the colleges and universities, while the Ministry of Health, Labour, and Welfare's Division of Nursing regulates nursing diploma programs. The two Ministries jointly establish core curriculum, though individual schools may vary on additional requirements. The basic course study must include courses on: anatomy, adult health, basic nursing, children's health, disease and recovery studies, gerontological nursing, health support and social systems, home care nursing theory, maternity, mental health, nursing integration, psychiatric nursing, scientific thinking and the understanding of humans, life and society. Both theoretical study and clinical practice are required.

Upon completion of studies a national examination administered by the Division of Nursing of the Ministry of Health, Labour, and Welfare is required. Licenses are issued for the nurse's lifetime and require no renewal or continuing education. For nurses who wish to become Public Health Nurses or Midwives, post-graduate studies are required. Colleges, junior colleges, nurse training schools or universities offer courses for the additional training which must be for a minimum of one year. Additionally master's degrees are offered at some universities. As of 2010, all nurses are required to complete postgraduate clinical training.

=== Credentialing ===
The certification of nurse specialists is not legally specified in Japan, though the practice is widely accepted. The Japanese Nursing Association (JNA) certifies nurses in three categories: Certified Nurse, Certified Nurse Administrator and Certified Nurse Specialist. All three levels of certification require that the nurse pass the national nursing examination as well as a certification test administered by the JNA. Certifications must be renewed every five years.

Certified Nurses (CN) are required to take six months training in cancer and chemotherapy nursing, emergency care, hospice care, intensive care nursing, wound, ostomy, and continence nursing, and pain management nursing, after completion of their basic nursing licensing. As of July 2015, nearly 16,000 CNs were working in Japan in various specialties including cancer care, chronic care, dementia nursing, diabetes nursing, dialysis nursing, emergency care, heart care, infection control, infertility nursing, neonatal care, rehabilitative care, respiratory care, and other specialized fields.

Certified Nurse Administrators (CNA) are required to complete a master's program in management at a graduate school or university or a certification from a nurses training education program.

Certified Nurse Specialists (CNS) are required to complete a master's program for specialized fields, including Cancer Nursing, Child Health Nursing, Chronic Care Nursing, Community Health Nursing, Critical Care Nursing, Family Health Nursing, Gerontological Nursing, Home Care Nursing, Infection Control Nursing, Psychiatric/Mental Health Nursing or Women's Health Nursing, after obtaining their national licensing. In addition, certification requires a minimum of five years clinical experience.

Other professional groups also provide certification for clinical specialties such as community health, diabetes, disaster nursing, emergency nursing, intractable illness, nursing administration, and psychiatric nursing. These organizations predominantly emerged in the 1990s. They include the Japan Visiting Nursing Foundation, which was founded in 1994 to create and improve home care services for the elderly; the Japanese Family Nursing Society, which emerged in 1994 to focus on the education, practices and development of theory for family nurse practitioners; the Japanese Nursing Diagnosis Association and the Japan Society of Nursing Diagnosis focus on nursing diagnosis. Additional professional organizations include the Federation of Nursing Colleges and Association of Nurses, the International Nursing Foundation of Japan, the Japanese Midwives Association, and the Japanese Society of Nursing Research.

=== Nurse practitioners ===
Until 2015, nurses in Japan were required to work under the guidance of physicians. They were not allowed to diagnose conditions or prescribe medications without a doctor's directive. Socio-cultural custom giving doctors higher perceived social status and nurses the role of caretaker, led to nurses' lack of autonomy. In October 2015, the Act on Public Health Nurses, Midwives and Nurses was amended to allow nurses who had received specific training to act as nurse practitioners and intervene in certain situations without awaiting a physician's decision.

The training curricula requires completion of 315 study hours of common subjects and 15 to 72 study hours of subjects for specified categories of medicine. Participants must attend both lectures and participate in practical applications. Upon completion of the coursework, applicants must receive a certificate of completion. They may then perform specific medical interventions based upon those described in procedure manuals prepared by physicians.

== Current state ==
There is currently a shortage of nurses in Japan, in part due to the expanding population of elderly. Other reasons for the deficit in nursing applicants are poor working conditions, an increase in assigned workloads, the low social status of nurses, and the cultural idea that married women quit their jobs for family responsibilities. On average, Japanese nurses will make around 420,000 yen a month. Until 2000, nurses made up about 4.5% of the women's work force in Japan with almost two-thirds having nursing diplomas and only one percent having a BSN degree. The majority of nurses were female with only around three percent of the field being male. The largest segment of nurses are in their 30s and 40s with the average age being 41 in 2016 and hospitals are the major employer (61%) of nursing staff, followed by private clinics (21%).

After 1992, Nurse Centers were created in each prefecture by the Act on Assurance of Work Forces of Nurses and Other Medical Experts. These Centers provide placement, job training and recertification, if desired. They monitor nurses who are unemployed and support those who may wish to re-enter the work force. The most common reason for nurses to leave the work force is to raise a family, though heavy responsibilities, irregular shift work, long working hours, night shift duty, and poor working conditions/treatment accounted for part of the turnover. Government programs to improve working environments have been on-going since 2011.

One of the older unions that relates to nursing is the Japanese Federation of Medical Workers Union, which was created in 1957. It is a union that includes physicians as well as nurses. This organization was involved with the creation of the Nursing Human Resource Law.

== See also ==
Nursing by country (category)
