= Japanese Nursing Association =

Japan Nursing Association
- 日本看護協会
- Abbreviation: JNA
- Established: 1946; 79 years ago
- Location: Shibuya, Tokyo
- Website: www.nurse.or.jp

The Japanese Nursing Association (JNA) (日本看護協会, Nihon Kango Kyoukai) is the national professional association for midwives and nurses in Japan. It governs all subordinate nursing associations with jurisdiction in each of the 47 prefectures of Japan.

== History ==
In 1929 the director of the Japan Red Cross nursing division, Take Hagiwara, founded the Nursing Association of the Japanese Empire (日本帝国看護婦協会, Nippon Teikoku Kangofu Kyokai).

In 1933, the organization became a part of the International Council of Nurses (ICN) and had a nationwide membership of 1500 nurses.

Associations of midwives and public health nurses later developed. Historically, the members of the JNA were older, more educated nurses, and the organization was not seen as representing the needs of most nurses. As the organization grew into the largest nursing organization in the world, it became more representative of its members and serving their interests.

== Current organization ==
The current organization was established in 1946 to improve the quality of nursing, create positive working environments for nurses, and to develop a platform for expanding the field of nursing to meet individual and community needs. The organization was created to merge the Japanese Midwife Society, Japanese Public Health Nurses Association and the Nursing Association of the Japanese Empire into one umbrella organization. The organization is not a trade union, but rather, a professional organization and as such does not engage in collective bargaining.

The organization maintains a policy research group to develop nursing policies, has established a Nursing Code of Ethics, and implements standards for nursing practice, including certification protocols. The Association works with state and national organizations, lobbying for improvements in the nursing field and has provided testimony to assist policymakers and governmental organizations and offices in the development of standards and programs for nursing. The JNA maintains a library and research center, and operated a publishing company, which produces nursing journals, texts, and books. Publications include a biannual newsletter in the English language, as well as articles produced in the Japanese language on nursing developments.

The JNA provides nursing certifications for specialist nurses in three categories: Certified Nurse, Certified Nurse Administrator and Certified Nurse Specialist. All three levels of certification require that the nurse pass the national nursing examination as well as a certification test administered by the JNA. Certifications must be renewed every five years. Certified Nurses are required to take six months training in cancer and chemotherapy nursing, emergency care, hospice care, intensive care nursing, wound, ostomy, and continence nursing, and pain management nursing. Certified Nurse Administrators are required to complete a master’s program in management at a graduate school or university or a certification from a nurses training education program. Certified Nurse Specialists are required to obtain a master's degree in specialty medical fields and have five years of clinical experience before they are eligible to take the certification examination.

== See also ==
- List of nursing organizations
- Nurse
- Nursing
