= Mabel Evelyn Elliott =

British-American physician

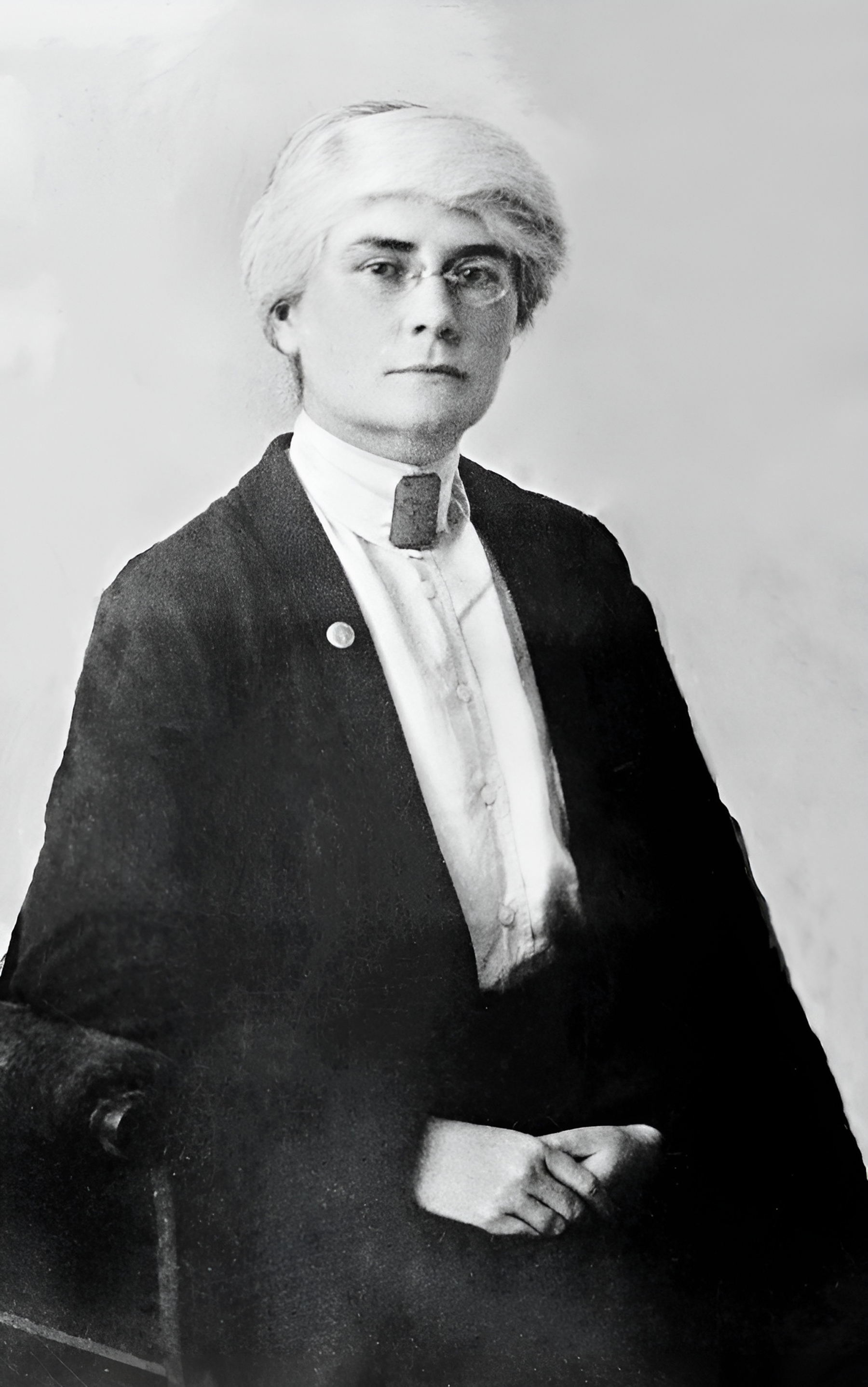
- Dr. Mabel E. Elliott, 1922
- Born: 8 February 1881; London, UK
- Died: 13 June 1968 (aged 87); West Palm Beach, Florida, U.S.
- Other name: Mabel E. Elliot
- Citizenship: United States
- Occupations: Physician, Humanitarian
- Years active: 1906-1958
- Known for: Humanitarian medical work
- Notable work: Beginning Again At Ararat, Book, 1924. Siege Diary from the Battle of Marash, Manuscript, 1920

Mabel Evelyn Elliott (8 February 1881 – 13 June 1968), sometimes written as Mabel Evelyn Elliot, was a British-born American physician who did post-war medical relief work in Turkey, Armenia, and Greece from 1919 to 1923. She continued her overseas medical service for the National Episcopal Mission Board in Japan from 1925 to 1941.

== Early life and education ==
Mabel Evelyn Elliott was born in London, England, the daughter of Joseph H. Elliott and Elizabeth Belle Ryan, one of fourteen Elliott children. Her father was a career British army officer stationed in India, born in Glasgow, Scotland. She moved to the United States with her family in 1883, and grew up in St. Augustine and West Palm Beach, Florida. She attended high school in St. Augustine, Florida and at the St. Agnes School in Albany, New York.

She and her sister, Dr. Grace Elliott Papot, were among the first women to earn medical doctor degrees from the University of Chicago affiliated Rush Medical College, where the sisters graduated in the class of 1904. Elliott did a two-year internship at Cook County Hospital.

== Early medical career ==
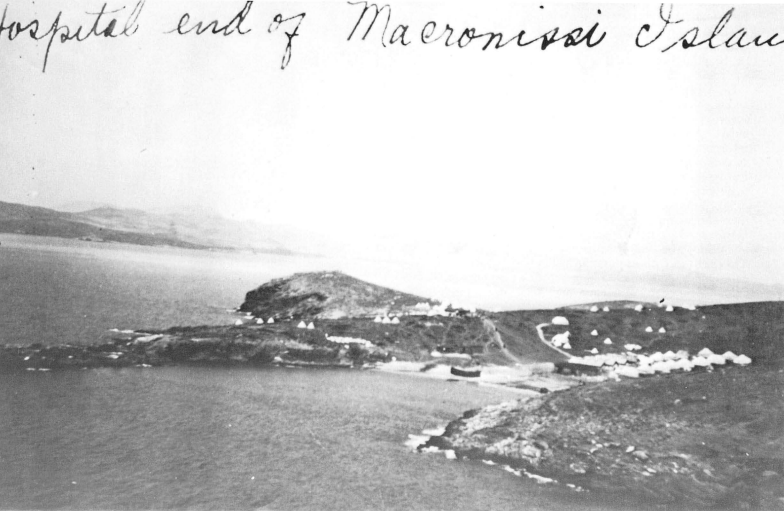
Macronissi Quarantine camp, 1924

In 1906, Elliott opened her first medical practice in Coloma, Michigan. She moved her practice to nearby Benton Harbor, Michigan in 1909. In 1915, Elliott was named president of the Berrien County Medical Association, the first woman physician to hold this position.

== Relief work in the Near East ==
Elliott had volunteered for service with the Red Cross in France during World War I, but the war ended before she was called up for duty. She volunteered for service with the newly-formed American Women's Hospitals Service in 1918. The American Women's Hospital Service coordinated with Near East Relief to aide Armenian and Greek refugees following World War I. Elliott was called to duty January 1919 and directed to report to New York. She sailed on the USS Leviathan with 250 other Near East Relief personnel and physicians and nurses from the American Women's Hospital Service.

=== Marash, Turkey ===
Elliott's first duty station was in Marash, Turkey. In May 1919, she set up and directed a three-story hospital that was built by German missionaries. The hospital treated Armenian refugees, providing medical care with a staff of Elliott, one American nurse, and Armenian nurses and doctors. The control of Marash was transferred from British to French forces in December 1919. In January 1920, Turkish forces in Marash loyal to Mustafa Kemal began their fight for Turkish independence. Elliott's hospital came under fire, forcing her staff to move the patients to the first floor to avoid gunfire. The hospital was under siege in the Battle of Marash, where thousands of Armenian refugees were massacred. Elliott kept a detailed diary of the siege, wanting to leave a written account in the event she did not survive the ordeal. Her siege diary served as the beginning of a memoir she would write in 1924.

The French forces announced they were evacuating from Marash and ordered all foreign relief workers to retreat. On 10 February 1920, Elliott left with her American nurse Mabel Hazen Power and the Armenian medical staff, knowing the Armenian staff would likely be killed by the Turks if left behind. She led her staff and joined thousands of refugees on foot. They trekked 75 miles (120 kilometers) across the Taurus Mountains for three days, braving freezing temperatures and a blizzard that killed half of the Armenian refugees. The group found Islahiye, Turkey in the blizzard by hearing the train whistle from the town. Elliott and her staff reached safety via a train from Islahiye to Adana, Turkey.

=== Return to the United States ===
Elliott sailed back to the United States in May 1920 via France to recuperate from the ordeal with her parents in West Palm Beach, Florida. She decided to return to the Near East for another year of duty with the American Women's Hospital after she was recruited by Dr. Esther Pohl Lovejoy. She was named Interim Executive Chairman of the American Women's Hospital Service in New York City in August 1920, replacing Dr. Lovejoy, who ran for Congress from Oregon, but was defeated.

=== Ismid, Turkey ===
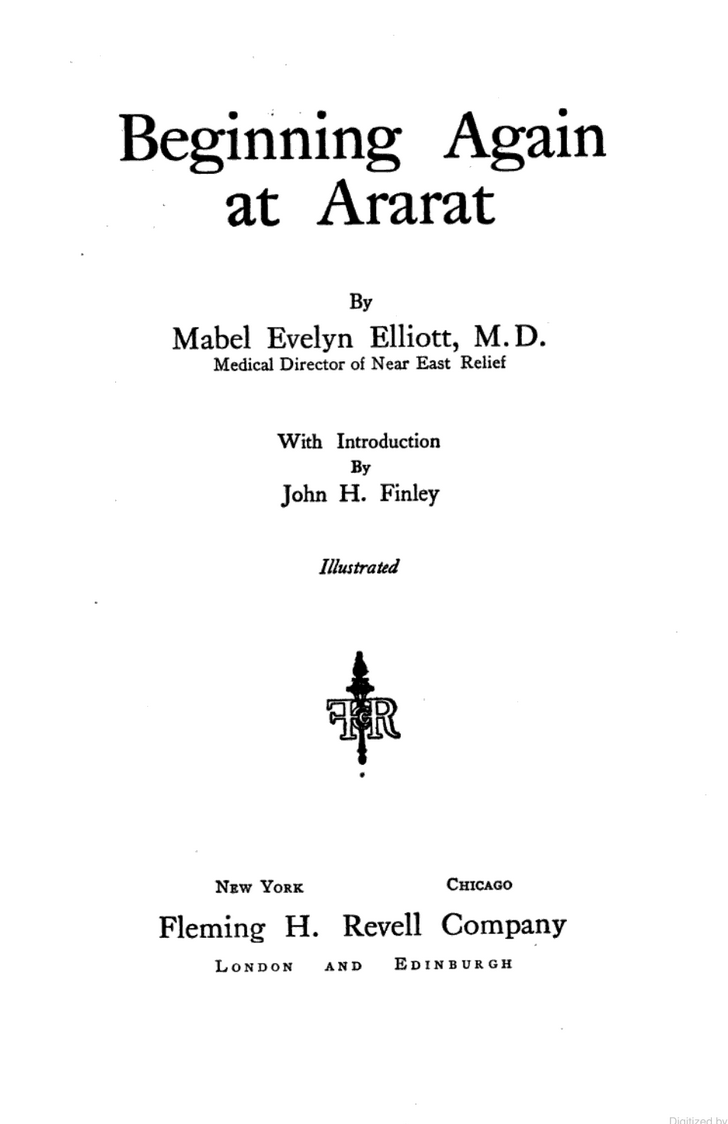
Title page of Mabel Evelyn Elliott, Beginning Again at Ararat (1924)

In October 1920 Elliott sailed back to the Near East, arriving in Constantinople (today's Istanbul). Nearby, on the Sea of Mamara, Elliott set up a hospital in Ismid, Turkey in an old Turkish Hospital that had been used as army barracks. Tensions again began to rise with Mustafa Kemal's revolutionary forces attacking Ismid and Bardizag, a nearby village. Again, Elliott was holed up in a hospital, being fired upon and threatened. Thousands of Armenian refugees descended upon the city, leaving Elliott as the only physician in the city. The American Women's Hospital Service decided to close the hospital in Ismid shortly thereafter.

=== Soviet Armenia ===
The American Women's Hospital Service transferred Elliott to Soviet Armenia in 1921. As medical director for Soviet Armenia, she served in hospitals and orphanages in Erivan and Alexandropole. In Alexandropole Elliott set up three "towns" as orphanages, each town housing six to seven thousand Armenian orphans. Children were fed, schooled, and taught vocational skills. Several infectious diseases were rampant in the children, including trachoma, typhus, tuberculosis, favus, and scabies.

=== Athens, Greece ===
Elliott's next duty station was at Athens, Greece as General Medical Director for American Women's Hospitals for all medical work in Greece in 1922. After a few weeks leave in Europe and making a speech at an international conference in Geneva, Switzerland Elliott hastily returned to Greece in the wake of the burning of Smyrna in September 1922. Elliott set up hospital facilities for 40,000 Greek and Armenian refugees. Elliott assisted refugees on the island city of Mytilene, where refugees were pouring in from the mainland, trying to escape Smyrna. She worked closely with fellow American physicians including Esther Pohl Lovejoy and Ruth Parmelee, and set up a quarantine station on the island of Macronissi.

The Greek monarchy decorated Elliot with several medals, including the Greek War Cross, and Gold and Silver St. George medals in February 1923.

In July 1923 Elliott resigned her position as General Medical Director for American Women's Hospitals, citing interference from certain members the American Women's Hospital governing board. She returned to the United States in October 1923.

== Memoir ==
In 1922, Near East Relief approached Elliott about working on a memoir of her years in the Near East. Elliott's siege diary, kept during the Battle of Marash in 1920, became the genesis of her memoir. Near East Relief hired Rose Wilder Lane, noted journalist, novelist, and writer, to assist Elliott in the organization and editing of the book. Lane's name did not appear on the cover, but Elliott acknowledged her assistance in the book's preface, referring to a "Mrs. Lane." Fleming H. Revell published the book 5 January 1924 as Beginning Again at Ararat. Rose Wilder Lane's co-authorship of the book was uncovered during research for Elliott's biography. Both Elliott and Lane were listed in the book's contract, now held at Baker Publishing. The book was republished in 2025 as Children of Ararat, its intended title.

Elliott went on a book tour of the United States, speaking at churches, colleges, women's clubs, and state legislatures. The book was well received in several reviews for its depiction of the plight of Armenian and Greek refugees in the Near East. Near East Relief awarded Elliott the DIstinguished Service Medal in recognition of her meritorious service in the Near East.

Excerpts from the memoir were used in the 2016 documentary film "They Shall Not Perish." Elliott's voice was dramatized by actress Kathleen Chalfant.

== Women's Medical College in Philadelphia ==
In 1924, Elliott joined the staff of the Woman's Medical College Hospital in Philadelphia (today's Drexel University). She had been offered the medical chair of the Constantinople Women's College in Turkey, but declined.

== Medical missionary work in Japan ==
Foreign service once again called Elliott, this time in the Far East. in 1925 she was selected from fifty candidates to lead the public health department of St. Luke's International Medical Center in Tokyo, Japan. She was sent as a physician and medical missionary on behalf of the National Episcopal Mission Board, which operated the hospital. Elliott was the first American woman doctor to be licensed in Japan.

In 1929, Elliott went on a speaking and fund-raising tour of the United States with St. Luke's International Medical Center founder Rudolf Teusler, who founded the hospital in 1901. She took leave from the hospital from 1934 to 1935 to travel and do additional study at Johns Hopkins.

Elliott was promoted to become chief of pediatrics at St. Luke's International Medical Center. Elliott, along with all U.S. foreign nationals, was forced to leave Japan in 1941, shortly before the United States entered World War II.

== Later work and retirement ==
Upon her return to the United States in 1941, Elliott settled in West Palm Beach, Florida. She worked in New York City from 1944 to 1945, examining church workers and missionaries returning from World War II. She lived in semi-retirement, occasionally serving as the physician-in-residence at Penney Farms, near Jacksonville, Florida.

== Personal life ==
Elliott lived with older sister Beatrice Elliott for many years in Michigan, Japan, New York, and later in retirement in Florida. They traveled extensively in the United States as well as in Europe. Elliott died in West Palm Beach, Florida in 1968, at the age of 87.
