= Clinical Journal of Oncology Nursing =

- Discipline: Oncology nursing
- Language: English
- Edited by: Joni L. Watson

Publication details
- History: 1997-present
- Publisher: Oncology Nursing Society (United States)
- Frequency: Bimonthly
- Impact factor: 1.1 (2022)

Standard abbreviations
- ISO 4: Clin. J. Oncol. Nurs.

Indexing
- ISSN: 1092-1095 (print); 1538-067X (web)
- LCCN: 97640979
- OCLC no.: 36102186

Links
- Journal homepage

The Clinical Journal of Oncology Nursing is a bimonthly peer-reviewed nursing journal covering oncology nursing. It was established in 1997 and is published by the Oncology Nursing Society. The editor-in-chief is Joni L. Watson.

== Abstracting and indexing ==
The journal is abstracted and indexed in CINAHL, MEDLINE/PubMed, EBSCO Health Source: Nursing/Academic Edition, PsycINFO, ProQuest Nursing and Allied Health Source, Science Citation Index Expanded, Social Sciences Citation Index, and Current Contents/Social & Behavioral Sciences. According to the Journal Citation Reports, the journal has a 2022 impact factor of 1.1.
