= Oncology Nursing Foundation =

The Oncology Nursing Foundation is a national nonprofit, tax-exempt, charitable organization in the United States, established on November 27, 1981, by the Oncology Nursing Society. The Pittsburgh-based organization is dedicated to sustaining and advancing oncology nursing and funded by corporate and private donations.

The Oncology Nursing Foundation awards both oncology nursing academic scholarships and oncology nursing research grants. Funding is also awarded for leadership, academic, lectureships, and career development, as well as cancer public education projects and scholarships to the ONS Congress, Institutes of Learning, and APN Conferences.

== See also ==
- Oncology Nursing Society
- Oncology Nursing Certification Corporation
