= Oncology Nursing Forum =

- Discipline: Oncology nursing
- Language: English
- Edited by: Debra Lyon

Publication details
- History: 1977-present
- Publisher: Oncology Nursing Society
- Frequency: Bimonthly
- Impact factor: 1.728 (2019)

Standard abbreviations
- ISO 4: Oncol. Nurs. Forum

Indexing
- ISSN: 0190-535X (print); 1538-0688 (web)
- OCLC no.: 863062327

Links
- Journal homepage; Online access; Online archive

Oncology Nursing Forum is a bimonthly peer-reviewed nursing journal covering oncology nursing. It was established in 1977 and is published by the Oncology Nursing Society. The editor-in-chief is Debra Lyon. According to the Journal Citation Reports, the journal has a 2019 impact factor of 1.728.
