= Oncology Nursing Society =

The Oncology Nursing Society (ONS) is a nonprofit membership organization of more than 35,000 members committed to promoting excellence in oncology nursing and the transformation of cancer care.

ONS traces its origin to the first National Cancer Nursing Research Conference, supported by the American Nurses Association and the American Cancer Society in 1973. Following this conference, a small group of oncology nurses met to discuss the need for a national organization to support their profession. Since its official incorporation in 1975, it has grown to include 215 chapters. It provides information and education to nurses around the world. In addition, the society plays an active role in advocacy activities at the local, state, national, and international levels. ONS produces the largest conference dedicated to oncology nursing, Congress, held annually.

ONS members represent a variety of professional roles, practice settings, and subspecialty practice areas. Registered nurses, including staff nurses, advanced practice nurses, case managers, educators, researchers, consultants, and other healthcare professionals, are eligible for membership. The society offers information and resources for nurses at all levels, in all practice settings, and in all subspecialties.

== Nursing education ==
ONS is accredited as a provider of continuing nursing education by the American Nurses Credentialing Center's Commission on Accreditation. ONS is also accredited as a provider of continuing education by the California Board of Registered Nursing, Provider #2850.

ONS offers online and in-person education for oncology nurses to stay current on the latest cancer treatments and symptom management techniques. The society also holds both in-person and e-conferences.

== Publications ==
ONS publishes two scholarly journals: the Oncology Nursing Forum and the Clinical Journal of Oncology Nursing.

The Society's news magazine, ONS Voice, is published both in print and online.

ONS also publishes books, guidelines, and standards for the cancer care community.

== Advocacy ==
ONS participates in a variety of advocacy activities. It lobbies Congress on behalf of nursing and especially oncology nursing.

For example, ONS signed on to the nursing consensus statement to improve patients’ access to, cost, and quality of treatment as part of the 2010 healthcare reform. It also advocated with the nursing community for nursing provisions to be included as part of the healthcare reform bills.

=== Cancer Patient Treatment Education Bill ===
With Representative Steve Israel as the bill sponsor, ONS reintroduced the Assuring and Improving Cancer Treatment Education and Cancer Symptom Act (H.R. 1661) to the House of Representatives in 2013. The legislation would provide for Medicare reimbursement of the time that registered nurses spend educating people diagnosed with cancer and their caregivers about their disease and the effects of treatment.

== ONSEdge ==
ONSEdge was a former healthcare intelligence company and the former for-profit subsidiary of the Oncology Nursing Society. It specialized in a core group of services: healthcare advisory boards, ancillary events at oncology nursing conferences, speaker bureau programs, strategic planning and marketing support, market research, and communications and awareness campaign development and support.

== See also ==
- Oncology Nursing Foundation
- Oncology Nursing Certification Corporation
- List of nursing organizations
