= Agnes Vetch =

Scottish nurse (1842–1942)

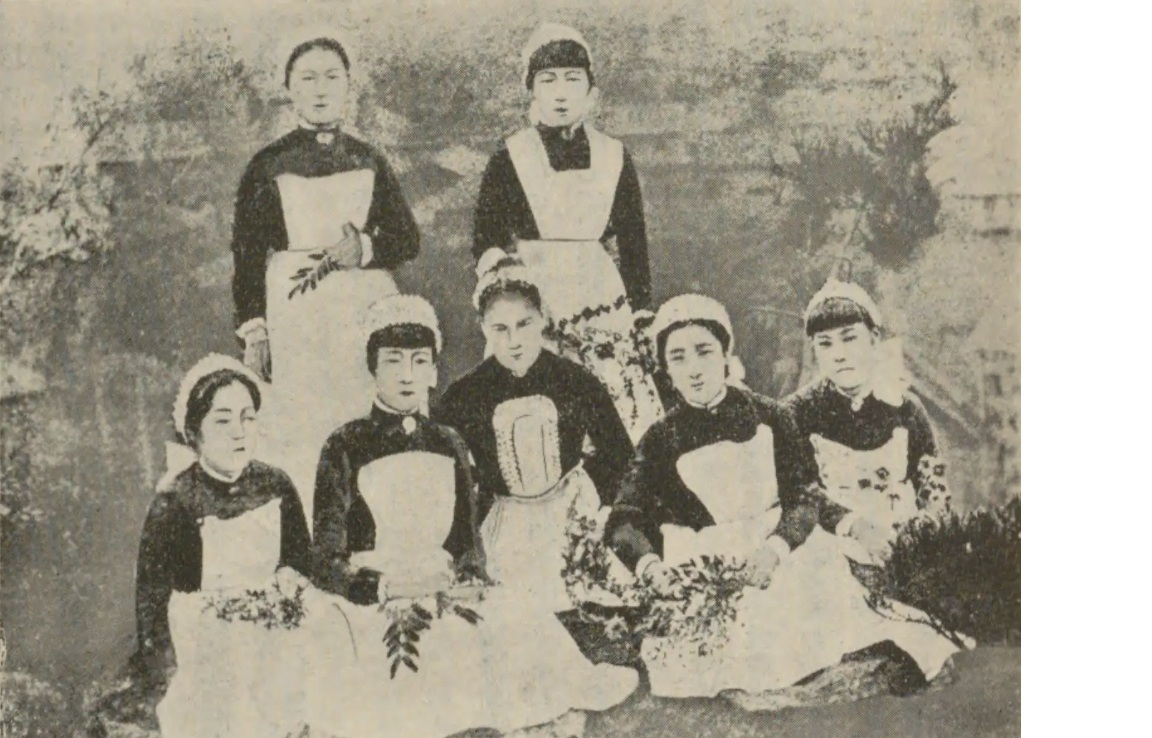
- Nursing students of Sakurai Girls' School, Tokyo, 1888. Agnes Vetch is believed to be seated in the centre of the front row.
- Born: 1842; Edinburgh
- Died: 1942 (aged 99–100); Edinburgh
- Occupation: Nurse
- Known for: Pioneer of early nursing education in Japan

Agnes Vetch (1842–1942) was a Scottish nurse. She was amongst the first cohort of women admitted to the Nurse Training School at the Royal Infirmary of Edinburgh (RIE). After working in Edinburgh and London, she travelled to Japan, where she helped introduce professional nursing practices based on the principles of Florence Nightingale.

== Early life and training ==
Agnes Vetch was born in Edinburgh in 1842. On 29 May 1874, she was accepted as a probationer nurse at the Royal Infirmary of Edinburgh, becoming a member of the RIE Nurse Training School's first cohort, where she was trained in the Nightingale tradition. A training report described her as “Most excellent in character, thoroughly obedient, particularly gentle and kind. She has the art of making her ward homelike.” Vetch completed her training on 31 March 1875.

== Early nursing career ==
Just one day after completing her training, Vetch was appointed to oversee Dr George William Balfour's male ward at the RIE. She remained in this post until 25 November 1876, when she, along with five other nurses, travelled to Paddington to work at St Mary's Hospital, as sisters. The group were sent to St Mary's Hospital as part of an effort to promote the Nightingale system of nurse training.

Vetch left London on 30 October 1879 and returned to the RIE, where she her resumed responsibility for Dr Balfour's male ward. Eventually, Vetch stepped down from her role at the RIE “at her own wish” on 11 November 1881.

After leaving the RIE, Vetch sailed to China to visit her brother, a medical missionary.

== Work in Japan ==
In 1887, Vetch sailed from China to Japan, arriving in Tokyo on 6 September. In October of the same year, she began teaching nursing practices at the First Hospital of the Imperial University (now the University of Tokyo) Medical School. She was initially placed on a six-month contract, working seven hours a day for a salary of 80 yen per month. This contract was subsequently renewed for another six months.

At the same time, Vetch supervised six nursing students from Sakurai Girls’ School. During her year of teaching, Vetch lived with students from Sakurai Girls’ school in a rented house in Komagome (now part of Tokyo's Toshima ward)

On 29 May 1888 Empress Shōken visited the First Hospital of the Imperial University and held an audience with nursing teachers and students. It has been suggested that Vetch was present, although this has not been confirmed.

On 26 October 1888, 28 nursing students graduated under Vetch's instruction, including Kazu Ozeki and Masako Suzuki, the latter of whom qualified as both a nurse and a nursing teacher. Vetch has been credited with helping to introduce Nightingale-style professional nursing education in Japan.

== Later life ==
Vetch left Japan for Hong Kong on 11 November 1888 and then sailed to Australia. Whilst in Australia, she continued with her nursing work and met with the novelist Robert Louis Stevenson.

Throughout her extensive travels, Vetch made several trips back to Scotland. Her final journey home took place in 1938. Vetch returned to Edinburgh, where she remained until her death in 1942.
