= St. Luke's International University =

Coordinates: 35°40′3.8″N 139°46′31.5″E

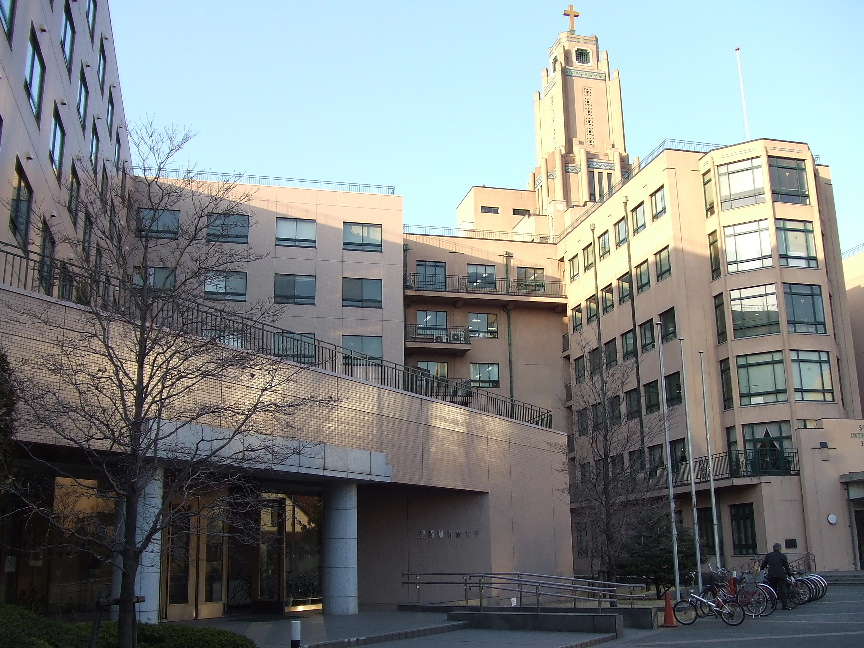
St. Luke's College of Nursing

St. Luke's International University (聖路加国際大学, Seiruka kokusai daigaku) is a private university in Chuo, Tokyo, Japan, formerly called St. Luke's College of Nursing. The school started in 1920 as a high school to educate nurses for the affiliated St. Luke's International Hospital. It was chartered as a three-year college in 1954 and became a four-year college in 1964. In 1980 and 1988 postgraduate doctoral programs were established, including a Doctor of Nursing Practice (DNP) course.
