= Oncology Nursing Certification Corporation =

- Company type: nonprofit
- Founded: 1984; 41 years ago
- Headquarters: Pittsburgh, PA, USA
- Website: www.oncc.org

The Oncology Nursing Certification Corporation (ONCC) is a nonprofit organization established for the development, administration, and evaluation of programs for certification in oncology nursing. Incorporated in 1984 and governed by a board of directors, ONCC is the certifying body for oncology nursing and meets standards established by the Accreditation Board for Specialty Nursing Certification. It is accredited by the National Commission for Certifying Agencies.

== Certification ==
=== Programs ===
- Oncology Certified Nurse (OCN)—basic level certification focused on adult oncology
- Certified Pediatric Hematology Oncology Nurse (CPHON)—basic level certification focused on pediatric oncology/hematology
- Advanced Oncology Certified Nurse Practitioner (AOCNP)—role-specific, advanced level certification for the oncology nurse practitioner who holds a master’s or higher degree in nursing and has completed a nurse practitioner program
- Advanced Oncology Certified Clinical Nurse Specialist (AOCNS)—role specific, advanced level certification for the oncology clinical nurse specialist who holds a master’s or doctorate degree in nursing
- Certified Breast Care Nurse (CBCN)—role-specific specialty certification focused on breast care
- Blood and Marrow Transplant Certified Nurse (BMTCN)—specialty certification that addresses blood and marrow transplantation nursing in adults and children
- Certified Pediatric Oncology Nurse (CPON)—basic level certification focused on pediatric oncology
- Advanced Oncology Certified Nurse (AOCN)—advanced level certification focused on adult oncology

=== Eligibility ===
All ONCC certification candidates must hold an active, unencumbered RN license to be eligible to take an ONCC examination. In addition, each ONCC certification has specific eligibility criteria for education and experience that must be met before the candidate takes the examination.

=== Testing ===
All ONCC examinations are offered at more than 300 computer-based testing centers located in North America and at selected international test sites. Certification is granted to candidates who meet the eligibility criteria and successfully complete a comprehensive multiple-choice examination.

=== Renewal ===
There are three components to certification renewal: practice hours, professional development activities, and successful retesting. Two of the three components must be met to renew certification. Three renewal options are available, based on the combinations of these renewal components.

- Option 1: practice hours + professional development activities
- Option 2: practice hours + successful testing
- Option 3: professional development activities + successful testing

== Number of certified oncology nurses ==
Currently, 30,302 nurses are certified as OCN, 1,141 as CPON, 840 as AOCN, 1,180 as AOCNP, 415 as AOCNS, 826 as CBCN, and 1,617 as CPHON.

== See also ==
- Oncology Nursing Society
- Oncology Nursing Foundation
- List of nursing organizations
- Oncology nursing
- Nursing credentials and certifications
