= Take Hagiwara =

Japanese nurse (1873–1936), Florence Nightingale Medal recipient

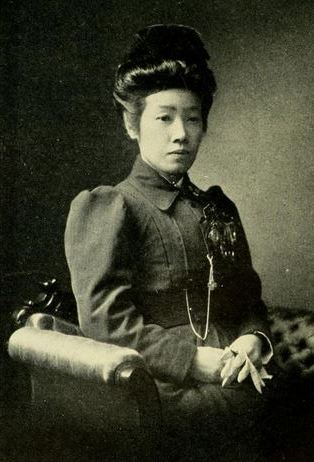
- Born: 萩原タケ; 7 February 1873; Itsukaichi village, Nishitama District, Kanagawa Prefecture, Japan
- Died: 27 May 1936 (aged 63); Tokyo, Japan
- Occupation: nurse
- Years active: 1894-1936
- Known for: pioneering nursing in Japan

Take Hagiwara (Japanese: 萩原タケ) (1873-1936) was a Japanese nurse, trained by the Red Cross, and sometimes referred to as the "Japanese Nightingale". She graduated from nursing school in 1897 and after touring Europe and studying hospitals there, was appointed as the first commoner to direct the Japanese Red Cross. In 1920, she led a successful campaign to assist Polish orphans who had become refugees in Siberia and that same year was one of the inaugural recipients of the Florence Nightingale Medal. She served as an honorary delegate to the International Council of Nurses (ICN) for 22 years before she was able to found the Nursing Association of the Japanese Empire in 1929 and gain full admission to the ICN in 1933. She was the Superintendent of Nursing for the Japanese Red Cross for 36 years.

== Early life ==
Take Hagiwara was born on 7 February 1873 in Itsukaichi village of the Nishitama District in Kanagawa Prefecture, Japan. Her parents were Chiyo and Hee Saemon Hagiwara and she was the eldest child and only girl, with five younger brothers. During the Edo period, the family had been coal wholesalers, but by the time Hagiwara was born, her father operated a straw house, bringing straw from rice farmers to sell. The family had little income and the mother took in work to help make ends meet. When she was around five years old, Hagiwara enrolled in the Susumuno School and though her marks were high, had to quit after three years to care for her siblings. She studied on her own for a time, reading in between tending her brothers, and then around 1885 started helping in the Kojima Clinic and became fascinated with medicine.

From about age fifteen, Hagiwara began a correspondence course and studied arithmetic, chemistry, geography, history, Japanese calligraphy, Japanese poetry and physics. She completed all the requirements for the women's communication undergraduate degree being offered through the Woman Science Magazine (Japanese: 女学雑誌) and received a diploma in January 1891. She went to the capital and began studying at the Sakurai Midwife School, but had to leave due to financial concerns after a year. In the fall of 1892, the Japanese Red Cross began looking for nursing recruits and the following spring Hagiwara entered the JRC nurses' training program, as they did not charge for expenses or classes.

== Career ==
In 1894 the decision was made by the Red Cross to send nurses in the midst of their training to help with relief efforts when the Sino Japanese War broke out. Hagiwara was sent and received praise for her service; she was specifically requested to help with relief efforts in Aomori, Iwate, and Miyagi Prefectures when the 1896 Tsunami caused civil disasters in those areas. She graduated in 1897 from the Red Cross Nursing program and began working in relief efforts of various military campaigns. Hagiwara was awarded the Seventh Order of the Precious Crown for her service during the First Sino-Japanese War and later was awarded the Officier d’Academie from the French government for her service during the Boxer Rebellion in China.

Hagiwara had worked her way up the ranks to secondary lead nurse by the time she was sent to help during the Russo-Japanese War. In 1907, she became the honorary Japanese Associate National Member to the International Council of Nurses (ICN), as a nursing sister delegate for the Japanese Red Cross Society. That same year, Hagiwara was requested to become part of the royal entourage and traveled throughout Europe as an attendant, visiting hospitals along the way. She first accompanied the Marchioness Yamanouchi; then by 1909 was serving the Prince and Princess Nashimoto in Paris and had been selected as Chief Nurse of the Red Cross Nurses’ Union.

In 1909, Hagiwara attended the London Congress of the ICN and her paper for the conference was presented by Lavinia Dock, because Hagiwara did not speak English. After the congress, Hagiwara tried to meet Florence Nightingale, but the British nurse was very ill. Upon Nightingale's death the following year, Hagiwara held a memorial ceremony with nurses, executives and staff of the Japanese Red Cross, and dignitaries, officiated by a Shinto priest in Nightingale's honor. Hagiwara returned from traveling abroad and was appointed as the assistant inspector of nurses and student-nurses at the Central Hospital. In 1910, she was made Nursing Superintendent of the JRC Nurses, and was the first non-royal person to hold the post. She attended the 1912 ICN Congress in Cologne presenting another paper and then spoke at the banquet which created an educational foundation in the name of Nightingale. After her father's death in 1917, Hagiwara moved her mother and brother Mokichi to Ōmori, to be nearer to her work at the Red Cross.

In 1919, Hagiwara and the JRC assisted the Imperial Japanese Army in the Siberian Intervention during the Russian Revolution. Preceding the Russian Revolution, Poles, who had been exiled to Siberia or sought refuge there during World War I, numbered around 20 million people. During the intervention, the problem of Polish orphans became evident to Hagiwara. Anna Bielkiewicz and Józef Jakóbkiewicz, of Vladivostok had formed the Polish Rescue Committee, began collecting orphans from throughout the area and petitioned Western countries for help. When they were unsuccessful in the West, Bielkiewicz and Jakóbkiewicz sent petitions to Japan and the Polish American community. On behalf of the JRC, Hagiwara requested that the Japanese Government assist with orphan relief work and obtained government approval within seventeen days. In 1920, Hagiwara, along with Yao Yamamoto (Japanese: やまもと やを) and Ume Yuasa (Japanese: ゆあさ うめ) were awarded the Florence Nightingale Medal in its inaugural presentation for their nursing excellence.

Between July 1920 and July 1921, 375 Polish orphans were transported to Japan and to the care of the JRC nurses in Tokyo. The children suffered from typhoid and other diseases and one nurse, Fumi Matsuzawa, succumbed to infection from the children and died. After providing them with health services, as well as shoes and clothing, the JRC helped transport the children to Yokohama, where they were sent to Polish Relief Organizations in Seattle, Washington. Hagiwara went to the docks to speak to each child as they boarded the ship. A second transport of 390 children, then arrived in July, 1922, with the children sent to Osaka. As before, the children were restored to health by the JRC and given clothing and footwear, but this group were returned to Poland.

Hagiwara attended the 1929 Congress of the ICN held in Montreal and that same year finally was able to found the Nursing Association of the Japanese Empire. She was unanimously elected as president of the association. At the Paris Congress of the ICN held in 1933, Hagiwara saw a dream come true when the Nursing Association of the Japanese Empire was admitted as a full member to the council. Though her chronic asthma was worsening with age, Hagiwara continued to be active both in and out of the country until her death.

== Death and legacy ==
Hagiwara died on 27 May 1936 in Tokyo and was buried on 30 May 1936 with a large funeral hosted by the Japanese Red Cross. Her tomb is located in Akiruno-shi at the Owada Kotokuji Temple. In front of the branch office of the Akiruno City Hall in Itsukaichi is a bust of Hagiwara bearing the inscription "Take Hagiwara humanitarian of the nation" (Japanese: 「萩原タケ女史 人道のために国家のために」). She has been referred to in the press as "Japan's Florence Nightingale" or the "Japanese Nightingale".
