= Middle East Cancer Consortium =

Regional initiative for cancer research

Official Logo of the Middle East Cancer Consortium

The Middle East Cancer Consortium (MECC) is a regional initiative for cancer research and treatment. Established in 1996, MECC members include the United States, Cyprus, Egypt, Israel, Jordan, the Palestinian Authority, and Turkey. MECC aims to reduce the incidence and impact of cancer in the Middle East region through the solicitation and support of collaborative research and regional education. Its motto is: "Respect all people, collaborate in fighting human suffering, and help build a bridge for better understanding among all."

== Leadership ==
The executive director of MECC is Michael Silbermann.

== History ==
MECC was established through an official agreement of the ministries of health of its six member states in the Middle East. It has launched and sustained academic-based medical programs that bring together scientists, academicians and clinical professionals from its member countries, joined by medical personnel from many other countries in the Middle East.

Initially, MECC established a successful Middle Eastern Network of Cancer Registry Centers, involving medical professionals of the participating countries as part of a US National Cancer Institute initiative. The project began with the establishment of a regional network of cancer registries documenting the incidence of various cancers and stage of disease at diagnosis. From the start, the work in the region was based on collaborative efforts, consisting of training courses, workshops, and educational conferences.

== Achievements ==
MECC's achievements include:

- Establishing a baseline of information on palliative care services in its member countries, examining barriers to the delivery of palliative care that might exist, and promoting solutions.
- Initiating supplementary education and training in various formats, fellowships, and clinical exchanges, which have led to regional-scale palliative care projects.
- Initiation of palliative care programs in many Middle Eastern countries.
