= Iyo Araki =

Japanese nurse and educator (1877–1969)

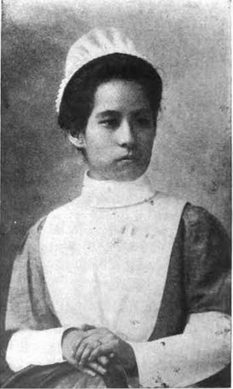
Iyo Araki, from a 1909 publication

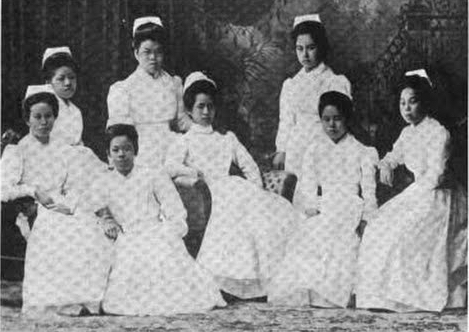
Iyo Araki, seated in center, with her students in nursing training school, St. Luke's Hospital, Tokyo, from a 1909 publication

Iyo Araki (1877–1969), also known as Iyo Araki San and later as Iyo Araki Kubo, was a Japanese nurse and nursing educator. She was superintendent of nurses and head of the nurses' training school at St. Luke's International Hospital in Tokyo from 1903.

== Early life ==
Araki attended St. Margaret's School in Tokyo, and first trained as a nurse in Japan. In 1900 she traveled to the United States to study nursing education, at Old Dominion Hospital in Richmond, Virginia, and Johns Hopkins Hospital in Baltimore, Maryland, sent by an American medical missionary, Dr. Rudolf Teusler.

== Career ==
Araki was on staff at a hospital in Kobe as a young woman. Beginning in 1903, she was superintendent of nurses and head of the nurses' training school at St. Luke's International Hospital in Tokyo, using a curriculum based on the American programs she examined in her studies. She presented a report about tuberculosis in Japan for the Sixth International Congress on Tuberculosis in 1908.

In 1918–1919, Araki led a unit of Japanese nurses working at an American Red Cross hospital at Russian Island. She resigned from teaching duties at St. Luke's in 1920, but remained as superintendent of nurses. She was prominent coordinating the hospital's response in the aftermath of Tokyo's 1923 Great Kantō earthquake, evacuating patients and keeping them alive when the hospital burned. In 1927–1928 she traveled again to the United States, on a fellowship from the Rockefeller Foundation, to study American hospitals. "Miss Araki is something of a national hero in her native country", noted The New York Times in 1927.

== Personal life ==
Araki married Rudolf Teusler's assistant and successor as director at St. Luke's, Dr. Tokutarō Kubo, in 1935. She was widowed when Dr. Kubo died in 1941. In 1951 she was honored by the Church of Japan as one of Tokyo's "semicentenarians", marking more than fifty years since her baptism. She died in 1969, aged 92 years.
