= Rudolf Teusler =

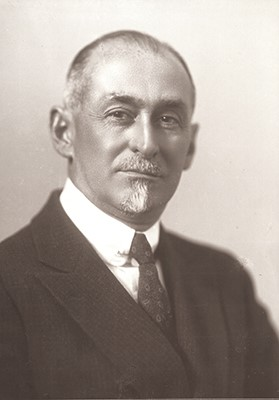
- Teusler in 1920
- Born: February 25, 1876; Rome, Georgia, United States
- Died: August 10, 1934 (aged 58); Tokyo, Japan
- Education: Medical College of Virginia
- Occupations: Medical physician, Anglican lay missionary
- Known for: founding St. Luke's International Hospital

Rudolf Bolling Teusler M.D. (February 25, 1876 - 10 August 1934) was a medical physician and lay missionary to Japan who worked under the auspices of the Foreign and Domestic Missionary Society of the American Episcopal Church.

Teusler is remembered in Japan as the founding physician, chief fundraiser and administrative head of St. Luke's International Hospital, an institution founded in 1901, that continues to operate as a high-profile hospital and medical teaching facility in central Tokyo. He is also remembered for his pioneering work in the establishment of Japan's first college of nursing, as well as for public health, child welfare and preventative medicine programs.

== Early life and career ==
Teusler was born in Rome, Georgia, and grew up in Richmond, Virginia. A cousin of First Lady of the United States, Edith Bolling Galt Wilson. A graduate of the Medical College of Virginia at the age of 18 in 1894. He went on to complete post graduate studies and internships at Bellevue Hospital New York, and other hospitals in Baltimore, Montreal and Quebec. He then returned to Richmond as an assistant professor of Pathology and Bacteriology at the Medical College of Virginia.

With encouragement from his brother-in-law, Rev. Edmund Lee Woodward M.D., a medical missionary to Anqing, China, Teusler and his wife Mary first set out for Japan in 1900, as the fourth medical physician and lay missionary appointed to that country under the auspices of the American Episcopal Church. As an active member of the Nippon Sei Ko Kai, Teusler organized and headed the Tokyo Chapter of the Brotherhood of St. Andrew, an Anglican men's group devoted to Bible study and active lay ministry.

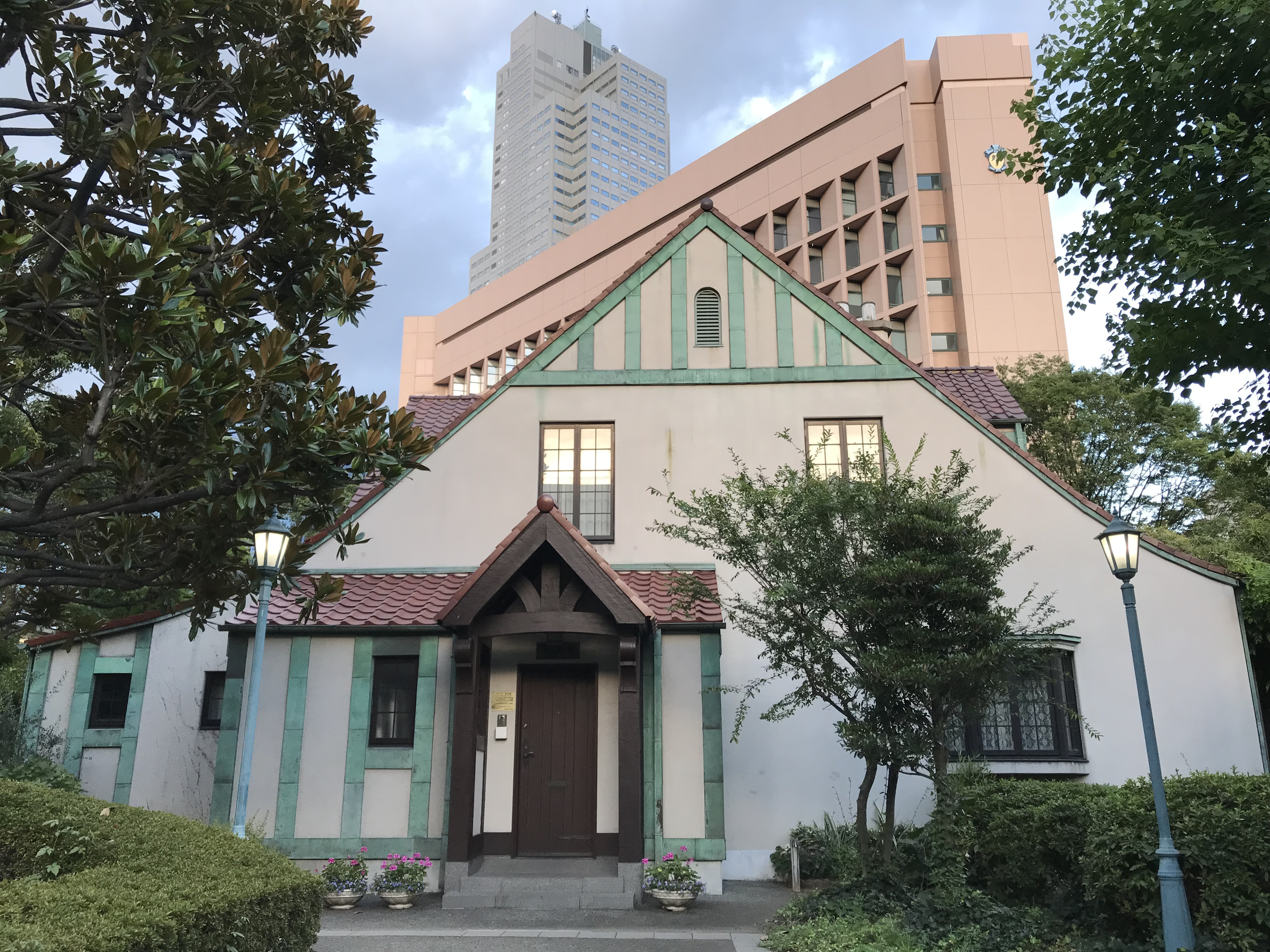
Teusler House: Former residence of Rudolf Teusler in Tokyo

Teusler was know for establishing the first professional training school for nurses in Japan, with his superintendent of nurses, Iyo Araki. Due to Teusler's reputation of being a gifted surgeon and with his skill as an administrator and fundraiser he founded the St. Luke's international Hospital,Tokyo in 1901. The hospital grew and expanded rapidly. Teusler's many supporters in the United States contributed generously to completely rebuild the hospital facilities in the wake of the Great Kantō earthquake in 1923. Teusler was also a far-sighted hospital administrator; he always choose to surround himself with Western-trained Japanese staff such as Dr. Kawase Motokuro and Iyo Araki as Head Nurse. He also ensured that the hospital was deeply rooted in japan so that it continues to flourish even after his retirement.

With the rank of Lt Colonel, Teusler also served as a Commissioner of the Red Cross, with Allied Forces in Vladivostok, Siberia from 1918 - 1921. In this capacity he organized field hospitals and medical teams across Siberia supplying medical relief to Czech, Slovak, and White Russian forces as they sought, unsuccessfully, to halt the advance of the Red Army.

== Awards and recognition ==
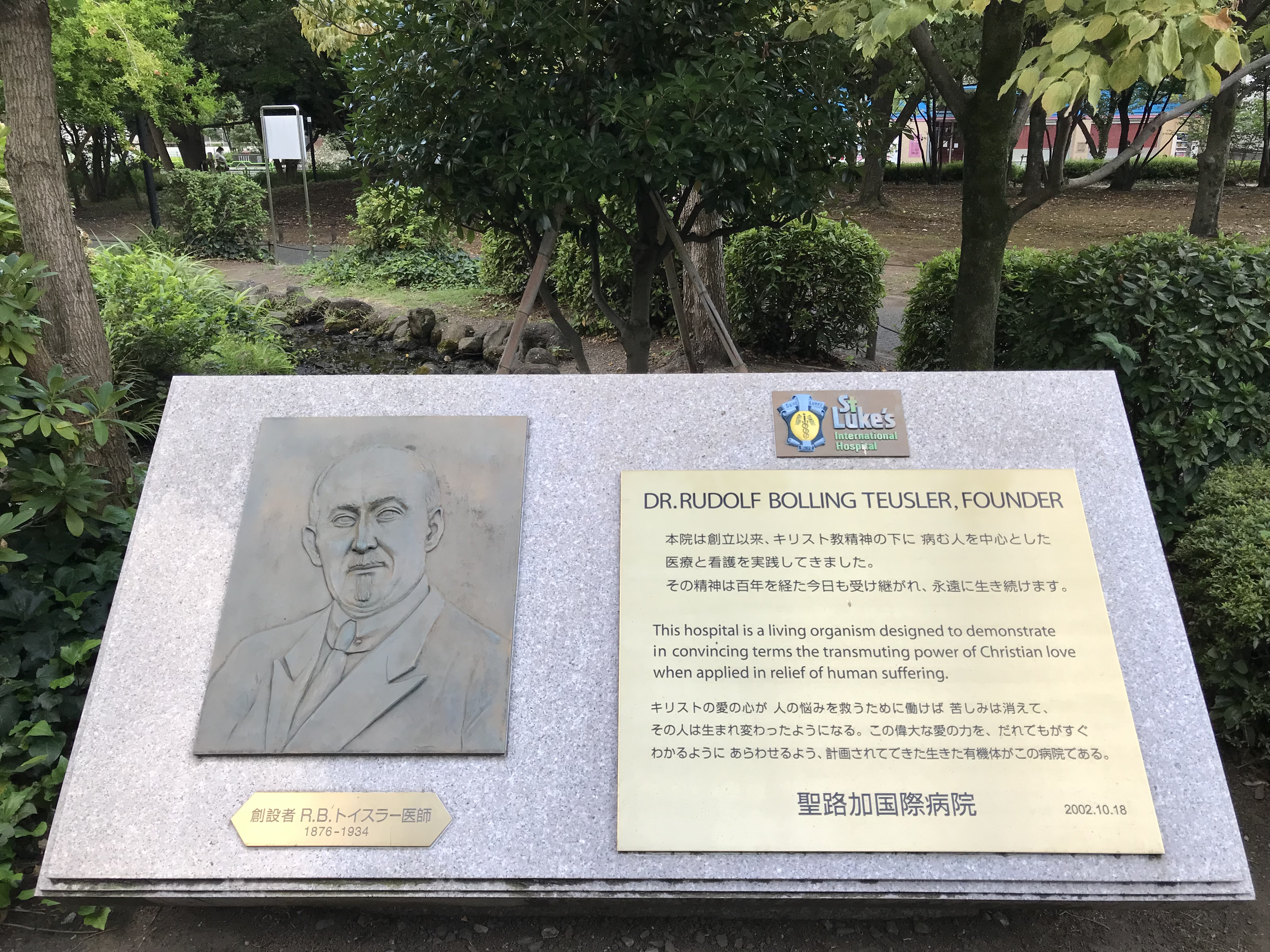
Memorial stone for Rudolf Teusler in Tokyo

Teusler was awarded the Fifth Star of the Order of the Rising Sun by the Japanese Government for his contributions to public health and the development of modern medical practice in Japan. He was also awarded the Russian medal of St. Vladimir and the Czechoslovak war medal for his assistance in the evacuation of injured Czech prisoners of war from Vladivostok.
