= St. Luke's International Hospital =

Hospital in Tokyo, Japan

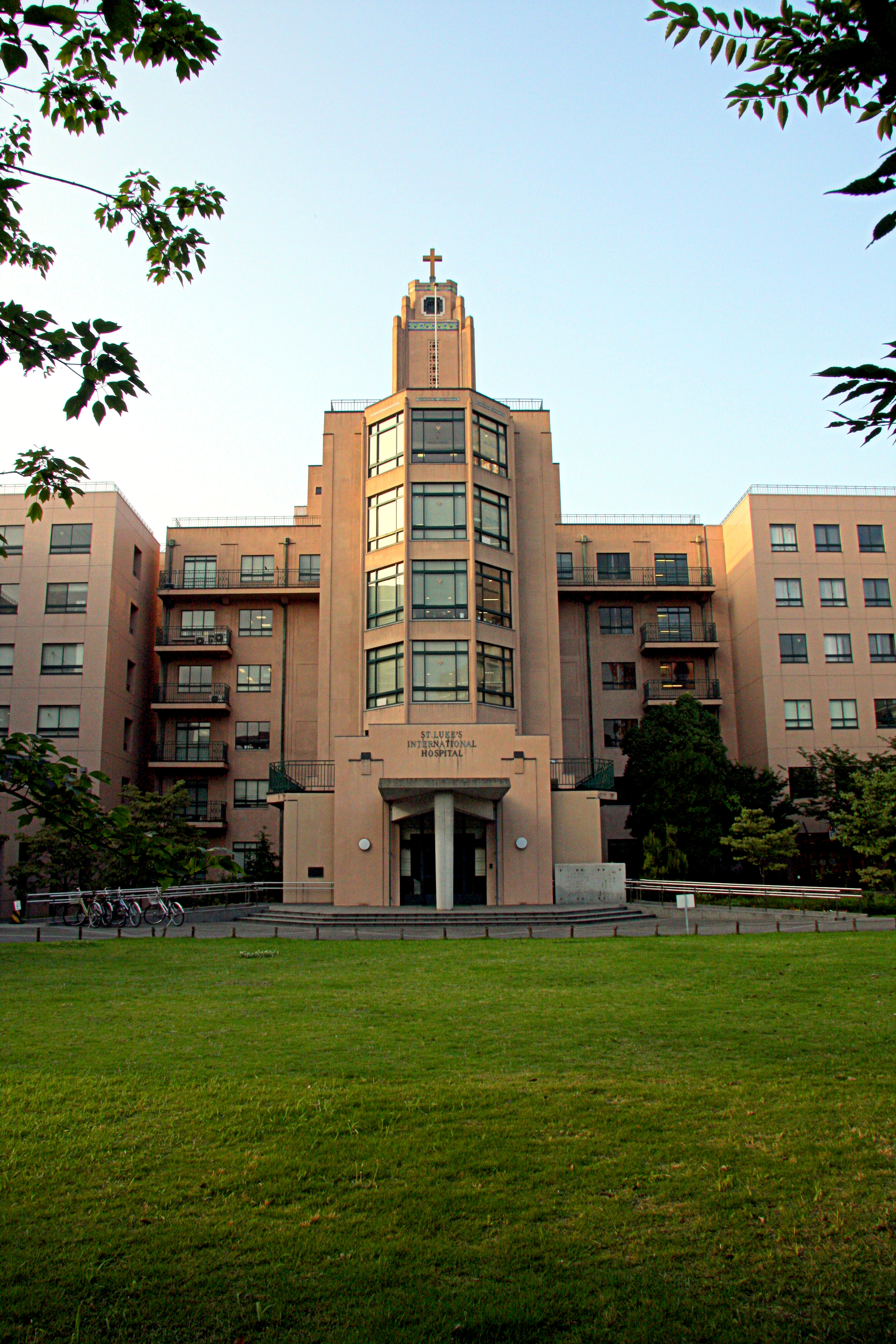
- Main entrance of St. Luke's International Hospital

Geography
- Location: 9-1 Akashi-cho, Chuo, Tokyo 104-8560, Japan
- Coordinates: 35°40′02″N 139°46′38″E

Organisation
- Care system: Religious, private not-for-profit school corporation
- Type: Teaching
- Religious affiliation: Nippon Sei Ko Kai (Anglican Episcopal Church in Japan)
- Affiliated university: St. Luke's International University

Services
- Emergency department: Yes
- Beds: 539

History
- Founded: 1902

Links
- Website: http://hospital.luke.ac.jp/eng/index.html
- Lists: Hospitals in Japan

St. Luke's International Hospital (聖路加国際病院, Seiruka Kokusai Byōin) is a general and teaching hospital located in the Akashicho district (adjacent to Tsukiji) in Chūō, Tokyo, Japan.

First opened in 1902, as a medical mission facility by the Episcopal Church in the United States, the hospital is now one of central Tokyo's largest and most comprehensive medical care facilities, having played a significant role in advancing medical care, education, and public health in modern Japan. It operates as an adjunct to St. Luke's International University, an affiliated university of the Nippon Sei Ko Kai (Anglican Episcopal Church in Japan).

== History ==
St. Luke's Hospital, initially a modest wooden-framed structure comprising two wards and five rooms, was first opened 1902 in Tsukiji on the edge of the foreign settlement. The hospital was transformed in the early years of the 20th century through the work of director Rudolf Teusler, and Superintendent of Nurses Iyo Araki, into the largest and most modern medical facility in Japan. Teusler, a Georgia-born, medical physician who first arrived in Japan in 1900 as a medical missionary of the Episcopal Church, focused his initial work in Japan on child health provision and on public health and hygiene.

The hospital was all but destroyed in the 1923 Great Kantō earthquake. As fundraising had already begun in the United States for new buildings on a larger site to a design by architect Antonin Raymond Teusler was able to count on the generosity of existing donors to rapidly rebuild. An early grant from the Rockefeller Foundation also supported the establishment of a public health institute. In 1927 St. Luke's College of Nursing became the first college of nursing established in Japan.

The hospital was able to remain open and continue its work throughout the Second World War; its staff of 40 doctors and 130 nurses remaining at their posts. At the end of the war, the medical center was requisitioned by the United States Army and operated as a U.S. Army hospital for eleven years. St. Luke's continued to provide medical services to the Japanese community from barracks facilities rented from the city of Tokyo throughout the post war years of occupation. The College of Nursing shared facilities with the Red Cross School of Nursing during this period.

St. Luke's buildings and facilities have been expanded and continually upgraded over many years, but remain located in the same area of Tsukiji in central Tokyo as the original hospital. St. Luke's retains its founder's strong links with the Anglican Church in Japan. The interior of the historic hospital chapel in the 1933 main building, was designed by architect John Van Wie Bergamini. The chapel remains one of the few original Anglican church structures in central Tokyo built prior to the Second World War.

== Facilities and operations ==
St. Luke's International Hospital is today a large general hospital serving the city of Tokyo as well as an internationally recognised teaching facility for medical professionals including post-graduate resident physicians and nurses.

The hospital has 539 beds and sees 2,550 outpatients on an average day. Departments include general internal medicine, pulmonary medicine, nephrology, hematology, infectious diseases, endocrinology and metabolism, psychosomatic internal medicine, allergy and rheumatology, cardiovascular internal medicine, cardiovascular surgery, ambulatory care center for children (pediatrics, pediatric surgery, well baby clinic), gastroenterology center (gastroenterology, general surgery), breast center, thoracic surgery, plastic and reconstructive surgery, orthopedic surgery, dermatology, integrated women's health, clinical genetics, urology, ophthalmology, otolaryngology, oral surgery, neurology and neurosurgery, psychiatry, emergency care center, diagnostic imaging and interventional radiology, radiation oncology, palliative care, pathology, anesthesia, kidney center, rehabilitation, comprehensive medical assessments, and neuroendovascular therapy.

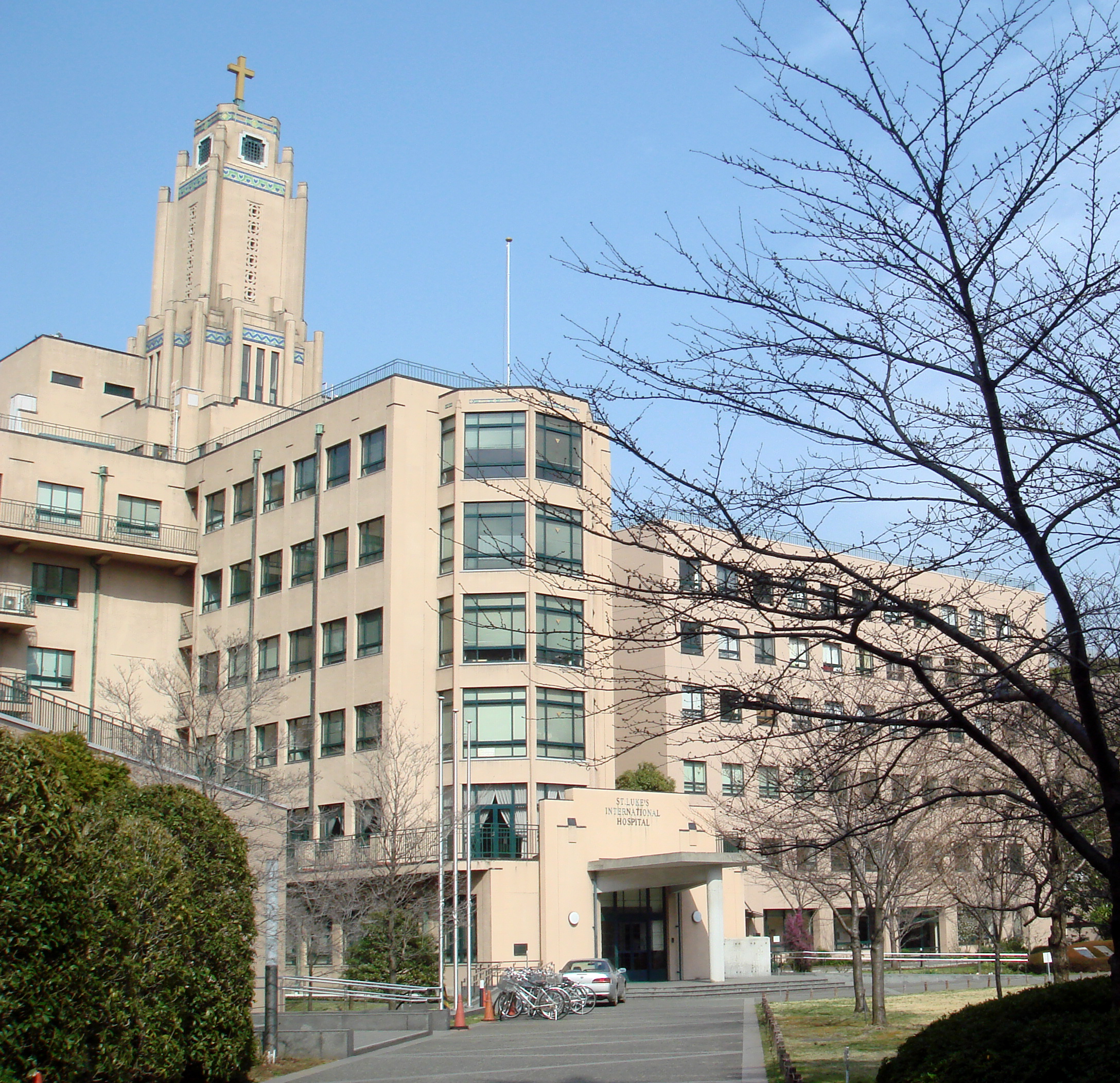
Original 1933 hospital building, housing the Teusler Clinic, Primary Care Clinic, Pediatric Medical Center, and Ambulatory Care Center for Children

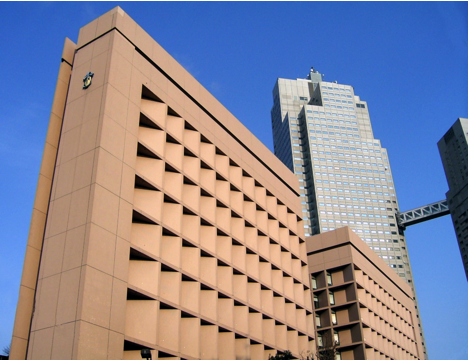
Main Building, including outpatient services, an inpatient ward, an ER, an HCU, an ICU, Children's Ward and the Oncology Center

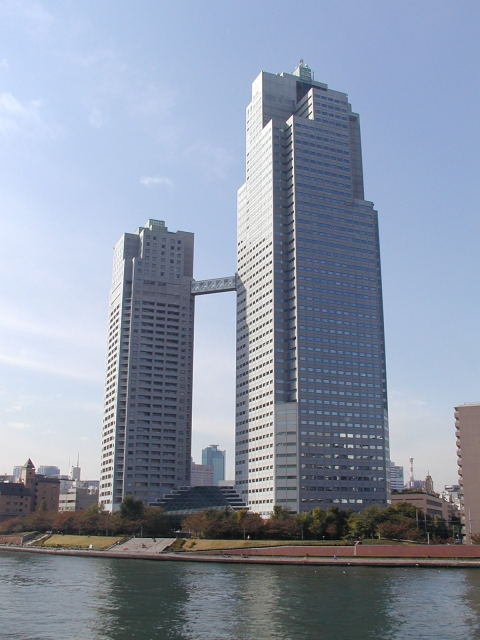
Saint Luke's Tower as seen from the Sumida River

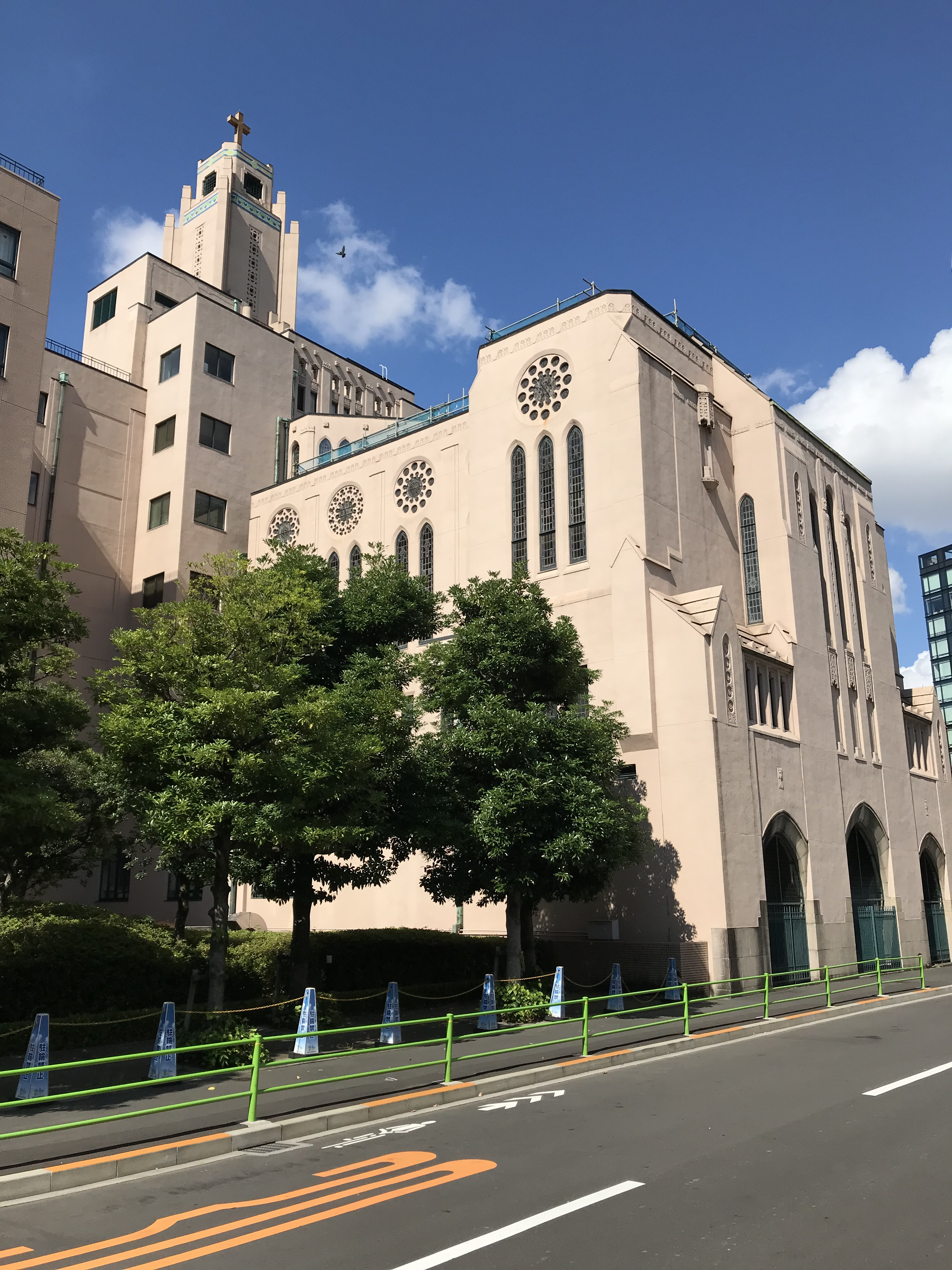
Saint Luke's Chapel

== Rankings ==
In various well-known hospital rankings, St. Luke's International Hospital falls within the top ten hospitals in Japan.

In 2008, 2009, and 2010, based on number of applicants designating it as their first choice in the match process, St. Luke's International Hospital ranked second in popularity among physician residencies in Japan.

== See also ==
- Sarin gas attack on the Tokyo subway, in which victims were treated at St. Luke's
- Mabel Evelyn Elliott, American physician who worked at the hospital from 1925-1941.
