= Oncology nursing =

Specialized branch of nursing

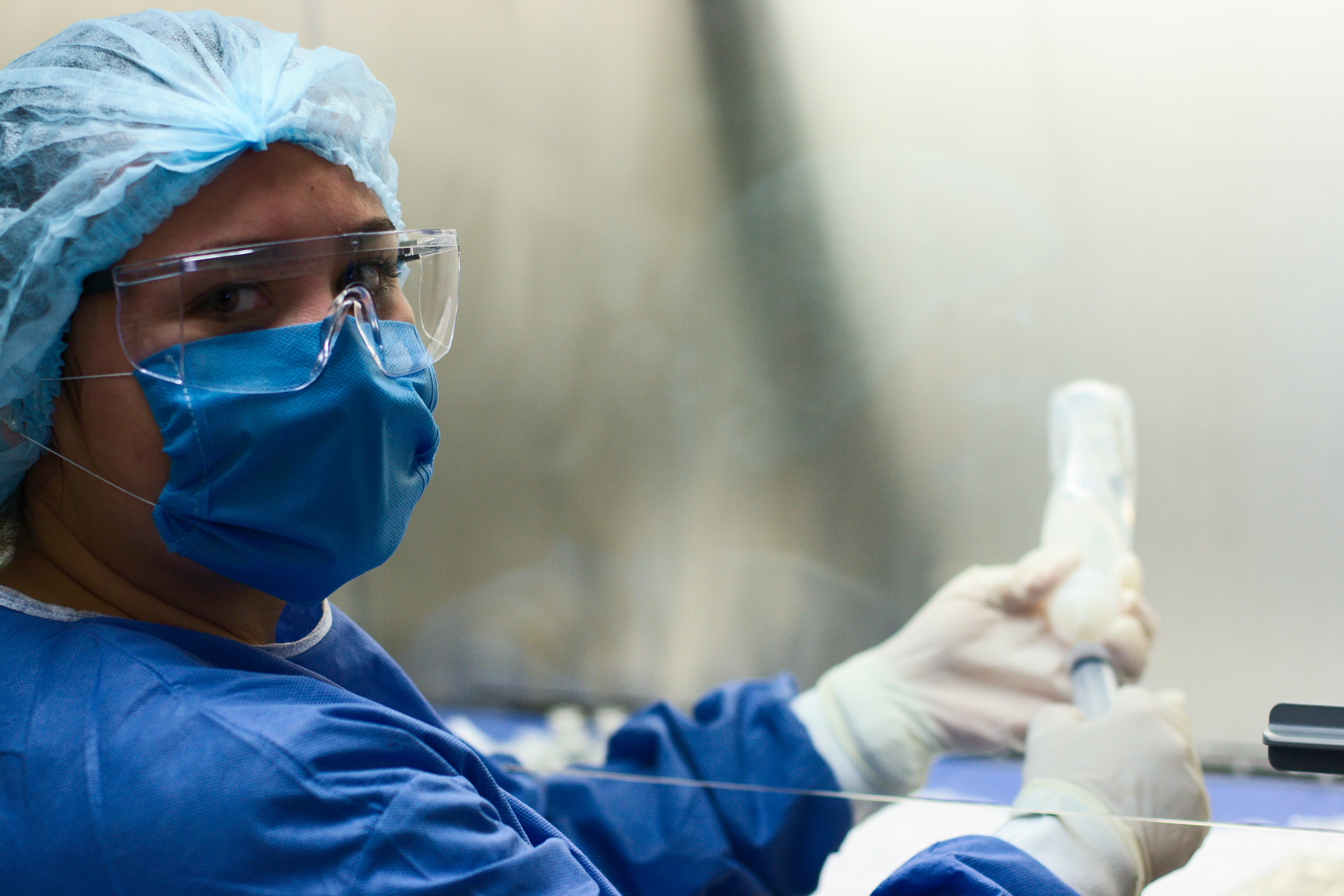
This nurse is well protected against occupational hazards of exposure to chemotherapy agents: she is using a laminar flow cabinet, wearing gown, gloves, goggles and long sleeves.

An oncology nurse is a specialized nurse who cares for the diagnosis, treatment, and recovery of cancer patients. Oncology nursing care can be defined as meeting the various needs of oncology patients during the time of their disease including appropriate screenings and other preventive practices, symptom management, care to retain as much normal functioning as possible, and supportive measures upon end of life. The nurse needs to be able to advocate for the patient, educate the patient on their condition and treatment, and communicate effectively with the patient, family members and healthcare team. A BSN or an ADN is required to become an Oncology Nurse along with passing the NCLEX exam. Then, The Oncology Certified Nurse Board exam is an exam taken after 1,000 hours of experience and 10 contact hours in Oncology to ensure clinical expertise in Oncology.

== Certification ==
=== United States ===
The Oncology Nursing Certification Corporation (ONCC) offers several different options for board certification in oncological nursing. Certification is a voluntary process and ensures that a nurse has proper qualifications and knowledge of a specialty area and has kept up-to-date in his or her education.

The ONCC offers eight options for certification:

- Basic:
  - OCN: Oncology Certified Nurse
  - CPON: Certified Pediatric Oncology Nurse
  - CPHON: Certified Pediatric Hematology Oncology Nurse
- Specialty:
  - BMTCN: Blood and Marrow Transplant Certified Nurse
  - CBCN: Certified Breast Care Nurse
- Advanced:
  - AOCN: Advanced Oncology Certified Nurse
  - AOCNP: Advanced Oncology Certified Nurse Practitioner
  - AOCNS: Advanced Oncology Certified Clinical Nurse Specialist

Certification is granted for four years, after which it must be renewed by taking a recertification test or by earning a certain number of continuing education credits.

To become certified, nurses must have an RN license, meet specific eligibility criteria for nursing experience and specialty practice, and must pass a multiple-choice test.

For the advanced AOCNP and AOCNS certifications, a nurse must have a master's degree or higher in nursing and a minimum of 500 hours of supervised clinical practice of oncology nursing. The AOCNP certification also requires successful completion of an accredited nurse practitioner program.

=== Chemotherapy ===
Oncology nurses must have appropriate training in the administration, handling, side effects, and dosing of chemotherapy. Each institution will have its own policies for various chemotherapy drugs to ensure adequate training and for prevention of errors. The Oncology Nursing Society (ONS) and Oncology Nursing Certification Corporation (ONCC) offer a Chemotherapy/Biotherapy training course available to any oncology nurse to ensure the safe administration and management of side effects of chemotherapy and biotherapy agents. This course consists of 16 contact hours. This certification needs to be renewed after two years. It's a common misconception that an RN must need advanced training to administer chemotherapy to patients. Instead, there is chemotherapy validation such as getting certified to ensure the safety of the patients.

== Work settings ==
Oncology nurses, like any Registered Nurse have a large variety of settings they can work in. Oncology nurses can work inpatient settings such as hospitals, outpatient settings, in hospice services, or in physician offices. There are a variety of specialties such as radiation, surgery, pediatric, or gynecologic. In hospitals, the Oncology Nurse assists with treatments, operations, and monitoring patients progress. In standalone facilities, the nurse updates the patients health records, educates, and prepares them for discharge. An Oncology Nurse in a hospice setting prepares patients who are terminally ill for end of life.

== Roles ==
=== Advocacy ===
Oncology Nurse's advocates for patients who are diagnosed with cancer. The nurse is the communication between the patient and the healthcare team. Patients rely on nurses to support their autonomy and look after the patient when they can't look after themselves. They need to be able to recognize the patients unspoken concerns and represent them. It's important the patient feel comfortable with the nurse to communicate their thoughts and feelings and that the nurse can effectively communicate concerns to the healthcare team. The nurse also advocates for the patient by protecting their rights, educating them, and proving compassion and patient-cantered care.

=== Education ===
The nurse must also educate the patient on their condition, its side effects, its treatment plan, and how to prevent possible complications. This education should be done effectively throughout the treatment of the disease, according to the teaching style that best suits the particular patient. According to the Oncology Nursing Standards, the patient or caregivers for the patient should understand the state of the disease and the therapy used at their education level, understand the therapy schedule and when it is being used, be involved in decisions regarding their own care, and state interventions for serious side effects and complications of the disease and intervention.

=== Communication ===
The nurse translates information from the healthcare team to make sure the patient is informed and involved in their healthcare decisions. The Oncology Nurse collaborates with Oncologists, Physiologists, Dietician's, Palliative Care Specialists, Pharmacists, etc. to ensure the patient is getting the most appropriate care.

=== Treatment ===
Nurses must be able to manage the many side effects associated with cancer and the treatment. Nurses must have extensive knowledge of pharmacological and nonpharmacological nursing interventions, and when they are appropriate to use.
