= List of air shows in Japan =

This is a list of air shows in Japan. Air shows in Japan are mostly those held at Japan Air Self-Defense Force and US military bases across the country. Air shows are sometimes known as festivals in Japan.

The Japan Air Self-Defense Force, (JASDF) Japan Ground Self-Defense Force (JGSDF) and Japan Maritime Self-Defense Force (MSDF) all have air shows at their bases. Air shows or open days are also held at a number of US military bases in Japan. At JASDF base air shows it is common for the Blue Impulse aerobatic team to perform.

The US Air Force, US Marine Corps, and US Navy also have events at their bases. Visitors who are not from the US or Japan may be turned away from a US base for security reasons. Prospective attendees of events at US bases who are neither Japanese or American should bring identification and also consult the Third Country National list to see if they require special approval to enter the base.

Individual event dates can vary or be cancelled during different years. The months given below are the 2016 months. For current dates see here.

== JASDF ==
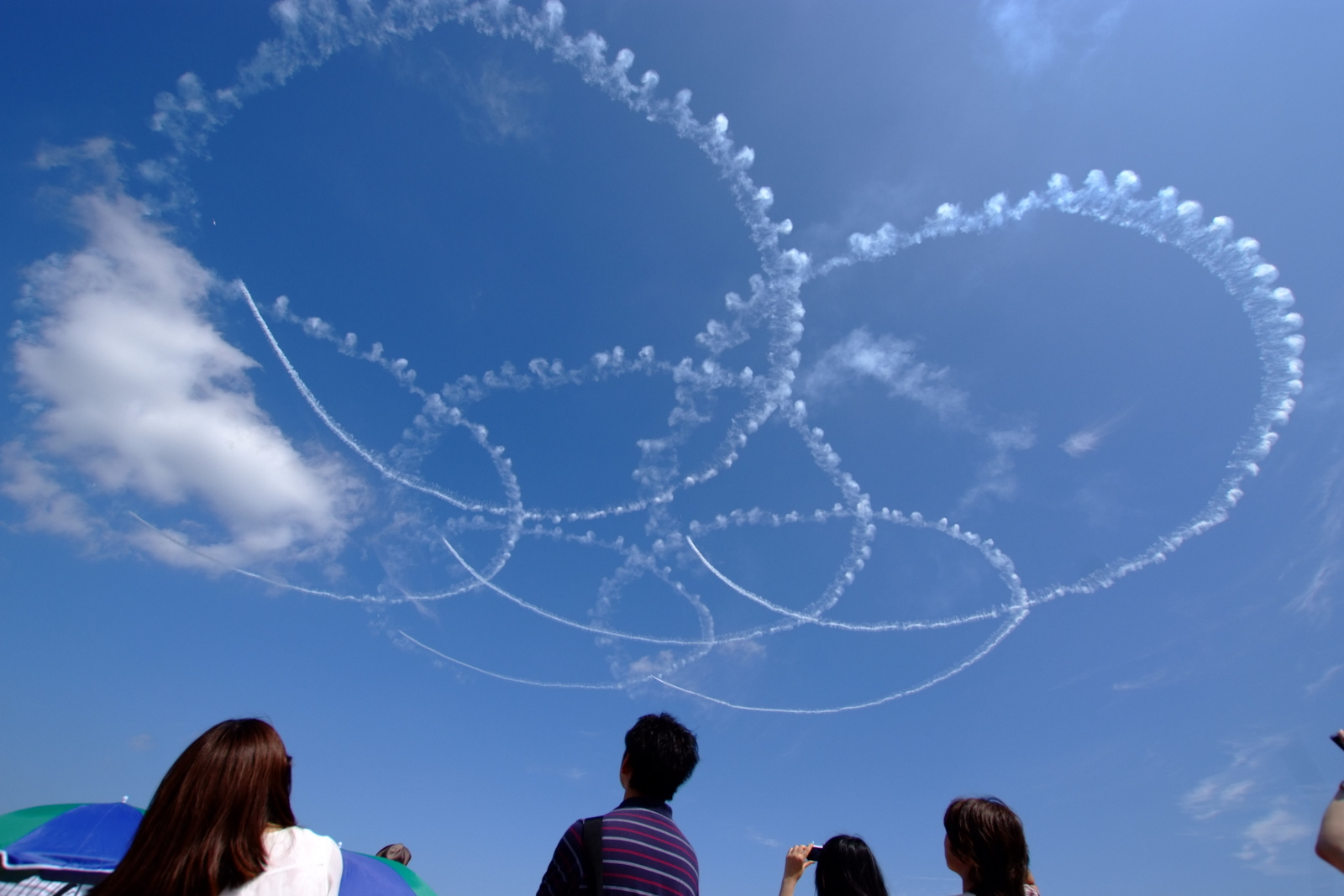
Olympic Rings display at Chitose Air Show 2013

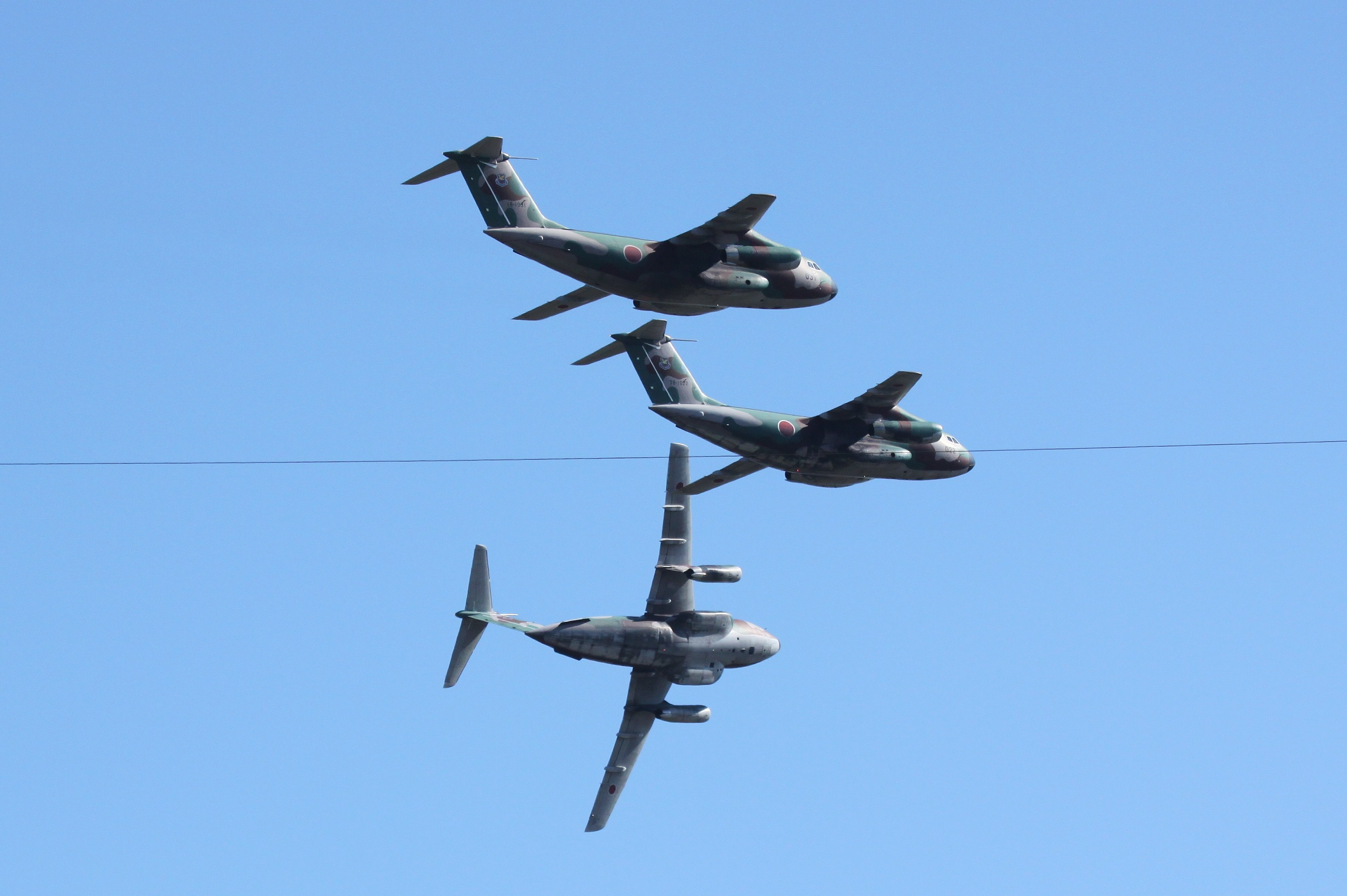
JASDF Kawasaki C-1 aircraft at the 2010 Iruma Air Show

- March - Komaki Air Show
- April - Kumagaya Air Show
- May - Hofu-Kita Air Show
- May - Miho Air Show
- July - Chitose Air Show
- September - Misawa Air Show (also a US Air Force base)
- September - Komatsu Air Show
- September - Akita Air Show
- September - Shizuhama Air Show
- October - Ashiya Air Show
- October - Hamamatsu Air Show
- October - Gifu Air Show
- November 3 Culture Day - Iruma Air Show
- November - Kasuga Air Show
- November - Hyakuri Air Show
- November - Tsuiki Air Show
- December - Nyutabaru Air Show
- December - Naha Air Show (also a US Air Force base)

== JGSDF ==
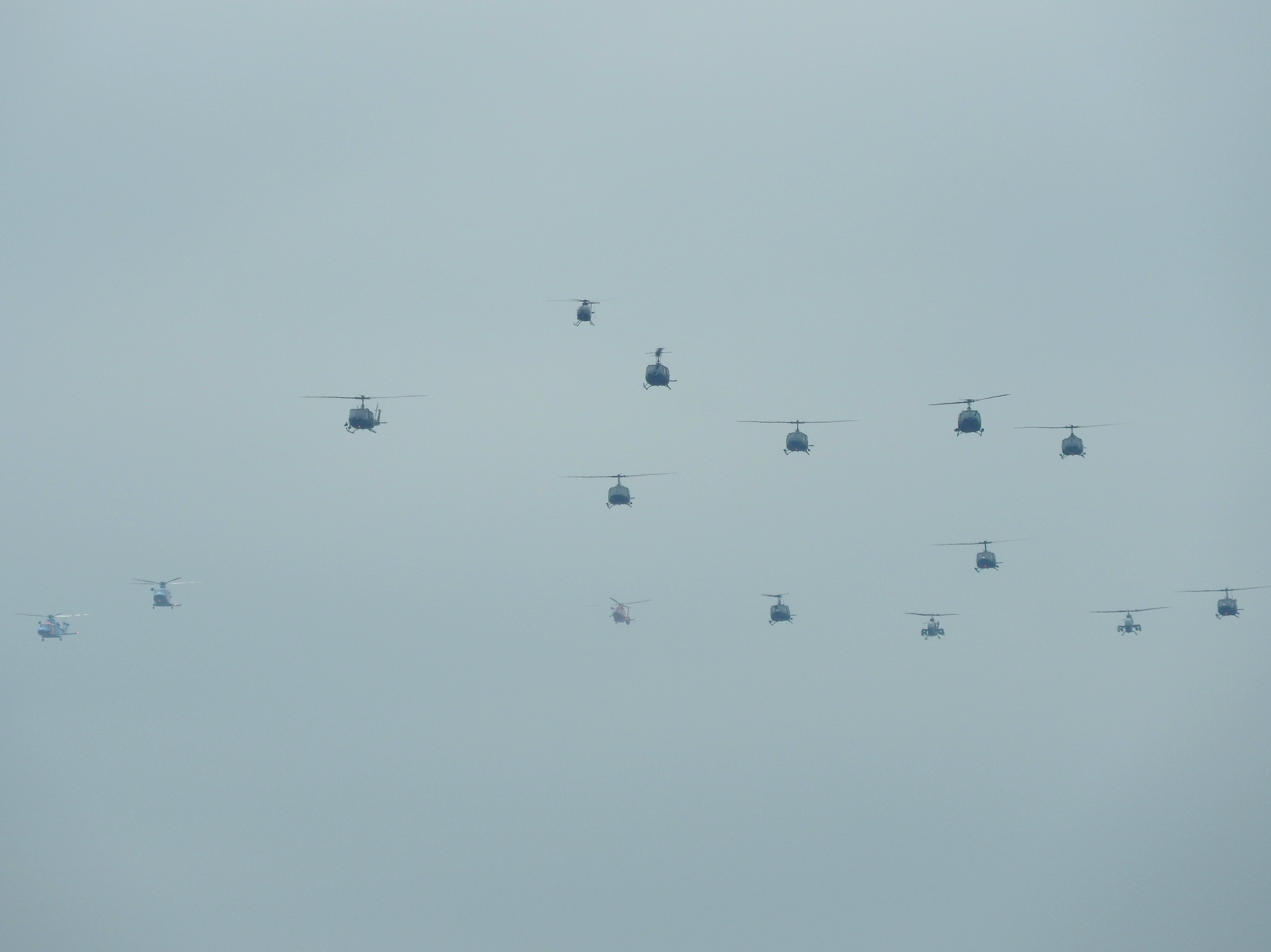
Mass helicopter formation at the 2016 Tachikawa Air Show

- April - Somagahara Air Show
- April - Takayubaru Air Show
- April - Metabaru Air Show
- April - Kasuminome Air Show
- April - Hachinohe Air Show
- April - Narashino Air Show
- June - Kasumigaura Air Show
- June - Asahikawa Air Show
- June - Kita-Utsunomiya Air Show
- June - Okadama Air Show
- September - Obihiro Air Show
- October - Tachikawa Air Show (also heliport for the Tokyo Fire Department and Tokyo Metropolitan Police Department)
- October - Akeno Air Show
- October - Yao Air Show
- October - Naha Air Show

== JMSDF ==
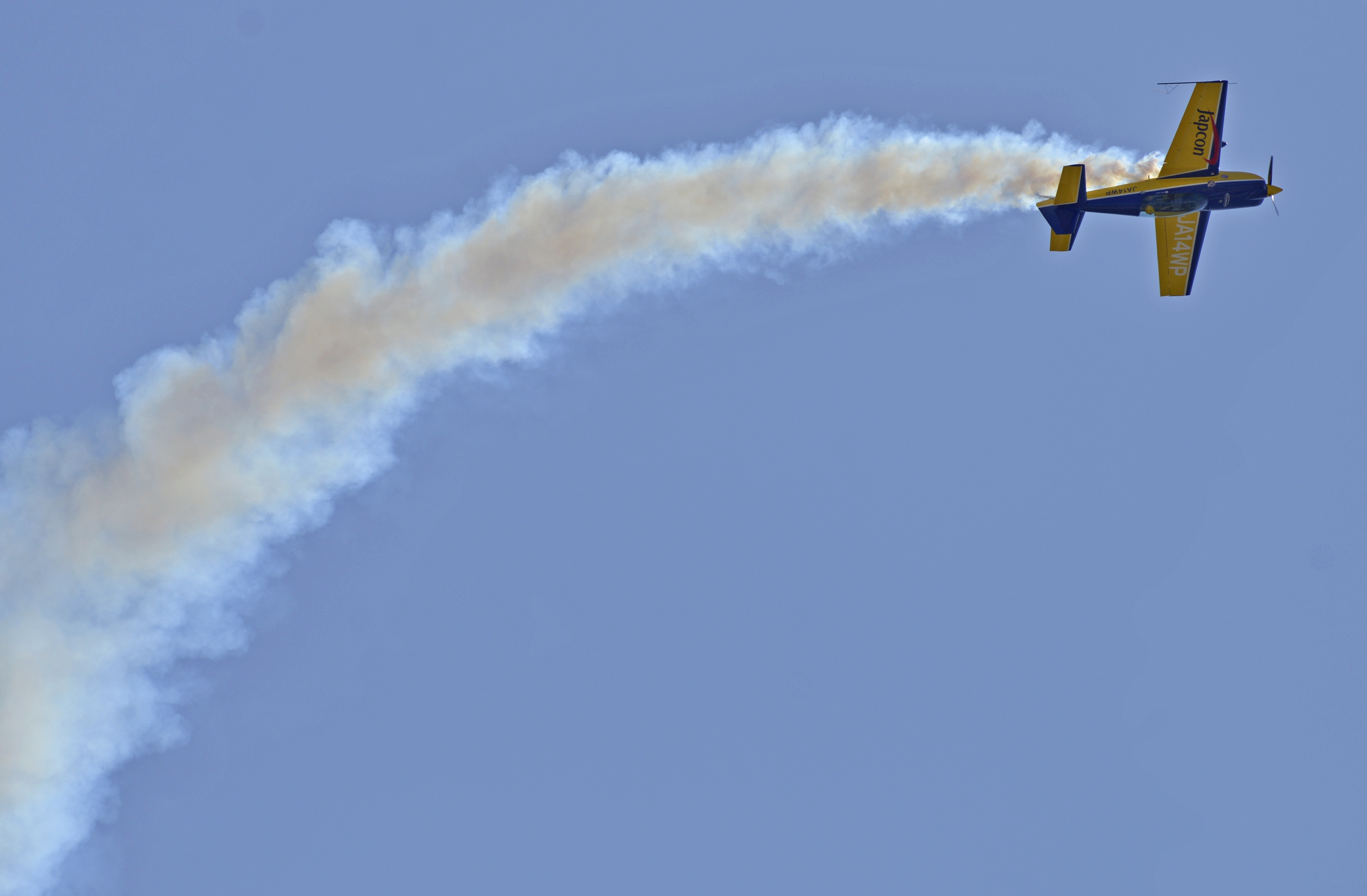
Air display at the 2017 Iwakuni air show

- April - Kanoya Air Show
- April - Atsugi Air Show (also a US Navy base)
- May - Iwakuni Air Show (also a US Marine Corps base)
- May - Omura Air Show
- June - Ohminato Air Show
- July - Maizuru Air Show
- July - Komatsushima Air Show
- July - Kobe-Hanshin Air Show
- July - Tateyama Air Show
- September - Hachinohe Air Show
- September - Tokushima Air Show
- October - Ozuki Air Show (“Swell Festival”)
- October - Shimofusa Air Show

== US Air Force ==
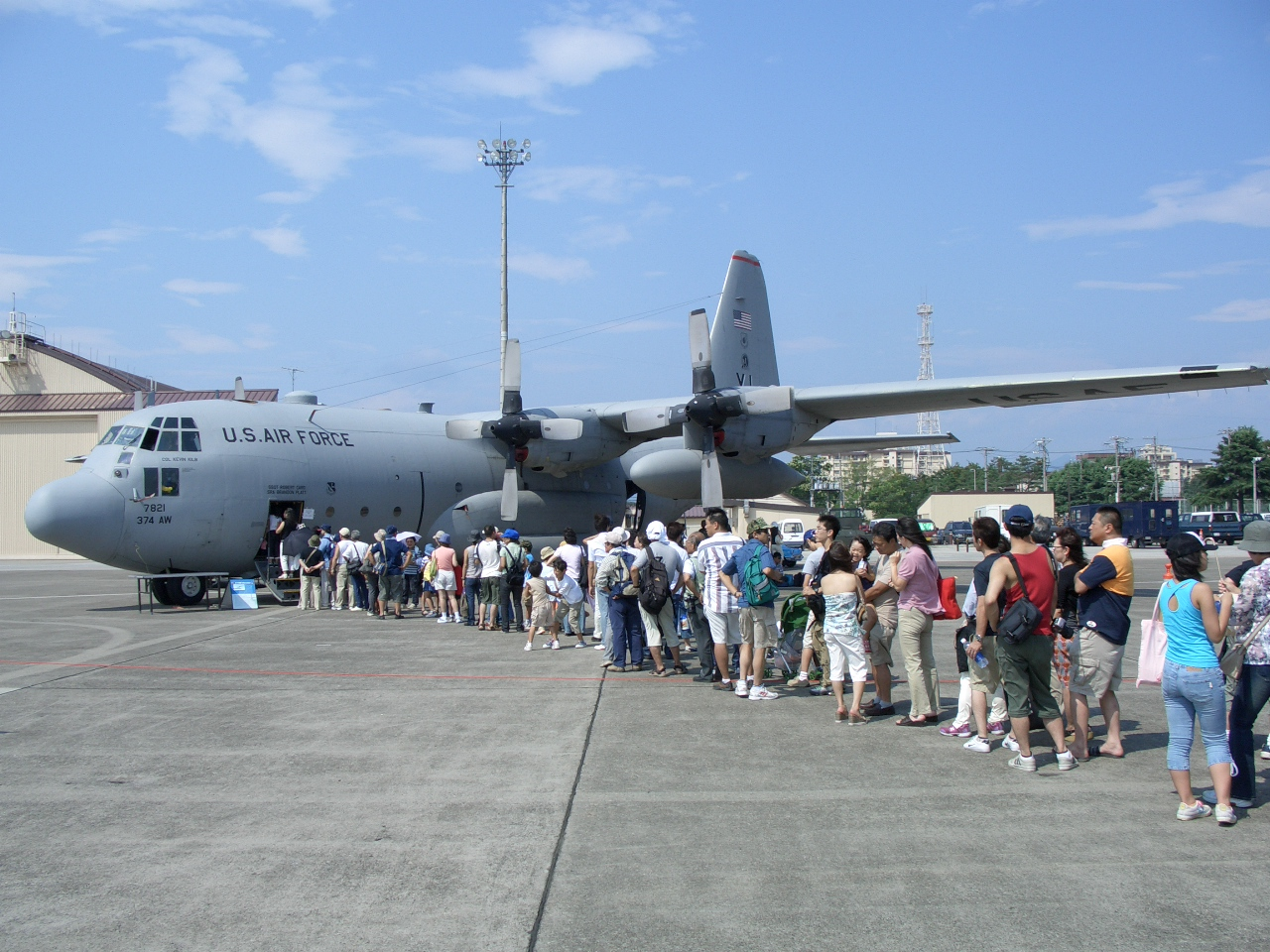
Lockheed C-130 Hercules at Yokota Friendship Festival 2005

- September - Yokota Air Base friendship festival
- September - Misawa Air Show (also a JASDF base)
- December - Naha Air Show (also a JASDF base)

== US Marine Corps ==
- May - Iwakuni Air Show (also a JMSDF base)

== US Navy ==
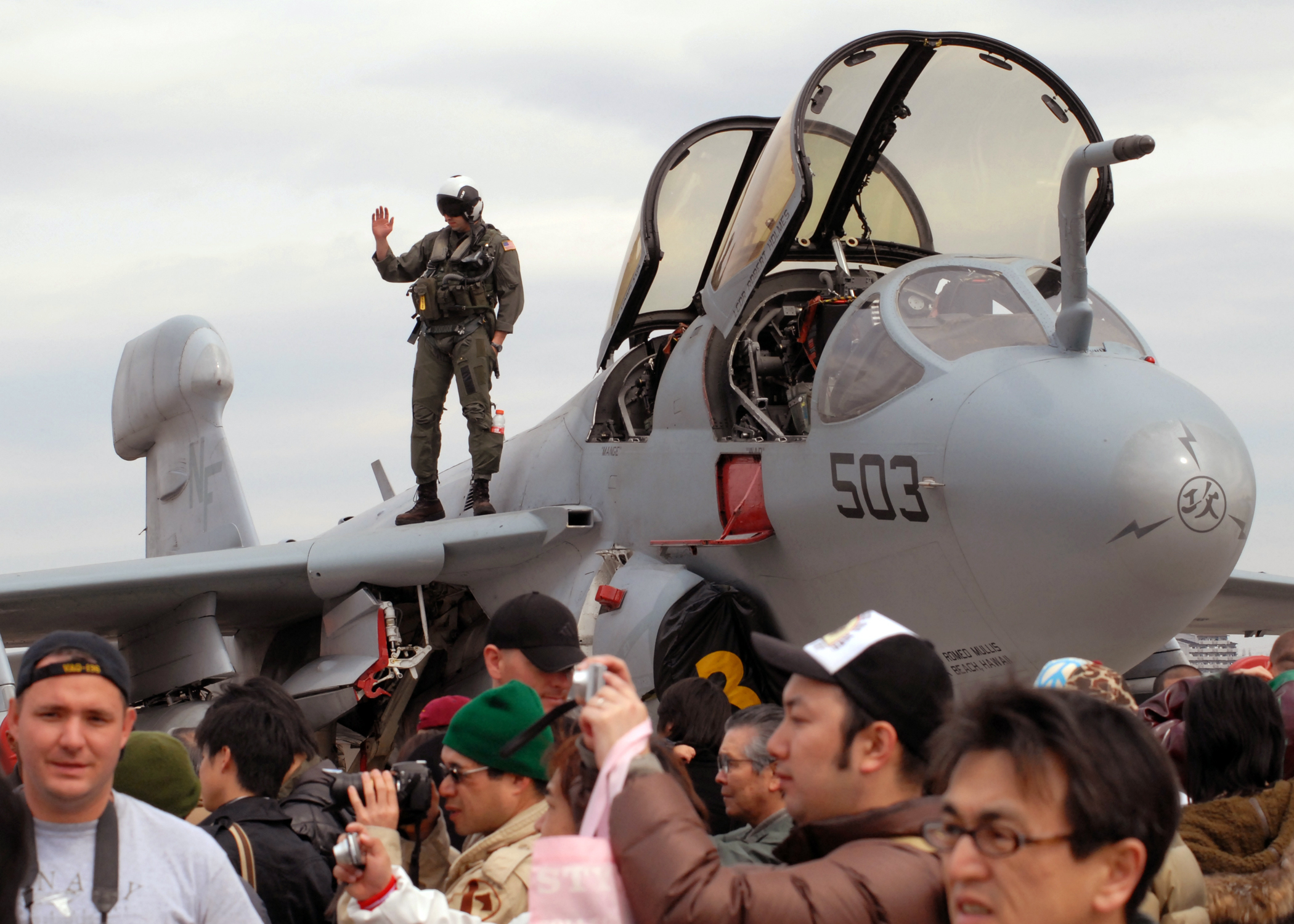
EA-6B Prowler at the 2009 Atsugi Friendship Day

- April - Atsugi Air Show (also a JMSDF base)

== Other ==
- November - Fly Again Tsuchiura
