= St. Michael's Cathedral, Kobe =

Coordinates: 34°41′27″N 135°10′56″E

St. Michael's Cathedral, located in Chūō-ku, Kobe, Japan, is the cathedral church of the Kobe Diocese of the Anglican Church in Japan, covering the Anglican/Episcopal parishes in Hyogo Prefecture of the Kansai Region, the six prefectures of the Chugoku Region, and the four prefectures of the Shikoku Region.

== History ==
The history of St. Michael's Cathedral in Kobe began in 1876, when H.J. Foss of the Church of England came to Japan as a missionary, and established a mission station in Koikawasuji, Chuo Ward, Kobe City. He laid the corner stone of the church in 1881, and named it St. Michael's Church.

He was followed by the Reverends Gardner, Toru Tsujii, Hisakichi Yamabe, Ketterwell, Soroku Takeuchi, etc. From 1931 for 40 years, the priest was replaced by Rev. Hinsuke Yashiro (later third bishop of the Diocese of Kobe), and from 1971 Rev. Kinichi Yashiro (later the eighth Bishop of the Diocese of Kobe) was the rectors. Subsequent rectors have been Yoshitaka Akiyama (1993-), Yutaka Nakamura (1999- ), Shuichi Haga (2005- ), Nobuyuki Uehara (2010- ), and Koichi Seyama (2016- ).

The first church building was destroyed by fire in 1891, and a new building was built at Nakayamate-dori 6-chome, but it was destroyed in the Kobe air raid of 1945. In 1959, St. Michael's Church, the cathedral of the Diocese of Kobe, was newly built at its current location (5-11-1 Shimoyamate-dori, Chuo-ku), and its consecration was done during the 100th anniversary of the mission of the Anglican Church in Japan. This ceremony was attended by Geoffrey Fisher, the 99th Archbishop of Canterbury.

== Related facilities ==
The church-related facilities include St. Michael's Nursery School and the special nursing home, Olympia.

== English-language worship ==
The English-language worship service, conducted by a priest assigned to the Seafarers' center in Kobe. Currently (January, 2024), the center is being renovated and the worship is held at St. Michael's International School. The other two English-language services in the Anglican Church in Japan are held at St. Alban's Church, Tokyo, and Christ Church, Yokohama.

== Seafarers' center ==
The Kobe center of the Mission to Seafarers is located near St. Michael's Church.

== See also ==
- Nippon Sei Ko Kai
