= Negishi Racecourse =

Racecourse

Coordinates: 35.4244°N 139.6362°E

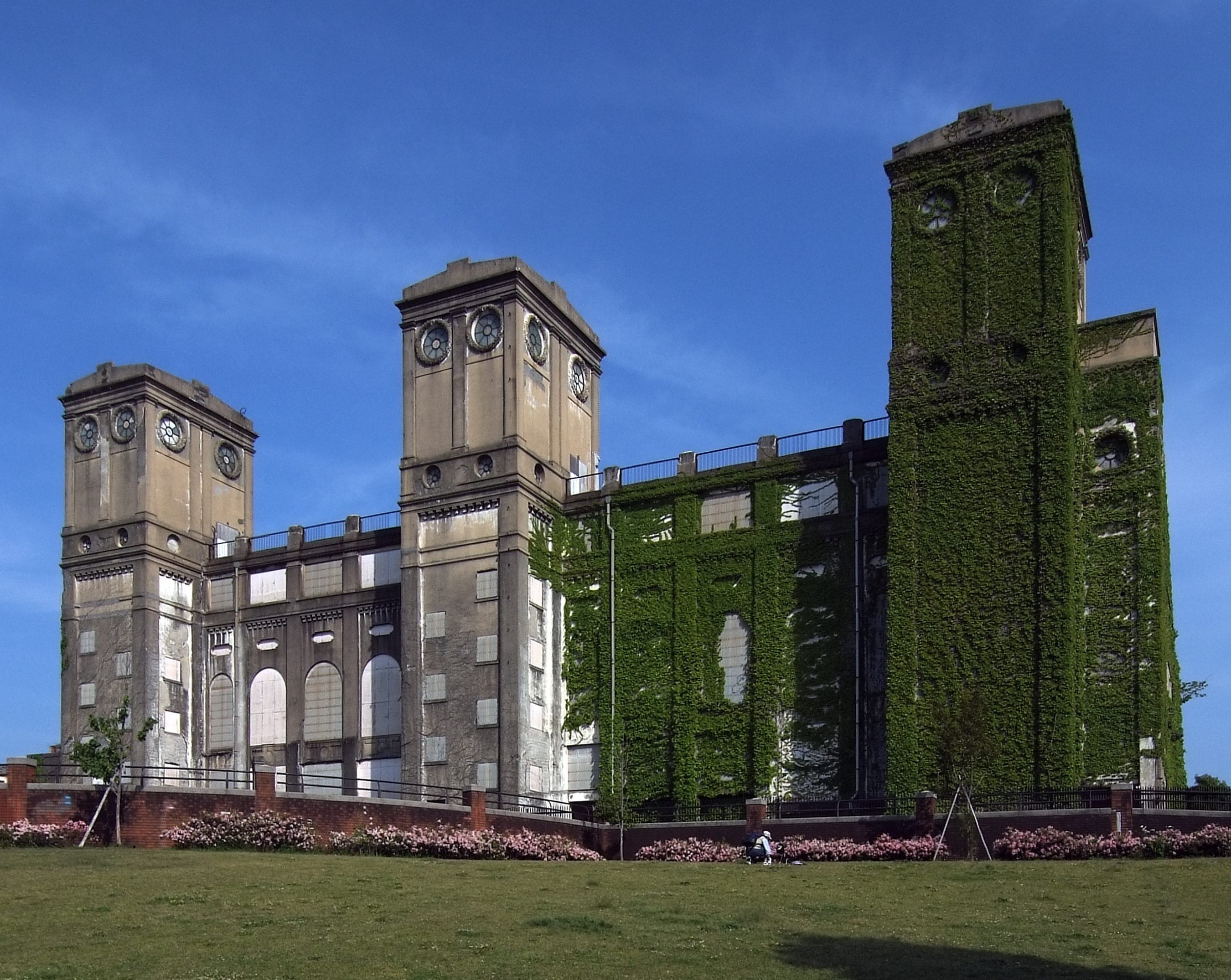
- First-class Grandstand at the Negishi Racecourse (Heritage of Industrial Modernization in Japan)
- Interactive map of Negishi Racecourse
- Location: Yamate, Yokohama, Japan
- Owned by: Defunct
- Date opened: 1866
- Date closed: 1942
- Course type: Flat

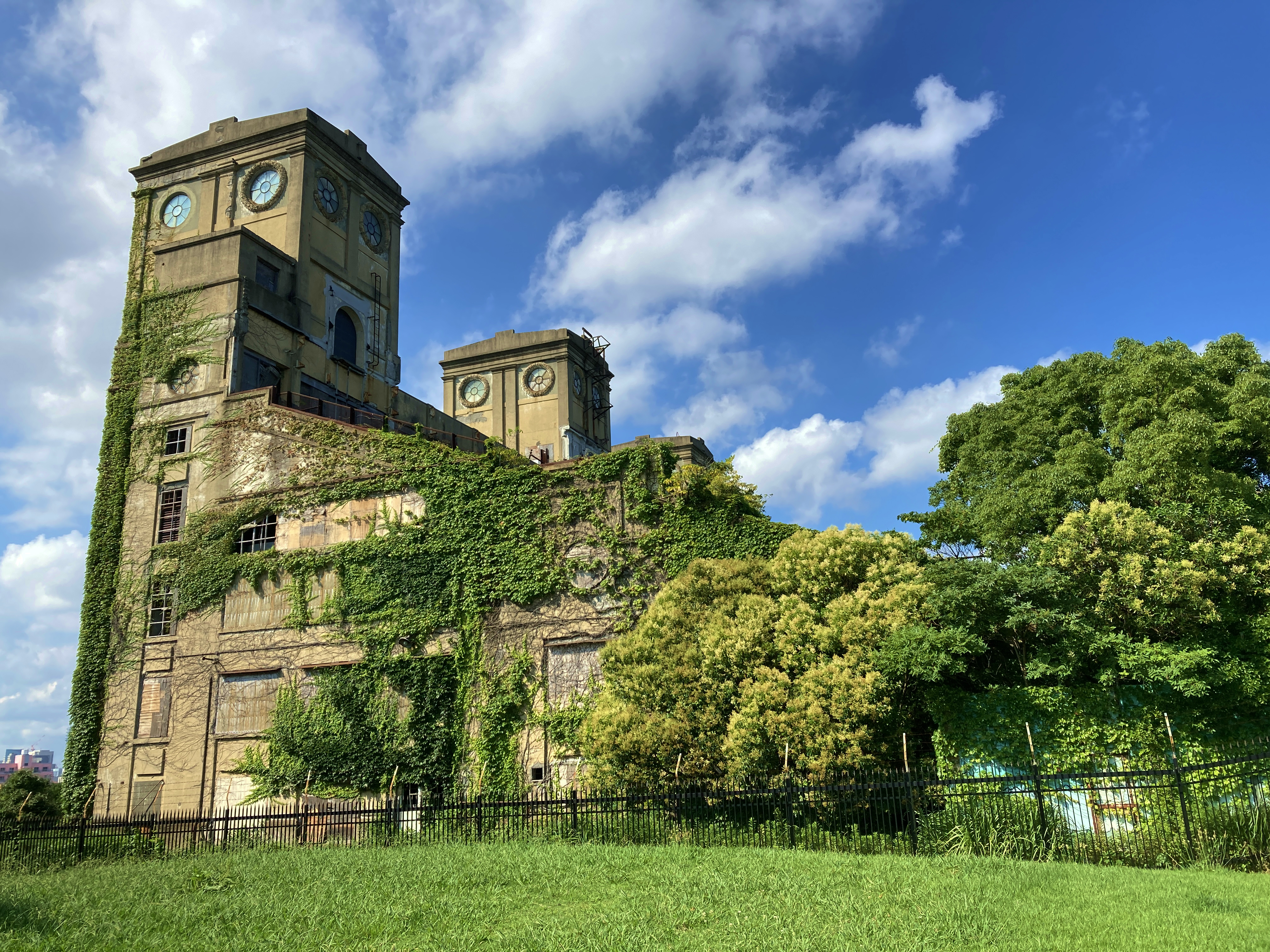
Site of Viewing stand south of First-class Grandstand

Negishi Racecourse was a horse-racing facility located on the outskirts of Yamate in the treaty port of Yokohama, recognized as the first purpose-built European style racecourse in Japan. The course was operational between 1866 and 1942. It had a major influence on racecourses built later all over Japan, such as its clockwise circuit course and the structure of the stands.

== Overview ==
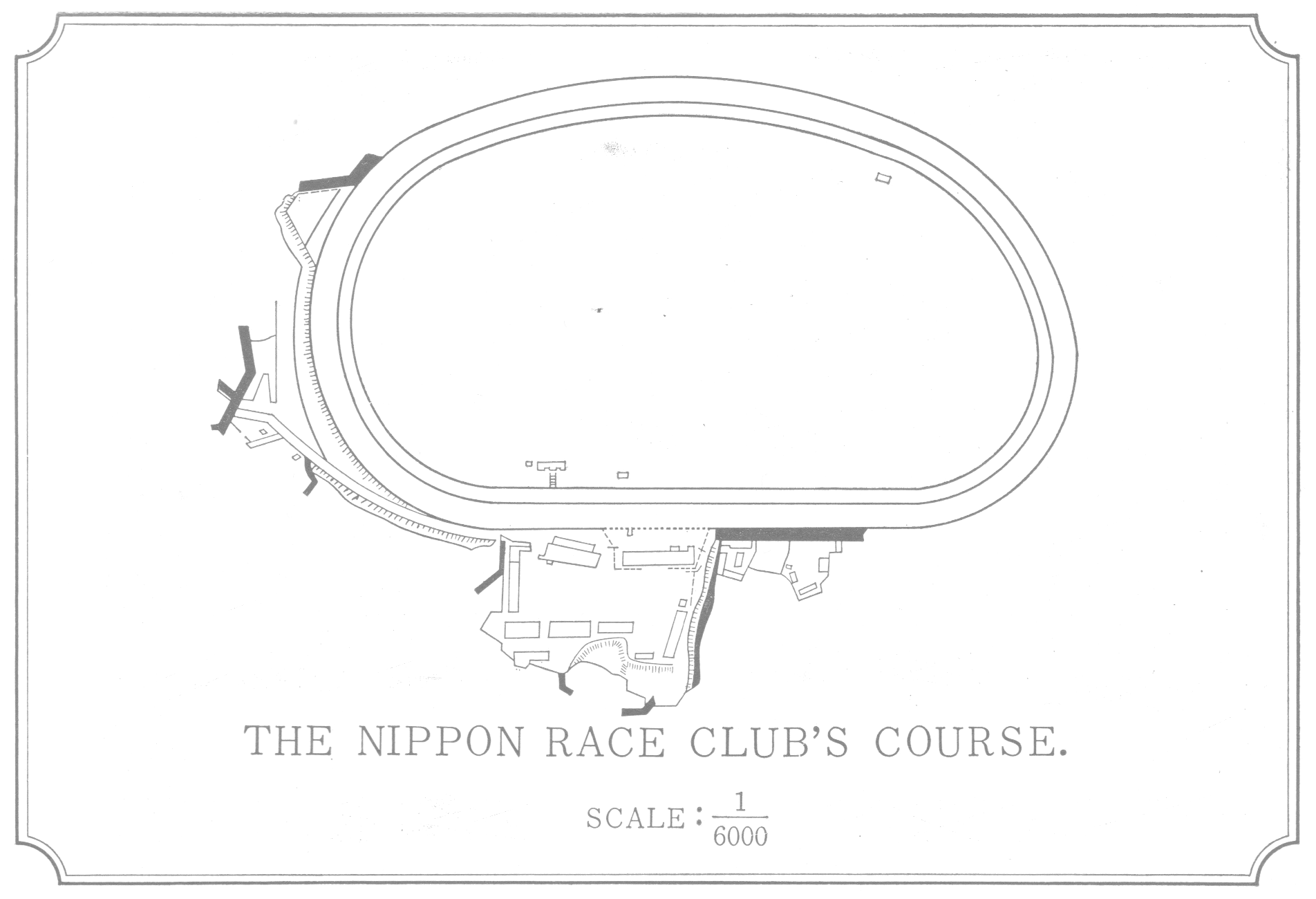
Negishi Racecourse Layout（1911-1912）

The track is a right-handed turf course with a circumference of 1,764 metres and a width of 28.8 metres. As of 1937, the circumference was 1,632 metres and the width ranged from 15 metres to 26.5 metres; these dimensions were substantial, rivaling those of modern racecourses used for Japan Racing Association events.

The decision to adopt a right-handed layout is attributed to two main factors: the Tokugawa Shogunate's financial constraints at the time, which precluded significant land-leveling costs; and the local topography, where a left-handed layout would have resulted in an uphill slope before the finish line, thereby preventing the kind of close, neck-and-neck finishes that generate excitement. Furthermore, because Negishi Racecourse adopted a right-handed course, many racecourses subsequently built across Japan followed its example; this led to a distinct evolutionary path for Japanese racing, differing from the left-handed courses common in many other countries.

A straight section exists only on the grandstand side (the home stretch), while the backstretch follows a gentle curve.

== The Main Stand ==
The main stand, in use since 1889, was damaged by fire in 1911; it underwent major repairs and was replaced by a three-story wooden structure, but this was partially destroyed in the Great Kantō earthquake of 1923. Although horse racing resumed the following spring using a makeshift shack, the construction of a new stand became an urgent priority.

When planning the construction of a new grandstand, States Isaacs, the manager of Negishi Racecourse, commissioned Jay Morgan—a chief architect with the American firm George A. Fuller Company who had come to Japan in 1920 to work on the Marunouchi Building in Tokyo—to design the structure. The previous grandstand had been a simple wooden box-like building with limited seating capacity and numerous pillars that obstructed views of crucial race moments; consequently, Isaacs stipulated that the new design must offer high seismic resistance, dignified aesthetics, and a functional layout that provided clear sightlines to the corners of the track. Drawing on his experience from the Great Kanto Earthquake, Morgan proposed a structural design that minimized roof weight, successfully reducing the number of internal support pillars and thereby ensuring an unobstructed view of the entire course from the spectator seating.

The Nippon Race Club began renovating its grandstand on May 19, 1929, following the conclusion of the spring race meeting; by November 2, the first-class stand (with a capacity of 4,500) was approximately 80% complete, and racing was held there. The second-class stand (capacity: 6,000) was finished the following year, and in 1932, a glass-roofed canopy was added. By extending this large canopy outward, the club was able to remove the front wall, creating a more open structure.

In 1934, a second-class viewing stand was added to accommodate a rapidly increasing number of spectators, doubling the total capacity to 12,000 people. The grandstand was a seven-story, one-basement structure built of steel-reinforced concrete with a total floor area of 7,700 square meters; it featured three elevators—a rarity at the time—and was equipped with 70 betting windows each for first- and second-class areas, as well as 28 payout windows for first-class and 35 for second-class. A VIP room was located in the center of the top floor of the first-class stand; its spacious interior blended Japanese and Western styles, featuring a high coffered ceiling where each panel was adorned with a dignified phoenix painting. Admission to the first-class stand required formal attire (whether Japanese or Western). Thanks to their luxurious facilities and superb views—including sights of the harbor and Mount Fuji—these stands were hailed as the finest in the Orient and served as a model for racecourses subsequently built across the country.

== History ==
=== Japan’s Opening to the World and the Beginnings of Modern Horse Racing ===
In 1853, the U.S. Navy’s East India Squadron, led by Commodore Matthew Calbraith Perry, arrived in Edo Bay off the coast of Uraga (present-day Yokosuka City, Kanagawa Prefecture) to demand that Japan open its doors to the outside world; this led to the conclusion of the Treaty of Peace and Amity between the United States and Japan with the Tokugawa Shogunate the following year. Subsequently, the Port of Yokohama was opened in 1859 under the Ansei Treaties—a series of five agreements, including the Treaty of Amity and Commerce signed with the United States in 1858.

Although the treaty-designated open port was originally intended to be Kanagawa—a post station on the Tokaido (located in the area spanning present-day Kanagawa-honcho to Aoki-cho in Kanagawa Ward, Yokohama)—Yokohama was selected instead, despite being little more than a small fishing village at the time. This choice is attributed to the Tokugawa Shogunate's desire to avoid clashes between foreigners and anti-foreign factions; consequently, the authorities developed the Yokohama area—situated somewhat apart from the heavily trafficked Tokaido—as an alternative site. Thus, a foreign settlement was established in Yokohama; areas such as the Kannai Settlement (present-day Yamashita-cho), Yokohama Shinden (present-day Yokohama Chinatown), and Otaya Shinden (near the former Yokohama City Hall and Yokohama Stadium, as they existed until 2020) were reclaimed and incorporated into the settlement, which was subsequently developed and expanded into an urban district.

Foreigners who arrived in Japan after the opening of the ports introduced various aspects of Western culture to the country. Among these was a Western-style equestrian culture, which included horse racing. These individuals enjoyed horse racing and horseback riding as part of their daily leisure activities. They were passionate about horse racing and strongly desired to continue enjoying the sport—as well as riding—in Japan, just as they had in their home countries. They also wished to introduce the sport they loved to the Japanese people. Western-style horse racing began to take place in Yokohama; records indicate that the earliest race was held on September 1, 1860—the year following the port's opening—in Motomachi (located in present-day Motomachi, Naka Ward, Yokohama).

Subsequently, in 1862 (the second year of the Bunkyū era), a temporary circular racetrack—measuring 1,200 meters in circumference and 11 meters in width—was constructed at Yokohama Shinden, and horse racing began there that spring. This facility is considered the prototype for modern (Western-style) horse racing in Japan. However, as the population of foreign residents grew, the temporary track was closed and the land was converted into a residential area. Although racing continued at various temporary sites thereafter, the issue of a racetrack had become a diplomatic matter as early as the end of the Edo period, driven by mounting calls from foreign residents for the construction of a permanent facility.

=== The Namamugi Incident and the Opening of the Negishi Racecourse ===
Japan's opening to the outside world had plunged the country into a turbulent era, marked by the intensification of the Sonnō jōi (Revere the Emperor, Expel the Barbarians) movement. Amidst this climate, the Namamugi Incident occurred in 1862, in which Satsuma samurai killed and wounded British nationals who had ridden their horses across the path of a procession led by Shimazu Hisamitsu, the father of the Satsuma domain's lord. This incident sparked a growing desire among foreign residents to hold horse races in a safe, secluded location. Concurrently, as tensions with foreign nations mounted, negotiations between the Tokugawa shogunate and the foreign community ensued; these culminated in 1864 with the signing of the "Memorandum on the Yokohama Foreign Settlement" by the Shogunate and four nations—United Kingdom, the United States, France, and the Netherlands—aimed at improving and developing the Yokohama foreign settlement.

However, the terms were disadvantageous to the Shogunate, including a provision to incorporate the waterfront street of the Japanese settlement into the foreign settlement. The memorandum stipulated that, as part of the reparations for the Namamugi Incident, a marshland area behind the settlement (near present-day Ogi-cho and Matsukage-cho in Naka Ward) would be reclaimed at the Shogunate's expense to build a racecourse, with its operation entrusted to a committee of foreign residents. Although the Shogunate had been negotiating revisions, matters accelerated rapidly following the "Butaya Fire" (Pigsty Fire) of 1866. Ministers from four nations agreed to annul Article 1 of the Yokohama Settlement Memorandum on the condition that a racecourse be built—at the Shogunate's expense—at Negishi, located on a hill away from the Tokaido road, with a land lease rate of 10 dollars per 100 tsubo (approximately 330 square meters). Consequently, Japan's first Western-style racecourse, the Negishi Racecourse, was opened that same year—designed and supervised by officers from the British garrison—and horse racing began there the following year, in 1867.

Initially, the races were organized by the "Yokohama Race Club", founded by resident foreigners (primarily the British). However, the club faced a crisis due to internal discord, financial difficulties stemming from the economic decline of the foreign settlement, and challenges in securing Japanese-bred horses. Unable to pay rent by 1880, they terminated their lease agreement and established "The Nippon Race Club", opening membership—previously restricted to resident foreigners—to Japanese nationals as well. This move resulted from an alignment of interests: the Meiji government sought to use the racecourse as a venue to showcase its Westernization policies, while the original club sought a more robust financial foundation. The newly formed Nippon Race Club counted members of the Imperial family among its honorary members, while key Meiji government figures—such as Saigō Tsugumichi, Matsukata Masayoshi, and Itō Hirobumi—became full members, owning racehorses and participating in the races.

=== The Role Played by Negishi Racecourse ===
Even after the Japan Race Club took over the organization of race meetings at Negishi Racecourse, the venue continued to face financial difficulties. In addition to a global economic downturn, the domestic economy was contracting due to the "Matsukata Deflation"—a policy of fiscal austerity implemented by Matsukata, the first Minister of Finance, to restore the nation's finances. In 1884, the "General Rules for the Sale of Government-Operated Factories" were enacted; as costly state-run enterprises were successively transferred to the private sector, government support for the Kyodo Keiba Kaisha (Joint Horse Racing Company) was also halted. Consequently, government funding for a single Negishi race meeting dropped to less than one-tenth of its previous level, and starting in 1885, the Army Ministry, the Ministry of Agriculture and Commerce, and the Ministry of Foreign Affairs ceased financial contributions, such as the donation of prize money. The Army removed horse breeding from the jurisdiction of the in 1884 and temporarily abolished the Military Horse Bureau in 1886. Meanwhile, the Ministry of Agriculture and Commerce transferred the Shimosa Livestock Breeding Station—a primary source of racehorses—to the Ministry of the Imperial Household (now the Imperial Household Agency) in 1885. These developments led to the withdrawal of horses entered by the Army and the Ministry of Agriculture and Commerce, resulting in a sharp decline in the number of crossbred racehorses competing at the Negishi race meeting that autumn.

Meanwhile, the Negishi Racecourse was closely linked to the Meiji government's diplomatic policies—specifically the revision of unequal treaties—in a manner associated with "Rokumeikan diplomacy." Consequently, Emperor Meiji visited the course sixteen times between 1881 and 1899, and the venue served as a social hub where key figures from politics and business gathered. In 1880, the "Mikado's Vase" race was inaugurated, featuring a vase bestowed by the Emperor; this event evolved into "The Emperor's Cup" (later known as the Teishitsu Goshōten, or Imperial Household Prize Race) in 1905, serving as the precursor to the modern Tenno Sho.

While horse racing was recognized in Japan at the time as an important social activity, the importance and urgency of improving horse breeds were not fully appreciated. However, the "Matsukata Deflation" policies led to a contraction in regional horse breeding, resulting in a critical shortage of horses. Furthermore, a conflict between the Ministry of Agriculture and Commerce and the Ministry of War regarding horse administration policy dampened the enthusiasm of foreign residents for horse racing; by around 1887, the very survival of the sport was in jeopardy.

In the era of imperialism that followed the achievement of the initial goal—the revision of unequal treaties—military horses played a pivotal role, and the quality of these horses was directly linked to the strength of the army. Japan faced significant challenges in this regard: its limited, mountainous terrain made it difficult to secure a sufficient number of horses, and its capabilities for taming and training were inadequate, resulting in military horses that were vastly inferior in performance to their European counterparts. Furthermore, because agricultural horses only needed to be capable of working small plots of land, the attitudes toward horse breeding that had prevailed during the Edo period persisted into the Meiji era. However, as the Imperial Army and Navy modernized, the roles and capabilities required of military horses became more demanding, creating a need for the improvement of horse breeds and the enhancement of soldiers' horsemanship skills.

The poor quality of Japanese military horses exposed during the First Sino-Japanese War and Russo-Japanese War led to horse racing being promoted as a state-sponsored initiative; its objectives were to select superior horses and to hone the skills of those who handled them. This stands in stark contrast to the history of horse racing in the British Empire, where royalty and the aristocracy championed the sport because they valued it for its own sake, whereas in Japan, horse racing has historically been utilized as a tool for political authorities to achieve specific goals.

Negishi Racecourse served as the birthplace of major races that continue to this day; it hosted the "Mikado's Vase"—the precursor to the Imperial Prize races (held ten times annually across various locations before being consolidated into the biannual schedule starting in the autumn of 1937 and evolving into the modern-day Tenno Sho)—and saw the establishment of the "Yokohama Ministry of Agriculture and Forestry Prize for Four-Year-Olds", modern-day Satsuki Sho (Japanese 2000 Guineas) in 1939. Additionally, "Special Races"—equivalent to today's graded stakes—were held at the venue, including the Yokohama Tokubetsu (starting in 1928) and the Yokohama Ministry of Agriculture and Forestry Prize for Four- and Five-Year-Olds (starting in 1938).

=== Betting and the Prosperity of Negishi Racecourse ===
Because Negishi Racecourse was located within the foreign settlement, it was subject to extraterritoriality; consequently, gambling—which was prohibited under Japanese criminal law at the time—was openly conducted there from the very beginning. Early betting methods included a lottery-style system known as "Gara" and the bookmaker system still widely used abroad. However, the lottery system generated very little revenue for the race organizers, with the majority of proceeds going to the lottery operators themselves, leaving many racecourses to operate at a chronic financial loss.

Hosting horse races requires substantial capital—covering not only the high costs of maintaining vast racecourse tracks but also the need for large prize purses to attract expensive racehorses. Consequently, in 1888, the parimutuel betting system was introduced on a full scale; this system is now widely adopted across Japan's public sports betting sectors, including the Central and Local Horse Racing organizations. The parimutuel system makes it easy to prevent fraud by organizers or horse owners, and because the organizer's revenue is not tied to the race outcome, bettors can purchase tickets with confidence while the organizers secure stable, significant earnings.

As the organizer—the Nippon Race Club—began selling betting tickets itself and accumulating profits from the sales, it established a self-sustaining financial foundation, moving away from its previous reliance on the support of wealthy domestic and foreign members and the Meiji government. While other racecourses were disbanding, the Negishi Racecourse pursued its own unique path of development, which included importing Western-bred horses (Australian Thoroughbreds) from Australia. The Nippon Race Club also acquired land surrounding the racecourse and, in 1906, constructed a golf course—the third in Japan and the first in Eastern Japan. This facility became the first golf course in the country to feature grass greens. Concurrently, the club established the "Japan Race Club Golf Association" to manage and operate the course. In 1906, the sale of betting tickets was tacitly permitted at racecourses other than Yokohama, sparking a nationwide horse racing boom that began the following year.

While the tacit approval of betting ticket sales led to the construction of racecourses across the country, some operating organizations engaged in misconduct in their pursuit of profit; consequently, when the sale of betting tickets was banned under the Penal Code enacted on October 5, 1907, horse racing continued only on a modest scale through government subsidies ("subsidy racing"). Throughout this period, however, the Nippon Race Club maintained independent operations without subsidies, with its finances bolstered by revenue from its golf course. In 1909, a large contingent of horses and personnel traveled to Vladivostok for a major Japan-Russia race meeting co-hosted by a Russian racing club and the Japan Race Club; this is considered the first overseas expedition by Japanese-trained horses.

In 1912, members of the Nippon Race Club pooled their funds to jointly own racehorses under the pseudonym "Colonel Bogey," a practice that served as the precursor to the modern system of fractional racehorse ownership (club ownership). "Subsidy racing" continued until the enactment of the (original) Horse Racing Law in 1923, which officially authorized the sale of betting tickets. Following the enactment of this law, eleven racing clubs were organized across the country to conduct officially sanctioned races. While the Nippon Race Club held sanctioned races at the Negishi Racecourse, the autumn Negishi race meeting was cancelled that year due to the Great Kanto Earthquake, with racing resuming the following spring. The grandstand, which had been partially destroyed in the earthquake, was initially replaced by a makeshift structure; construction of a new stand began in 1929, eventually resulting in the completion of facilities such as first- and second-class viewing areas.

=== The Impact of World War II and the Demise of the Racecourse ===
Following the Manchurian Incident—sparked by the Liutiaohu Incident of 1931—Japan plunged into the Second Sino-Japanese War, and the nation increasingly shifted toward a wartime footing. Amidst this climate, the revision of the (original) Horse Racing Law in 1936 led to the dissolution of horse racing clubs across the country and their consolidation into the Japan Racing Society (Nippon Keiba-kai). The Japan Race Club was absorbed in October 1937, and the name "Negishi Racecourse"—used since its inception—was changed to "Japan Racing Society Yokohama Racecourse."

Even as the atmosphere of war intensified, horse racing remained a popular form of leisure for the public, and racecourses—including the one in Yokohama—saw steady growth in both attendance and betting turnover. At the same time, however, anti-foreigner sentiment became increasingly pronounced; notably, in 1940, States Isaacs was removed from his position as manager of the Yokohama Racecourse on the grounds of advanced age.

Following the outbreak of the Pacific War in 1941, the Yokohama Racecourse clubhouse was converted by the Kanagawa Prefectural Police into an internment camp for civilians of enemy nations. In 1942, the Ministry of the Navy requisitioned the site—citing its strategic location overlooking a naval port and its necessity for military operations—forcing the cancellation of race meets; the track ultimately closed on June 10, 1943, bringing an end to its 76-year history of horse racing. The race meets originally scheduled for Yokohama that year were held at Tokyo Racecourse for the spring season and Nakayama Racecourse for the autumn season.

After its closure, the facility was sold to the Imperial Japanese Navy. The clubhouse served as an internment camp for Allied civilians until their repatriation via wartime exchange ships, while the grandstand housed a printing plant for Bunjudo, a company that handled classified documents.

When the transfer of the Yokohama Racecourse's land and facilities was at issue, Izaemon Yasuda, the second Chairman of the Japan Racing Society, requested that the Army Section of the Imperial General Headquarters facilitate the acquisition of a replacement site as a condition. After evaluating potential locations, the Society selected an area south of Sagami-Ono Station on the Tokyu (now Odakyu Electric Railway) Odawara Line—specifically in Sagamihara-machi, Koza-gun, Kanagawa Prefecture (formerly Ono-mura; currently Sagami-Ono and Kamitsuruma in Minami Ward, Sagamihara City)—and along the Enoshima Line branching from that station. They planned the construction of a racecourse featuring a 2,400-meter track and 70 stable buildings, subsequently requesting the military's assistance in securing the land and providing construction materials; however, the war was already in its final stages, and the military situation was rapidly deteriorating. Consequently, after their repeated requests were rejected, time ran out with the Surrender of Japan, and the construction of the new racecourse never materialized.

=== Post-World War II ===
For the Japan Racing Society, the revival of the Yokohama Racecourse—which had been requisitioned and forced to close—was a matter of significant concern; consequently, starting on August 29, 1945 (immediately after the war ended), Izaemon Yasuda repeatedly petitioned the government for its return. However, on September 3 of that year—the day after Mamoru Shigemitsu, the 64th Minister for Foreign Affairs, signed the Instrument of Surrender—the facility was requisitioned by the arriving occupation forces (primarily the U.S. Army), just as other military facilities in the city had been. Although an application for the return of the property was subsequently filed in late 1946, no progress was made.

However, in 1947, C. H. Moss—a former member of the Japan Race Club with ties to the Occupation forces and the head of the "International Race Club" (an incorporated association authorized by the Kanagawa Prefectural Governor to host horse racing and other sports for recreational purposes)—applied to Prime Minister Shigeru Yoshida to lease the Yokohama Racecourse. Alarmed by this move, Yasuda and the Japan Racing Society countered by shifting their own request from a purchase application to a usage permit application; consequently, in July of that year, Tetsu Katayama—who had succeeded Yoshida as the 46th Prime Minister—decided that the racecourse would be transferred back to its original owner, the Japan Racing Society. Although the issue of usage rights was resolved, the grandstand continued to be used by Bunjudo as a printing plant for the U.S. military and later served as an office for the U.S. military's housing administration. Meanwhile, the track itself was repurposed as a parking lot for military trucks and saw the revival of a golf course within its infield, rendering it unusable as a racecourse in its existing state, while the lifting of the requisition order was also significantly delayed.

The requisition of some facilities was finally lifted in 1964, and the majority of the remaining land was returned by the United States to the Japanese government in 1969. In 1973, the government sold most of the site to the Japan Racing Association (JRA)—which had been established in 1954 following the dissolution of the Japan Racing Society and the subsequent period of state-run racing—thereby placing the property back into the hands of the central racing organizer for the first time in 30 years. (Technically, this was an exchange for land the JRA had previously acquired in Hachioji City—specifically the Katakura-cho area, now known as Minamino and surrounding the current JR Yokohama Line Hachioji-Minamino Station—intended for the relocation of the Tokyo Racecourse's stable facilities.) However, reviving the site as a modern central racing venue was no longer a realistic option. Factors contributing to this included the transformation of the surrounding area into a residential district, the continued presence of U.S. military housing (the Naval Housing Annex Negishi) on part of the site, and the modernization and expansion of other JRA-managed racecourses. Furthermore, the site was located in an area with no nearby conventional railway stations; the Yokohama City Tram—which had been expected to serve as the sole rail-based transport link to the track should racing resume—had already been discontinued.

Ultimately, the site was not reopened as a racetrack but was instead developed into a park; in 1977, Negishi Forest Park (developed by the City of Yokohama after acquiring the land rent-free from the Ministry of Finance's Financial Bureau), Negishi Racecourse Memorial Park (developed by the JRA), and the Horse Museum were established there.

Under the (new) Horse Racing Law enacted in 1948, Yokohama Racecourse—along with Miyazaki Racecourse, where racing had also been suspended during the war—was long classified as a "racecourse with suspended operations" following its return, and it legally remained on the books until 1991. The provision in Article 2 of the Horse Racing Law limiting the number of Central Horse Racing venues to twelve is a legacy of this classification, as it included Yokohama and Miyazaki in addition to the ten venues where Central Horse Racing is currently held. Note that Article 1 of the Ordinance for Enforcement of the Horse Racing Law designates the ten venues for Central Horse Racing as Sapporo, Hakodate, Fukushima, Niigata, Nakayama, Tokyo, Chukyo, Kyoto, Hanshin, and Kokura.

== Remains ==
The First-Class and Second-Class grandstands and the paddock—designed by the American architect Jay Morgan (who also designed the original Marunouchi Building in Tokyo) and completed in 1929—were released from U.S. military requisition in 1981, later than the racetrack itself. In 1987, Yokohama City purchased the land and buildings from the national government and explored ways to utilize them; however, plans were never formulated because the view—specifically the fact that the U.S. military base was visible from the site—was once again raised as an issue. Although the Architectural Institute of Japan petitioned the city that same year to preserve the structures as "valuable historical and cultural heritage," the Second-Class grandstand and the paddock were demolished in 1988 due to their dilapidated condition.

The First-Class Grandstand, the only surviving structure from the Yokohama Racecourse located within Negishi Forest Park, was designated as a "Modern Industrial Heritage Site" by the Ministry of Economy, Trade and Industry in 2009; however, it remains off-limits to the public, with only minimal maintenance—such as perimeter fencing—carried out, and virtually no restoration work performed on the building itself since the site's return. In 2015, the Retired Horse Association (an NPO) and the Association for Historic Buildings and Community Development jointly submitted a petition to the City of Yokohama requesting the building's preservation and utilization as a cultural asset. On May 16, 2021, it was reported that the City of Yokohama plans to renovate and preserve the structure and consider its future use, taking into account the building's advanced state of deterioration as well as the agreement between Japan and the United States to return the adjacent Negishi Housing Area.

On January 22, 2025, the Urban Design Office of the Yokohama City Urban Development Bureau announced that the First-Class Grandstand had been designated as a Yokohama City Certified Historic Building under the name "Former Negishi Racecourse First-Class Grandstand." Plans are in place to carry out renovation work—including seismic retrofitting—with the aim of opening the facility to the public by 2029, which marks the centenary of its completion.

== Gallery ==
=== Negishi Racecourse (1866-1942) ===
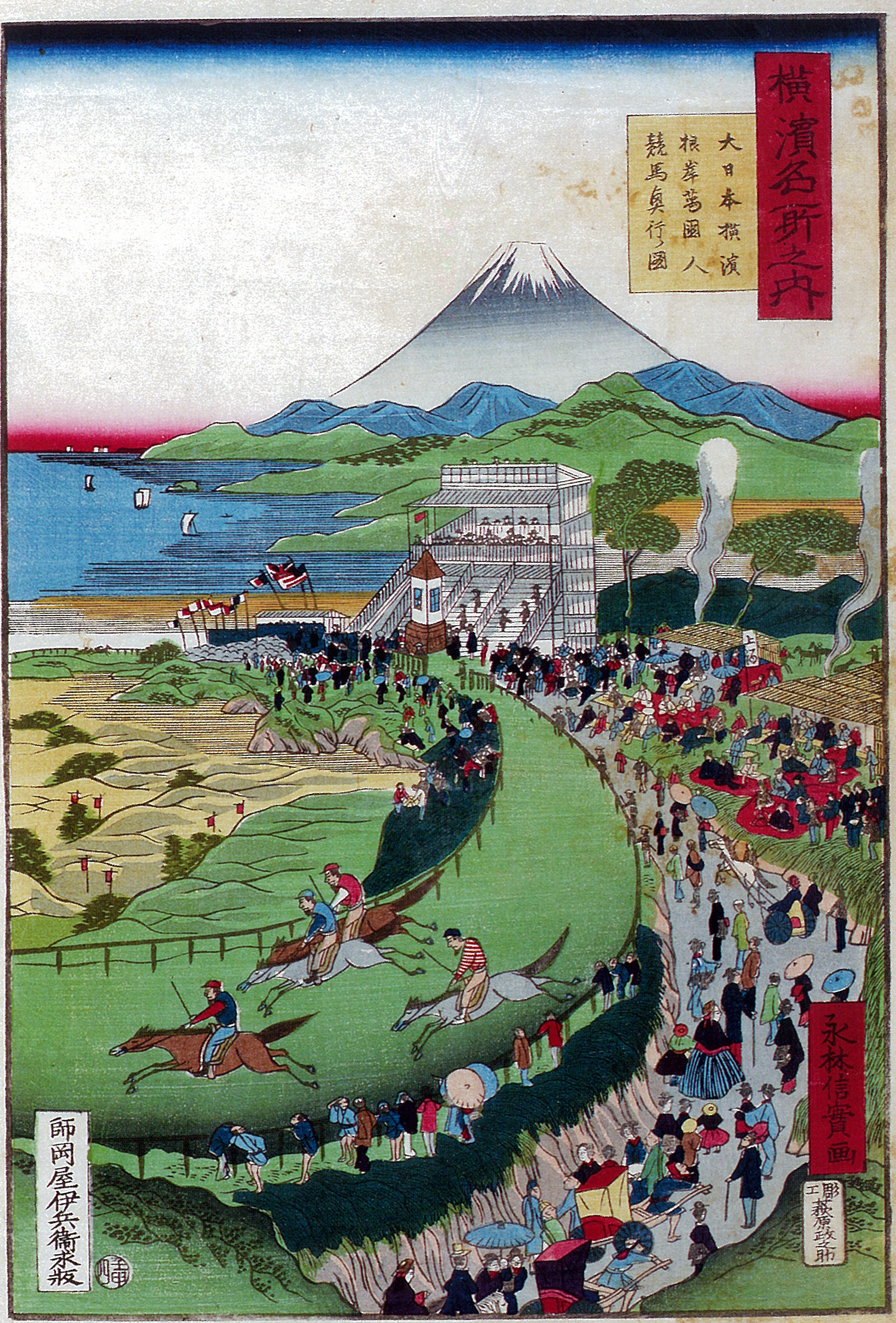
Negishi Racecourse as depicted in 1872

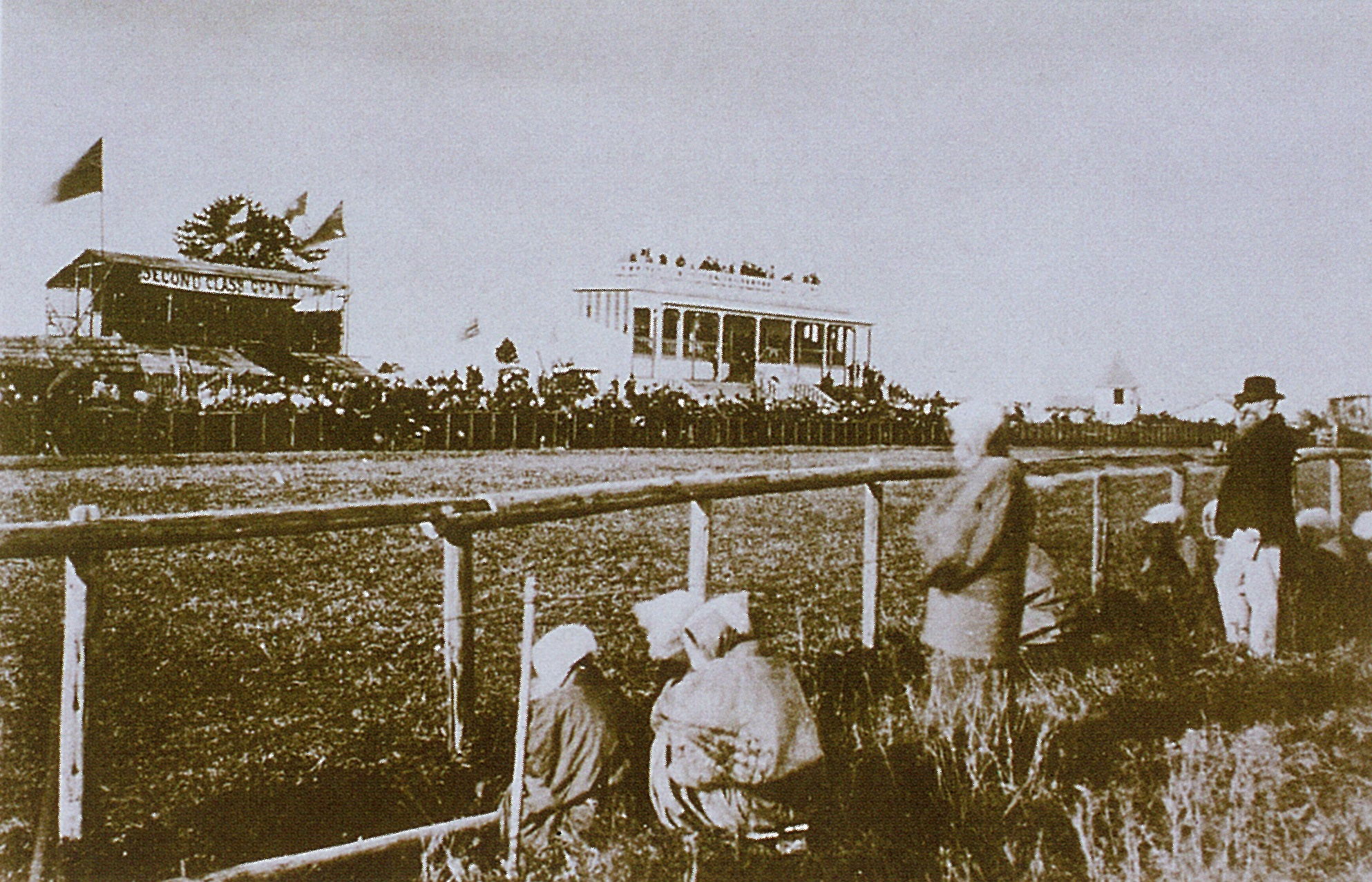
In front of the main stand of Negishi Racecourse in 1870

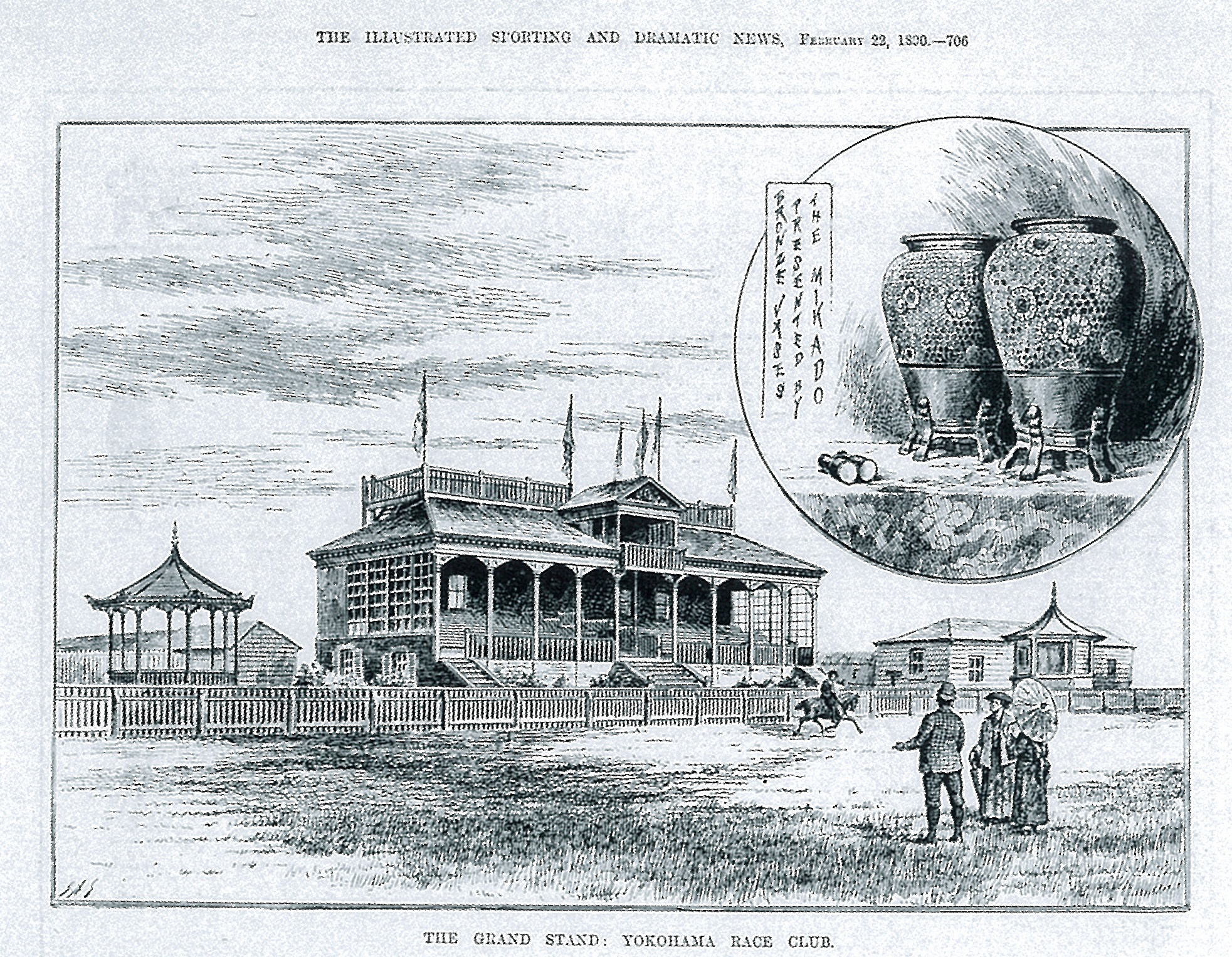
The main stand of the Negishi Racecourse and the bronze vase presented as an Imperial gift in 1888

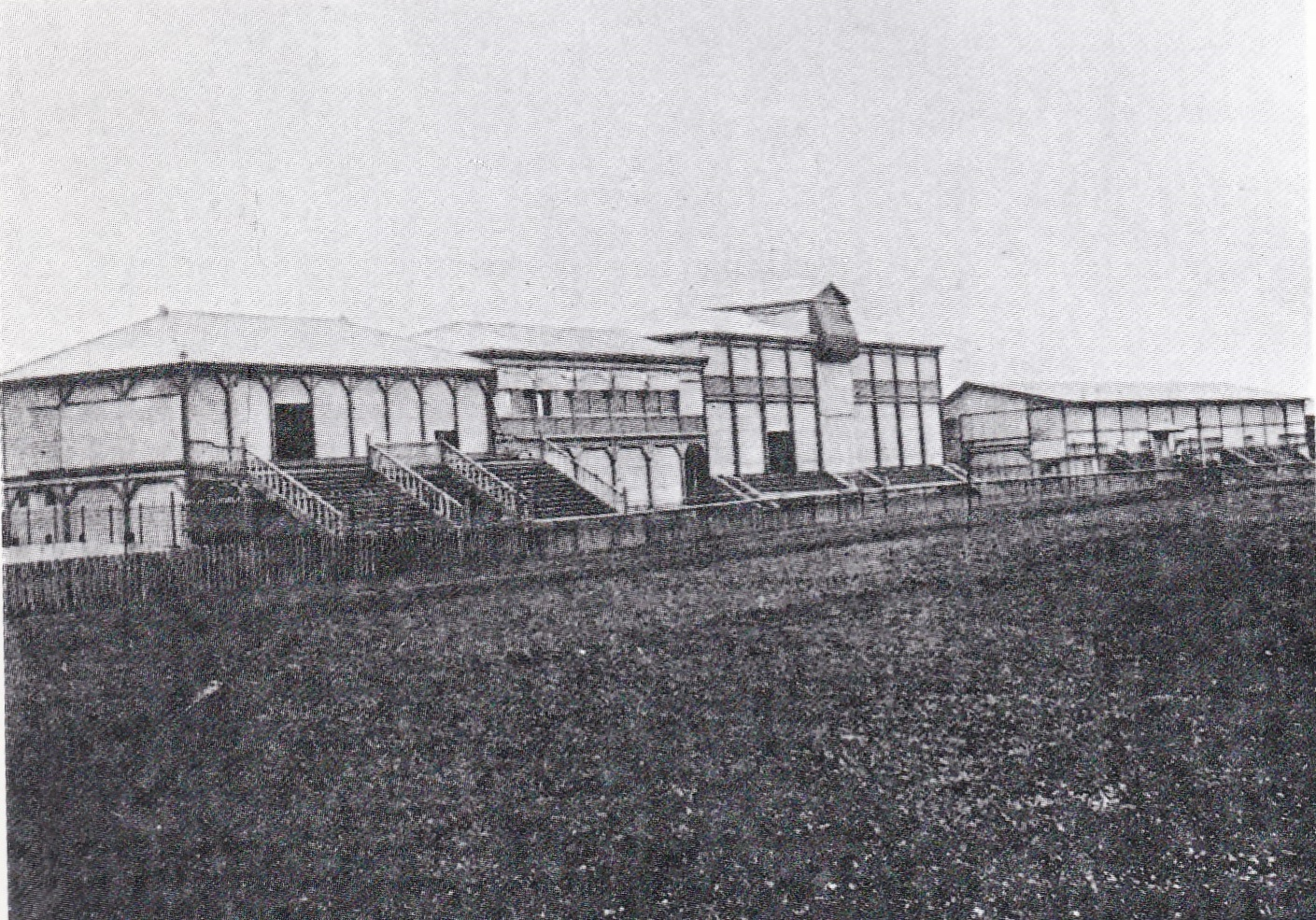
The main stand of the Negishi Racecourse in 1907

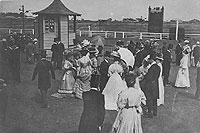
View of the Negishi Racecourse in 1908

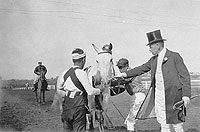
Training in the Negishi Racecourse in 1908

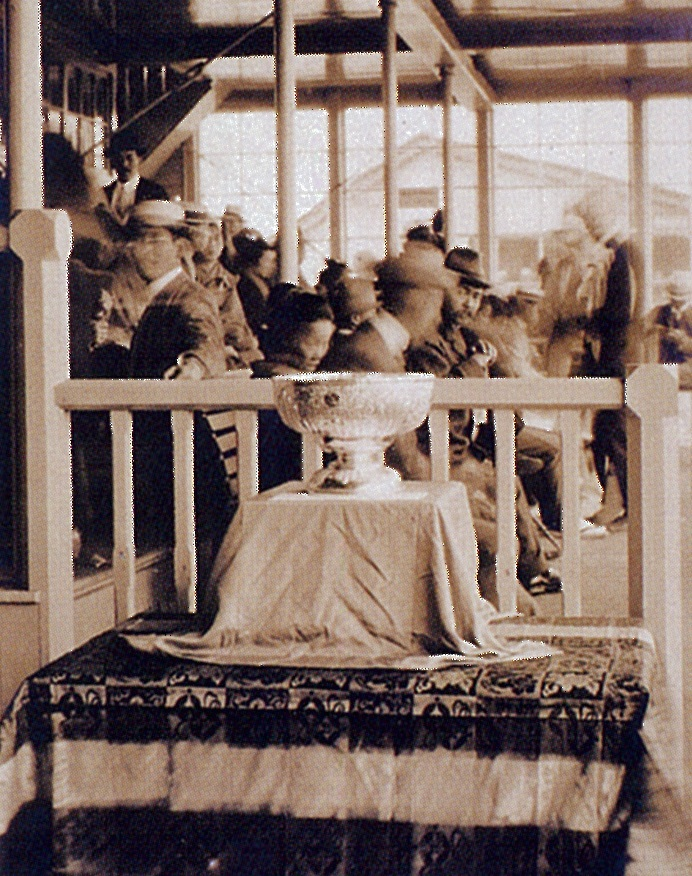
flower arrangement vessel bestowed upon the Nippon Race Club at Teishitsu Goshoten in 1908

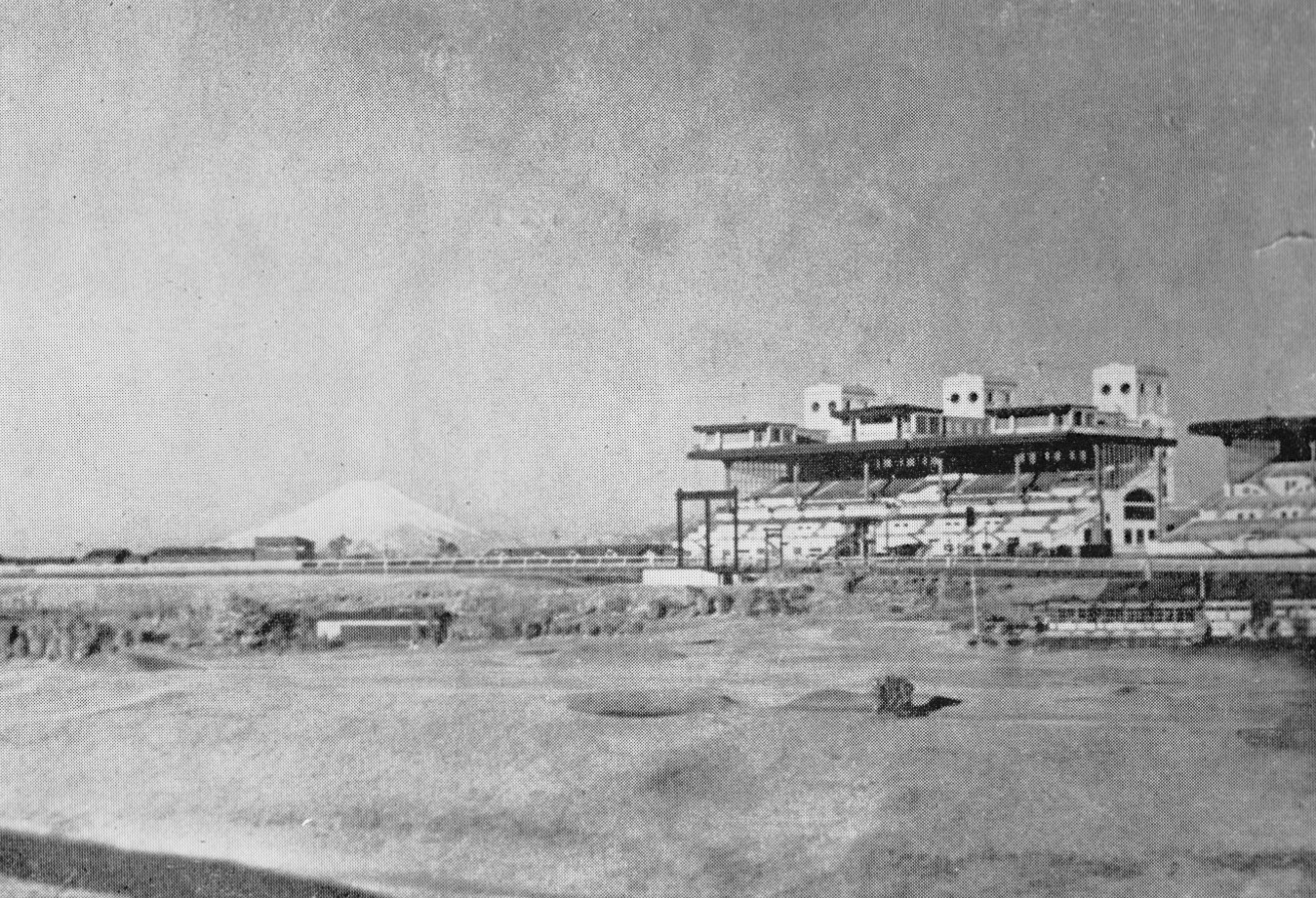
First-class viewing stand viewed from the track in 1929

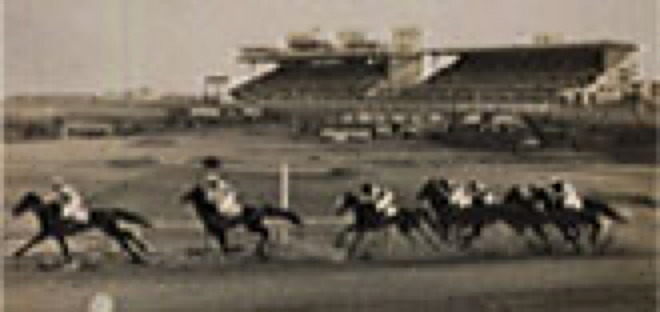
Race scene in 1934. First-class grandstand (background left), second-class grandstand (background right).

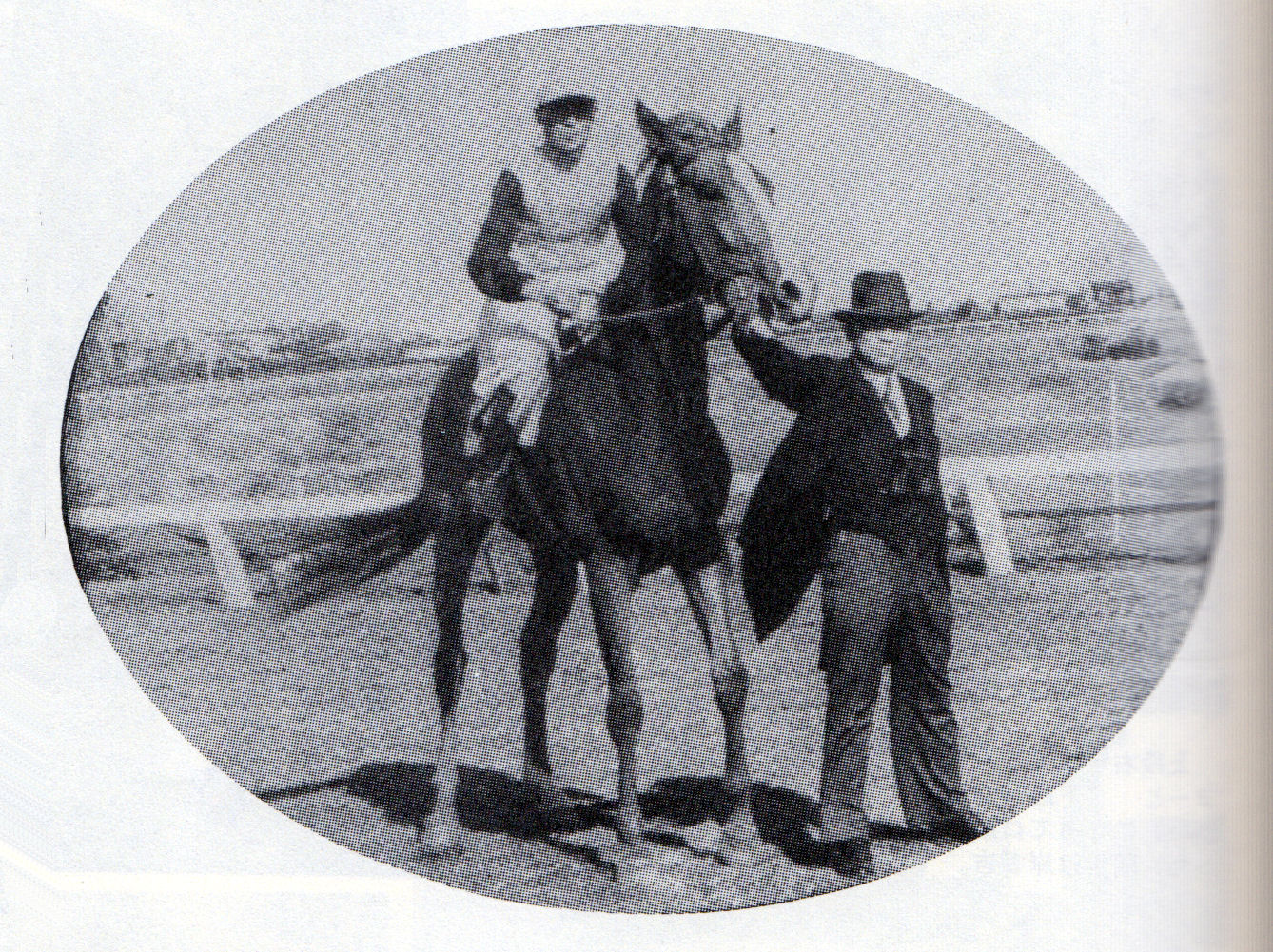
Rock Park, winner of the first Satsuki sho in 1939

=== Remains ===
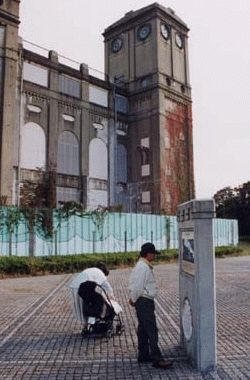
West side of the first-class horse viewing site

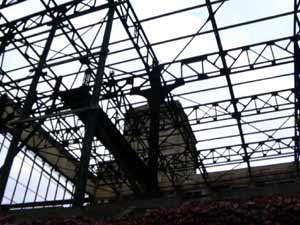
East side of the first-class horse viewing site

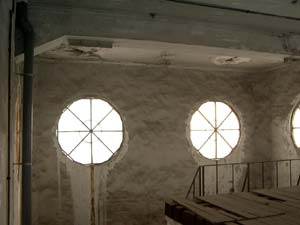
Inside of the first-class horse viewing site tower

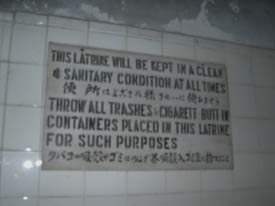
A warning about smoking posted in a restroom at the racecourse; the text is in two languages

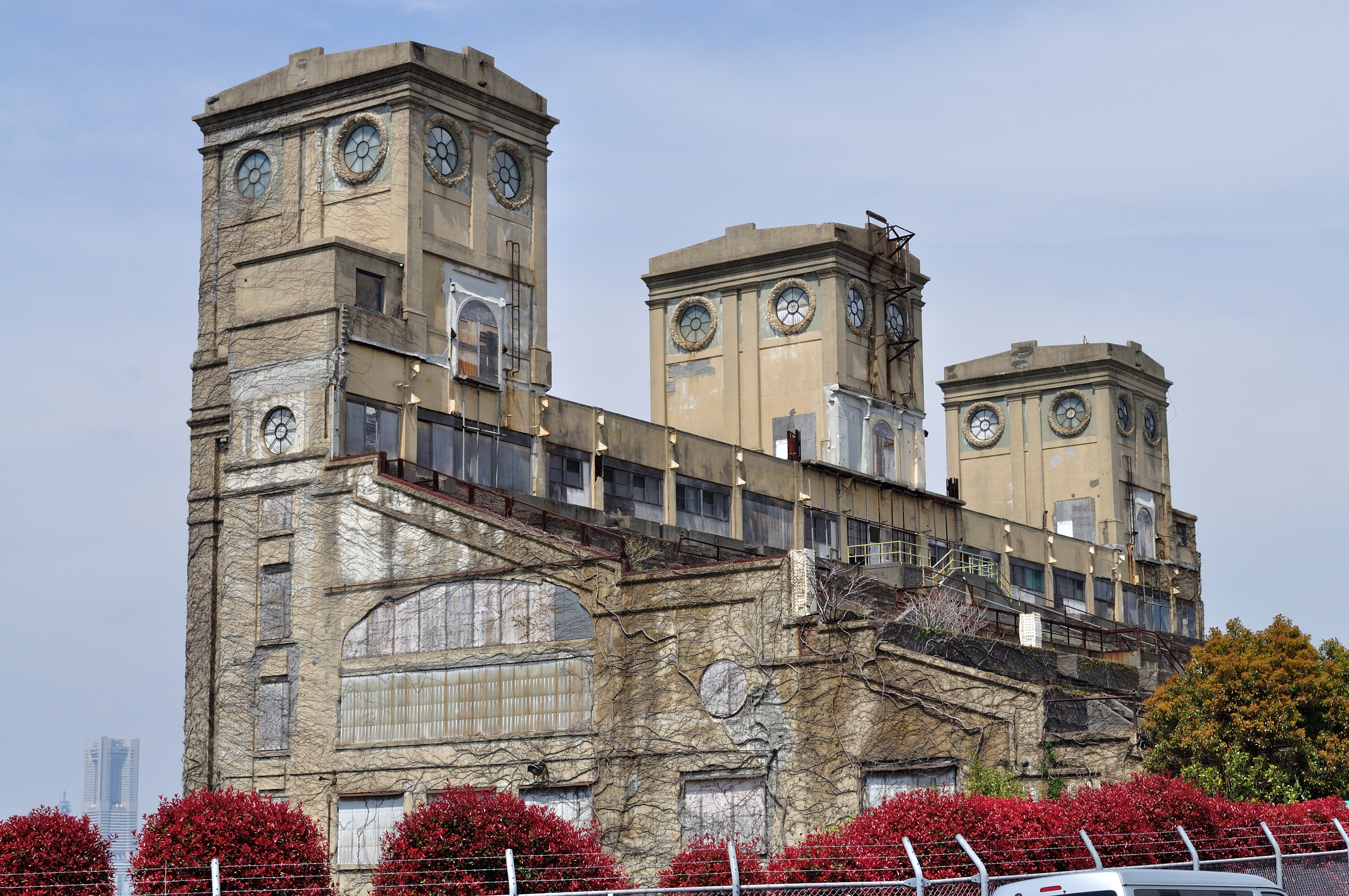
The former Yokohama Racecourse site viewed from the adjacent Negishi Housing Area

== Commemorating Negishi Racecourse ==
Tokyo Racecourse hosts the Negishi Stakes (Grade 3, 1400 metres on dirt), a graded race named after the former Yokohama (Negishi) Racecourse. This race serves as a prelude to the February Stakes (Grade 1)—held at Tokyo Racecourse in February—with the winner granted priority entry into that event.

Additionally, the design of the "Fuji View Stand"—the main stand at Tokyo Racecourse—incorporates elements from the first-class viewing stand of the former Yokohama Racecourse.

== See also ==
- Horseracing in Japan
