= List of Designated Third Country Nationals =

This is a list of designated third country nationals that require advance authorization to access US military bases in Japan. It should be considered by prospective attendees of the various friendship festivals held at US bases around Japan.

== List as of 2011 ==
- Afghanistan
- Algeria
- Bahrain
- Bangladesh
- Belarus
- Bosnia and Herzegovina
- Burma (Myanmar)
- China
- Cuba
- Djibouti
- Egypt
- Georgia
- Hong Kong
- India
- Indonesia
- Iran
- Iraq
- Israel
- Jordan
- Kazakhstan
- Kuwait
- Kyrgyzstan
- Laos
- Lebanon
- Libya
- Macau
- Malaysia
- Nigeria
- North Korea
- Pakistan
- Palestinian Authority
- Qatar
- Russian Federation
- Rwanda
- Saudi Arabia
- Singapore
- Somalia
- South Africa
- Sudan
- Syria
- Taiwan
- Tajikistan
- Tunisia
- Ukraine
- United Arab Emirates
- Uzbekistan
- Venezuela
- Vietnam
- Yemen

== Inclusion of France ==
While most countries on the list are those with a history of instability or tension with the US, the inclusion of France in 2009 did attract some media attention in Japan when a French citizen was blocked from visiting a "Friendship Day" at Negishi Heights in Yokohama in 2010. As of 2011 France had been removed from the list.

== Differences between 2009 and 2011 lists ==
In the 2009 list Albania, Armenia, Azerbaijan, Bolivia, Colombia, Croatia, France, Macedonia, Mali, Morocco, Nicaragua, Oman, Peru, Serbia and Montenegro, Turkmenistan and Vietnam were included. In the 2011 list they were removed.

In the 2011 list Rwanda and South Africa were added.
