= Christ Church, Yokohama =

Christ Church
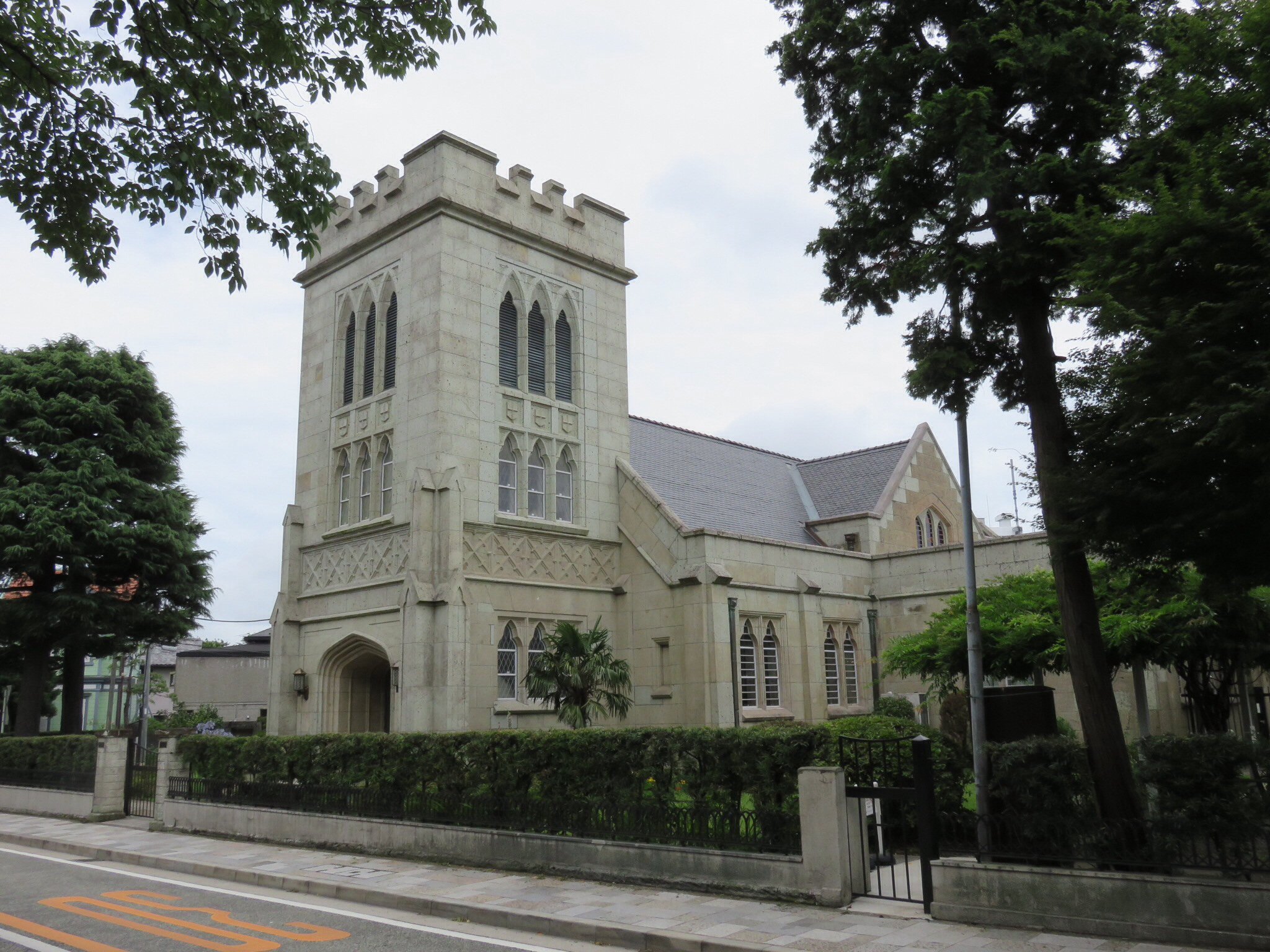
- Christ Church, Yokohama
- Christ Church
- 35°26′17″N 139°39′09″E
- Location: The Bluff, Yokohama
- Country: Japan
- Denomination: Nippon Sei Ko Kai
- Website: http://www.yokohamachristchurch.org

History
- Founded: 1862

Architecture
- Architect: Jay Hill Morgan
- Style: Neo-Norman
- Years built: 1931

Christ Church, Yokohama (横浜山手聖公会 Yokohama Yamate Seikokai), is a historic Anglican church located in Yamate, Yokohama, Japan. Providing a center of worship for both Japanese and English-language congregations the church traces its foundation to shortly after the formal opening of the treaty port of Yokohama in 1859.

The church building has been rebuilt and refurbished on several occasions as a result of fires, earthquakes and the incendiary bombing experienced during the later stages of the Second World War. Christ Church has been located on its current site in Yamate since 1901 and is part of the Yokohama Diocese of the Nippon Sei Ko Kai, the Anglican Church in Japan.

== History ==
=== Early beginnings as the garrison church (1859–1901) ===
After the opening of the treaty port in 1859, Anglicans in the foreign community initially gathered for worship services in the British consul's residence and later in the courtroom of the British consulate. Christ Church, with its prominent position overlooking the location of the former Kannai foreign settlement, was the replacement for the original Yokohama garrison church. The garrison church, also called Christ Church, was a wooden structure built on lot 105 in Yamashita-cho, close to the Nakamura River. Funding was provided by the local foreign community with a matching grant for funds raised from the British government. Construction of the church building and an adjacent rectory commenced in early 1862 with the first consular chaplain, the Rev. Michael Buckworth Bailey arriving in Yokohama in August of the same year.

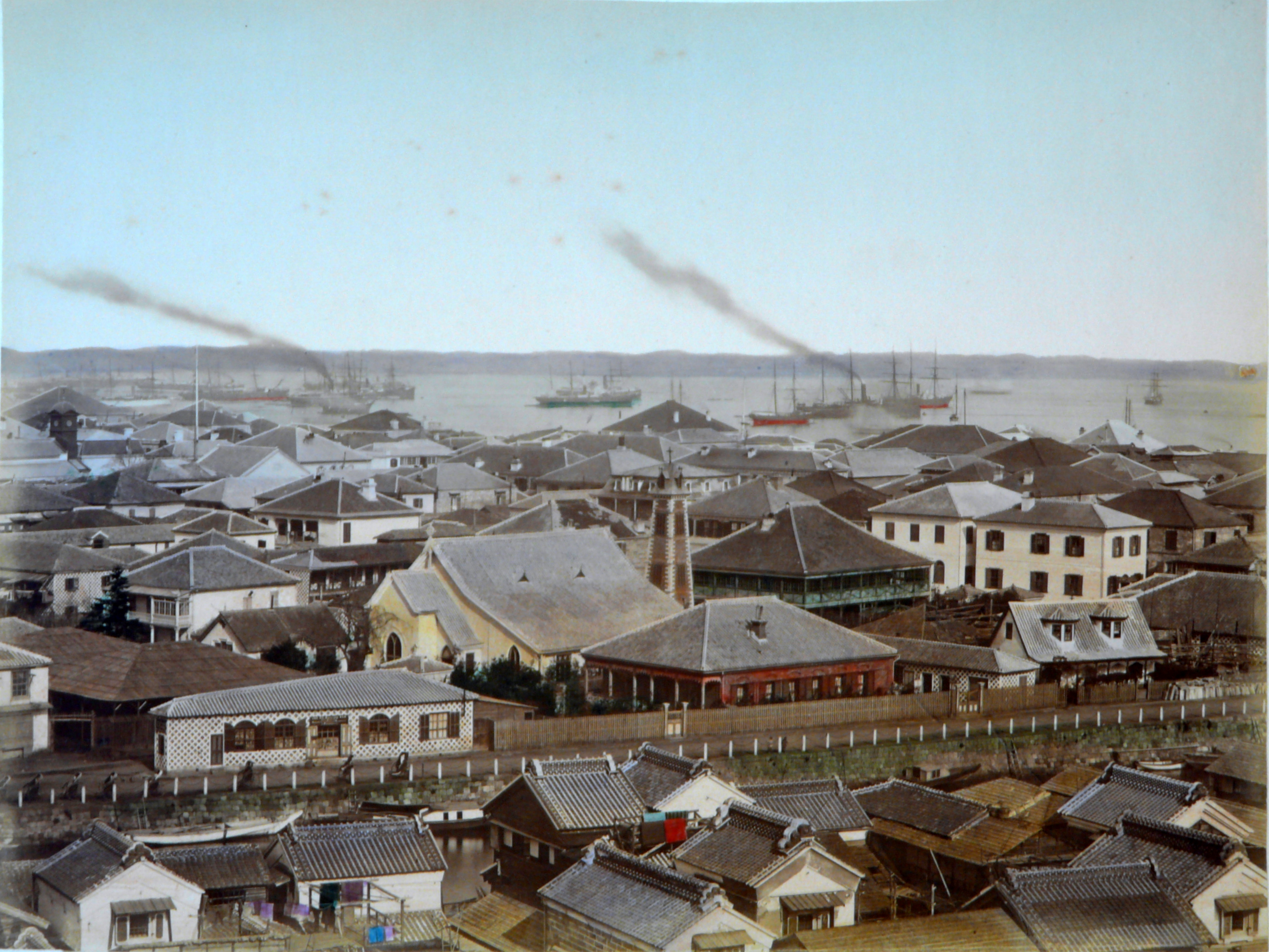
View over the Yokohama Foreign Settlement circa 1880 by Kusakabe Kimbei showing Christ Church, at the center of the image at its original location in Yamashita-cho.

The first church services were held at Christ Church's new building on 18 October 1863. The church was frequented by members of the British military garrison, the British legation as well as American Episcopalians. The church survived the great fire that destroyed much of the foreign settlement on 26 November 1866 and provided a sanctuary for the homeless in aftermath of the disaster.

Bailey retired on 1 April 1873 and was replaced by Acting Consular Chaplain Revd. Edward W. Syle (17 February 1817 – 5 October 1890). Syle was born in Barnstaple, England, but after emigration to the United States as a young man graduated from Kenyon College, Ohio, and the Virginia Theological Seminary. The departure of Bailey and the British military garrison marked a change in the finances of Christ Church: the British government withdrawing its annual consular stipend of 400 pounds per annum at the end of 1875.

In 1880, the Rev. Edward Champneys Irwine, a graduate of Trinity College, Dublin, was appointed rector, a role in which he continued to serve for 21 years before being forced to resign amid untried allegations of criminal offenses against children.

=== Second church building (1901–1923) ===
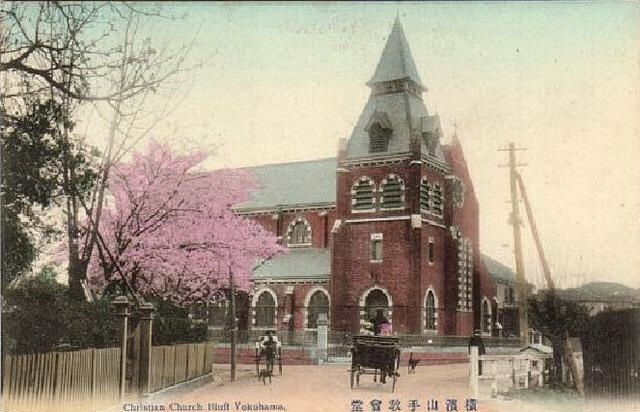
The second Christ Church, designed by British architect Josiah Conder and consecrated in 1901, at its new location in Yamate.

A second, much larger building, constructed in red Glasgow brick, at the current church’s location overlooking the foreign settlement, was designed by the influential British architect Josiah Conder and dedicated on Trinity Sunday, 2 June 1901. In 1922 the church was visited by Edward, Prince of Wales, on the occasion of the dedication of memorials to the First World War at the adjacent Yokohama Foreign General Cemetery.

This imposing, second church structure, and much of the city, was however completely destroyed by the Great Kantō earthquake on the morning of 1 September 1923. The Rev. Eustace Mordaunt Strong, Chaplain of Christ Church from 1917 to 1925, escaped unharmed from the collapse of the YMCA Seaman's Club and was instrumental both in coordinating rescue efforts in the immediate aftermath of the earthquake and in fundraising for new, reinforced church buildings on the same site. For his efforts in helping to rescue of some three hundred foreigners and Japanese from an advancing fire on the Yamate ridge, the Rev. Strong was awarded an OBE.

Between 1923 and 1930, a wooden church shipped from the United States, served as temporary sanctuary for the church congregation.

=== Third church building (1931–present) ===
The current church building was designed by American architect Jay Hill Morgan and dates from 1931. Constructed on a steel reinforced concrete frame, the exterior facade mixes both traditional Anglo-Saxon and Norman church design elements. Extensively damaged by incendiary bombing on 29 May 1945, and again by a fire in January 2005, the interior has been refurbished on several occasions. In the immediate aftermath of the Second World War rebuilding of the church was led by American service personnel with worship services conducted in the open air until a reconsecration of the repaired church nave and choir in December 1947. The exterior Ōya Stone cladding and tower are true to the original 1930s design.

== Mission to Seafarers ==
The Mission to Seafarers has maintained an active presence in Yokohama since the 1880s. From 1952 the chaplain to the English language congregation at Christ Church has also concurrently served as chaplain to the mission.

== Popular events ==
The Christ Church, Yokohama, is one of the three English-language Anglican/Episcopal churches in Japan (the others being the St. Andrew's Cathedral, Tokyo and the St. Michael's Cathedral, Kobe), where the festival of Nine Lessons and Carols, before Christmas, and the evening prayers of Choral evensong, from time to time, are held.

== See also ==
- Anglican Church in Japan
- Anglican Communion
