= Naval Housing Annex Negishi =

Coordinates: 35°25′31″N 139°37′44″E

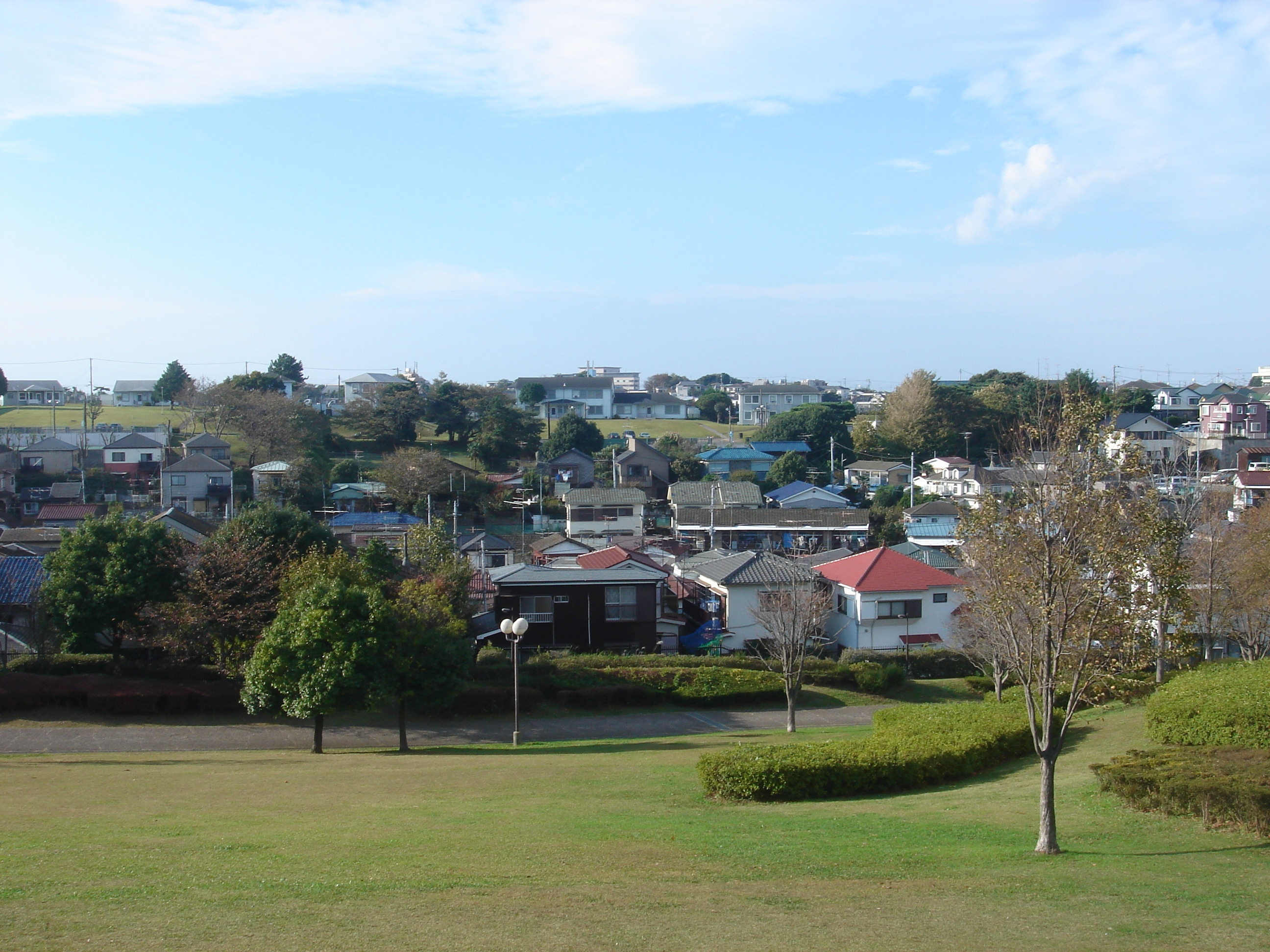

The Negishi Housing Complex (Japanese: 根岸住宅地区 Negishi Juutaku Chiku) was an enclave of United States Forces Japan operated by United States Fleet Activities Yokosuka in Yokohama, Japan. It served as a residence complex for the U.S. military.

== Facilities ==
The area was approximately 42.8 hectares in size and contained some 387 housing units, a Commissary/Navy Exchange, Richard E. Byrd Elementary School, Branch Health Clinic (medical/dental), Combined Bachelor Housing, swimming pool, community center, Security Detachment, and other small infrastructural services to support the residents of the community.

== History ==
Negishi Heights was originally a horse racing complex founded in 1866. Modern horse racing was introduced to Japan in 1862 and shortly thereafter an English architect was commissioned to build the Negishi Grandstands on the land currently occupied by U.S. Navy family members. The area surrounding the grandstands was occupied by numerous foreigners and was built to support their entertainment needs.

The Meiji Emperor made 14 trips to the stadium to view horse racing. The grandstands was one of the few structures to survive the Great Kantō earthquake of 1923. It was later rebuilt by American J. H. Morgan and still stands today. The new stands could hold up to 20,000 spectators, and Emperor Hirohito was known to frequent the events held in Negishi. Horse racing at Negishi was ended in 1942 when the Imperial Japanese Navy took over the site and the racing grounds at Negishi were used for the operation of a printing press and, in the lower horse stables, the housing of Australian prisoners of war. In 1945, when General MacArthur discovered the printing presses during the occupation of Japan, the U.S. Army used the presses to print over 450,000 surrender documents in English, Japanese, and Korean to be distributed across the country.

In 1947, the U.S. Army took over the complex completely and built housing units and other support structures; they used the grandstands for administrative offices. In what is now Negishi Shinrin Park, they built a golf course. The U.S. Army occupied this land area until it was given over to the U.S. Navy on 1 July 1951 and became the first overseas Navy housing facility. The U. S. Navy Housing Activity, Yokohama, Japan was commissioned on 1 July 1959. CDR J. L. Wallace, USN was its first commanding officer with CDR Harland Bowman, CEC, USN as its first executive officer.

The U.S. Navy and the Government of Japan organized the return of the Naval Housing and Support Complex to the Japanese landowners who leased the land, in 2015. Additional units were built in the Zushi Housing Area for military members. The area was officially closed Jan. 1, 2015 and the property returned to the original Japanese landowners.

In April 2026, it was reported that annex would be returned to Japan by Summer 2026.
