= Kasuminome Air Field =

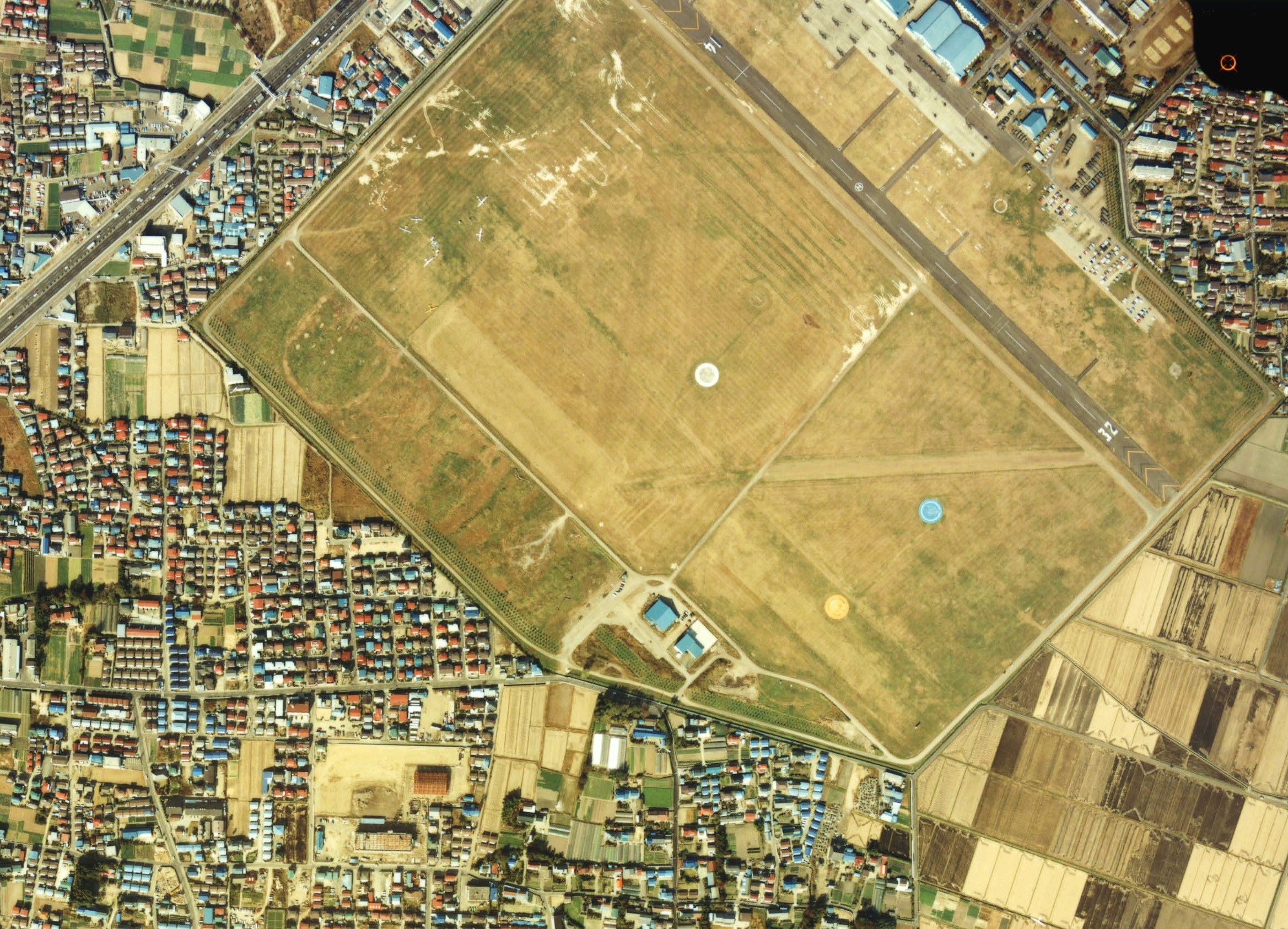
- IATA: none; ICAO: RJSU

Summary
- Airport type: Military
- Operator: Japan Ground Self-Defense Force
- Location: Sendai, Japan
- Elevation AMSL: 23 ft / 7 m
- Coordinates: 38°14′08″N 140°55′23″E

Map
- Location in Japan

Runways
Direction	Length		Surface
Direction	m	ft	Surface
14/32	708	2,323	Sod and roll
09/27	400	1,312	Sod
- Source: Japanese AIP at AIS Japan

Kasuminome Air Field (霞目飛行場, Kasuminome Hikōjō) (ICAO: RJSU) is a military aerodrome of the Japan Ground Self-Defense Force Camp Kasuminome (霞目駐屯地, Kasuminome Chūtonchi). It is located 2.7 NM (5.0 km; 3.1 mi) southeast of Sendai in the Miyagi Prefecture, Japan.

The air field was opened in 1937 as the Sendai Air Field (仙台飛行場, Sendai Hikojo) by the Imperial Japanese Army, and was the location of an air crew training facility. It was called "Lanier Airfield" by the Allied Powers during the Occupation of Japan.
