= Jay Morgan =

American architect (1868–1937)

- Born: Jay Herbert Morgan; 10 December 1868; Buffalo, New York, US
- Died: 6 June 1937 (aged 74); Yokohama General Hospital, Karasawa Nake-uk, Yokohama, Japan
- Occupation: Architect
- Practice: George A. Fuller Company
- Buildings: New York Hippodrome, Christ Church, Yokohama

Jay Herbert Morgan (10 December 1868 – 6 June 1937) was an American architect noted for his work on some of the first steel framed, theatre, racecourse, office and residential buildings. As an architect with the George A. Fuller Company, Morgan is known for his work on the Hippodrome in New York and his design of buildings in Japan both immediately prior to and in the wake of the Great Kantō earthquake.

== Biography ==
He was born on 10 December 1868 in Buffalo, New York.

Morgan first arrived in Japan in 1920 as chief architect for the George A. Fuller Company of the Orient Ltd. In addition to advising on the use of new steel-framed building techniques in the design of new seven and eight story office structures in Marunouchi, Morgan was solely responsible for the design of Brunner, Mond & Company's landmark Crescent Building in the port of Kobe. He married Augusta G. Schossoret on 10 December 1895 in Milwaukee, Wisconsin.

Opening an independent architectural practice in 1922, Morgan contributed to the rebuilding of a number of buildings in the aftermath of the Great Kantō earthquake in 1923. A number of his works still survive including Christ Church, Yokohama (1931), Berrick Hall (1930), and the ruins of the grandstand of the former Negishi Racecourse (1929), all located in or close to the elevated Yamate neighbourhood in Yokohama.

Morgan constructed his own private residence at Fujisawa, Kanagawa in 1931. A community group has been formed to preserve this property but the historic structure suffered arson attacks by an unknown assailant in 2007 and 2008.

Morgan died on 6 June 1937 at the Yokohama General Hospital, Karasawa Nake-uk, Yokohama. His grave is located in the Foreigners General Cemetery in Yamate, Yokohama.

== Selected works ==
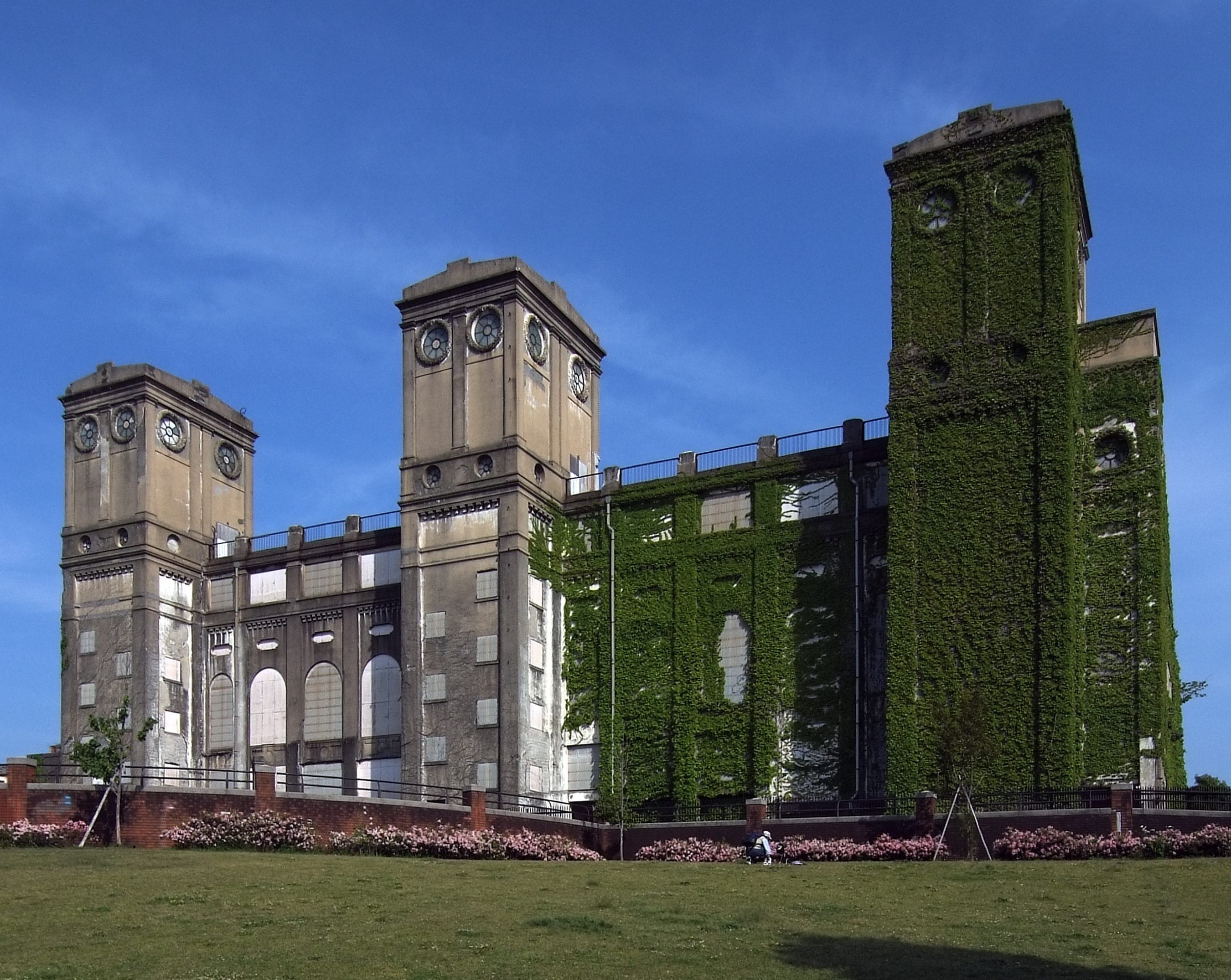
Grandstand of the former Negishi Racecourse, Yokohama

- Main campus building, Rahauser Memorial Chapel and entrance gate of Tohoku Gakuin University, Sendai, Japan
- Christ Church, Yokohama
- Entrance gate and gatehouse of the Foreign General Cemetery, Yamate, Yokohama.
- Grandstand of the former Negishi Racecourse, Yokohama
