= Awdry =

Awdry is a surname. Notable people with the surname include:

- Charles Awdry (1906–1965), English cricketer, British Army officer, High Sheriff of Wiltshire
- Christopher Awdry (born 1940), English author, son of the Rev. W. Awdry
- Daniel Awdry (1924–2008), British politician
- John Wither Awdry (1795–1878), English judge, Chief Justice of the Bombay Supreme Court
- Robert Awdry (1881–1949), English cricketer, British Army officer, High Sheriff of Wiltshire
- Wilbert Awdry (1911–1997), English cleric and author, creator of The Railway Series
- William Awdry (1842–1910), Anglican clergyman, Bishop of Southampton, Osaka and South Tokyo

== See also ==
- Awdry Vaucour (1890–1918), British First World War flying ace
