= Cathedral and John Connon School =

School in South Mumbai, Maharashtra, India

Location
- South Mumbai, Maharashtra; India; 18.936178°N 72.832825°E

Information
- Type: Cathedral School; Private school
- Motto: 'Clarum Efficiunt Studia' ('Studies Achieve Renown')
- Established: 14 November 1860; 165 years ago
- Founder: St. Thomas Cathedral, Bombay
- Dean: Sonal Parmar
- Principal: Sonal Parmar
- Grades: Pre-Primary - 12 and International Baccalaureate
- Gender: Co-ed
- Enrollment: 3,000
- Colours: Purple & Black
- Song: Prima in Indis, Gateway of India
- Athletics: DSO, Mumbai School Sports Association, Anglo-Scottish
- School fees: ₹1.2 lakh annually (CISCE) ₹6.7 lakh annually (IBDP) US$1,260.14 annually (CISCE); US$7,035.89 annually (IBDP)
- Affiliation: CISCE; IGCSE; IBDP; ICSE
- Houses: Barham, Palmer, Savage, Wilson
- Website: cathedral-school.com

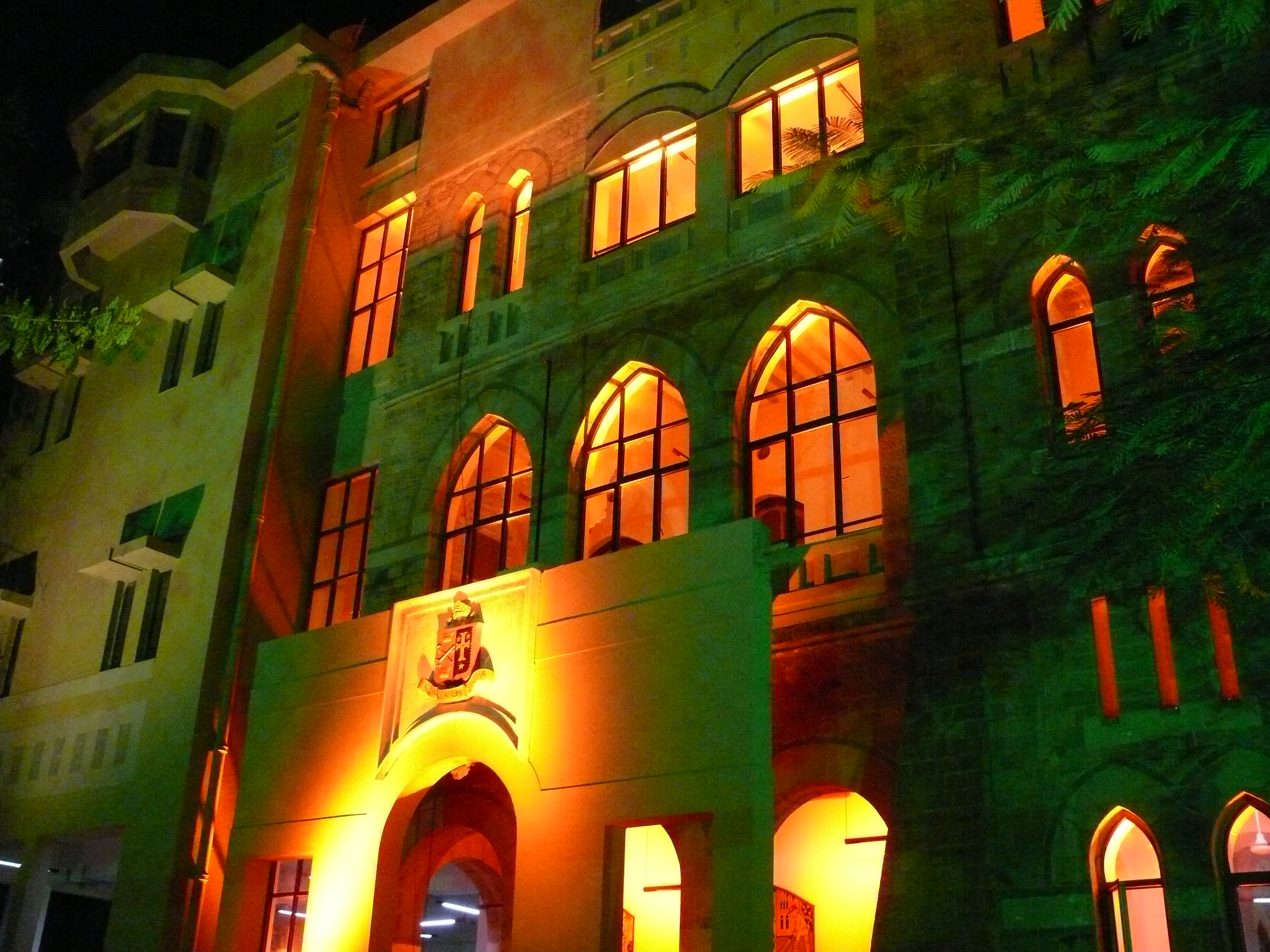
The middle school building

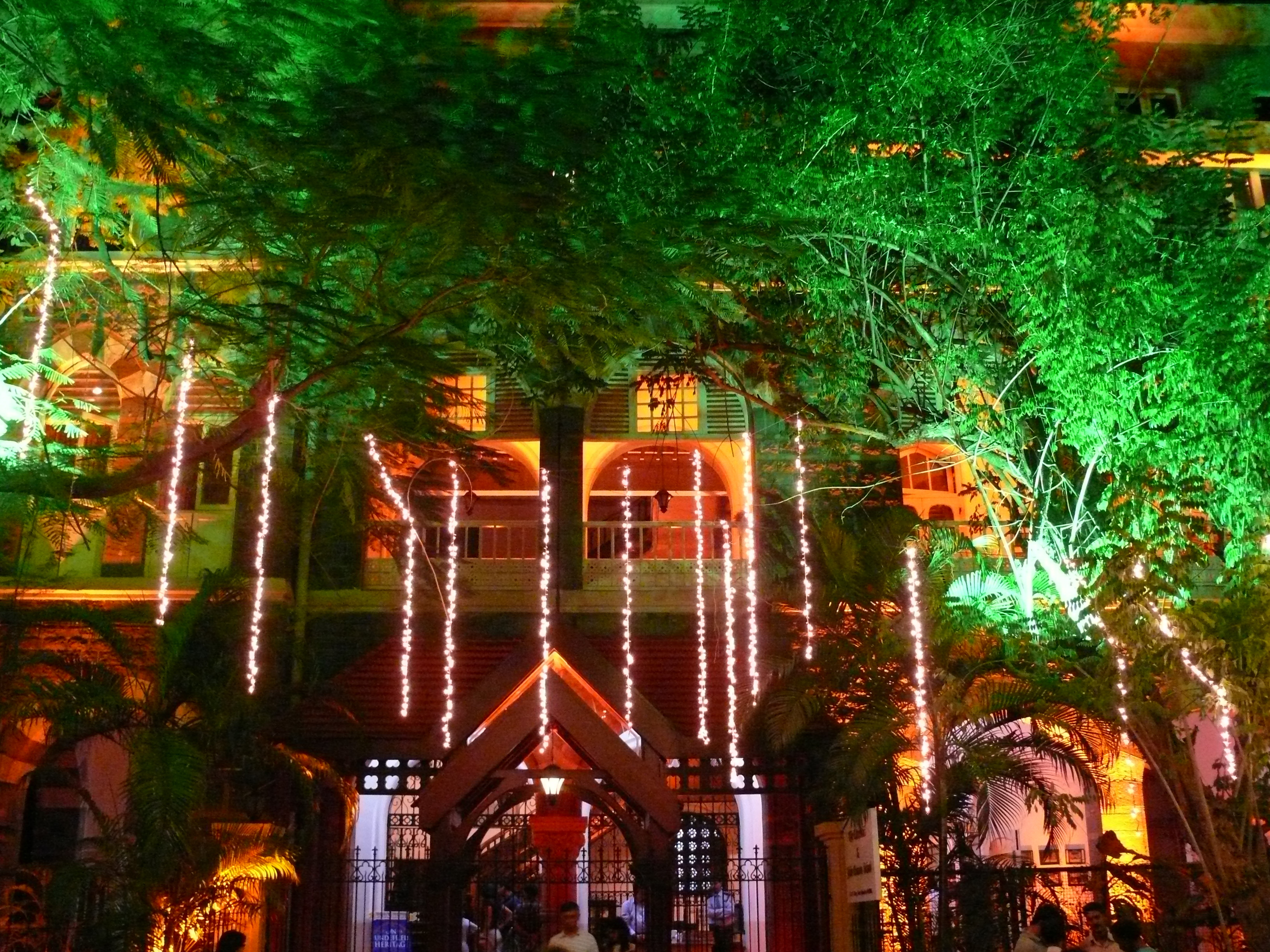
The senior school building lit up for the 150th foundation day celebrations, 2010

The Cathedral and John Connon School is a co-educational private school founded in 1860 and located in Fort, Mumbai, Maharashtra. The school is widely considered to be amongst the best and most prestigious schools in India, housing five sections: Pre-Primary, Infant, Junior, Middle and Senior Schools.

The school is an Anglican foundation actively affiliated with the 300-year-old St. Thomas Cathedral. CAJCS was originally founded in 1860 as a choir school to provide choristers to the cathedral.

== History ==
In 1860, Bishop Harding and the Cathedral Chaplain opened a grammar school within the walled city of Bombay, along with a smaller establishment for girls. These were the first of many strands that have joined to form the Cathedral and John Connon School.

A Choir School was established in 1875, with the objective of providing choristers for the St. Thomas Cathedral, Mumbai, the first Anglican Church in the city. Meanwhile, the Bombay Scottish Education Society was founded in 1866. The society put up a building on the Esplanade and named it for John Connon (then the Chief Registrar of Bombay).

In 1878, a high school in Byculla, set up by the Bombay Diocesan Society, was merged with the Choir School to form the Cathedral High School. The present Senior School building, a blend of Indian and Gothic architecture, was erected in 1896. A girls' school had been started in 1880.

In 1922, in a public meeting held at the Town Hall, the present Asiatic Society of Bombay library, the principal of the Cathedral Boys' School suggested that the Cathedral Schools and the Scottish School work together, instead of competing; this prompted the formation of the Anglo-Scottish Education Society. The schools were re-organized into the Cathedral Boys' School, the Cathedral Girls' School, and the John Connon School.

Today the old boys' school is used as the Senior School; the old girls' school is the Middle School; and the John Connon School is the Junior School. The Infant School, located at Malabar Hill, was set up in 1965. The Senior School also serves as the main administrative office for all the sections of the school.

The IB arm of the school, set up in 2015, planned to move to the Deutsche Bank Building (formerly Tata Palace) by 2018. However, a later decision by the Dean, Dr. Sonal Parmar converted the building into a section for the 11th and 12th standard of both the IBDP and ISC curricula. The building is located in the same vicinity (Fort) as the school, next to Sterling Cineplex.

In 2022, Meera Isaacs, the first woman principal of the Cathedral School, retired after 26 years. The new principal is Sonal Parmar.

=== School badge ===
In 1923 the Cathedral Schools and the Scottish School were amalgamated to form The Anglo-Scottish Education Society. Miss Whitfield, the Principal of the Girls' School, wanted a badge which was representative of both elements of the Society: Anglican and Scottish. A badge was designed in which the Bishop's Mitre represented the Anglican side, while the Scottish neighbours were symbolised by the white diagonal cross of St. Andrew.

== Academics and curriculum ==
The Cathedral & John Connon School is affiliated with the Council for the Indian School Certificate Examinations (CISCE), and its students appear for the council's ISC, IB (Grade 12) and IGCSE, ICSE (Grade 10) examinations. English is the medium of instruction. Hindi is taught as a second language, and Marathi or Sanskrit are taught as third languages.

A Hindustan Times report of 2013 ranked it as the best ICSE and ISC school in the country. It now offers the IBDP programme and IGCSE programme, as well.

== Cathedral Model United Nations (Symposium) ==
The Cathedral Model United Nations is run entirely by the school's student body over a period of three days, where students assume the roles of delegates representing countries. From a start in 1996 - the first CMUN had only one committee (Asia and Pacific Council), it has grown into an event with over 700 delegates attending. CMUN 2007 was the first to have delegates from outside Mumbai. Schools like Mayo College, La Martiniere Calcutta, St. James' School, Doon School, Modern School Barakhamba Road, and others attended the conference. 2011 featured the first international delegates from Rato Bangala School from Nepal and Aitchinson College, Pakistan.

== Clubs ==
The Cathedral and John Connon School has 4 clubs for students to enroll in. Enrollment in a club is required for all students in the Senior school (8th - 12th grade, for both curricula).

1. International Award for Young People (IAYP) - Cambridge International's way of offering the Duke of Edinburgh's International Award to students in Indian schools. The Cathedral and John Connon School offers a variety of trips and camps to suburbs of Mumbai city which often include multiple hikes and other adventures. No application is required to join this club, any student of the school may join.
2. Full Steam Ahead (FSA) - A STEAM club for scientifically inclined students involving a variety of engaging science experiences including visits to the Nehru Science Centre in Mumbai as well as a series of lectures by scientific professionals after school. Additionally, the school's science departments organize engaging experiments and scientific demonstrations for students. This club requires students to complete an application and offers a limited number of seats.
3. Symposium - The club responsible for organizing CMUN, it also allows the school to partake in various other Model United Nations across the country and the world. Delegates have been sent for the Harvard Model United Nations in Dubai as well as Cambridge. Students of the school must undergo a series of interviews by the club's administration, which consists of twelfth grade students.
4. Nature Club - The Nature Club is a student organization that fosters a connection with the natural world through various activities. The club aims to educate students about the significance of environmental protection and inspire them to participate in efforts to restore damaged ecosystems. All students are permitted to join the club, no application is required to join.

== House system ==
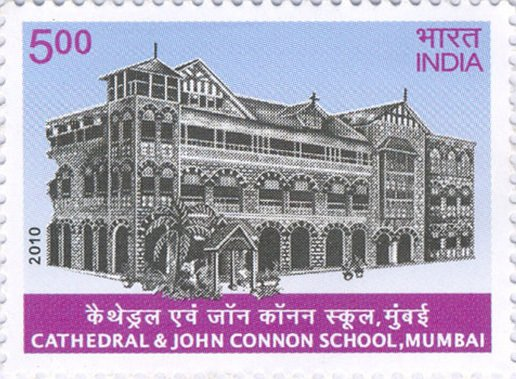
Stamp of India 2010 Cathedral - John Connon School Mumbai

There are four houses in the school - Barham, Palmer, Savage and Wilson - named after Barham (A. Canon), James Palmer (Bishop in Bombay), Arthur Savage and Percival Wilson, the founders of the Cathedral School and the John Connon School. The House System serves as the centre of school life, with students from the houses competing at sports, games and other co-curricular activities, primarily divided into 2 categories- Cultural and Sports which include a plethora of activities.

There was also another house, that was brown in color, called Kuruvilla that was later disbanded and students were distributed amongst the houses available since it made more sense to have four houses in order to keep competitions easier.

== Notable alumni ==
- Dhananjaya Y. Chandrachud, former Chief Justice of India
- Srikant Datar, Dean of Harvard Business School
- Kiara Advani, Actress
- Tara Deshpande, Indian actress, author, and food personality
- Siddhartha Basu, TV Director and Producer
- Rahul Bajaj, chairman emeritus, Bajaj Group
- Mandira Bedi, Actress
- Homi J. Bhabha, Father of the Indian nuclear programme
- Zulfikar Ali Bhutto, 9th Prime Minister of Pakistan
- Rahul Bose, Indian film actor, director, screenwriter
- Milind Deora, Indian politician and former Union Minister
- Jamshyd Godrej, Industrialist and founder of the Godrej Group
- Muhammad Ali Jinnah, Father of the Nation of Pakistan, Pakistan's first Governor-General, and leader of the All-India Muslim League
- Karisma Kapoor, Actress
- Durga Khote, Veteran Marathi & Hindi Film, Theater Actress and Producer
- Anand Mahindra, Industrialist and Chairman of Mahindra & Mahindra
- Rakesh Maria, Senior Indian Police Service officer and former Commissioner of the Mumbai Police
- Sandeep Mathrani, CEO of WeWork
- Khalid Mohamed, Film director and critic
- Ehsaan Noorani, Musician, Shankar–Ehsaan–Loy fame
- Salman Rushdie, Author
- Jehangir Sabavala, Painter
- Rajdeep Sardesai, Indian news anchor, journalist, and author
- Ranvir Shah, Cultural Activist and Philanthropist
- J. R. D. Tata, Tata Group
- Nusli Wadia, Chairman of the Wadia Group, son of Neville Wadia and Dina Wadia, grandson of Muhammad Ali Jinnah and Rattanbai Jinnah
- Fareed Zakaria, Indian-American author, political scientist, and CNN journalist
- Cyrus Broacha, Indian TV anchor, theatre personality, comedian, political satirist, columnist, podcaster and author
- Cyrus Mistry, Sixth Chairman of the Tata Group
- Gautam Singhania, Chairman of Raymond Group
- Ameesha Patel, Actress
- Adi Godrej, Industrialist
- Amyra Dastur, Actress

== Incidents ==
=== 2007 Expulsion Case ===
In July 2007, a 12-year-old Class VII student was rusticated from the school following high-profile privacy violation within the school grounds. The disciplinary action was initiated after the student used a mobile phone camera to illicitly record a classmate in the nude during a weekend event and subsequently circulated the imagery within the school premises. Due to the sensitive nature of the privacy breach and the involvement of minors, the administration enforced immediate rustication to maintain institutional safety and discipline.

=== 2018 Expulsion Case ===
In August 2018, the school issued an expulsion notice to a 13 year old Class VIII studdent following allegations of misbehaviour. According to school records presented during subsequent proceedings, the administration's decision was triggered after the student accumulated three institutional disciplinary warnings, known internally as "Pink Cards." The final infractions alleged by the school included throwing a shoe at a campus counselor and non-compliance with the principal's directive. The student's parents contested the expulsion by filing a writ petition in the Bombay High Court, stating that the child had been diagnosed with Attention Deficit Hyperactivity Disorder (ADHD) and was being unfairly targeted without adequate institutional accommodation. During the hearings, the Bombay High Court bench observed that while the student demonstrated high academic capability, continuing education within an adversarial environment would not serve the child's best interests. In September 2018, both parties reached an amicable mutual settlement before the High Court. Under the terms of the court-sanctioned agreement, the parents consented to withdraw their child from the institution, while The Cathedral and John Connon School agreed to officially rescind the expulsion notice, expunge the disciplinary record from the student's file, and actively assist the family in securing mid-term placement at an alternative IB school.

== See also ==
- List of schools in Mumbai
- List of the oldest schools in the world
