= Louis Mylne =

Louis George Mylne (1843 – 1921) was the Bishop of Bombay from 1876 until 1897.

== Career ==
Born into a colonial family, Mylne was educated at Merchiston Castle School, Edinburgh and Corpus Christi College, Oxford before being ordained in 1867. After a curacy in North Moreton he became a Tutor at Keble College, Oxford before elevation to the episcopate. After 21 years he returned to the United Kingdom, taking incumbencies in Alvechurch and Marlborough. His The Times obituary noted that although he

"belonged to the older school of high churchmen, he was able to work harmoniously with men within and without the Church whose opinions did not agree with his own”

== Works ==
A prolific author, his works include:

- "English Church Life in India", 1881
- "Corporate Life of the Church in India", 1884
- "Counsels and Principles of the Lambeth Conference of 1888", 1889
- "Sermons preached in Bombay", 1889
- "Churchmen and the Higher Criticism", 1893
- "Hopes for Reunion", 1896
- "The Hidden Riches of Secret Places (in Mankind and the Church)", 1907
- "Mission to Hindus", 1908
- "The Holy Trinity", 1916

== Family ==
Mylne married at St. Thomas Cathedral, Bombay, on 27 December 1880, Amy Frederica Moultrie, daughter of G. W. Moultrie, Agent of the Bank of Bengal in Bombay.

Church of England titles
Preceded by Henry Alexander Douglas	Bishop of Bombay; 1876 – 1898	Succeeded by James Macarthur
