= Richard Acland (bishop) =

British soldier and Anglican bishop (1881–1954)

Acland c. 1930

Richard Dyke Acland (3 October 1881 – 4 January 1954) was a British soldier and, later, an Anglican bishop.

He was the son of the Reverend Henry Dyke Acland, grandson of Sir Thomas Dyke Acland, 10th Baronet, and his wife Adelaide Clementina Hart Davis, daughter of Richard Vaughan Davis. Dyke Acland was educated at Bedford School and at Keble College, Oxford and graduated with a Master of Arts. He served in the 1st Volunteer Battalion, Oxfordshire Light Infantry and reached the rank of captain.

In 1905, Acland was appointed curate of St Mary, Slough and held this post until 1911. He became a missionary for the Society for the Propagation of the Gospel in the following year in Ahmednagar, India. He was the society's secretary between 1925 and 1929, and served as Bishop of Bombay until 1947. Acland took an interest in birds, and was a member of the Bombay Natural History Society and served as a vice president alongside J.F. Caius in 1943. In the latter year, he was decorated with the Kaisar-i-Hind Gold Medal. In 1948, he returned to England and was then assistant to the Bishop of Bath and Wells until his death in 1954.

Church of England titles
Preceded by Edwin James Palmer	Bishop of Bombay; 1929–1947	Succeeded by William Quinlan Lash
