= Thomas Wentworth Pym =

British clergyman (1885–1945)

Revd Canon Thomas Wentworth Pym
- Born: 10 August 1885
- Died: 20 July 1945 (aged 59)
- Education: Trinity College, Cambridge
- Occupations: Clergyman and theologian

Revd Canon Thomas Wentworth Pym DSO (1885 – 1945) was a prominent Church of England clergyman, theologian, and a Fellow of Balliol College, Oxford.

== Biography ==
The son of Rt Revd Walter Ruthven Pym, Bishop of Bombay, Thomas Wentworth Pym was born on 10 August 1885. He was educated at Bedford School, between 1895 and 1904, and at Trinity College, Cambridge, where he was appointed as Chaplain. He served during the First World War, between 1914 and 1918, as Assistant Chaplain-General to the Third Army. He was appointed as an Honorary Chaplain to King George V in 1922, as a Canon of Southwark Cathedral in 1925, as a Canon of Bristol Cathedral in 1929, and elected as Chaplain and Fellow in Theology at Balliol College, Oxford in 1932.

He was married to the classicist and educator Dora Pym. The grandfather of BBC journalist Hugh Pym and father of author Christopher Pym, Revd Canon Thomas Wentworth Pym was invested as a Companion of the Distinguished Service Order in 1917. He died on 20 July 1945, three days after his brother, Leslie Pym MP.

== Publications ==
- Papers from Picardy, 1917
- Psychology and the Christian Life, 1921
- Mark's Account of Jesus, 1921
- More Psychology and the Christian Life, 1925
- Spiritual Direction, 1928
- The Place of Sex in Life, 1928
- A Parson's Dilemmas, 1930
- Sharing, 1933
- Conduct, 1933
- Our Personal Ministry, 1938
- Sex and Sense, 1938
