= Thomas Carr (bishop) =

- Diocese: Anglican Diocese of Bombay
- Installed: 1837
- Term ended: 1851

Personal details
- Born: 1788
- Died: 5 September 1859 (aged 70–71)

Thomas Carr (1788 – 5 September 1859) was the inaugural Bishop of Bombay between 1837 and 1851.

== Early life and career ==
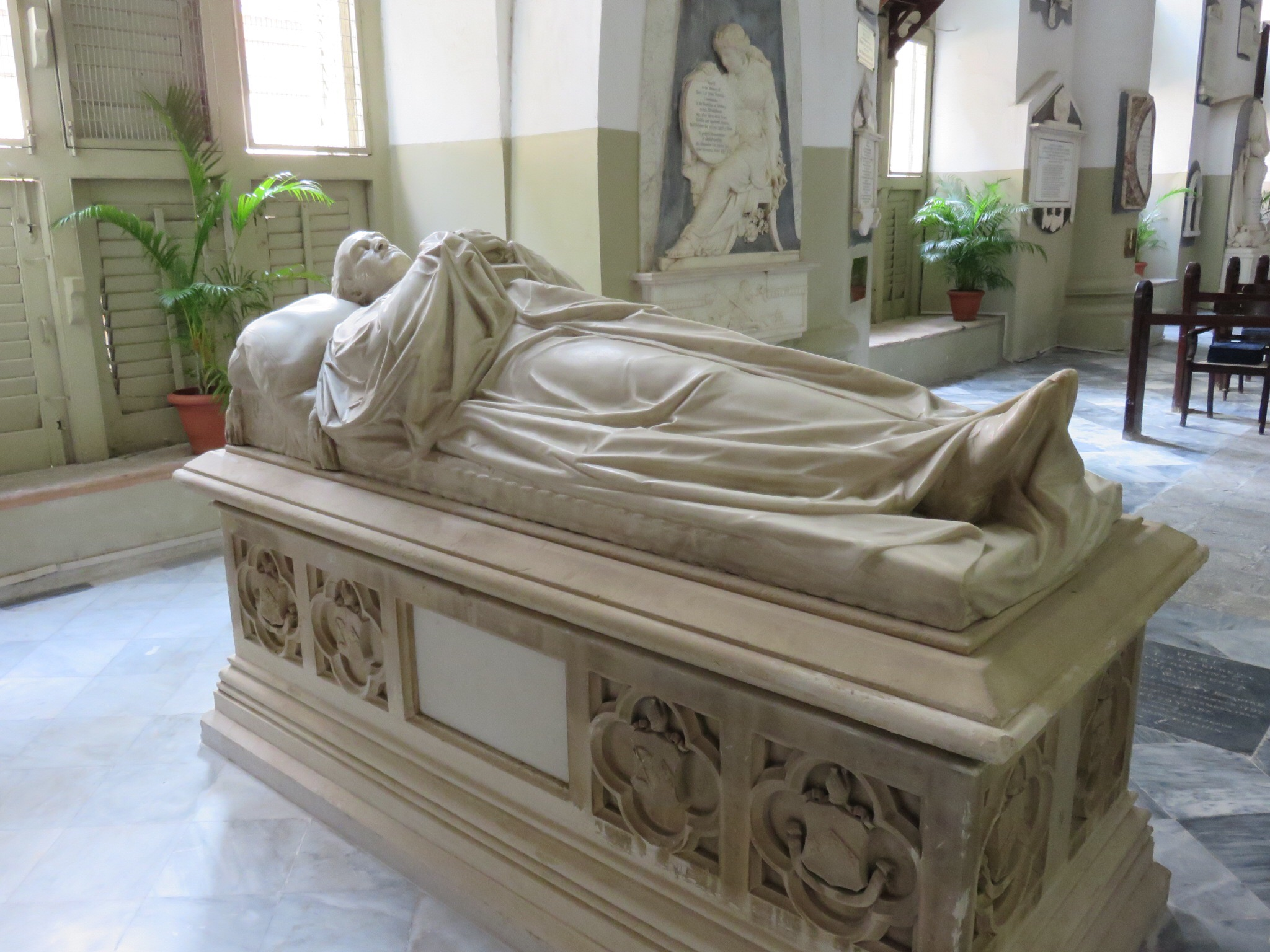
Memorial to Bishop Thomas Carr located in St. Thomas Cathedral, Mumbai

The son of Thomas Carr and Catherine Wilkinson, Carr was born in 1788. He was educated at St John's College, Cambridge, matriculating in 1809, graduating B.A. in 1813, and receiving the Lambeth degree of D.D. in 1831.

Chaplain in the service of the East India Company in 1817. Appointed to the archdeaconry of Bombay in 1833. Consecrated Bishop of Bombay at Lambeth Palace Chapel on 19 November 1837. Installed in Bombay 25 February 1838.

Rector of Bath Abbey between 1854 and 1859. Gave key evidence in a famous court case, that of Archdeacon Denison. He died at Bath, Somerset in 1859.

A monument to Carr, designed by British sculptor Matthew Noble, is located in St. Thomas Cathedral, Mumbai.

== Family ==
First marriage to Elizabeth Matilda Farrish on 19 May 1814 at Great St. Mary's, Cambridge.

- Elizabeth Catherine Carr (14 February 1815 – 11 January 1897) who married in 1835 the widower Rev. William Kew Fletcher, and left children.
- Frances Ellen Carr (28 July 1820 – 10 April 1900) who married in 1839 Sir John Awdry, and left children. As Lady Awdrey she died at Notton, Wiltshire on 10 April 1900, in her 80th year.
- Revd. William Carr, M.A.
- James Thomas Carr, MRCS, (29 September 1822 – 15 April 1847), a surgeon serving the Indian Medical Service, was lost at sea in the foundering of steam frigate Cleopatra in a cyclone off the Malabar Coast. A memorial to the loss of this ship and over 300 passengers and crew is located in St. Thomas Cathedral, Mumbai.

Later on 24 June 1831, a second marriage to Catherine Emily MacMahon.

- Mary Catherine Carr who in 1853 married firstly Vere Hobart, later Lord Hobart, Governor of Madras between 1872 and 1875. After Lord Hobarts death in 1875 she married secondly in 1879 Charles Coates a Doctor of Medicine.

Carr's grandson William Awdry was also consecrated a bishop serving in Southampton, Osaka and South Tokyo.

Church of England titles
New title	Bishop of Bombay; 1836–1851	Succeeded by John Harding
