= John Harding (bishop) =

John Harding (7 January 1805 – 18 June 1874) was an English clergyman, who served as Bishop of Bombay. He was the second Anglican bishop there, and held the post from 1851 to 1869, retiring in poor health.

== Life ==
He was son of William Harding, chief clerk in the transport office, and Mary Harrison Ackland, and was born in Queen Square, Bloomsbury, London, on 7 January 1805. He was educated at Westminster School, went on to Worcester College, Oxford, and graduated B.A. in Michaelmas term 1826 as a third-class man in lit. human., his name appearing in the same class list with three other future bishops, Samuel Wilberforce of Oxford, Eden of Moray and Ross, and Trower of Gibraltar. In 1829, he became curate of Wendy, Cambridgeshire. After some other ministerial engagements, he was appointed minister of Park Chapel, Chelsea, in 1834.

In 1836, Harding was appointed to the rectory of St. Andrew-by-the-Wardrobe and St Ann Blackfriars until 1851 when he ascended to the episcopate. William Romaine (died 1795), one of the early evangelical leaders, had been rector of this church; and Harding also was a strong evangelical. He was for some years secretary of the Pastoral Aid Society, and interested in religious societies following the evangelical line. He was selected by Archbishop Sumner for the see of Bombay, vacated by the resignation of Bishop Thomas Carr, and was consecrated in Lambeth Chapel on 10 August 1851. In the same year he proceeded B.D. and D.D. at Oxford. His views led him to look coldly on "brotherhoods" and other proposals of the High church party for missionary work in the diocese. He was an opponent of what are known as ritualism.

Failure of health led to Harding's return home on furlough in 1867, and he resigned his see in 1869. He settled at Ore, near Hastings, holding clerical meetings at his house for clergy of widely different views. He was a frequent preacher at St. Mary's-in-the-Castle, Hastings, of which his friend the Rev. T. Vores was incumbent. He died at Ore on 18 June 1874.

== Family ==
He married Mary, third daughter of W. Tebbs, esq., proctor in Doctors' Commons, but left no family.

Church of England titles
Preceded by Thomas Carr	Bishop of Bombay; 1851 – 1869	Succeeded by Henry Alexander Douglas
