= Brinda =

Brinda or Brindha may refer to:

- Vrinda (goddess) or Brinda, the holy basil in Hinduism
- Another name of the Hindu goddess Radha
- Brinda Karat (born 1947), Indian politician
- Brinda Parekh (born 1982), Indian model and actress
- Brindha Sivakumar, Indian singer
- Brinda Somaya (born 1949), Indian architect and urban conservationist
- T. Brinda (1912–1996), Carnatic music vocalist

== See also ==
- Vrindavan (lit. 'Vrinda's/Radha's Forest'), town in Uttar Pradesh, India
