= Hugh Pym =

British journalist and author (born 1959)

- Born: Hugh Ruthven Pym; 18 October 1959 (age 67); Malmesbury, Wiltshire, England
- Education: Cothill House; Marlborough College
- Alma mater: Christ Church, Oxford (BA)
- Occupation: Journalist
- Years active: 1986–present
- Employer: BBC
- Height: 6 ft 7 in (2.01 m)
- Title: Health editor of BBC News
- Spouse: Susan Neill
- Children: 3

Hugh Ruthven Pym (born 18 October 1959) is a British journalist and author. A financial and political journalist by origin, he currently works for BBC News as its health editor.

== Early life and education ==
Hugh Ruthven Pym was born on 18 October 1959 in Malmesbury, Wiltshire. He was educated at Marlborough College, a private school in Wiltshire. He went on to read Philosophy, Politics, and Economics at Christ Church, Oxford. He graduated with a Bachelor of Arts (BA) in 1981. He undertook post-graduate study in Broadcast Journalism at Falmouth College and gained a Certificate in Journalism.

His great-grandfather was Walter Pym, a bishop, and his great-uncle was Leslie Ruthven Pym, a Conservative MP, whose son was Francis Pym, Baron Pym, who was notably Secretary of State for Foreign Affairs during the Falklands War. His grandfather was Leslie's brother Thomas Wentworth Pym, a vicar. His mother was a member of the Clark family (who own Clarks Shoes, with Hugh being a minor shareholder).

== Career ==
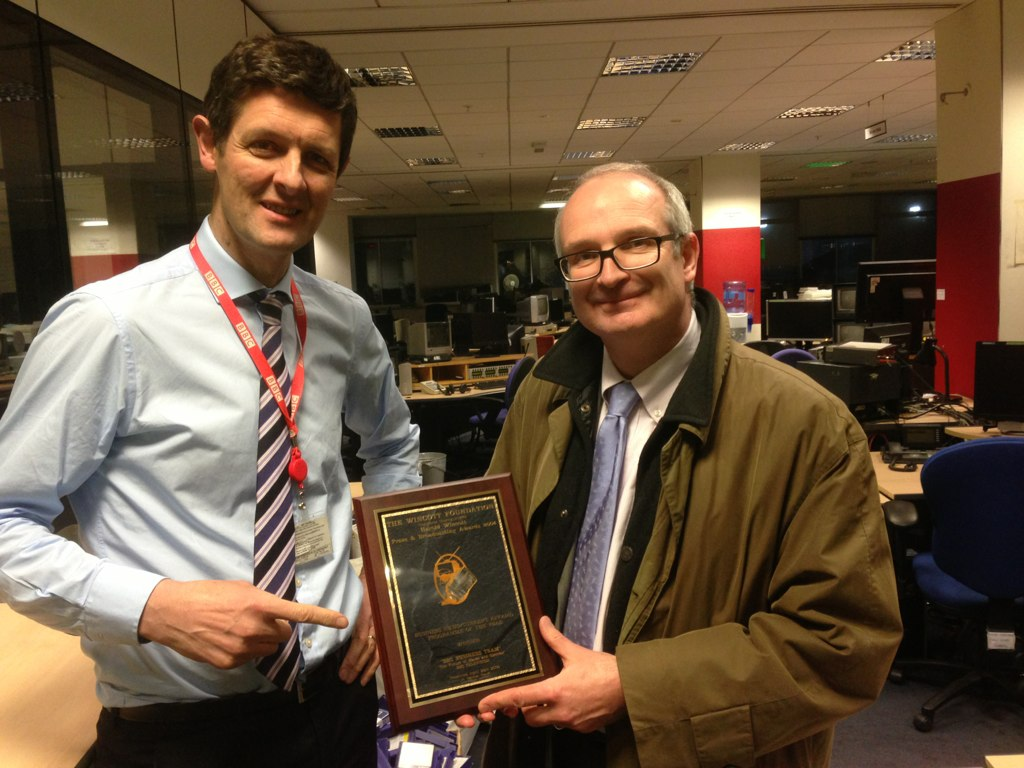
Pym (left) in 2013.

Pym began his career in radio at Viking Radio in Hull, and was a BBC Radio journalist from 1986 to 1987. He was the producer of Business Daily at Channel 4 from 1987 to 1988, a correspondent with ITN from 1988 to 1998, and a freelance broadcaster with British Sky Broadcasting from 1999 to 2000. He rejoined the BBC in 2001 after a spell of work at Sky News. He was a BBC special correspondent covering economics until 2008, when he took on the role of acting economics editor during the maternity leave of Stephanie Flanders. Following her return, he became the BBC's chief economics correspondent, a newly created role. When she left the BBC in late 2013 he took over again as acting editor. In March 2014 he was appointed as health editor.

Pym has published What Happened? And Other Questions About the Credit Crunch, a book co-written with Nick Kochan, and a study of Gordon Brown's first year in the office of Chancellor of the Exchequer, also co-written with Kochan. His latest book is Inside the Banking Crisis (published by Bloomsbury in 2014).

Pym was the recipient of the 2020 British Journalism Review Charles Wheeler award in recognition of his coverage of the COVID-19 pandemic. It was bestowed upon him in a ceremony on 16 November, when a keynote speech was delivered by Sir Peter Bazalgette. On 8 December, Pym tweeted that the second person to get the Pfizer-BioNTech COVID-19 vaccine was a man named William Shakespeare from Warwickshire. The tweet went viral due to the man's name and home county being the same as that of the renowned playwright William Shakespeare.

== Parliamentary candidacy ==
In the 2001 general election Pym stood as the Liberal Democrat parliamentary candidate in the North Wiltshire constituency. He achieved 20,212 votes but lost to the Conservative James Gray.

General election 2001: North Wiltshire
Party	Candidate	Votes	%	±%
Conservative	James Gray	24,090	45.5	+1.7
Liberal Democrats	Hugh Pym	20,212	38.2	+0.4
Labour	Joanne Garton	7,556	14.3	+0.1
UKIP	Neil Dowdney	1,090	2.1	+1.4
Majority		3,878	7.3	+1.3
Turnout		52,948	67.3	−7.6
Conservative hold		Swing	+0.7	

== Personal life ==
Pym is married to Dumbarton-born Susan Neill. He has three children – two sons and one daughter – and is an Elder in the Church of Scotland. Hugh is also a keen fan of the Scotland rugby team.

== Publications ==
- The Guinness Affair: Anatomy of a Scandal (London, Christopher Helm Publishers, 1987, ISBN 978-0-7470-2605-1), with Nick Kochan
- Unit and Investment Trusts (Allied Dunbar Money Guides) (London, Sweet & Maxwell, 1988, ISBN 978-0-85121-383-5)
- Gordon Brown: The First Year in Power (London, Bloomsbury, 1998, ISBN 978-0-7475-3701-4), with Nick Kochan
- Inside the Banking Crisis (London, Bloomsbury, 2014, ISBN 978-1-4729-0-2870)

Media offices
Preceded by Stephanie Flanders	Acting Economics Editor: BBC News; 2013–2014	Succeeded by Robert Peston
New title	Health Editor: BBC News; 2014–present	Incumbent
