= Walter Pym =

Walter Pym may refer to:

- Walter Pym (bishop) (1856–1908), English bishop
- Walter Pym (actor) (1905–1980), Australian actor and producer
