= Henry Douglas (bishop) =

The Right Reverend Henry Alexander Douglas

Bishop of Bombay
- In office 1869–1875
- Preceded by: John Harding
- Succeeded by: Louis George Mylne

Dean of Cape Town
- In office 1866–1869
- Preceded by: William Newman
- Succeeded by: Charles Barnett-Clarke

Personal details
- Born: Henry Alexander Douglas; 21 February 1821
- Died: 13 December 1875 (aged 54)
- Spouse: Eliza Hoskins (after 1849)
- Relations: John Douglas (brother); Sir William Douglas, 4th Baronet (grandfather); Charles Douglas, 6th Marquess of Queensberry (uncle); John Douglas, 7th Marquess of Queensberry (uncle)
- Education: Sherborne School; Balliol College, Oxford

Henry Alexander Douglas (22 February 1821 – 13 December 1875) was the third Bishop of Bombay from 1869 to 1875.

== Early life ==
Born into a noble family he was a son of Henry Alexander Douglas of Lockerbie and Elizabeth Dalzell, who both died in 1837. Among his siblings were John Douglas, 7th Premier of Queensland and Robert Johnstone-Douglas (father of Arthur Johnstone-Douglas). His father was the third son of Sir William Douglas, 4th Baronet of Kelhead, and was a brother of the sixth and seventh Marquesses of Queensberry.

Douglas was educated at Sherborne and Balliol College, Oxford.

== Career ==
He was Vicar of Abbotsley (1849-55), then Dean of Cape Town before his elevation to the episcopate, he was a "moderate high churchman". He died on 13 December 1875 and his papers published posthumously.

His successor as Dean of Cape Town was a long serving Charles Barnett-Clarke.

== Personal life ==
On 20 November 1849, Douglas married Eliza Hoskins, daughter of James Hoskins. Together, they were the parents of:

- Margaret Douglas (c. 1854–1943), who died unmarried.
- Catherine Mary Grey Douglas (c. 1857–1942), who married the Rev. Francis Ainger in 1894.
- Archibald Charles Douglas (1861–1939), who married Betty McClelland, a daughter of Andrew Simpson McClelland, in 1896.
- Katherine Helen Douglas (1864–1953), who died unmarried.

Douglas died on 13 December 1875 at age 54.

Anglican Church of Southern Africa titles
Preceded by William Newman	Dean of Cape Town; 1866 – 1869	Succeeded by Charles Barnett-Clarke
Anglican Communion titles
Preceded by John Harding	Bishop of Bombay; 1869 – 1875	Succeeded by Louis George Mylne
