= Bill Lash =

William Quinlan Lash was the Bishop of Bombay from 1947 to 1961.

Lash was born on 5 February 1905 and educated at Tonbridge School and Emmanuel College, Cambridge. Ordained in 1929 his first post was as a curate at St Mary's Portsea, Portsmouth.

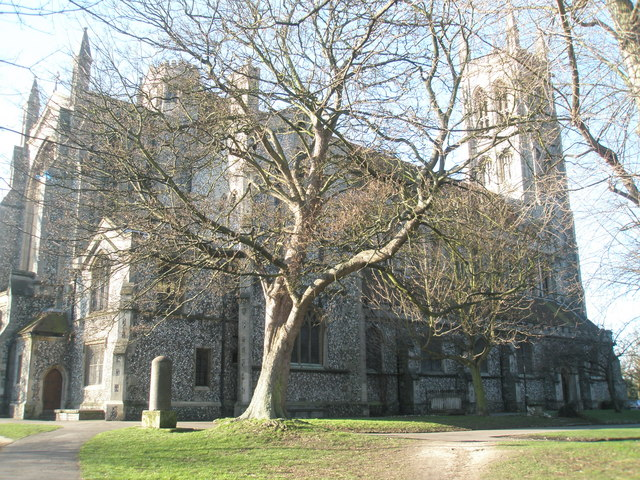
St Mary's Portsea

He then emigrated to India, where he was Vicar of Poona until his ordination to the episcopate. In India he was a founder member of the Christa Prema Seva Sangha, which sought to live Christianity in a way that was faithful to Indian culture. A noted author, upon return to England, he served as an Assistant Bishop of Truro and Vicar of St Clement. After retiring from Truro diocese he went to live with the Society of St Francis (an Anglican Franciscan order) at their mother house, Hilfield Friary in Dorset, where he was a much-loved member of the community. Here he continued to exercise a ministry of counsel and encouragement until his death in 1986. He is buried in the cemetery there.

Church of England titles
Preceded by Richard Dyke Acland	Bishop of Bombay; 1947–1961	Succeeded by Christopher Robinson
