= Brinda Somaya =

Indian architect and urban conservationist

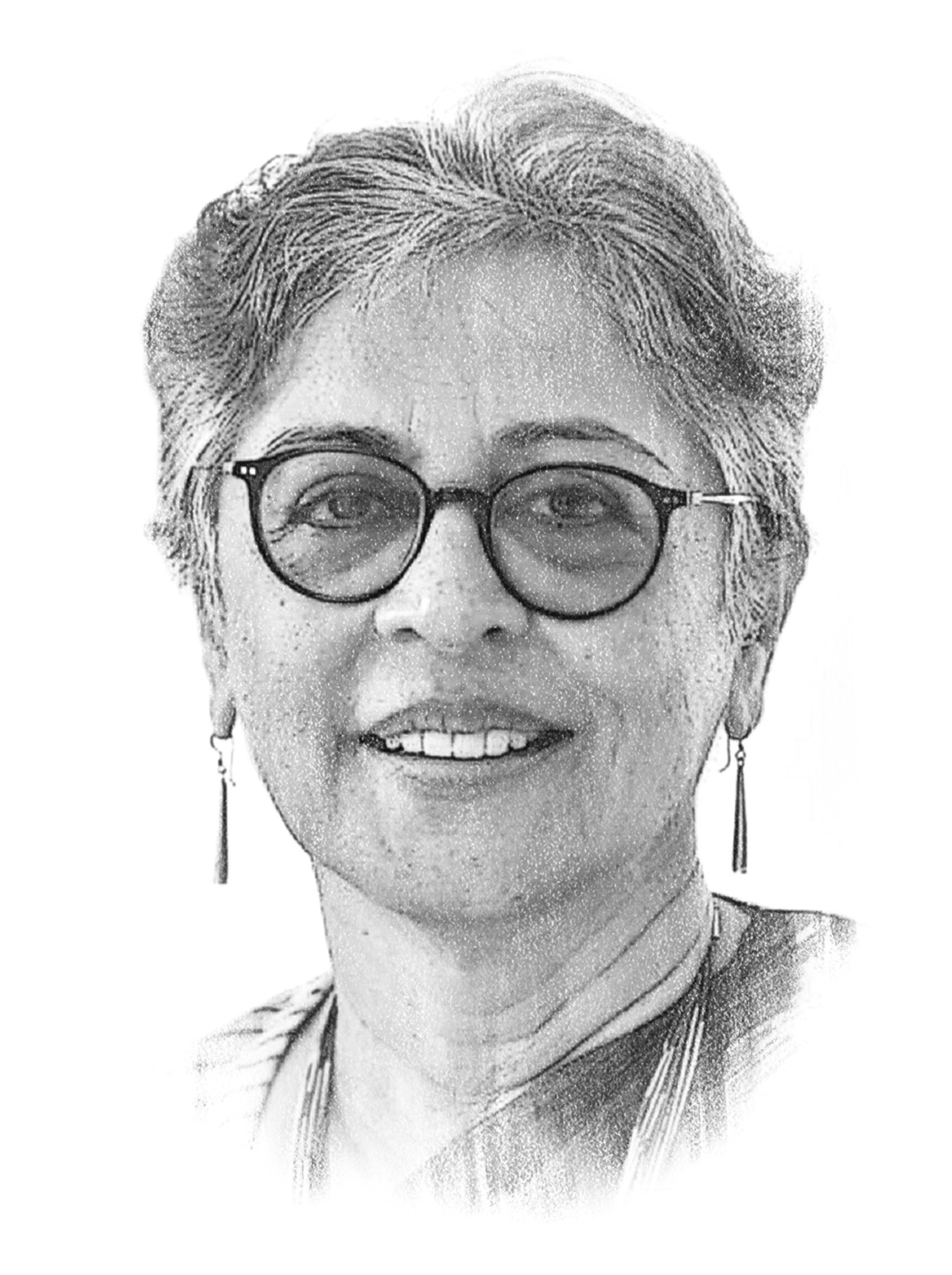
- Brinda Somaya drawing
- Born: 28 June 1949 (age 77)
- Education: Smith College, Mumbai University
- Occupation: Architect
- Practice: Somaya and Kalappa Consultants Pvt Ltd

Brinda Somaya (born 28 June 1949) is an Indian architect and urban conservationist.

== Early life and education ==
Somaya was born on 28 June 1949 to K. M. Chinnappa and Ganavati Chinnappa. She later joined the Cathedral & John Connon School's science program. In 1966, Somaya won an American Field Service International Scholarship to study in the United States (North Carolina). In 1967, she returned to India and completed her Bachelor of Architecture from Sir J. J. School of Architecture in Mumbai, graduating in 1971. Somaya chose to return to the U.S. and joined Smith College in Northampton, Massachusetts, where she graduated in 1973 with a Masters of Arts degree. She attended a short design course at Cornell University in 1972.

== Career ==
Somaya began her architectural practice in 1978 in Mumbai, India. Her firm's first office was in the back of her garden. From 1978 to 1981 she was joined by her sister Ranjini Kalappa, also an architect. After her sister left for Holland, she worked on her own. Somaya has travelled to the rural parts of India, from where she has got knowledge and inspiration for vernacular architecture. One such example is The Nalanda International Schools in Vadodara where she reflects the vernacular architecture by using the locally available resources and techniques, pergolas and courtyard. She reflects the Indian ethos in her architecture, her designs are called both traditional and sustainable Her work includes corporate, industrial and institutional campuses and extends to public spaces, which she has rebuilt and reinvented as pavements, parks and plazas. Some of these campuses include Tata Consultancy Services, Banyan Park, Mumbai; Nalanda International School, Vadodara; and Zensar Technologies, Pune. Her firm won the competition for the Restoration and Enhancement of the historic Louis Kahn Buildings of the Indian Institute of Management, Ahmedabad as well as the new Academic Buildings of the Indian Institute of Technology.

She is currently the Chairperson of Board of Governors for School of Planning and Architecture, Vijayawada and has built more than 200 projects in a span of 40 years.

In 1999, Somaya was a founder trustee for the HECAR Foundation in India. In 2000, she served as the chairperson and the curator for the Women in Architecture 2000 Plus-Conference and exhibition on the works of the South Asian Women Architects, a global showcase platform for women architects from India, Bangladesh, Sri Lanka, Australia and Pakistan.

== Awards and honours ==
- 1994, she was awarded the Indian Institute of Architects' Kitply Award for Conservation for the Cathedral and John Connon Middle School.
- 1998, she was awarded the Indian Institute of Architects' Kitply Award for Conservation for the Cathedral and John Connon Senior School.
- 2004, she was awarded the UNESCO Asia-Pacific Heritage award for the restoration of the St. Thomas' Cathedral in Mumbai.
- 2006, Leading European Architects Forum award winner for the new Nalanda Schools Campus in Baroda
- 2007, she was awarded the Wienerberger Golden Architect Award as first woman ever for lifetime achievement.
- 2008, she was awarded the Vassilis Sgoutas Prize for the rehabilitation of Bhadi Village.
- 2019, she was awarded the AYA JK Cement Award for Indian State Architecture for the Jubilee Church at Navi, Mumbai.
- 2013, she was chosen as one of the "100 GLOBAL PUBLIC INTEREST DESIGN" persons working at the intersection of design and service globally.
- 2012, she was the recipient of an honorary doctorate from her alma mater, Smith College.
- 2014, she was awarded the Indian Institute of Architects – Baburao Mhatre Gold Medal for Lifetime Achievement.
- 2015, she was honoured as the Distinguished Professor by the Indian Education Society's College of Architecture, Mumbai.
- 2017 she got an honourable mention in the Arcasia Awards for the restoration and the preservation of Rajabai Clock Tower and University library building, Mumbai.
- 2017, she was awarded the Grohe NDTV Design and Architecture Award for Outstanding Industry Contribution
- 2019, the Somaya and Kalappa Consultants won the competition for the Restoration and Enhancement of the historic Louis Kahn Buildings of the Indian Institute of Management, Ahmedabad in 2019.
- She was appointed an Andrew Dickson White Professor-at-Large at Cornell University from 2017 to 2023.

== Notable projects ==
=== Bhadli Village of Bhuj ===
Bhadli Village is located 40 km northwest of Bhuj. The village was destroyed by 6.9 Richter scale earthquake. Somaya included all the villagers for the reconstruction to restore the unique identity of the village. She involved the Muslims family and assigned them for making intricate Bandhani (tie and dye-a fabric work), Patelbhai who were interested in the ecology of the village and employed skilled engineers to create a water reservoir to collect rain water. Her main focus for this project was to design in a way which promoted a healthy and hygienic environment. She designed the houses in a way which barred the dust and intense heat of the desert. There were minimized openings and concrete jaalis were used for the exchange of air for minimum sunlight and dust. Also, a cluster of 5-6 houses was made to create a close-knit community for the villagers. A separate space was created for the livestock and precious possessions. To restore fear in people, a 3 RCC plinth Beam was placed: one in the sill, one in the lintel and one in the roof base. The project maximized reusing the materials by reusing the debris, doors and windows. The trust agreed to provide materials while the labour was provided by the villagers so that the villagers.

A school in Bhadli was rebuilt in 2002, a primary co ed school with 194 students and 6 teachers. A temporary school was built initially so that the students could continue their education. Somaya worked closely with villagers and used locally available materials to save money.

=== St. Thomas Cathedral ===
St. Thomas Cathedral, the oldest Anglican Church in Mumbai was a 298-year structure when Somaya was contacted. The cathedral had a leak on the concrete slab of the flat roof. She did not have many photographs for reference so had to rely on a black and white image of the original roof. A Grade-I Heritage Structure was successfully restored for which Somaya won the UNESCO Asia-Pacific Heritage Award.

=== Nalanda International School ===
Built on 12 acres of land near Vadodara in Gujarat, Nalanda International School started its construction in 2003. 4 acres of land was separated for the sports and games facilities. Somaya reflected the tradition of Jaipur in her project by using the local brick produced by the local masons. She designed the projects to ensure peace and tranquillity to the students as well as for sustainability.

=== Other projects ===
- Nalanda International School, Vadodara
- Goa Institute of Management, Goa
- Birla Institute of Technology and Sciences, Pilani
- Zensar Technology Limited, Pune
- TCS House, Mumbai
- St. Thomas Cathedral, Mumbai
- Rehabilitation of Bhadli Village along with its School and community Center, Bhuj
- Restoration of the Indian Institute of Management –Ahmedabad (IIM-A) Louis Kahn Campus

== Personal life ==
Somaya is married to Anand Somaya, a cardiac surgeon. They completed 40 years of marriage in 2014.
