= Masters of Money =

- Title screenshot
- Genre: Documentary
- Written by: Stephanie Flanders
- Directed by: Tristan Quinn; Martin Small
- Presented by: Stephanie Flanders
- Country of origin: United Kingdom
- Original language: English
- No. of series: 1
- No. of episodes: 3

Production
- Executive producer: Dominic Crossley-Holland
- Producers: Tristan Quinn; Martin Small
- Running time: 58 minutes
- Production company: BBC Productions

Original release
- Network: BBC Two; BBC HD
- Release: 17 September – 1 October 2012

Masters of Money is a 2012 British documentary series produced by the BBC. The programme premiered on BBC Two from 17 September to 1 October 2012 and is presented by Stephanie Flanders, who was then the BBC economics editor. Dominic Crossley-Holland served as the executive producer of the programme. The Open University worked in partnership with the BBC to produce the series.

The series explores the lives of John Maynard Keynes, Friedrich Hayek, and Karl Marx, and their influence on modern economics. Keynes is known for Keynesian economics and as an early pioneer of macroeconomics, Hayek is part of the Austrian School of economics, and Marx is known for communism and the theories that are collectively called Marxism. Flanders speculates how each would have reacted to the Great Recession, and what they would have proposed to resolve it.

The series consists of three episodes, each an hour long. The first episode, Keynes, premiered on 17 September 2012, the second episode, Hayek, on 24 September, and the third and final episode, Marx, on 1 October.

== Reception ==
John Crace's review of the first episode for The Guardian was largely positive, stating that "Flanders pitched it just about right; enough rigour to make it worthwhile, not too much jargon to make it a snooze." He praised Flanders' presenting and enthusiasm for the subject, commenting that she was "the ideal guide to an hour's night in front of the TV," but was disappointed by the lack of any discussion on "whether economics is a scientific subject with any predictive value." Tom Sutcliffe of The Independent wrote that programme was a "clever, responsive bit of commissioning," but was critical of the "impartiality" of the series. Flanders' reluctance as a journalist to take a stance on the economic theories covered leaves the viewer, according to Sutcliffe, "more knowledgeable but just as confused as before."

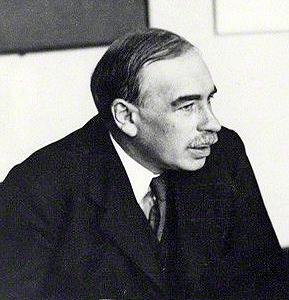
John Maynard Keynes

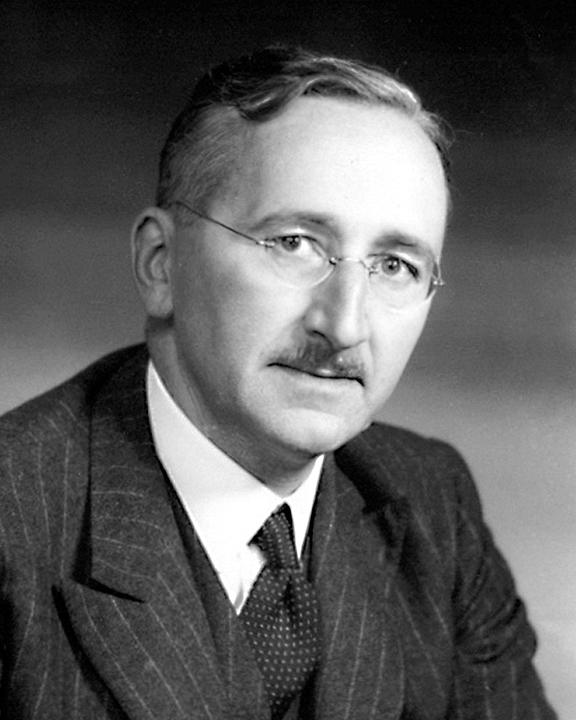
Friedrich Hayek

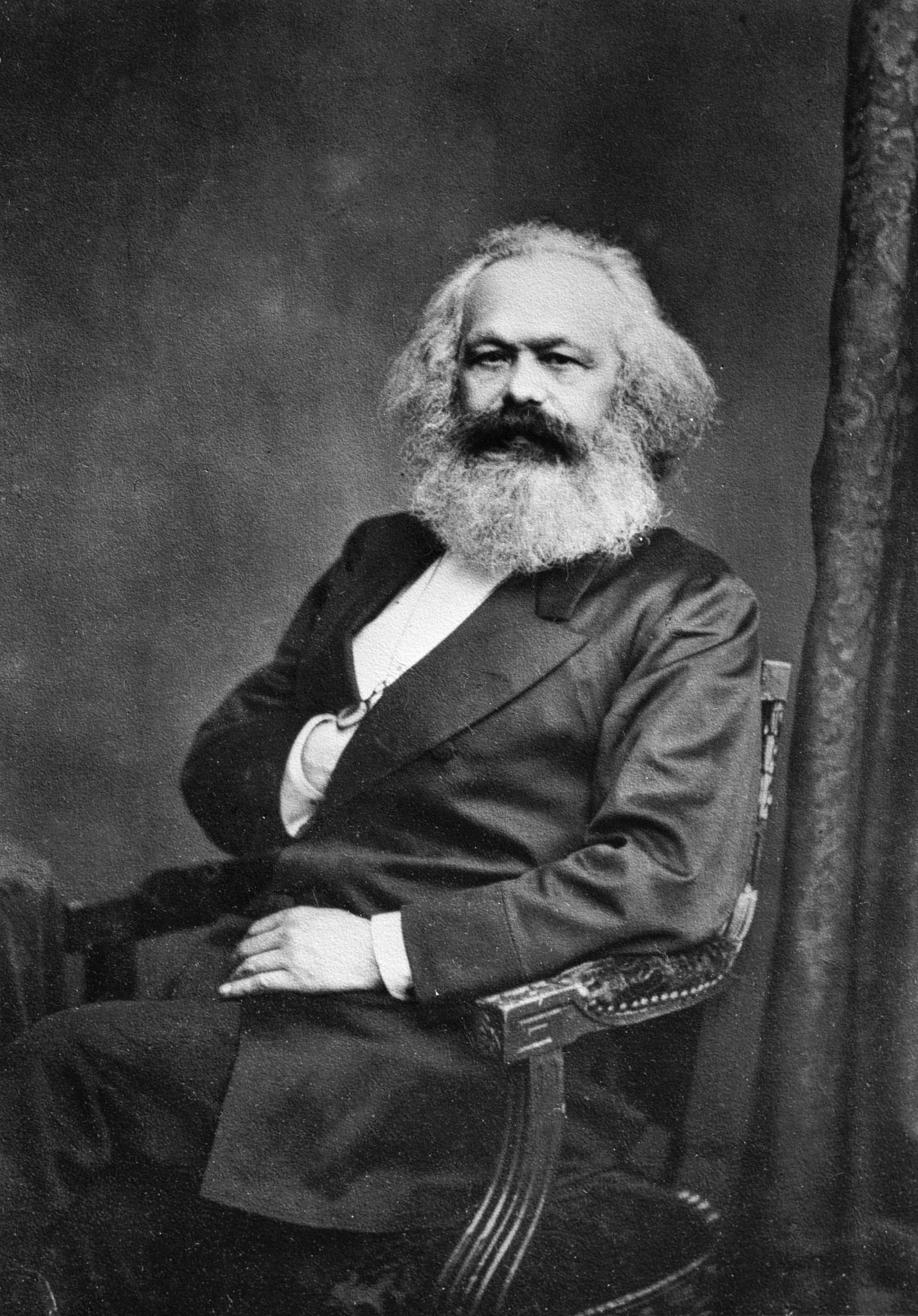
Karl Marx
