= James Palmer (bishop) =

British Anglican bishop (1869–1954)

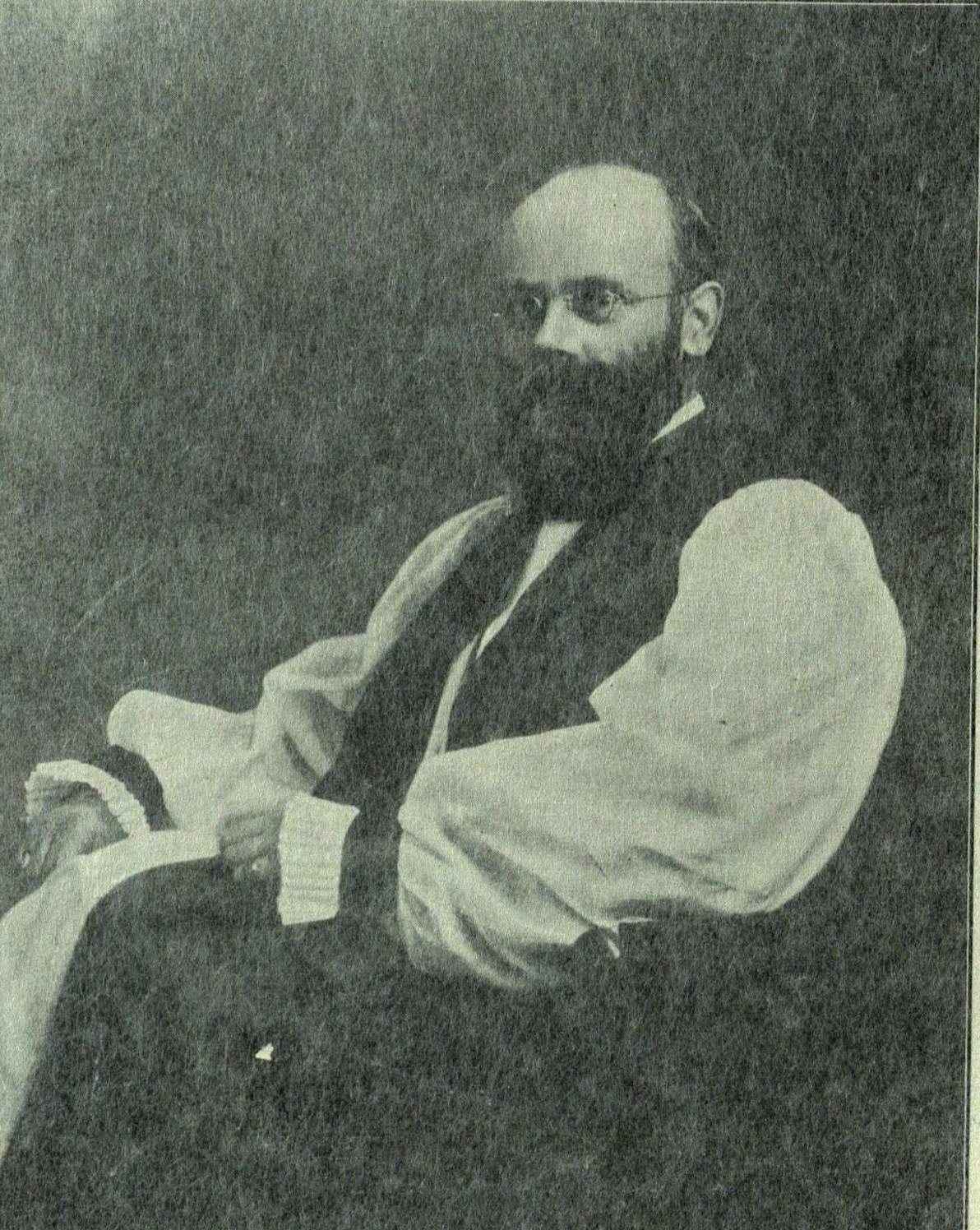

Edwin James Palmer (called James; 1869–1954) was the Bishop of Bombay from 1908 until 1929. He was born in 1869 into a noted family and educated at Winchester College and Balliol College, Oxford. Made deacon in 1896 and ordained priest in 1898, he was elected a Fellow of his old college and was Tutor and Chaplain there until his appointment to the episcopate where (according to his Times obituary) he was

moderate in opinion and accommodating in all things except where basic beliefs and principles were involved.

He was consecrated a bishop on Ascension Day 1908 (28 May), by Randall Davidson, Archbishop of Canterbury, at Southwark Cathedral. He returned to England in 1929 and became Assistant Bishop of Gloucester until his death. A prolific author, in retirement he continued to serve the church until his death on 28 March 1954 and his extensive papers are preserved for posterity within the Lambeth Palace Library.

Palmer was the subject of a clerihew which acquired some currency at Oxford:

"J. A. Smith Said Christianity was a myth;
When he grew calmer
They sent for Mr Palmer."

Church of England titles
Preceded by Walter Ruthven Pym	Bishop of Bombay; 1908 – 1929	Succeeded by Richard Dyke Acland
