= Cleopatra (1839) =

History
- Name: Cleopatra
- Owner: East India Company
- Builder: Thomas Pitcher of Northfleet
- Launched: 1839
- Out of service: 15 April 1847
- Fate: Sunk by tropical cyclone off Malabar Coast

General characteristics
- Tons burthen: 760 bm
- Length: 178 ft 5 in (54.38 m)
- Beam: 31 ft (9.4 m)
- Speed: 9-10 knots under sail

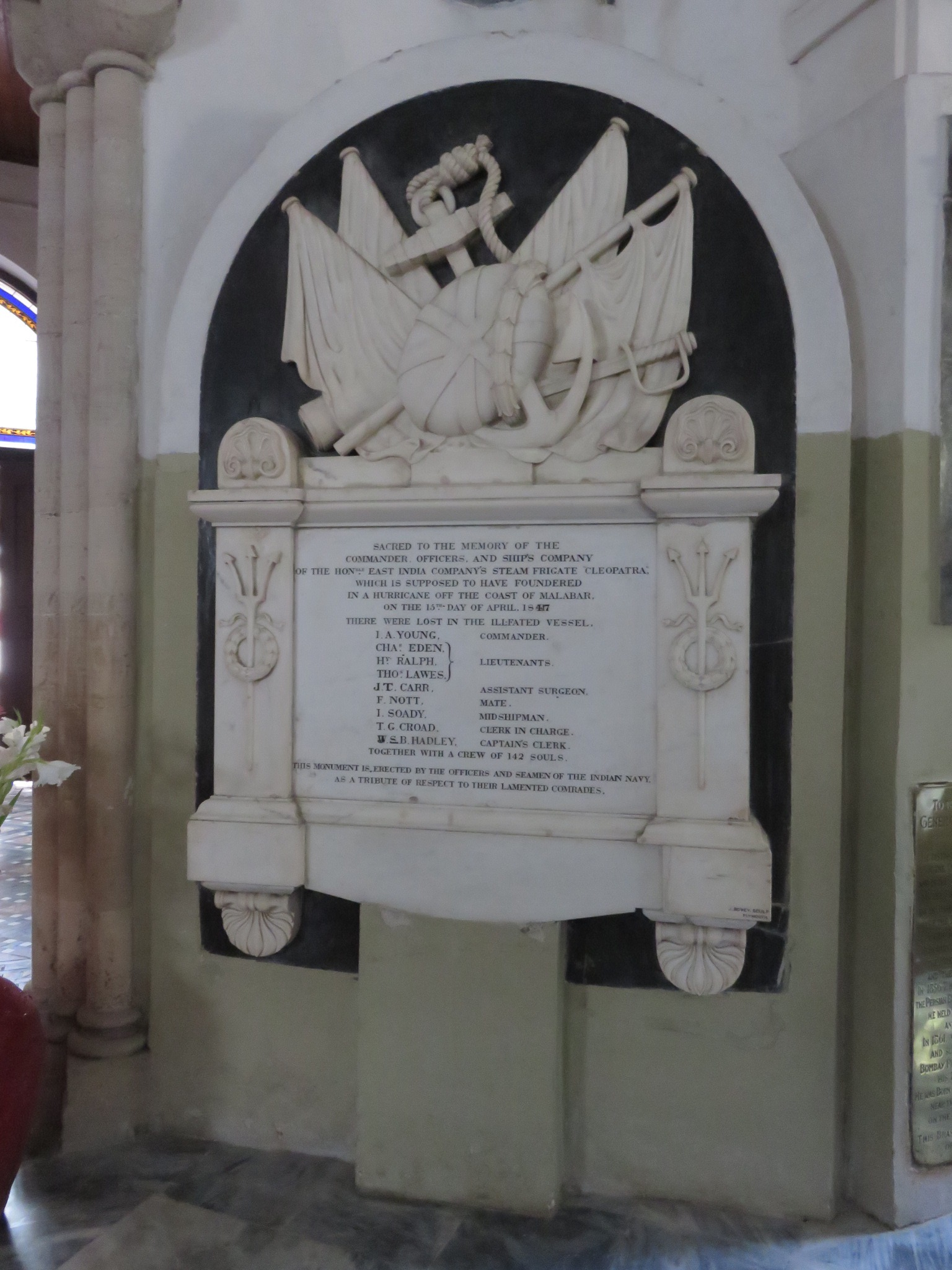
Cleopatra Memorial, St. Thomas Cathedral, Mumbai

Cleopatra was a Victorian-era wooden paddle steam frigate of the East India Company. Constructed at Northfleet, the ship arrived at Bombay (now Mumbai) on 19 April 1840, and operated as a transport and mail steamer between Bombay to Karachi, Aden and Suez.

== Loss at sea during cyclone ==
Cleopatra foundered on 15 April 1847 during a cyclone off the Malabar Coast in the Indian Ocean whilst en route from Bombay to Singapore. Nearly 300 people were killed - her entire crew of 151, 100 convicts she was carrying and their Royal Marine guard. The ship was in poor condition prior to her loss, her captain Commander J. A. Young having complained that on the immediately prior voyage, from Aden to Bombay, the paddle boxes had to be secured with chains running across the deck.

== Memorial ==
A monument recording the loss of the Cleopatra is situated close to the entrance of St. Thomas Cathedral, Mumbai.

Among the list of casualties it records the name of Assistant Surgeon James Thomas Carr, MRCS, (29 September 1822 – 15 April 1847) son of the then serving inaugural Bishop of Bombay, Rt. Revd. Thomas Carr.
