= Charles Barnett-Clarke =

Anglican reverend and Dean of Cape Town (1830–1916)

Charles William Barnett-Clarke
- Born: 16 July 1830
- Died: 23 February 1916 (aged 85)
- Occupation: Dean

Charles William Barnett-Clarke (16 July 1830 – 23 February 1916) was a long serving Dean of Cape Town, South Africa.

Clarke was baptised 8 October 1830 at St Chad's Church, Shrewsbury, Shropshire, the son of Charles Thomas Hughes Clarke and his wife, Maria Barnett. He was educated at Worcester College, Oxford and ordained in 1855. After a curacy at St Andrew, Wells Street he was Perpetual curate of Toot Baldon, Oxfordshire and then Rector of Cadmore before his South African appointment. He died in Cape Town, aged 85.

== Notes ==
Anglican Church of Southern Africa titles
Preceded by Henry Alexander Douglas	Dean of Cape Town; 1869–1916	Succeeded by Cecil Henry Rolt
