= Ranvir Shah =

Indian social activist

- Born: Mumbai, India
- Education: The Cathedral & John Cannon School; Ramakrishna Mission Vivekananda College; University of Madras
- Spouse: Nandi
- Children: 3
- Website: www.ranvirshah.com

Ranvir Shah is an Indian social activist, cultural catalyst, actor, and businessman. He is the Managing Director of P.S. Apparels, India & India Agro Exports and the Founder Trustee of Prakriti Foundation based in Chennai, South India.

== Stage ==
He is the founder of Prakriti Foundation. Through the foundation, Shah has organized and directed cultural festivals like the annual Parks New Festival, The Festival of Sacred Music at Thiruvaiyaru, The 2010 Poetry with Prakriti Festival, The Hindu Best Fiction Awards, Lit For Life, which celebrate music, literature, dance, theater and visual arts. He has worked with playwrights and performing artist's like, Chandralekha, Shankar Tucker, Manjula Padmanabhan, Maya Krishna Rao, Akram Khan, Aruna Sairam, Dominique Vellard etc. He is the Managing Director of P.S. Apparels, India & India Agro Exports. Ranvir Shah has over two decades of experience in the domestic and international markets in garment exports through P.S. Apparels, India one of India's leading manufacturers of finished woven garments started in 1979 based in Chennai, India. He straddles the seemingly unconnected worlds of art and industry and attempts to create symbiotic links between the two, as a firm believer in the proactive role industry can play in non-commercial ventures and the importance of art in the human endeavour.

== Early life and education ==
Born in Mumbai, Ranvir Shah was schooled in different parts of the world; namely Mumbai, Kolkata, Ahmedabad and the US. After finishing his schooling at Cathedral and John Connon School Mumbai (ICSE ’77), he did his plus two at Hassaram Rijhumal (HR) College. He holds a bachelor's degree in Commerce from Vivekananda Evening College, Chennai. Hailing from a Jain business family, Shah came to the then Madras from Bombay as a young boy in 1980 when his family started a garment business. He worked during the day at his father's factory and attended evening classes at the Vivekananda College. His great interest in books, art, music, interior decoration and a very sharp and keen aesthetic perception began to get noticed even when he was in college and he directed A.K.Ramanujan's translation of Sangam poetry as a dramatic event with Nirupama Nityanandan and Dipankar Mukherjee making their debut theatre appearances. In 1984, Shah directed his first directorial venture at Chandralekha's theatre spaces of A. K. Ramanujan's play The Interior Landscape. He has also appeared in Tamil Films like Minsara Kanavu.

== Contribution to Society ==
=== Prakriti Foundation ===
Ranvir Shah is the founder of Prakriti Foundation. Prakriti Foundation was founded in Chennai in 1998 to host events inquiring into the cultural heritage and inheritance of India. The vision behind Prakriti is to host events that would play a catalytic role in changing and enlarging the cultural scene in Chennai. Thus, Prakriti Foundation saw itself typically as the moving force behind events as diverse as music concerts, seminars and serious scholarly discourse, multimedia events, experimental and protest cinema and theatre festivals. In the last 20 years, Prakriti Foundation has worked to explore identity through history and heritage, art and cultural expression. Prakriti has been the space where scholars, researchers, artists, critics, poets and filmmakers have been able to present their work to those who engage with it on serious terms. Prakriti's lecture demonstrations, poetry readings, film screenings and intimate performances continue to dot the Chennai calendar. The main areas that the Foundation is involved in, are theatre, music, dance, literature, heritage and Indology. Through the foundation, Shah has organized and directed cultural festivals like the annual Hamara Shakespeare Festival, Gharana Festival of Indian Music, Tree of Life Film Festival One Billion Eyes, Parks New Festival, The Festival of Sacred Music at Thiruvaiyaru, and the Poetry with Prakriti Festival. He has worked with playwrights and performing artists like, Chandralekha, Shankar Tucker, Manjula Padmanabhan, Maya Krishna Rao, Akram Khan, Aruna Sairam, Dominique Vellard etc. Prakriti Foundation runs 4 annual festivals, pan-India. Prakriti Foundation undertook the restoration of the Muchukunda Murals, in 2012. A book was about these murals by Prof David Shulman was also published by Prakriti Foundation.

=== Rambhaba Charitable Trust ===
Ranvir Shah is the trustee of Rambhaba Charitable Trust. Started in 1991, the Rambhaba Trust was begun to provide scholarships to cover school fees and medical expenses. This was provided to the children of PS Group's employees and others. Till date. approximately 140 scholarships have been provided through the trust. The trust also subsidizes medical expenses through donations.

=== Ashraya Trust ===
Shah is a Trustee of Ashraya, a non-government organization that creates awareness and helps prevent child sexual abuse. Ashraya was born out of a deep concern for children of any group who are being sexually abused, as well as adult survivors who are grappling with past trauma. To further this mission, Ashraya conducts regular workshops at schools, colleges and corporates with an intergenerational group of students, teachers and parents. Through Ashraya, a network of counselors are available for survivors who may want to resolve the issue of child sexual abuse. To date, Ashraya has conducted approximately 100 workshops all over the city, in the municipality and private schools. It also works with the Police Training School sensitizing the new sub-inspectors on the topic of child abuse.

== Citizens run trust ==
Ranvir Shah is the main trustee of the Citizen's Run Trust. For the past 16 years, it has seen the events grow in stature, in its capacity to spread awareness and impact lives positively. The Citizens Run Trust was launched to extend financial support to deserving NGOs who undertake the welfare of various destitute, socially, economically as well as physically and intellectually disabled and disadvantaged children and the aged men and women. In order to mobilize funds for this social cause, the Citizens Run Trust has been organizing a cross-city run every year since 1996 in which people from different milieux in Chennai participate. This is to create awareness among the citizens about these NGOs.
