= William Newman (priest) =

William Newman (1811–1864) was the inaugural Dean of Cape Town.

== Notes ==
Anglican Church of Southern Africa titles
New title	Dean of Cape Town; 1852–1866	Succeeded by Henry Alexander Douglas
