= John Wither Awdry =

Indian judge (1795–1878)

Sir John Wither Awdry DL (21 October 1795 – 31 May 1878) was an English judge who worked in British India.

== Early life ==
Born at Swindon, he was the second and oldest surviving son of John Awdry and his wife Jane, the second daughter of Lovelace Bigg. Awdry was educated at Westminster School and then at Christ Church, Oxford. He was first in classics in 1816 and graduated with a Master of Arts ten years later. In 1844, Awdry received a Doctorate of Civil Law by the University of Oxford.

== Career ==
Awdry was called to the bar by the Middle Temple in 1822 and became a bencher in 1830, on whose occasion he was created a Knight Bachelor. He was puisne judge and commissioner of the Insolvent Debtor's Court in Bombay. In 1839, he was appointed chief justice of the Supreme Court of Judicature at Bombay, resigning from this post after three years. After his return to England, Awdry served as chairman of the Quarter Sessions in Wiltshire and represented the county as Deputy Lieutenant from 1852.

== Personal life ==
On 29 June 1830, he married firstly Sarah Maria, eldest daughter of Jeremiah Awdry, and had by her two sons and a daughter. After her death, he married secondly on 24 July 1839 Frances Ellen Carr, second daughter of Thomas Carr. By his second wife, he had eight sons and four daughters. Awdry died at his home at Notton House. Lady Awdrey died at Notton, Wiltshire on 10 April 1900, in her 80th year. His sons included William Awdry, an Anglican bishop, and Charles Awdry, senior partner of W. H. Smith. He was the paternal grandfather of the writer and clergyman Wilbert Awdry.

== Arms ==
Coat of arms of John Wither Awdry
Crest On a wreath of the colours in front of a lion's head erased Azure gorged with a collar gemel Argent a cinquefoil between two crescents fesseways Or. Escutcheon Argent on a bend Azure cottised Sable between two crescents of the second a crescent between two cinquefoils Or. Motto Nil Sine Deo
