= Stephanie Flanders =

British economist and journalist (born 1968)

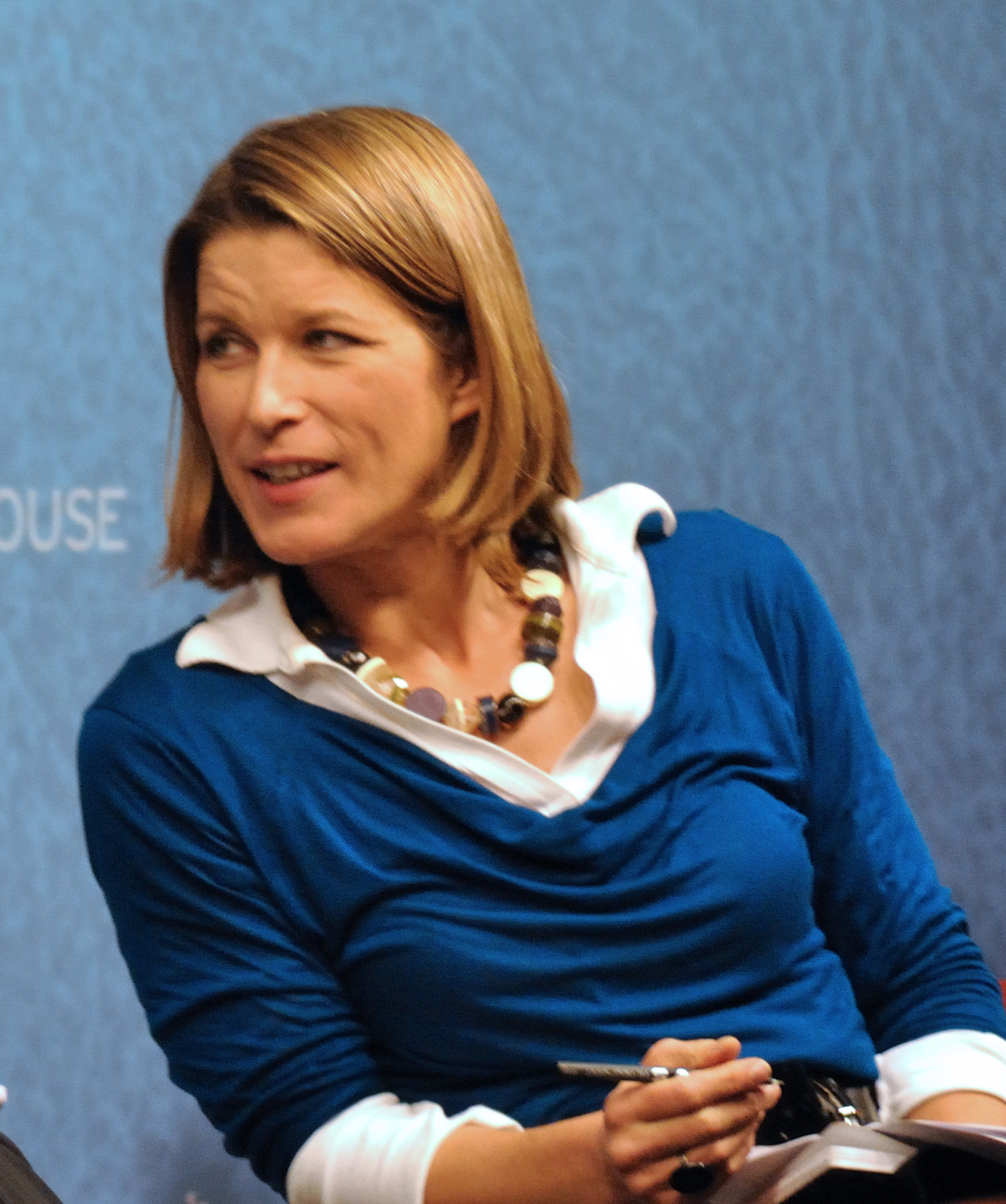
- Flanders in 2011
- Born: Stephanie Hope Flanders; 5 August 1968 (age 58)
- Education: St Paul's Girls' School; Balliol College, Oxford (BA); Harvard University (MPA)
- Occupations: Market strategist; journalist; editor; presenter
- Title: (formerly) Economics Editor: BBC (2008–2013)
- Spouse: John Arlidge
- Children: 2
- Parent(s): Michael Flanders; Claudia Cockburn

Stephanie Hope Flanders (born 5 August 1968) is a British economist and journalist, currently the head of Economics and Politics at Bloomberg News. She was previously chief market strategist for Britain and Europe for J.P. Morgan Asset Management, and before that was the BBC News economics editor for five years. Flanders is the daughter of British actor and comic singer Michael Flanders and disability campaigner Claudia Cockburn.

== Early life ==
Flanders was born on 5 August 1968. Her father, Michael Flanders, died in 1975 when she was six years old. She attended St Paul's Girls' School and Balliol College, Oxford, where she obtained a first class degree in Philosophy, Politics and Economics. She then attended the John F. Kennedy School of Government at Harvard University as a Kennedy Scholar, receiving a Master of Public Administration.

== Career ==
=== Early work ===
Flanders began her career as an economist at the London Business School and the Institute for Fiscal Studies. She then became a leader writer and columnist at the Financial Times from 1994. She became a speechwriter and advisor to U.S. Treasury Secretary Lawrence H. Summers in 1997, and joined The New York Times in 2001.

=== Newsnight ===
Flanders joined the BBC's Newsnight in 2002. A keen cyclist, in 2005 she presented a review of Britain's economic status for Panorama from her bicycle, travelling the length of the country. She also contributed (with reference to her father's song "A Transport Of Delight") to the BBC News coverage of the last of the AEC Routemaster buses. In 2006 and 2007, she presented some relief shifts for BBC News between 2 pm and 5 pm. She has anchored editions of Newsnight with an economic focus.

On a Newsnight programme in August 2007, Flanders interviewed Conservative Party leader David Cameron about his proposed policy of tax breaks for married couples while questioning him with other journalists, asking him whether he had ever met anyone who would get married for an extra £20 per week. As an unmarried mother, she also asked Cameron whether the Conservative Party would like her to be married.

=== BBC economics editor ===
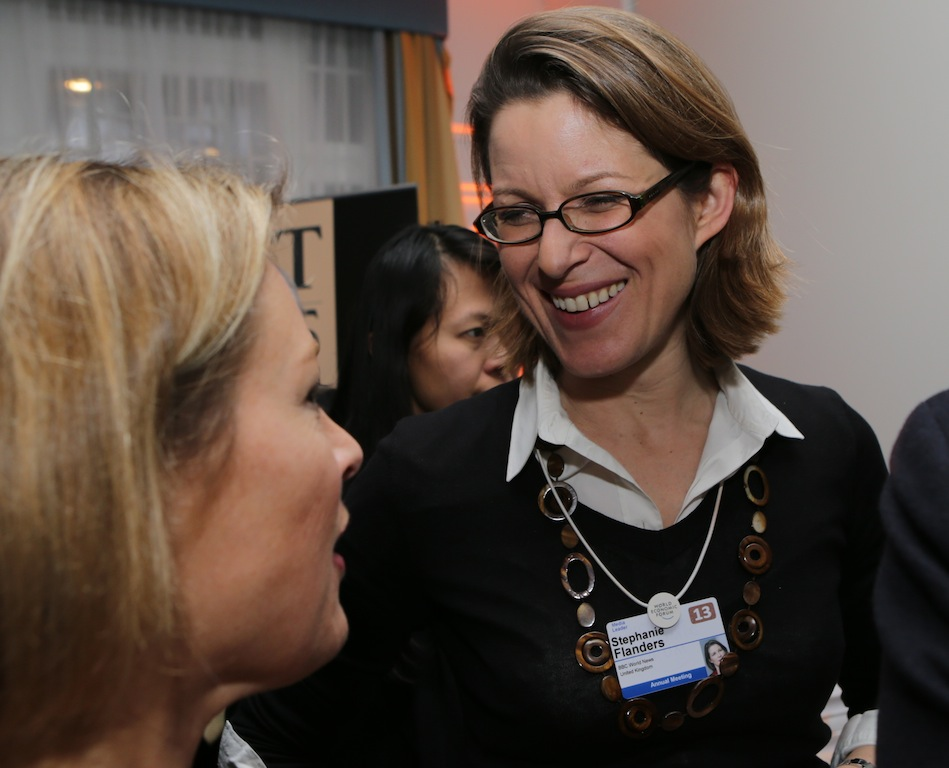
Flanders (right) in January 2013

In February 2008, it was announced that she would replace Evan Davis as BBC economics editor, since he was moving to present Radio 4's Today programme. She took up this position on 17 March, although from June of that year until January 2009, deputy economics editor Hugh Pym temporarily replaced her as the main economics editor whilst she was on maternity leave.

She presented a programme called "Stephanomics" on BBC Radio Four during July 2012. This programme asked questions about the world's economy, such as whether China or the United States would be the more important economic power. Another series of this programme began to be broadcast on Radio Four in April 2013. In 2012, Flanders presented Masters of Money, a BBC Two documentary series exploring the lives of Karl Marx, John Maynard Keynes, and Friedrich Hayek. In August 2012, Secretary of State for Work and Pensions Iain Duncan Smith made a formal complaint to the BBC claiming that there was a pro-Labour bias in her coverage of unemployment figures. The BBC stated in response that they were satisfied that their coverage was impartial.

Aside from her work as economic editor, Flanders presented The Andrew Marr Show during August 2009 to cover for Andrew Marr, and was an occasional relief presenter of Newsnight until she left the BBC. In 2009, Flanders played herself in a BBC Radio production of the Julian Gough short story The Great Hargeisa Goat Bubble. Set in Somaliland in the 1980s, the story is an allegorical analysis of certain aspects of modern economics, such as automatic trading, and complex financial derivatives.

On 26 September 2013, it was announced that Flanders would leave the BBC to join J.P. Morgan Asset Management where she would be chief market strategist for Europe and the UK. Referring to her departure from the BBC, Guardian columnist Peter Preston wrote: "She wasn't a simple reporter, talking to people and reading the runes: she was an intellectual player in a vital, but often arcane, area." She was replaced as economics editor by the BBC's business editor, Robert Peston. She still occasionally appears as an expert and presents programmes for the BBC.

In September 2017, Flanders co-presented two editions of BBC Radio 4's Today programme with Justin Webb. She subsequently joined Bloomberg News as Senior Executive Editor for Economics and head of Bloomberg Economics.

=== Academia ===
Since 2008, Flanders has been a visiting fellow of Nuffield College, Oxford. On 28 February 2013, she presented the 2013 Bob Friend Memorial Lecture at the Pilkington Lecture Theatre at the University of Kent's Medway Campus in Chatham. The University of Kent’s Centre for Journalism has had since 2009, the Sky News Bob Friend Memorial Scholarship.

== Personal life ==
Flanders and her husband John Arlidge, a journalist, have a son and a daughter.

In June 2007, Flanders presented an edition of BBC Radio 4's Archive Hour about her father's career, titled Flanders on Flanders.

Media offices
Preceded by Evan Davis	Economics Editor: BBC News; 2008–2013	Succeeded by Robert Peston
Preceded by Evan Davis	Economics Editor: BBC Newsnight; 2002–2008	Succeeded by Paul Mason
