= Sterling Cineplex =

Multiplex cinema hall in Mumbai, India

- Sterling Cinema, Sterling Theatre
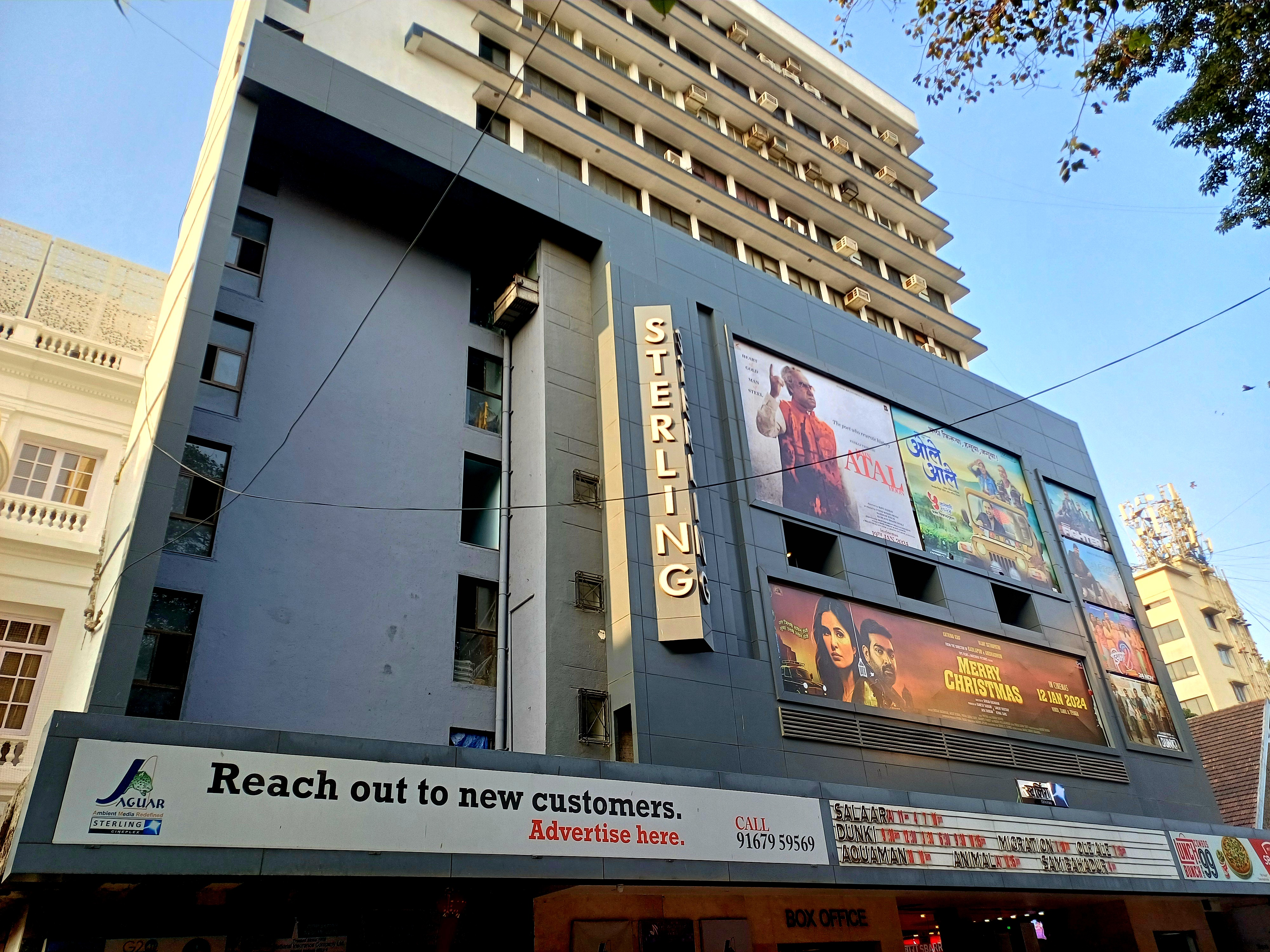
- Sterling Cineplex in 2024
- Interactive map of Sterling Cineplex
- Address: 65, Cinema Lane, Marzaban Road, Fort; Mumbai; India
- Coordinates: 18.938°N 72.833°E
- Type: Multiplex

Construction
- Opened: 1969
- Reopened: 2007
- Years active: 1969–present

Website
- http://www.sterlingcineplex.in/

Sterling Cineplex (previously known as Sterling Cinema) is a multiplex cinema hall in Mumbai. Opened (as a multiplex) in 2007, Sterling has three screens and was the first cinema in India to be THX certified. It is considered a landmark in South Mumbai.

== History ==
Sterling Cinema (also referred to as Sterling Theatre) was opened in 1969 with Doctor Dolittle, a Hollywood musical. Sterling was a frontrunner in terms of technology, being the first cinema in India to introduce Dolby sound and Xenon projectors. In terms of snacks and shows too, Sterling was the first cinema in India to introduce [Caramel Popcorn], matinee shows as well as late night shows. In fact, at one time Sterling was the only cinema in South Mumbai to have a late night show. Its matinee shows were popular among students of nearby colleges. As a single screen cinema, Sterling used to screen only Hollywood films. Ajay Bijli, the owner of PVR Cinemas (then Priya Cinema in New Delhi) visited Sterling Cinema in 1990, which was then the only cinema in India with Dolby sound and was so impressed by it that he convinced his father to remodel Priya Cinema along the lines of Sterling, with Dolby sound and screening Hollywood movies. In 1999, Sterling was looted by robbers armed with knives. The robbers beat up cinema staff and locked them in toilets before escaping with cash and valuables.

== Conversion to multiplex ==
With the advent of new age multiplexes in Mumbai, Sterling, which catered to a niche English-speaking youth crowd, faced competition apart from the fact that single screen cinemas were heavily taxed whereas new multiplexes had tax incentives. It was first reported in 2003, that Sterling along with other single screen cinemas in Mumbai was looking at conversion into a multiplex. In May 2006 it was confirmed that Sterling would close down for a year to make way for a multiplex under the same management. It reopened in May 2007 as Sterling Cineplex for audiences of both Hollywood and Bollywood with films Spider-Man 3 and Yatra. The renewed theatre had three screens, a food court, THX certification and online booking facilities. When reopened, the Sterling management confirmed that it would screen both Hollywood and Bollywood movies, though priority would be given to Hollywood films. In 2009, it was reported that prior to the 2008 Mumbai attacks, trained Lashkar-e-Taiba militants had surveyed various other places in Mumbai, including Sterling Cinema.
