= William Awdry =

British bishop (1842–1910)

The Rt Revd William Awdry
- Missionary, Bishop of Southampton, Osaka and South Tokyo
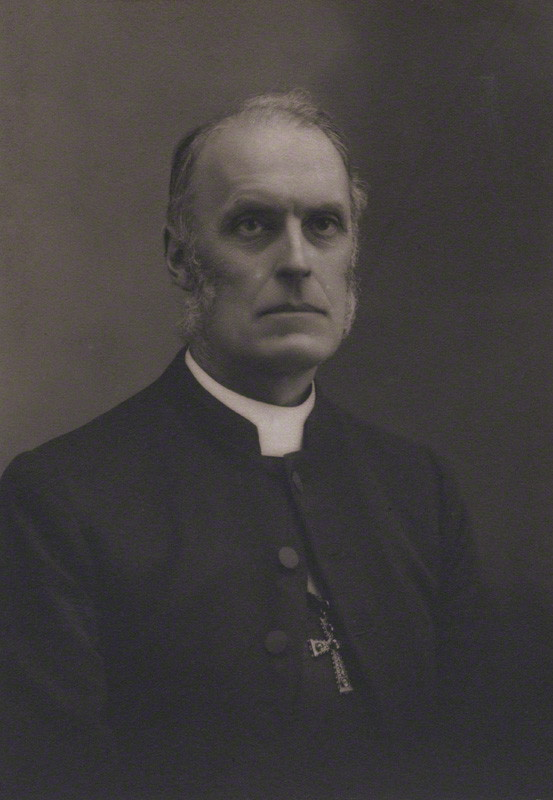
- Awdry in 1900
- Province: Church of England

Personal details
- Born: 24 January 1842 Wiltshire, England
- Died: 4 January 1910 (aged 67)
- Parents: John Awdry
- Spouse: Frances Emily Moberly (m. 1868)
- Education: Balliol College, Oxford

William Awdry (24 January 1842 – 4 January 1910) was the inaugural Bishop of Southampton and Osaka who subsequently served South Tokyo.

He was the fourth son of Sir John Wither Awdry and his second wife Frances Ellen Carr, second daughter of Thomas Carr. Awdry was educated at Winchester College and Balliol College, Oxford. While at Oxford, he rowed in the Oxford eight in the Boat Race in 1863 and 1864 and his crew won both times.

Ordained in 1865, his early career was an academic one. He obtained a first-class in Literae Humaniores in 1865; and he was successively fellow and lecturer at The Queen's College, Oxford, 1866–1868, second master at his old school and finally headmaster of Hurstpierpoint, 1873–1879. In 1879 he became a canon residentiary at Chichester Cathedral and principal of the nearby Theological College. After seven years he was appointed vicar of Amport, his final post before ascending to the episcopate.

Awdry was consecrated Bishop Suffragan of Southampton by Archbishop Benson at St. Paul's Cathedral on June 29, 1895. Awdry was appointed Bishop of Osaka in 1896 and was then installed as the Bishop of South Tokyo in 1897, after the death of Bishop Edward Bickersteth.

As the Bishop of South Tokyo, Awdry led the diocese during a period of growth, improved Anglo-Japanese diplomatic relations, as well as rapid social and political change. The Nippon Sei Ko Kai, benefited from greater protections enshrined in the Meiji Constitution of 1899, but a new era of Japanese nationalist politics and an expansionist foreign policy also tested the leadership of the young church. As Bishop, Awdry was also instrumental in founding the Central Theological College, Tokyo.

== Family ==
In 1868, Awdry married Frances Emily, daughter of the Rt Rev. George Moberly, Bishop of Salisbury. There were no children from the marriage.

A nephew, Rev. W. Awdry was the creator of Thomas the Tank Engine and author of the acclaimed children's Railway Series.

== See also ==
- List of Oxford University Boat Race crews
- Anglican Church in Japan

Church of England titles
Preceded by Inaugural appointment	Bishop of Southampton; 1895–1896	Succeeded by George Carnac Fisher
Preceded by Inaugural appointment	Bishop of Osaka; 1896 –1898	Succeeded by Hugh James Foss
Preceded by Edward Bickersteth	Bishop of South Tokyo; 1898–1908	Succeeded by Cecil Henry Boutflower
