= Kuruvilla =

Kuruvila or Kuruvilla is a given masculine name (and also as a surname/lastname where the complete name format is 'X' son of 'Y', and a traditional surname is not used), among the Syriac Christian community of Kerala. The Western equivalent is Cyril (also Cyrillus or Cyryl), also used as a masculine given name. It is derived from the Greek name Κύριλλος (Kýrillos) meaning "lordly, masterful", which in turn derives from Greek κυριος (kýrios) "lord". Kuruvila essentially means "the one belonging to the lord."

Notable people with the name include:

- Abey Kuruvilla (born 1968), Indian cricketer
- Anish Kuruvilla, Indian film director and actor
- Elenjikal Chandy Kuruvila (1922–1994), Indian Navy admiral
- Kuruvilla Pandikattu (born 1957), Indian philosopher and priest
