= Walter Pym (bishop) =

English colonial bishop (1856–1908)

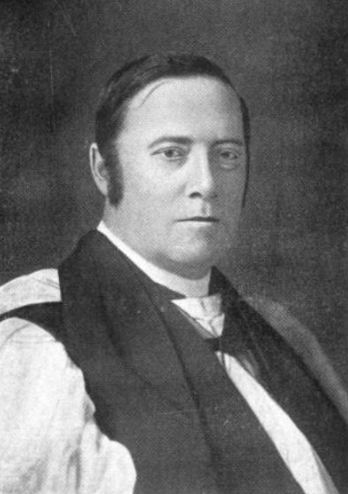
- Born: 22 June 1856; Great Chesterford, England
- Died: 2 March 1908 (aged 51); Dilkoosh, British India
- Education: Bedford School; Magdalene College, Cambridge
- Occupation: Clergyman
- Spouse: Lucy Anne Threlfall (m. 1883)
- Children: Leslie Pym; Lucy Barbara Pym; Thomas Wentworth Pym

Walter Ruthven Pym (22 June 1856 – 2 March 1908) was an English colonial bishop at the end of the 19th and the beginning of the 20th century.

== Biography ==
Walter Pym was born in Great Chesterford in 1856. The son of Alexander Pym and Eliza Elizabeth Pell, he was educated at Bedford School and Magdalene College, Cambridge. Ordained in 1881, after a curacy in Lytham he was successively Vicar of Miles Platting, Wentworth and Sharrow before being appointed Rural Dean of Rotherham. In 1898 he was appointed Bishop of Mauritius, and then was translated in 1903 to Bombay. Although he had had a reputation as a "vigorous and moderate evangelistic style," his attempts to suppress more Catholic expressions of piety led to controversy and dissent.

He married Lucy Anne Threlfall, daughter of Thomas Threlfall, on 8 August 1883. Their daughter Lucy Barbara Pym MBE (1895–1979) married Sir Edward Ruggles-Brise, 1st Baronet. Their eldest son, Leslie Ruthven Pym (1884–1945), was Conservative MP for Monmouth from 1939–1945, and his son, Francis Pym (1922–2008) was a Conservative MP from 1961–1987 and a cabinet minister. Their second son, Revd Canon Thomas Wentworth Pym DSO (1885–1945), was Fellow in Theology at Balliol College, Oxford. Walter Pym died in 1908.

Church of England titles
Preceded by William Walsh	Bishop of Mauritius; 1898 – 1903	Succeeded by Francis Ambrose Gregory
Preceded by James Macarthur	Bishop of Bombay; 1903 – 1908	Succeeded by Edwin James Palmer
