= Robert Awdry =

English cricketer and councillor

Robert Awdry CBE
- Born: Robert William Awdry; 20 May 1881; Kensington, London
- Died: 3 February 1949 (aged 67); Devizes, Wiltshire
- Spouse: Olive Muriel Tosswill (m. 1913)
- Children: 1
- Relatives: Charles Awdry (nephew)
- Military career
- Allegiance: United Kingdom
- Branch: British Army
- Rank: Lieutenant colonel
- Unit: Royal Wiltshire Yeomanry
- Conflicts: World War I
- Cricket career

Cricket information
- Batting: Right-handed

Domestic team information
- Years: Team
- 1902-1904: Oxford University Cricket Club
- Wiltshire County Cricket Club
- Source: Cricinfo, 18 March 2017

Robert William Awdry CBE (20 May 1881 – 3 February 1949) was an English cricketer who later became chairman of Wiltshire County Council. He played nine first-class matches for Oxford University Cricket Club between 1902 and 1904.

He was the third son of Charles Awdry of Shaw Hill House, Melksham, and afterwards of the Manor, Littleton Panell. His mother was Margaret Helen, daughter of Rev George Moberly, former principal of Winchester College and Bishop of Salisbury. Awdry was educated at Winchester College and New College, Oxford. He served in the Royal Wiltshire Yeomanry through World War I, and after the war rose to the rank of lieutenant colonel commanding the regiment.

He was High Sheriff of Wiltshire in 1928. He was a member of Wiltshire County Council 1919–49 and its chairman 1946–49. He was appointed CBE in the 1946 New Year Honours in recognition of his role as chairman of the council's Emergency Committee.

Awdry was captain of Wiltshire County Cricket Club for several years, and served as President and later Chairman of Wiltshire Archaeological and Natural History Society from 1939 until his death.

Awdrey married Olive Muriel Tosswill in 1913 and they had one daughter. In 1920, Olive was appointed MBE for services to Wiltshire Women's County Agricultural Committee. Awdry had Hawkswell House built at Little Cheverell, Wiltshire around 1914–1920, and lived there until 1941.

== See also ==
- List of Oxford University Cricket Club players
