= Charles Awdry =

English cricketer and British Army officer

Personal information
- Full name: Charles Edwin Awdry
- Born: 29 April 1906; Paddington, London, England
- Died: 16 November 1965 (aged 59); Bowden Hill, Wiltshire, England
- Batting: Right-handed
- Bowling: Right-arm fast-medium
- Relatives: Eustace Mordaunt (father-in-law); Robert Awdry (uncle)

Domestic team information
- Years: Team
- 1937: Minor Counties
- 1924–1939: Wiltshire

Career statistics
Competition	First-class
Matches	2
Runs scored	16
Batting average	5.33
100s/50s	–/–
Top score	8
Balls bowled	210
Wickets	3
Bowling average	26.66
5 wickets in innings	–
10 wickets in match	–
Best bowling	2/56
Catches/stumpings	1/–
- Source: Cricinfo, 2 October 2011

Major Charles Edwin Awdry TD, JP (29 April 1906 – 16 November 1965) was an English cricketer and British Army officer, as well as a Justice of the Peace. The son of Charles Selwyn Awdry and Constance Lilias, he was born in Paddington, London and educated at Winchester College.

== Cricket ==
Awdry's batting style is unknown, but it is known that he was a right-arm fast-medium bowler. In 1924, he made his debut for Wiltshire against Berkshire in the Minor Counties Championship. He played Minor counties cricket for Wiltshire from 1924 to 1939, making 93 appearances and taking nearly 300 wickets and scoring over 1,500 runs. He also played first-class cricket on two occasions. The first of these was for the West of England against the touring New Zealanders at the County Ground, Exeter in 1927. He took the wicket of Herb McGirr in this match, while in the West's only batting innings, he was dismissed for a duck by Bill Merritt. His second first-class appearance came for the Minor Counties against Oxford University in 1937. He was dismissed in the Minor Counties first-innings for 8 runs by David Macindoe, while in their second-innings he was dismissed by the same bowler for 8 runs. With the ball, he took the wickets of Eric Dixon and Alexander Singleton in the Oxford first-innings, while going wicket-less in their second. Prior to playing for the Minor Counties, he toured Egypt with Hubert Martineau's XI in 1932 and 1933.

== Military career ==
While at Winchester College, Awdry was part of the Cadets there, he later entered the Royal Wiltshire Yeomanry with the rank of 2nd lieutenant in 1928. On 8 March 1932, he was promoted from 2nd lieutenant to lieutenant, along with the Viscount Weymouth who also served in the Royal Wiltshire Yeomanry at the time. He was promoted to captain on 14 May 1938. Awdry would later serve in World War II. During the conflict, he was awarded the "Efficiency Decoration" in August 1944 for over twelve years in the Royal Wiltshire Yeomanry, which formed a part of the Territorial Army. He was promoted to major on 1 June 1945. In 1956, he exceeded the age limit at which one could be part of the Territorial Army Reserve of Officers, and was removed from the reserve on 1 December, retaining the rank of major. At some point he received the Territorial Decoration.

== Personal life ==
Awdry married Ursula Marion Mordaunt, the daughter of Eustace Mordaunt and Cicely Marion Tubb, in 1933. He was appointed High Sheriff of Wiltshire in 1954, a post which his father had previously held in 1901. Awdry also worked as a justice of the peace. He died at Bowden Hill, Wiltshire on 16 November 1965.
