= St. Thomas Cathedral, Mumbai =

St Thomas Cathedral
- Cathedral Church of St Thomas the Apostle
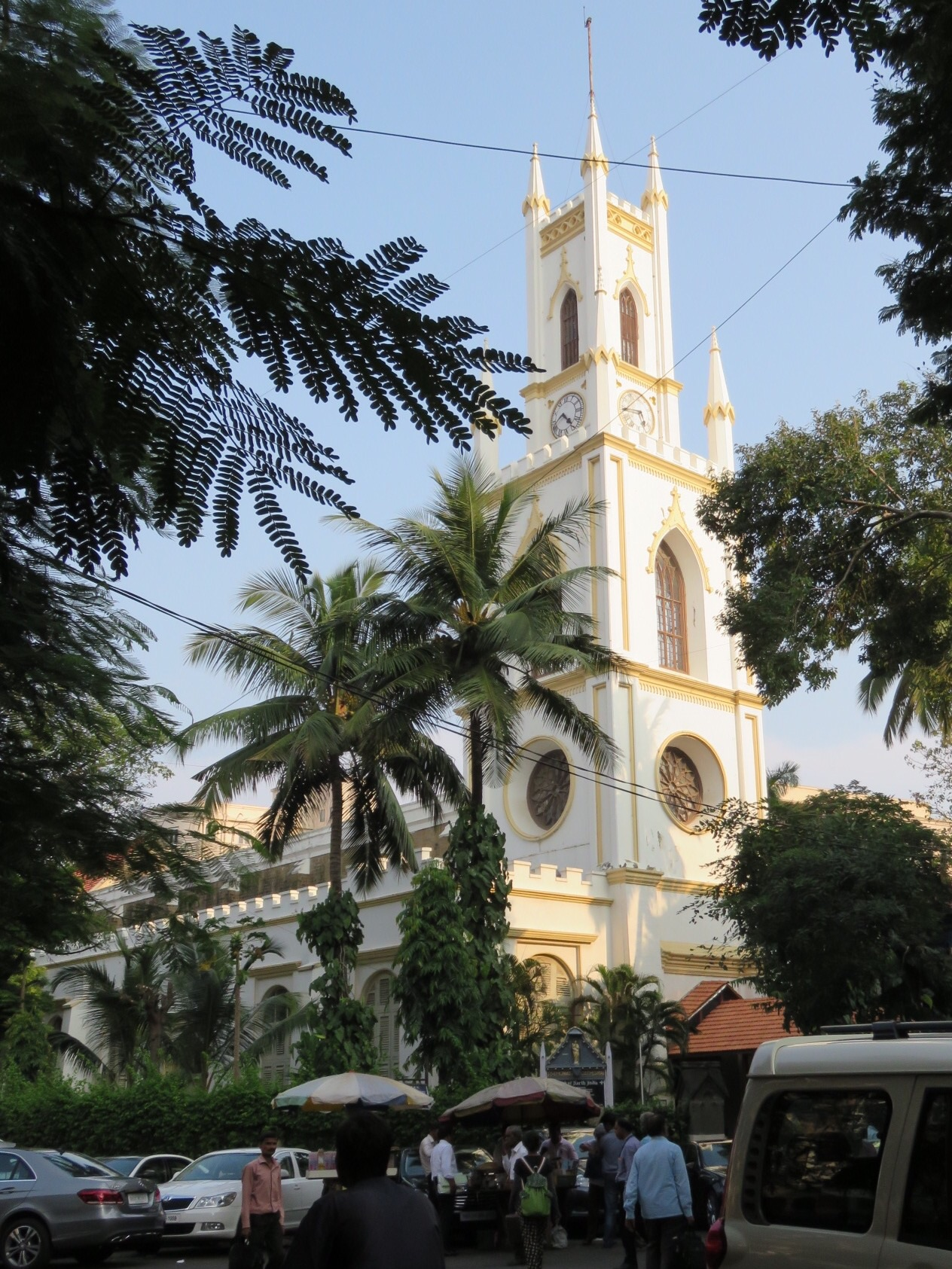
- St Thomas Cathedral
- 18°55′54″N 72°50′1″E
- Location: Horniman Circle, Fort, South Mumbai, Maharashtra
- Country: India
- Denomination: Church of North India

History
- Consecrated: 1718 (308 years ago) & 1837 (189 years ago) (renovation & expansion); Bombay, British India

Architecture
- Heritage designation: UNESCO Asia-Pacific Heritage Conservation Award
- Groundbreaking: 1676 (350 years ago)
- Completed: 1718; 308 years ago 1837 (189 years ago) (Enlarged)

Specifications
- Capacity: 1200+

St. Thomas Cathedral, Mumbai, is the 300-year old cathedral church of the Diocese of Mumbai of the Church of North India. It is named in honour of Saint Thomas the Apostle, who is believed to have first brought Christianity to India. The cathedral is located in Horniman Circle, the historic centre of Mumbai. It is in close proximity to famous Mumbai landmarks such as Flora Fountain and Bombay House. It is the oldest church in Mumbai. The Cathedral and John Connon School is run by the cathedral.

The foundation stone of the church was first laid in 1676, although the church was only finally consecrated for divine service on Christmas day 1718. It was the first Anglican church in Mumbai (then called Bombay), within the walls of the fortified British settlement. The cathedral is a landmark in South Mumbai and is one of the oldest churches in India. The Cathedral and John Connon School was created in 1860, in order to provide choristers to the church. It is used by the school for its Founder's Day Service on 14 November every year, Carol Service on the last day before the school's Christmas vacation and other special occasions.

The Churchgate railway station derives its name from the St. Thomas Cathedral, as the station was linked to the cathedral by a road leading through one of the three gates of the fortified island city of Mumbai. The walls of the Bombay Fort were demolished in 1862 and the gate leading to the church was replaced by the Flora Fountain in 1864.

== History ==
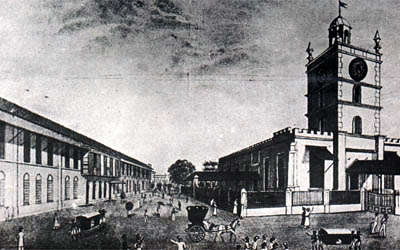
St. Thomas Church prior to 1838

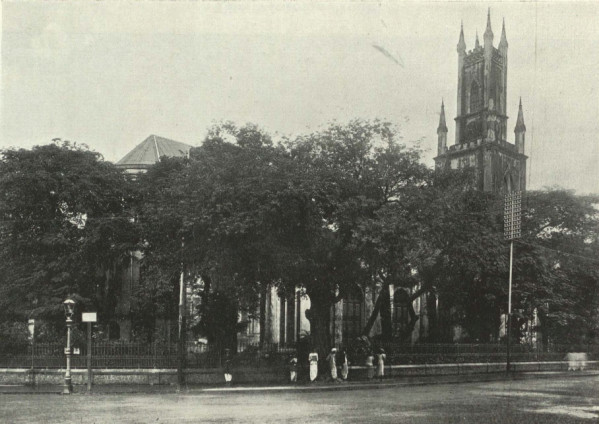
St. Thomas Cathedral, c. 1905

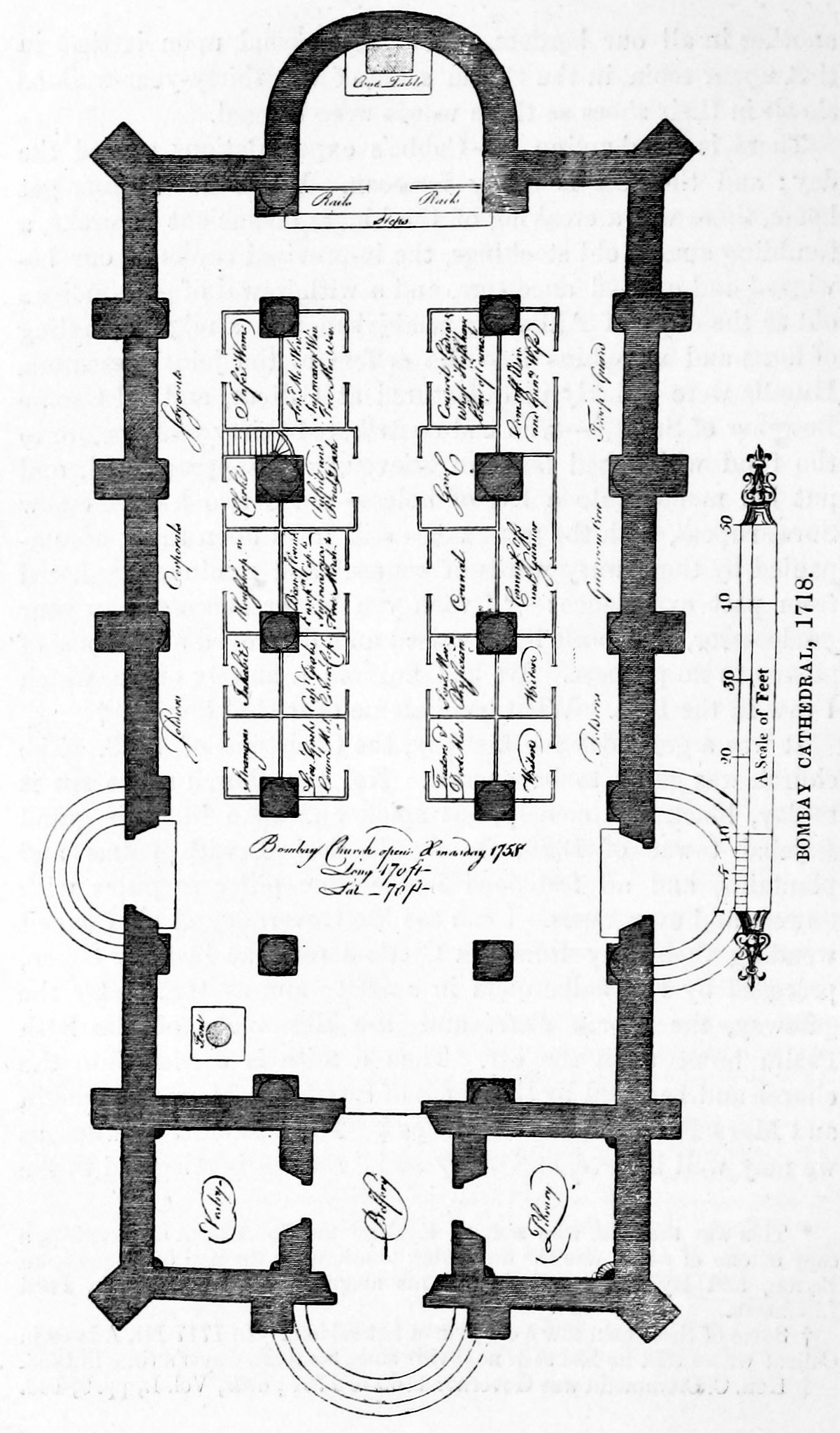
The original plan of St. Thomas Church completed in 1718

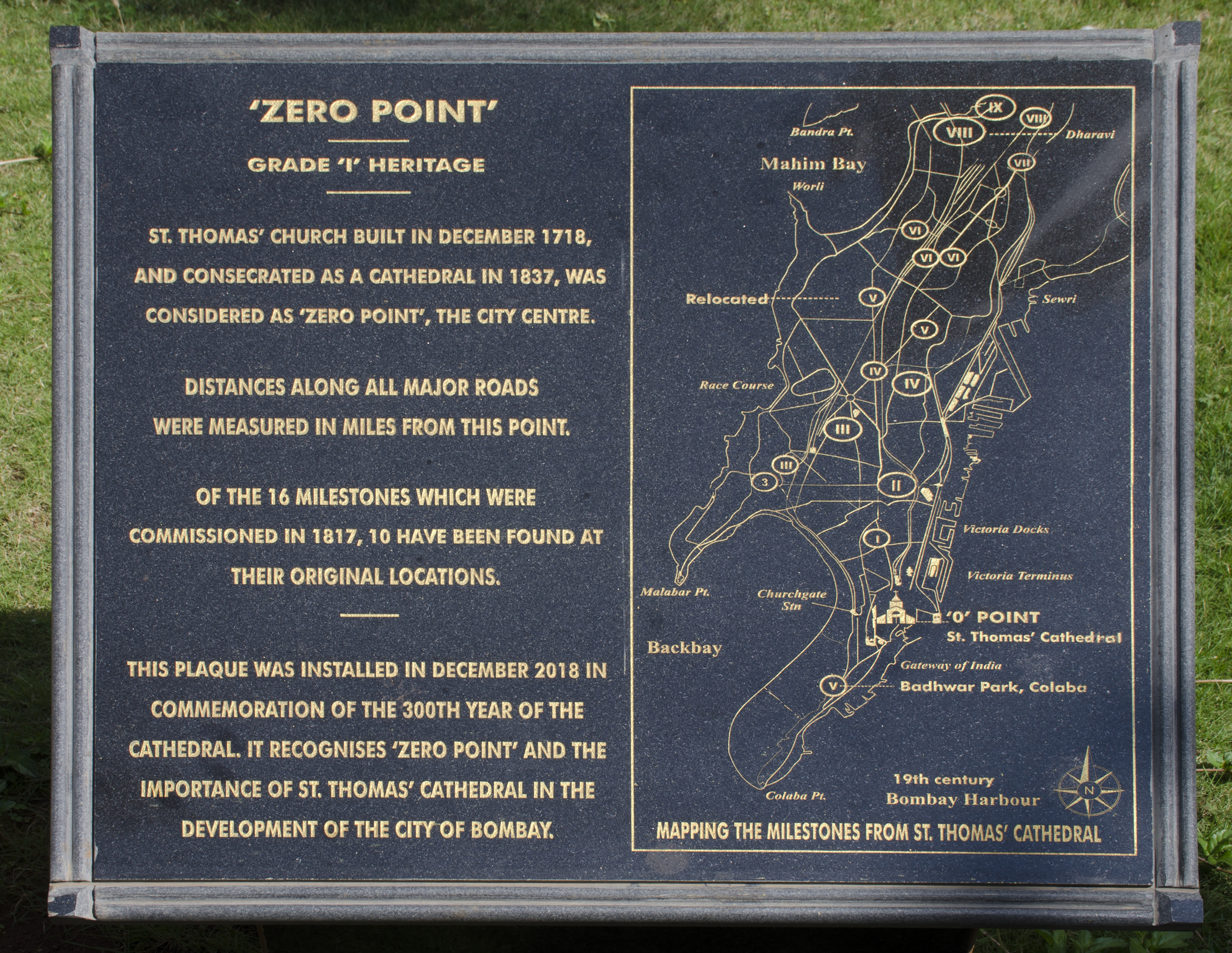
Zero Point Plaque of Mumbai at the compound of St. Thomas Cathedral, Mumbai

The name of the nearby Churchgate Station refers to this church. One of the gates in the fort, which the East India Company had built to protect their settlement, was the entrance to the St. Thomas Church. It was called Churchgate. That is why the whole area towards the west of the church is called "Churchgate" even today. The street leading to the church was originally called Churchgate Street, and was later renamed like many streets in Bombay, and is now known as Veer Nariman Road.

The island of Bombay was a Portuguese possession which became a part of the dowry of the Portuguese princess, Infanta Catherine of Braganza on her marriage to Charles II of England under the Anglo-Portuguese Marriage Treaty of June 1661. In 1668, King Charles transferred it to the East India Company for a loan of pounds Sterling 50,000 at 6% interest, and with a rental of pounds Sterling 10 per annum.

Gerald Aungier was placed in charge of the British East India Company's newly acquired factories at Surat and Bombay, which had until then belonged to Portugal. As governor of Bombay from 1672 to 1677, Angier built a church, a hospital, a court of justice and other civic amenities on the English model, and fortified the company's commercial establishment. The foundation stone for the church was laid in 1676, on Bombay Green, at the present site of the St. Thomas' Cathedral, but over 40 years elapsed before construction could be completed. Richard Cobbe, the chaplain, completed the construction of the building between 1715 and 1718. It was opened for divine service on Christmas Day 1718, and since then has served continuously as an Anglican place of worship. However, in 1816 the church was dedicated to St. Thomas, the apostle, by Thomas Middleton, the first Bishop of Kolkata.

The church was consecrated as a cathedral in July 1837 concurrent with the appointment of the first Bishop of Bombay, Thomas Carr. The tower and the clock at the western end were added in 1838. About 25 years later a major renovation scheme was launched to enlarge the chancel. This was completed by 1865.

King George V and Queen Mary attended divine service at the church in 1911 prior to their departure to the third Delhi Durbar held in the Coronation Park, Delhi. They occupied the chairs in the first row and the chairs have been preserved until now with names of the King and Queen written in brass plates.

A fountain stands at the entrance of the church. It was financed by Parsi entrepreneur and philanthropist Cowasji Jehangir Readymoney. It was designed by George Gilbert Scott and installed in the 1870s.

== Memorials ==
The cathedral contains many carved stone memorials from the eras of Company rule in India and the British Raj in India. Significant among this number:

- Memorial to Thomas Carr: Recumbent effigy of Thomas Carr, First Bishop of Bombay by British sculptor Matthew Noble
- Memorial to officers and crew of steam ship Cleopatra: Cleopatra was a steam operated wooden paddle sloop that sank of the Malabar coast on 15 April 1847. The ship was transporting 100 convicts from Bombay to Singapore. The ship had a crew of 151, including 9 officers. The plaque contains the names of te nine officers and mentions about the 142 other crew members, but there is no mention of the 100 odd convicts.
- Memorial to Frederick Lewis Maitland: Maitland died on 30 November 1839 whilst at sea on board the Wellesley, off Bombay. He was buried at Bombay.
- Memorial to Captain Hardinge: Captain George Nicholas Hardinge was the captain of San Fiorenzo, which was involved in a small three-day (6-8 March 1808) but epic naval struggle against the French ship Piedmontaise, off the cost of Colombo, Ceylon. Hardigne died of a grapeshot wound, shortly before the French surrendered. His elaborate memorial was executed by John Bacon.
- Memorial to John Campbell: John Campbell was Lieutenant-Colonel of the British army who took an active part in the Siege of Mangalore Fort and subsequent conflict with Tippoo Sultan. He died in Bombay on 23 March 1784 out of exhaustion. The marble memorial consists of life-sized figures of Death and Hope flanking an urn on a tall pedestal. It was designed by Charles Peart.

== Mumbai Zero Point ==
The cathedral marks colonial Bombay's point zero, the exact centre of the city. From the church 16 mile stones were laid out, leading to the north of the city. The milestone measured 4 feet in height but are submerged by the increasing road level. So far, 11 of the 16 milestones have been located.

== Present day ==
After completion of a major restoration work the cathedral was selected in 2004 for a UNESCO Asia-Pacific heritage conservation award.

The current congregation at St. Thomas Cathedral is led by Rev. Avinash Rangayya.

== Gallery ==
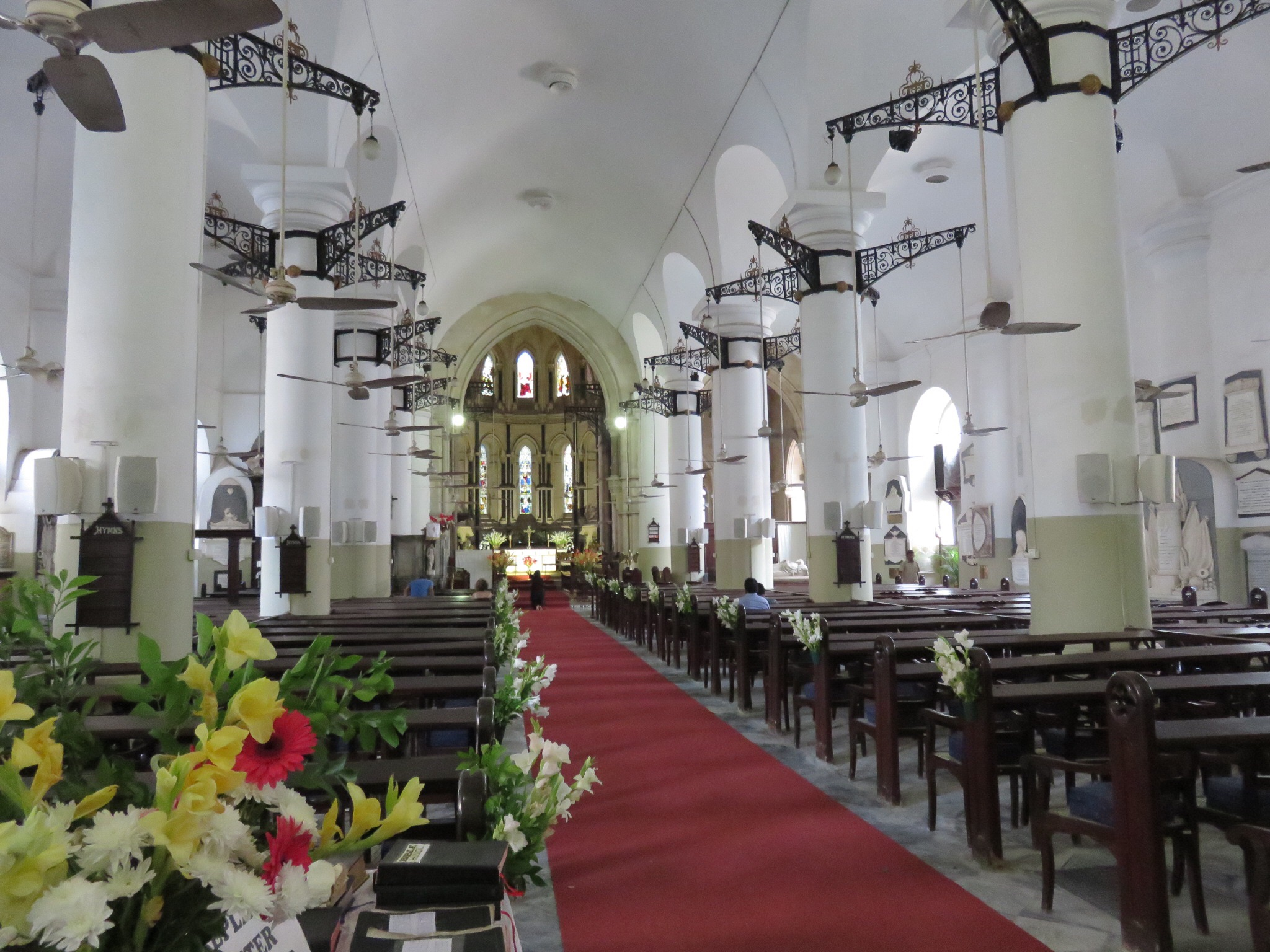
St. Thomas Cathedral, interior, nave

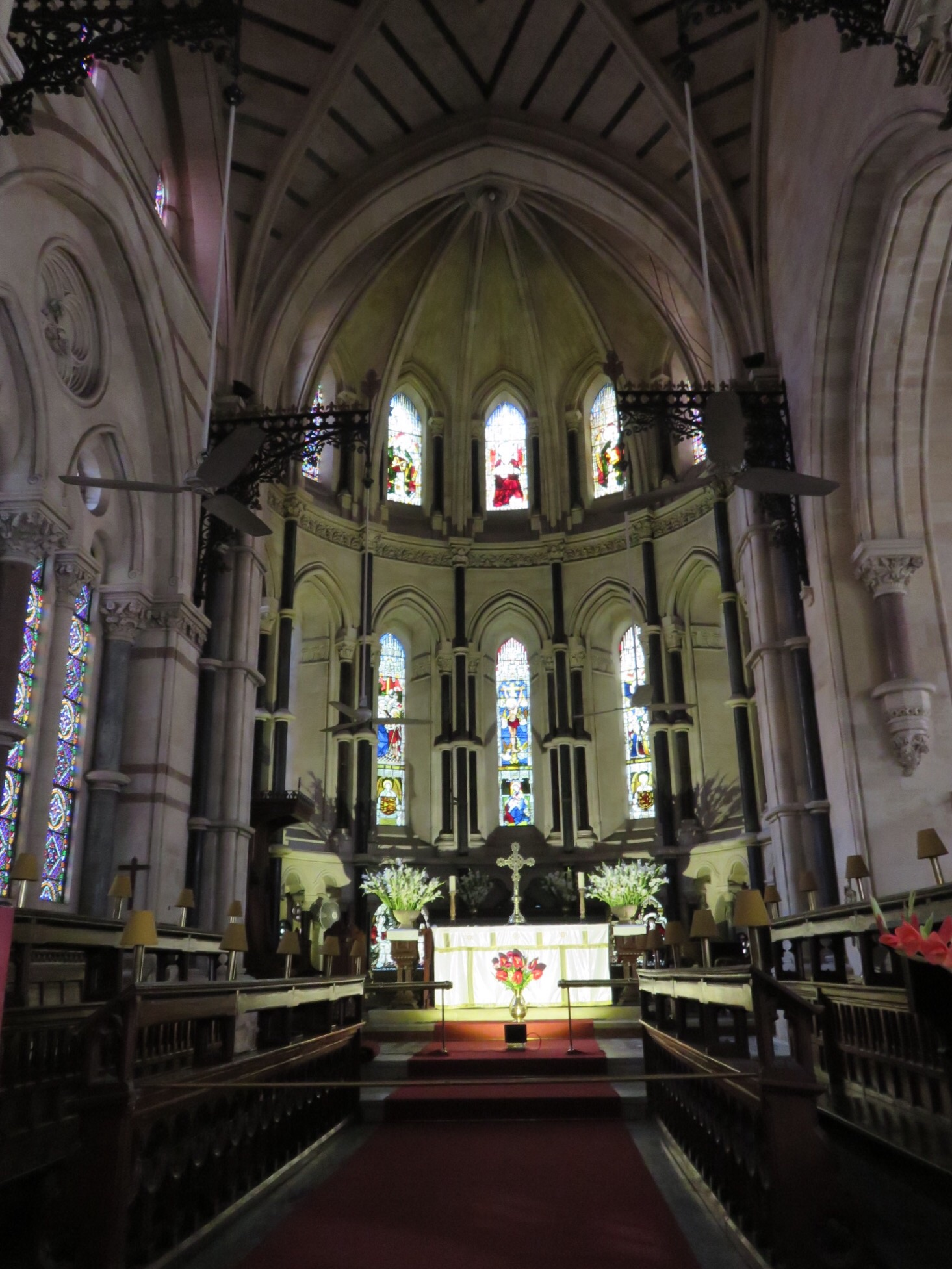
St. Thomas Cathedral, interior, chancel

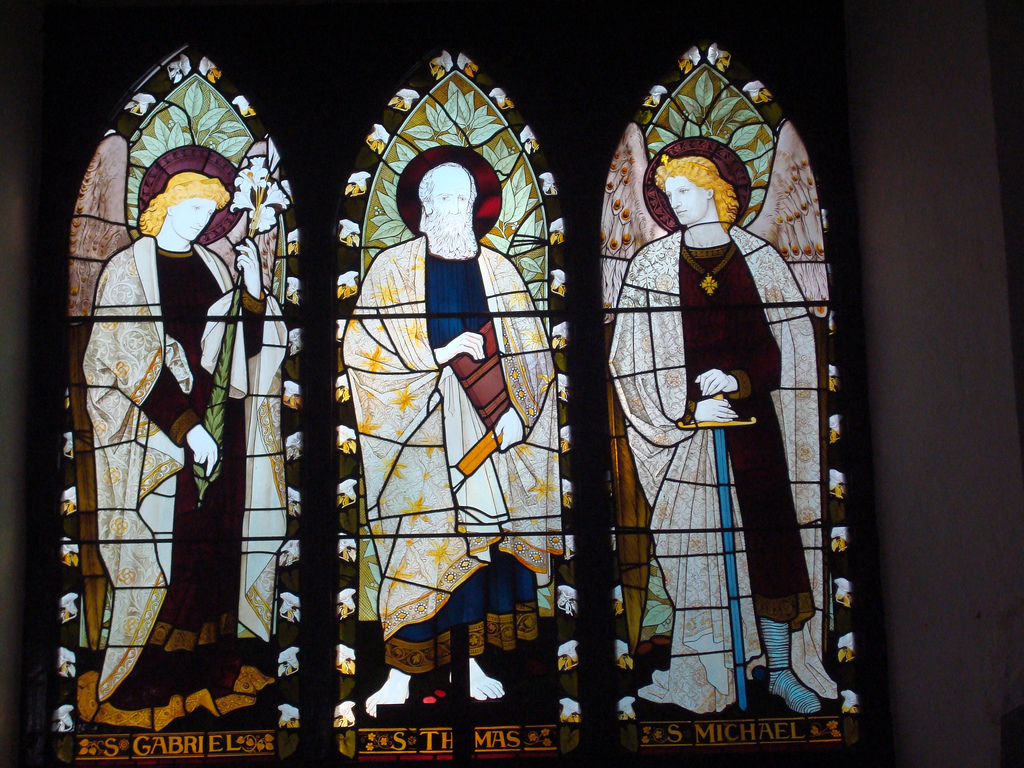
Stained glass window of St. Thomas Cathedral

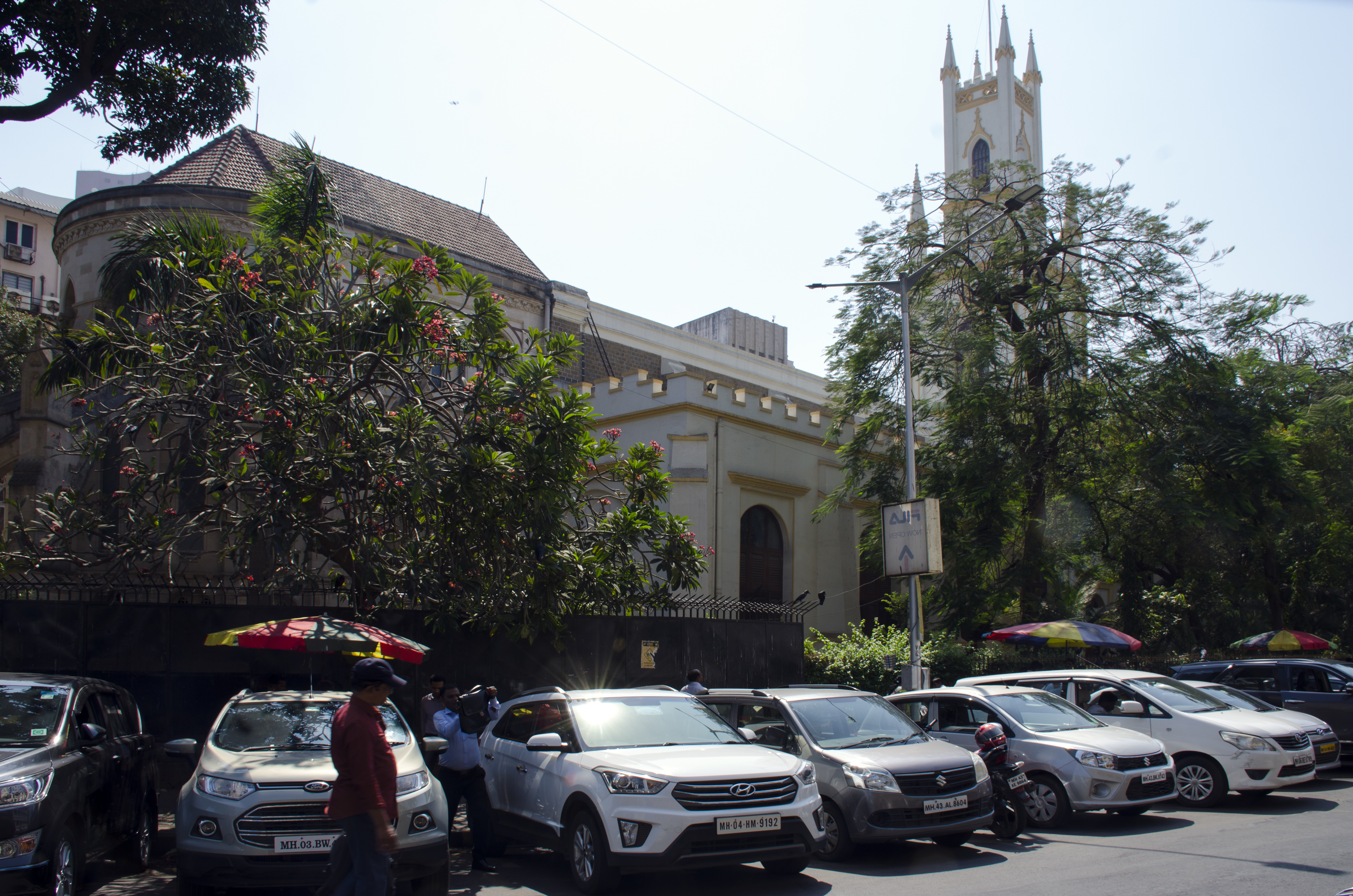
St Thomas Cathedral

== See also ==
- History of Mumbai
