= Diocese of Mumbai (Church of North India) =

Church society in Mumbai

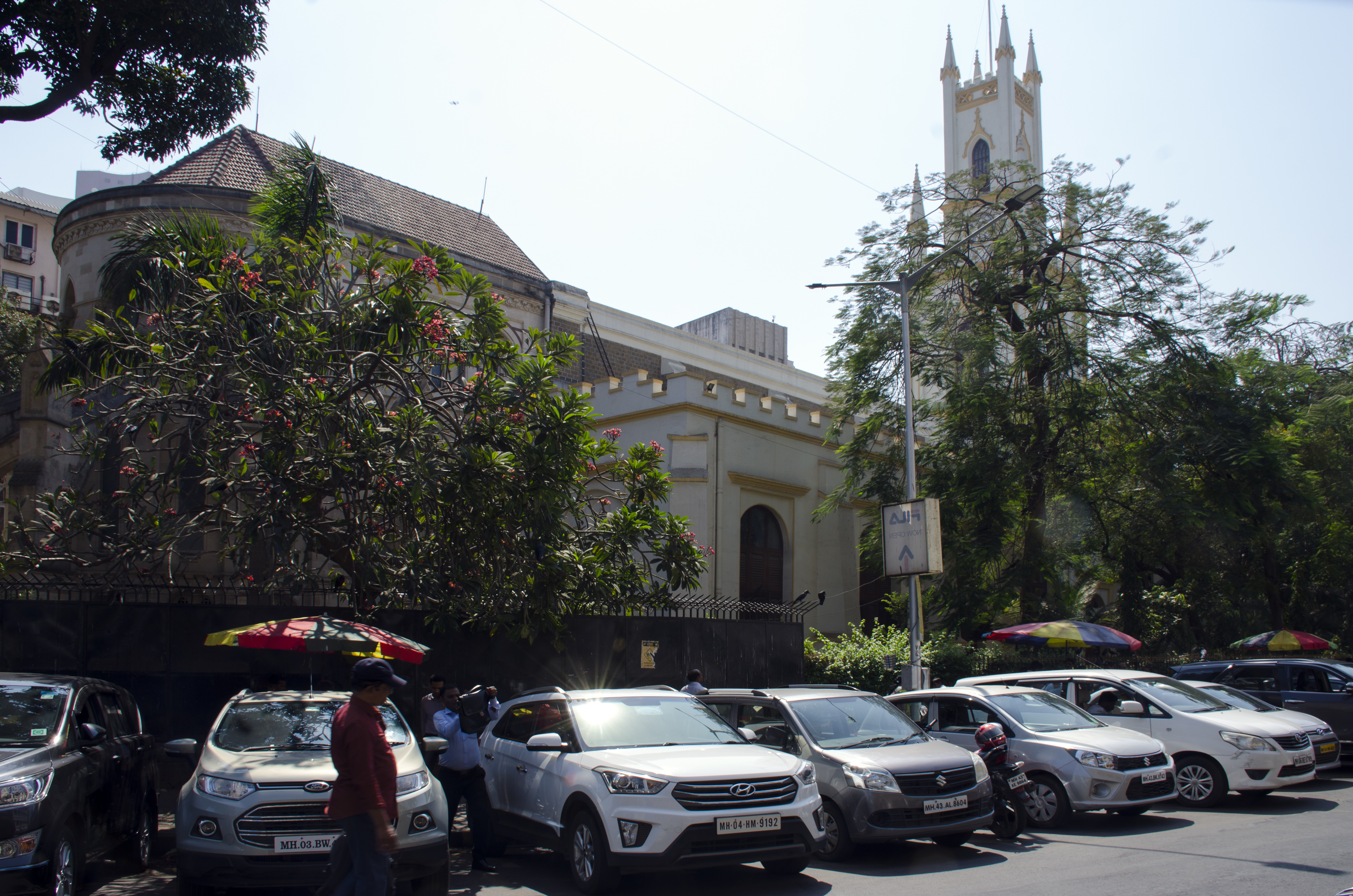
St. Thomas Cathedral, Mumbai

The Diocese of Mumbai of the Church of North India is the Anglican diocese covering metropolitan Mumbai and the state of Maharashtra. The cathedra seat of the Bishop of Mumbai is St. Thomas Cathedral, Mumbai.

Historically known as the Diocese of Bombay from its inception in 1837, it was a diocese of Church of India, Burma and Ceylon, which was renamed the Church of India, Pakistan, Burma and Ceylon in 1947; since then it has been one of its most prominent Dioceses in the Indian subcontinent. In 1842, her jurisdiction was described as "Presidency of Bombay". It is headed by the Anglican Bishop of Bombay.
