= Edward Bickersteth =

Edward Bickersteth is the name of four members of an English ecclesiastical family:

- Edward Bickersteth (priest) (1786–1850), English evangelical priest
- Edward Bickersteth (Dean of Lichfield) (1814–1892), English Anglican priest, nephew of the evangelical priest
- Edward Bickersteth (bishop of Exeter) (1825–1906), English Anglican bishop, son of the evangelical priest
- Edward Bickersteth (bishop of South Tokyo) (1850–1897), English Anglican bishop, son of the Bishop of Exeter
