= Edward Bickersteth (priest) =

English evangelical clergyman (1786–1850)

The Reverend Edward Bickersteth
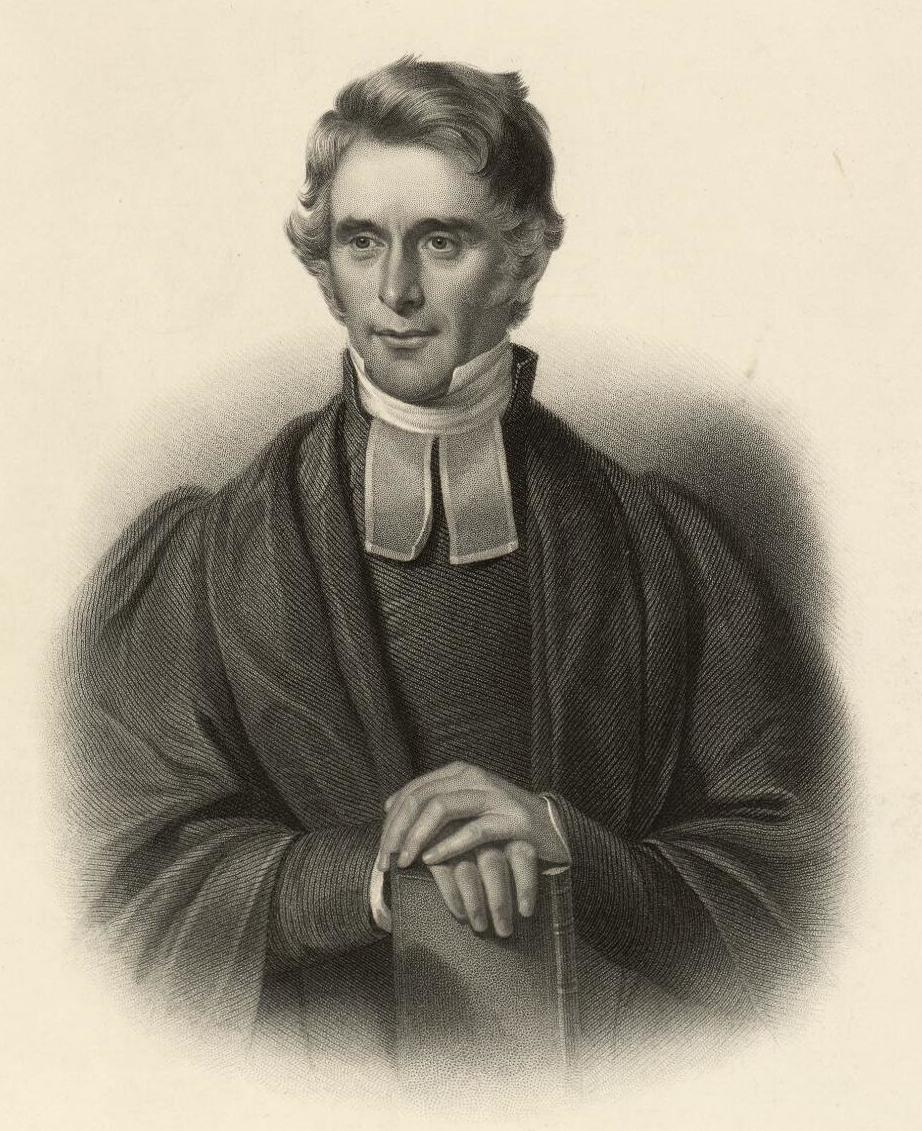
- Portrait of Bickersteth
- Born: 19 March 1786; Kirkby Lonsdale, Cumberland
- Died: 28 February 1850 (aged 63); Watton-at-Stone, Hertfordshire
- Education: Kirkby Lonsdale Grammar School
- Occupation: Clergyman
- Children: Edward Henry Bickersteth

Rev. Edward Bickersteth (19 March 1786 – 28 February 1850) was an English evangelical Anglican clergyman from the prominent Bickersteth family.

== Life ==
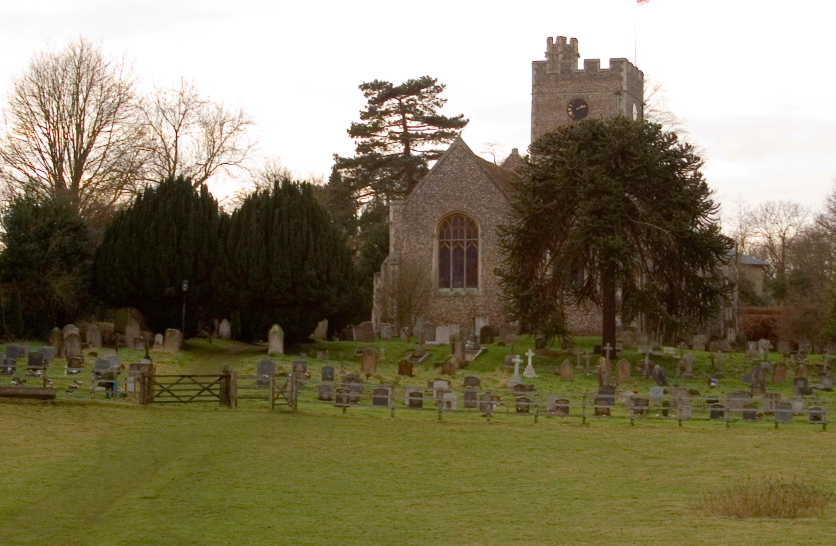
Watton-at-Stone church where Bickersteth worked with Thomas Birks

Bickersteth was born at Kirkby Lonsdale, Westmorland, the fourth son of Henry Bickersteth, a surgeon. Bickersteth attended Kirkby Lonsdale Grammar School and practised as a solicitor at Norwich from 1812 to 1815.

Within the space of only 11 days in December 1815 he was ordained both as a deacon and priest. In January 1816 travelled to Africa to inspect and report on the work of the Church Missionary Society (CMS). He continued to travel overseas in connection with the work of the CMS throughout his life. He was the secretary of the CMS from 1824 to 1831.

On receiving the living of Watton, Hertfordshire, in 1830, he resigned his secretaryship, but continued to lecture and preach, both for the CMS and the Society for the Conversion of the Jews. He was instrumental in the merger of the Anglican Central Committee and the Continental Society in 1840 to form the Foreign Aid Society which supported evangelical Protestant ministry on the continent of Europe.

Bickersteth met Lord Ashley in 1835. The Earl made a visit of several days to Watton Rectory in the summer 1836. Following this visit the pair became friends, with Bickersteth becoming one of the reformer's close advisers.

Bickersteth was a leading speaker at the annual assemblies of the London Society for Promoting Christianity Amongst the Jews, whose activities he keenly supported. He preached at the Episcopal Jews' Chapel in Bethnal Green by 1837. He stood against Jewish emancipation, which he equated with "renounc[ing] our own Christianity and seek[ing] to turn their [i.e. Jewish] hopes from their own inheritance".

He was active in promoting the Evangelical Alliance, whose founding assembly of 1 October 1845 in Liverpool he joined on the conviction that it represented the fulfilment of prophecy, although he had initially hesitated due to the leading role of the Scottish Dissenting Presbyterians in the initiative. He strongly opposed the Tractarian Movement, and was one of the founders of the 1849 created Irish Church Missions, and also of the 1841 created Parker Society, societies. Bickersteth's library was sold at auction by Edmund Hodgson on 17 February 1851 (and 11 following days). It contained over 3900 lots. A copy of the catalogue is available at Cambridge University Library (shelfmark Munby.c.116(6)).

== Writings ==
His works include A Scripture Help (London, 1816), which has been translated into many European languages, and Christian Psalmody (London, 1833), a collection of over 700 hymns, which forms the basis of the Hymnal Companion (London, 1870), compiled by his son, Edward Henry Bickersteth, bishop of Exeter (1885–1890).

The corpus of Bickersteth's texts was published in 15 volumes as The Works of the Rev. Edward Bickersteth with Robert Carter & Brothers in New York in 1855.

== Selected publications ==
- Memoirs of Simeon Wilhelm, a Native of the Susco Country, West Africa; Who Died at the House of the Church Missionary Society, London, Aug. 29, 1817; Aged 17 Years. Together with Some Accounts of the Superstitions of the Inhabitants of West Africa, New Haven, CT: Yale College Society of Enquiry Respecting Missions, 1819
- The Restoration of the Jews to Their Own Land, in Connection with Their Future Conversion and the Final Blessedness of Our Earth, 2nd edn., London: R.B. Seeley and W. Burnside, 1841
- A Practical Guide to the Prophecies: With Reference to Their Interpretation and Fulfilment, and to Personal Edification, 7th edn., London: Seeley, Burnside, and Seeley, 1844
- The Signs of Times in the East; a Warning to the West: Being a Practical View of Our Duties in the Light of the Prophecies Which Illustrate the Present and Future State of the Church and of the World, London: Seeley, Burnside, and Seeley, 1845
- The Divine Warning to the Church, at This Time, of Our Enemies, Dangers, and Duties, and as to Our Future Prospects, 4th edn., London: Seeley, Burnside, and Seeley, 1846
- A Brief Practical View of the Evangelical Alliance; in Regard to Its Character, Principles, Objects, Organization, and Christian Spirit, 3rd edn., London: Seeley, Burnside, and Seeley, 1846

== Family ==
Bickersteth was the brother of Henry, Baron Langdale, Master of the Rolls (1836–1851), and uncle of Robert Bickersteth, Bishop of Ripon (1857–1884).

His wife Sarah, whom Bickersteth married in 1812, was the eldest daughter of Thomas Bignold of Norwich, together they had six children. Edward Henry Bickersteth (1825–1906) Bishop of Exeter was his only son and Edward Bickersteth, founder of the Cambridge Mission to Delhi and later bishop of South Tokyo, his grandson. His son-in-law was Thomas Rawson Birks, his eventual biographer.

Edward Bickersteth, Dean of Lichfield, was his nephew.

== Sources ==
- Birks, Thomas Rawson (1851), Memoir of the Rev. Edward Bickersteth, Late Rector of Watton, Herts, vol. 2, New York: Harper & Brothers
- Curtis, Rodney (2019), "Evangelical Anglican Missionaries and the London Jews Society: Palestine Place at Bethnal Green and Related Developments, 1813–1895", Jewish Historical Studies, 50 (1): 69–100, doi:10.14324/111.444.jhs.2018v50.004
- Gill, Sean (1992), "'In a Peculiar Relation to Christianity': Anglican Attitudes to Judaism in the Era of Political Emancipation, 1830–1858", Studies in Church History, 29: 399–407, doi:10.1017/S0424208400011438
- Wolffe, John (1986), "The Evangelical Alliance in the 1840s: An Attempt to Institutionalise Christian Unity", Studies in Church History, 23: 333–346, doi:10.1017/S0424208400010688
