= John Jennings =

John Jennings may refer to:

== Politicians ==
- John Jenyns (1660–1717), MP
- John Jennings (Burton MP) (1903–1990), British Conservative Party politician
- John Jennings (American politician) (1880–1956), U.S. Representative from Tennessee, 1939–1951
- John Jennings (Australian politician) (1878–1968), federal member for South Sydney and then Watson in the 1930s
- Jack Jennings (politician) (John Joseph Jennings, 1923–1995), member for the electoral district of Ross Smith, 1970–1977
- John Jennings (St Albans MP) (died 1642), English Member of Parliament

== Musicians ==
- John Jennings (musician) (1953–2015), American guitarist, multi-instrumentalist and producer
- John Jennings, bassist for British band The Ruts

== Military ==
- John Jennings (Royal Navy officer) (1664–1743), British admiral and politician
- John Jennings (British Army officer), who played a major part in the Battle of Carrickfergus

== Others ==
- John Edward Jennings (1906–1973), American historical novelist
- John T. Jennings, president of the Royal Society of South Australia, 2008–2010
- Sir John Jennings (businessman) (1937–2024), British oil industry executive officer, Chancellor of Loughborough University, 2003–2010
- John Jennings (clergyman) (1814–1876), Canadian Presbyterian minister
- John Jennings (footballer) (1905–1997), English footballer for Cardiff City, Middlesbrough and Preston
- John Jennings (physician) (fl. 18th century), Irish doctor
- John Jennings (tutor) (1688–1723), English dissenting tutor
- John Jennings (priest) (1798–1883), Archdeacon of Westminster
- John Percival Jennings (1923–2003), horticultural adviser for the South Australian Department of Agriculture
- John Jennings (racing driver), participated in 1970 Greenville 200
- Midgley John Jennings (1806–1857), English missionary, founder of the SPG Mission to Delhi
- John C.T. Jennings, fictional hero of the Jennings books

== See also ==
- John Gennings (c. 1570–1660), biographer of his brother, Edward Gennings, 17th Century martyr
- Jonathan Jennings (1784–1834), governor and congressman
