= Jack Jennings =

Jack Jennings may refer to:

- Jack Jennings (American football) (1927–1993), offensive lineman for the Chicago Cardinals of the NFL
- Jack Jennings (Australian footballer) (1875–1928), player for St Kilda
- Jack Jennings (English footballer) (1902–1997), right half for various teams
- Jack Jennings (basketball, born 1918) (1918–1982), player for the Akron Tire Non-Skids of the NBL
- Jack Jennings (basketball, born 1969) (b. 1969), Western Kentucky forward who played in Europe
- Jack Jennings (politician) (1923–1995), Australian Labour Party politician
- Jack Jennings (veteran) (1919–2024), English World War II centenarian

== See also ==
- John Jennings (disambiguation)
