= Banningham =

Village in Norfolk, England

Coordinates: 52.817°N 1.288°E

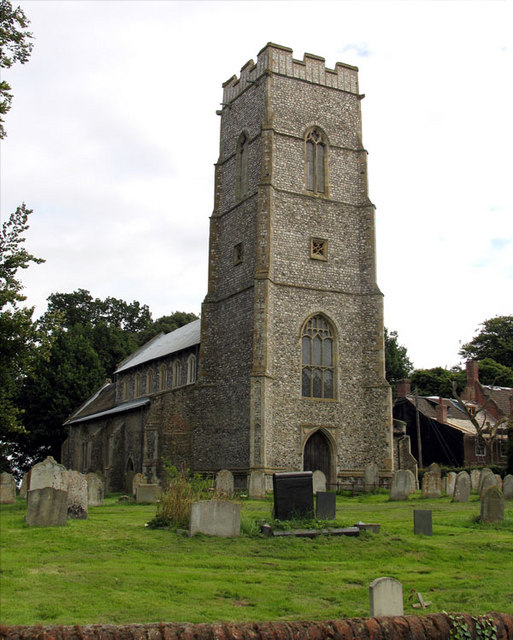
- Saint Botolph parish church, Banningham

- Location within Norfolk
  - London: 129 miles (208 km)
- Civil parish: Colby
- District: North Norfolk
- Shire county: Norfolk
- Region: East
- Country: England
- Sovereign state: United Kingdom
- Post town: NORWICH
- Postcode district: NR11
- Dialling code: 01263
- Police: Norfolk
- Fire: Norfolk
- Ambulance: East of England

Banningham is a village and former civil parish, now in the parish of Colby, in the North Norfolk district, in the English county of Norfolk. The village is 3 miles (4.8 km) north-east of Aylsham, 15 miles (24 km) north of Norwich and 129 miles (208 km) north-east of London. The nearest railway station is at North Walsham Railway station on the Bittern Line from Cromer to Norwich. The nearest airport is Norwich International Airport. The village lies a small distance east from the A140 Cromer to Norwich road. In 1931 the parish had a population of 207.

== History ==
Banningham has an entry in the Domesday Book of 1086. In the great book Banningham is recorded by the names Banincha, and Hamingeha. The main landholders are William de Warenne and the Abbot of Holm. The main tenant is Roger holding his land from Reynald FitzIvo.

On 1 April 1935 the parish was abolished and merged with Colby.

== Amenities ==
The village has a village hall and public house.

== Saint Botolph parish church ==
The parish church dates from the 14th century. The church's most notable feature is its steep-pitched hammerbeam roof with seven angels along each side. The spandrels are adorned with tracery in wheels and other elaborate forms. Two of the windows have 15th-century glass in the tracery. In the north window, stained glass depicts Archangel Gabriel calling Mary. The interior also has several wall paintings, notably one of Saint George slaying the Dragon, and one of the feet of Saint Christopher. The church is a Grade I listed building .

== Notable people ==
Edward Bickersteth (1850–1897) was the founder of the Cambridge Mission to Delhi and in 1886 appointed Bishop of South Tokyo. He was a leading figure in the early years of the Anglican Church in Japan. He was born at Banningham where his father Edward Henry Bickersteth served as curate at St Botolph's Church. The elder Bickersteth, a noted poet and Cambridge scholar, was appointed Bishop of Exeter from 1885 to 1900.
