= Central Theological College, Tokyo =

Coordinates: 35.37224°N 139.38279°E

Central Theological College
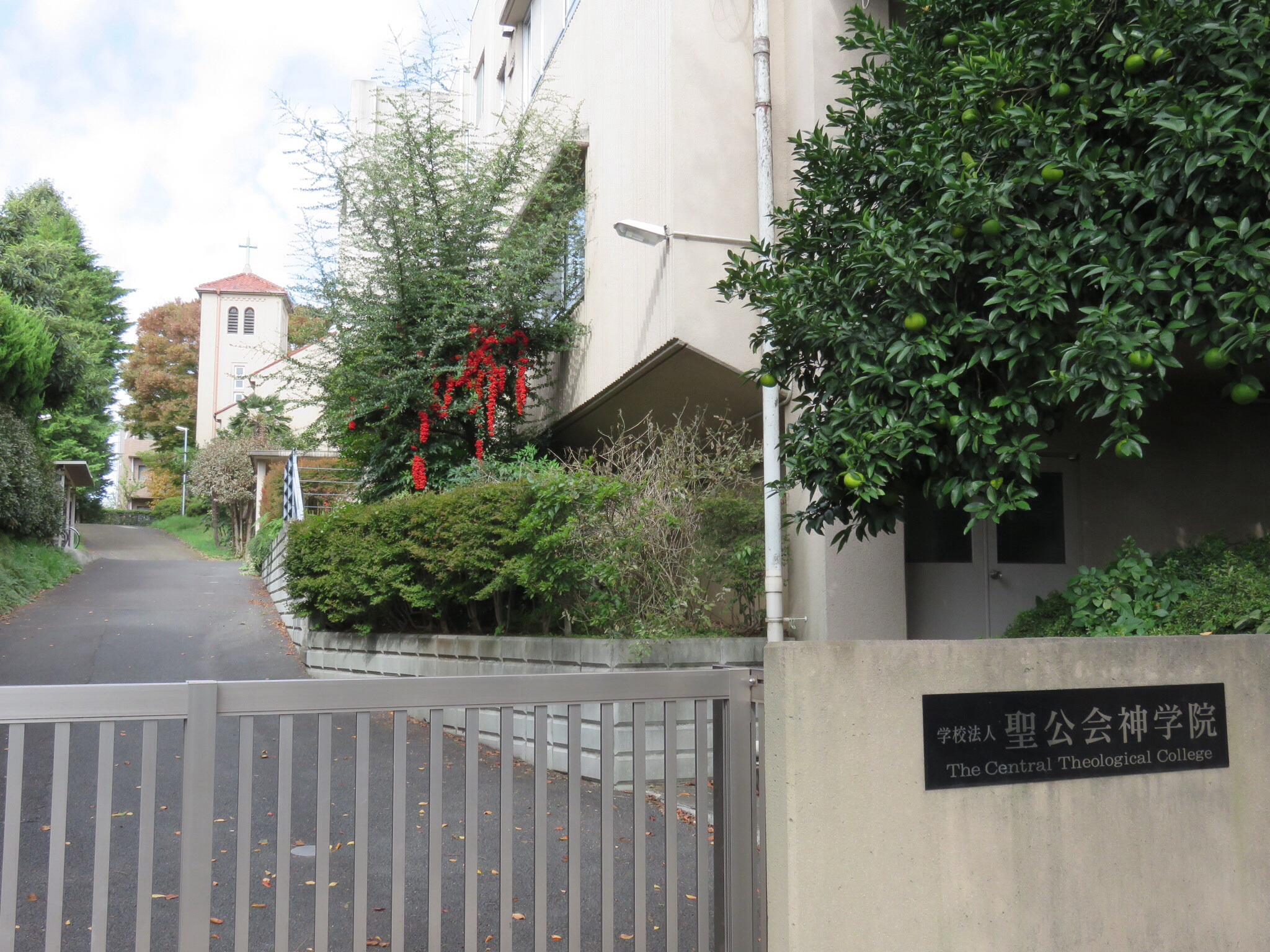
- Central Theological College, Tokyo
- Type: Anglican theological college
- Established: 1908; 118 years ago
- Affiliations: Nippon Sei Ko Kai
- Academic staff: 4 full-time, 14 part-time tutorial staff
- Administrative staff: 2 full-time
- Location: Tokyo, Japan
- Website: www.ctc.ac.jp

The Central Theological College (Japanese: 聖公会神学院 Seikōkai Shingakuin) is the Anglican theological college of the Nippon Sei Ko Kai in Yōga, Setagaya, Tokyo, Japan.

Founded in 1908 from the amalgamation of three older Japanese Anglican seminaries it has trained more than 600 lay and ordained graduates for work in the Anglican Church in Japan.

== History ==
Prior to the formal opening of the college in 1912, graduate level study and clergy training in the Anglican Church in Japan was divided between three separate schools; the Trinity Divinity School in Tsukiji, Tokyo established by the Episcopal Church mission in 1877; the CMS sponsored Holy Trinity School in Osaka in established in 1884 and the SPG sponsored school at St. Andrew's Church, Shiba Koen, Tokyo established in 1886.

The idea of a central theological college in Tokyo to train all Japanese clergy was first mooted by Bishop William Awdry. Initial funding for the college came from a grant approved at the Pan-Anglican Congress held in London in 1908. The first buildings of the college were located at Ikebukuro opposite the main campus of Rikkyo University. The intention being that students would spend three years in the college department of the university studying a broad liberal arts curriculum, and then three years focused on ministry training in the theological college. Initial staffing of the college was drawn from the ranks of the Episcopal, SPG and CMS missions each contributing one overseas missionary and one experienced Japanese clergy. The first college Principal was the Rev. John Toshimichi Imai.

Between 1913 and 1919 British theologian Fr. Herbert Kelly SSM served as Professor of Apologetics at the college.

The college buildings and library were destroyed by Allied incendiary bombing in the closing stages of the Second World War. The college relocated to its current suburban location at Yōga, Setagaya, in 1953.

== Daily life ==
All resident students are expected to attend Matins and Evensong in the college chapel. Sundays, students are expected to join local parish churches as part of their pastoral formation.

Both single and married full-time students are given the opportunity to live in accommodation on the college grounds. The college also provides on site housing for faculty.

== Programmes ==
The college offers the following degree programmes:

- Bachelor of Divinity (B.D.)

Normally a three-year full-time residential program as a pathway to ordination in the Anglican Church in Japan.

- Master of Theology (M.Th)

On submission of a graduating thesis usually one year full-time or two years part-time. Available for ordination candidates and external lay students.

The college also serves as a center for lay ministry training. All courses at the college are taught in Japanese. Through grants made available from overseas mission societies, English-language library resources are also available on site.

== See also ==
- Anglican Church in Japan
