= Joseph John =

Joseph John is the name of:

- Joseph John (Reverend) (1906 -1998), reverend of the Church of South India
- Joe John (born 1939), member of the North Carolina House of Representatives
- Joseph A. John (1880 - 1943), Black Catholic priest for the Society of African Missions and later the Archdiocese of Port of Spain
