= Charles Freer Andrews =

Christian missionary and social reformer in India (1871–1940)

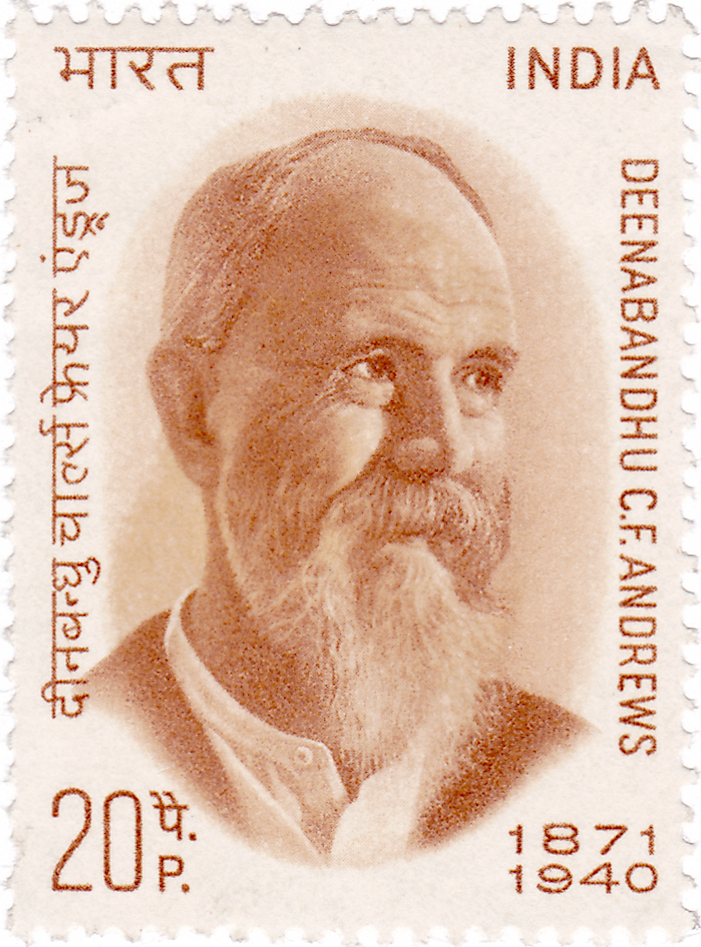
- Charles Freer Andrews 1971 stamp of India
- Born: 12 February 1871; Newcastle-upon-Tyne, Northumberland, England
- Died: 5 April 1940 (aged 69); Calcutta, Bengal Presidency, British India
- Education: Pembroke College, Cambridge
- Occupations: Anglican priest, missionary, educator, social reformer
- Known for: Indian independence activism and friendship with Mahatma Gandhi

Charles Freer Andrews (12 February 1871 – 5 April 1940) was an English Anglican priest and Christian missionary, educator and social reformer, and an activist for Indian independence. He became a close friend of Rabindranath Tagore and Mahatma Gandhi and identified with the Indian liberation struggle. He was instrumental in persuading Gandhi to return to India from South Africa, where Gandhi had been a leading light in the campaign for Indian civil rights.

Andrews was affectionately dubbed Christ's Faithful Apostle by Gandhi, based on his initials, C. F. A. For his contributions to the Indian independence movement, Gandhi and his students at St. Stephen's College, Delhi, named him Deenabandhu, or "Friend of the Poor".

== Early life ==
Charles Freer Andrews was born on 12 February 1871 at 14 Brunel Terrace, Newcastle upon Tyne, Northumberland, United Kingdom. His father, John Edwin Andrews, was the "Angel" (bishop) of the Catholic Apostolic Church in Birmingham. Charles was one of 14 children. The family had suffered financial misfortune because of the duplicity of a friend, and had to work hard to make ends meet. Andrews was a student at King Edward's School, Birmingham, and afterwards read Classics at Pembroke College, Cambridge, ultimately being awarded the Carus Greek Testament Prize in 1895. During this period, he moved away from his family's church and was accepted for ordination in the Church of England.

In 1896, Andrews became a deacon and took over the Pembroke College Mission in south London. A year later, he was made a priest and became Vice-Principal of Westcott House Theological College in Cambridge.

In 1899, Andrews was elected as a fellow at Pembroke College, Cambridge.

== In India ==
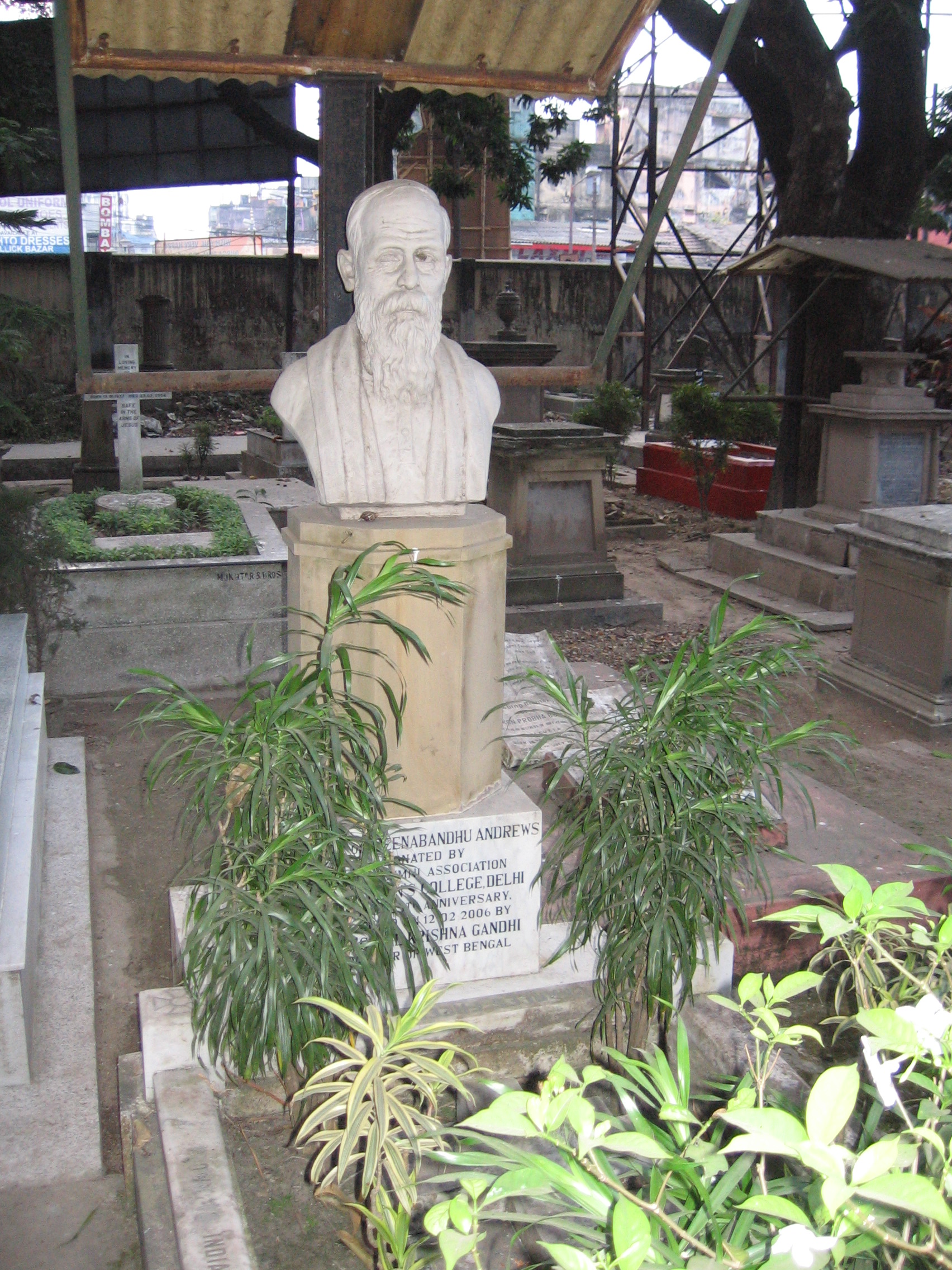
The bust of C.F. Andrews over his grave, in Lower Circular Road Christian Cemetery – Kolkata (earlier Calcutta)

Andrews had been involved in the Christian Social Union since university, and was interested in exploring the relationship between a commitment to the Gospel and a commitment to justice, through which he was attracted to struggles for justice throughout the British Empire, especially in India.

In 1906, he stood in as principal of the Lawrence Asylum (later school) in Sanawar.

In 1904, he joined the Cambridge Mission to Delhi and arrived there to teach philosophy at St. Stephen's College, where he grew close to many of his Indian colleagues and students. Increasingly dismayed by the racist behaviour and treatment of Indians by some British officials and civilians, he supported Indian political aspirations, and wrote a letter to the Civil and Military Gazette newspaper in 1906 voicing these sentiments. Andrews soon became involved in the activities of the Indian National Congress, and he helped to resolve the 1913 cotton workers' strike in Madras.

== With Gandhi in South Africa ==
Known for his persuasiveness, intellect and moral rectitude, Andrews was asked by senior Indian political leader Gopal Krishna Gokhale to visit South Africa and help the Indian community there to resolve their political disputes with the Government. Arriving in January 1914, he met the 44-year-old Gujarati lawyer, Mohandas Gandhi, who was leading the Indian community's efforts against the racial discrimination and police legislation that infringed their civil liberties. Andrews was deeply impressed with Gandhi's knowledge of Christian values and his espousal of the concept of ahimsa (nonviolence) – something that Gandhi mixed with inspiration from elements of Christian anarchism.

Andrews served as Gandhi's aide in his negotiations with General Jan Smuts and was responsible for finalizing some of the finer details of their interactions.

Following the advice of several Indian Congress leaders and of Principal Susil Kumar Rudra, of St. Stephen's College, Andrews was instrumental in persuading Gandhi to return to India with him in 1915.

== Tagore ==
In 1918, Andrews disagreed with Gandhi's attempts to recruit combatants for World War I, believing that this was inconsistent with their views on nonviolence. In Mahatma Gandhi's Ideas, Andrews wrote about Gandhi's recruitment campaign: "Personally I have never been able to reconcile this with his own conduct in other respects, and it is one of the points where I have found myself in painful disagreement."

Andrews was elected President of the All India Trade Union in 1925 and 1927.

Andrews developed a dialogue between Christians and Hindus. He spent a lot of time at Santiniketan in conversation with the poet and philosopher Rabindranath Tagore. He also supported the movement to ban the ‘untouchability of outcasts’. In 1919 he joined the famous Vaikom Satyagraha, and in 1933 assisted B.R. Ambedkar in formulating the demands of the Dalits.

He and Agatha Harrison arranged for Gandhi's visit to the UK. He accompanied Gandhi to the second Round Table Conference in London, helping him to negotiate with the British government on matters of Indian autonomy and devolution.

== In Fiji ==
When the news reached India, through the writings of Christian missionaries J. W. Burton, Hannah Dudley, and R. Piper and a returned indentured labourer, Totaram Sanadhya, of the mistreatment of Indian indentured labourers in Fiji, the Indian Government in September 1915 sent Andrews and William W. Pearson to make inquiries. The two visited numerous plantations and interviewed indentured labourers, overseers and Government officials and on their return to India also interviewed returned labourers. In their "Report on Indentured Labour in Fiji" Andrews and Pearson highlighted the ills of the indenture system; which led to the end of further transportation of Indian labour to the British colonies. In 1917 Andrews made a second visit to Fiji, and although he reported some improvements, was still appalled at the moral degradation of indentured labourers. He called for an immediate end to indenture; and the system of Indian indentured labour was formally abolished in 1920.

In 1936, while on a visit to Australia and New Zealand, Andrews was invited to and visited Fiji again. The ex-indentured labourers and their descendants wanted him to help them overcome a new type of slavery, by which they were bound to the Colonial Sugar Refining Company, which controlled all aspects of their lives. Andrews, however, was delighted with the improvements in conditions since his last visit, and asked Fiji Indians to "remember that Fiji belonged to the Fijians and they were there as guests."

== Later life ==
About this time Gandhi reasoned with Andrews that it was probably best for sympathetic Britons like himself to leave the freedom struggle to Indians. Accordingly, from 1935 onwards Andrews began to spend more time in Britain, teaching young people all over the country about Christ's call to radical discipleship. Gandhi's affectionate nickname for Andrews was Christ's Faithful Apostle, based on the initials of his name, "C.F.A". He was widely known as Gandhi's closest friend and was perhaps the only major figure to address Gandhi by his first name, Mohan.

=== Death ===
Andrews died on 5 April 1940, during a visit to Calcutta, and is buried in the Christian burial ground of Lower Circular Road cemetery, Calcutta.

== Commemoration ==
In 1948, Joseph John, pastor in Katpadi, was so inspired by Gandhi's and Andrews‘ ideas, that he left his ministry to serve the poor and casteless in a remote area in Chittoor district of Andhra Pradesh and founded a village/ Rural Life Centre, which he called Deenabandupuram.

Andrews was a major character, portrayed by British actor Ian Charleson in the 1982 film Gandhi by Richard Attenborough. He is honored with a Lesser Feast on the liturgical calendar of the Episcopal Church in the United States of America on February 12.

In 1971, India issued a commemorative postage stamp to mark the birth centenary of Andrews.

In 2024, it was announced that Newcastle City Council plans to install a plaque at 14 Brunel Terrace, the birthplace of Andrews, to commemorate his life.

== Legacy ==
Andrews is widely commemorated and respected in India. Several colleges and hospitals, across India, have been named after him.

- Dinabandhu Andrews College: The Dinabandhu Andrews College located in Garia, south Kolkata was constituted with an aim of disseminating higher education to a huge number of children of the displaced persons from erstwhile East Pakistan, presently Bangladesh.
- Dinabandhu Institution: Dinabandhu Institution, also known as Shibpur Dinobundhoo Institution, established in 1948, is an undergraduate college in Howrah, West Bengal. It is affiliated to the University of Calcutta
- Dinabandhu Andrews Institute of Technology and Management (DAITM): Established in 2002. Affiliated to MAKAUT. Offers UG and PG courses in Management and Technology
- Deenabandhu Hospital: Located in Thachampara, Palakkad, Kerala

== Publications ==
- Hakim Ajmal Khan A sketch of his life and career. Madras: G. A. Natesan. (1922)
- The Relation of Christianity to the Conflict between Capital and Labour (1896)
- The Renaissance in India: its Missionary Aspect (1912)
- Non-Co-Operation. Madras: Ganesh & Co. 1920.
- Christ and Labour (1923)
- Mahatma Gandhi His Life and Works (1930) republished by Starlight Paths Publishing (2007) with a foreword by Arun Gandhi
- What I Owe to Christ (1932)
- The Sermon on the Mount (1942)

== See also ==
- Delhi Brotherhood Society
