= Alexander Croft Shaw =

19th-century Canadian Anglican missionary in Japan

The Venerable Alexander Croft Shaw
- Missionary
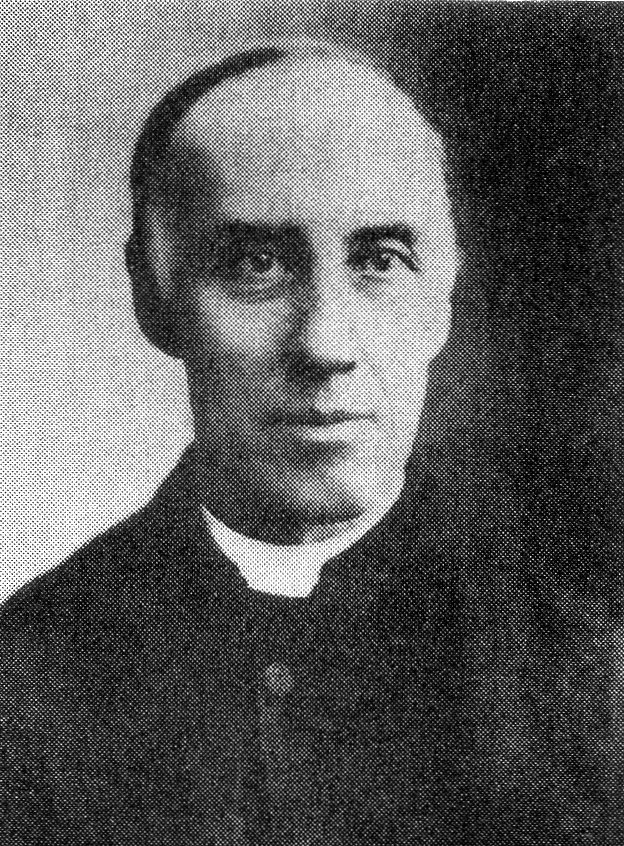
- Alexander Croft Shaw

Personal details
- Born: June 26, 1846 Toronto, Canada
- Died: 13 March 1902 (aged 55) Tokyo, Japan

Alexander Croft Shaw M.A. (26 June 1846 – 13 March 1902) was a minister of the Anglican Church of Canada. He is remembered as Archdeacon Shaw, minister to the British Legation in Tokyo and a leading figure in the early years of the Anglican Church in Japan.

== Background and early life ==
Born in Toronto, Canada on June 26, 1846, the eldest son of Major Alex Shaw and his wife Grace McQueen, Alexander Croft Shaw was a descendant of a noted Scottish family of professional soldiers. Educated at Trinity University, now a constituent college of the University of Toronto, Shaw graduated with a First-class B.A. in Theology in 1867 and received his master's degree two years later. Following a brief period as a parish priest in Canada, Shaw travelled to England and served under the Rev. Edward Lewes Cutts, Vicar of Holy Trinity, Haverstock Hill, located in the London Borough of Camden.

On December 20, 1872, Shaw attended a meeting at the Royal Albert Hall in memory of murdered missionary Bishop John Coleridge Patteson. Bishop Samuel Wilberforce was the main speaker at the Royal Albert Hall meeting and Shaw subsequently resolved to volunteer for church mission work in either China or Japan

== Missionary Work in Japan ==
Journeying first via the United States and landing in Yokohama on September 25, 1873, Shaw arrived with William Ball Wright under the auspices of the Society for Propagation of the Gospel as the Society's first missionaries to Japan. After consultation with British Envoy Sir Harry Smith Parkes, Shaw and Wright chose to live outside the confines of the foreign concession at Tsukiji in order to better minister and engage with the local population. With the help of British Legation staff both were able to find living quarters in the Daishoji Temple (大松寺) in the Mita district of central Tokyo.

=== Association with Fukuzawa Yukichi ===
In the spring of 1874 Shaw took up residence in the home of Fukuzawa Yukichi, founder of Keio Gijuku Daigaku, initially as the teacher of Fukuzawa's three eldest children, but also having the opportunity to teach ethics classes to students at Keio Gijuku Daigaku itself.

Shaw stayed with Fukuzawa and his family for two years while conducting Sunday School classes at the Daishoji temple. He became highly proficient in the Japanese language and as early as 1875 was collaborating with his language teacher, Tajimi Juro, in writing responses to Japanese language newspapers when Christian doctrines and practices were publicly questioned or misunderstood.

Due to his teaching position in one of the leading Western studies schools in Japan, Shaw was able to engage with and later baptize young Christian converts who would later become prominent political and business leaders of Japan. In the four years from 1873 to 1877, Shaw and Wright were able to draw 150 people to Christianity including Yamagata Yokoni, subsequently ordained as the first Japanese deacon in the Anglican Church in Japan.

=== Establishment of a Mission Church ===
In 1879 Shaw was able to establish St. Andrew's Church on an elevated piece of ground at Shiba Koen, which soon became the center of Anglican Christian worship and clergy training in Tokyo. St. Andrew's, intended by Shaw primarily as a mission church for his Japanese congregation, became one of the first Anglican churches in Japan to have an autonomous, indigenous ministry when in 1894, John Toshimichi Imai was appointed rector.

The original 1879 church, a red brick structure, designed by Charles Alfred Chastel de Boinville, was financed in part by contributions from foreign residents in Tokyo under the direction of Parkes as Chairman of the Church Committee. From its earliest days the church building was a shared resource between Japanese and English-speaking congregations with members of the foreign community attending services conducted by Armine F. King. Although the original building was destroyed by an earthquake in 1894, and a subsequent structure was lost in the 1944 Allied incendiary bombing, the rebuilt St. Andrew's Church, now known as St. Andrew's Cathedral is the current Cathedral Church of the Tokyo Diocese of the Nippon Sei Ko Kai.

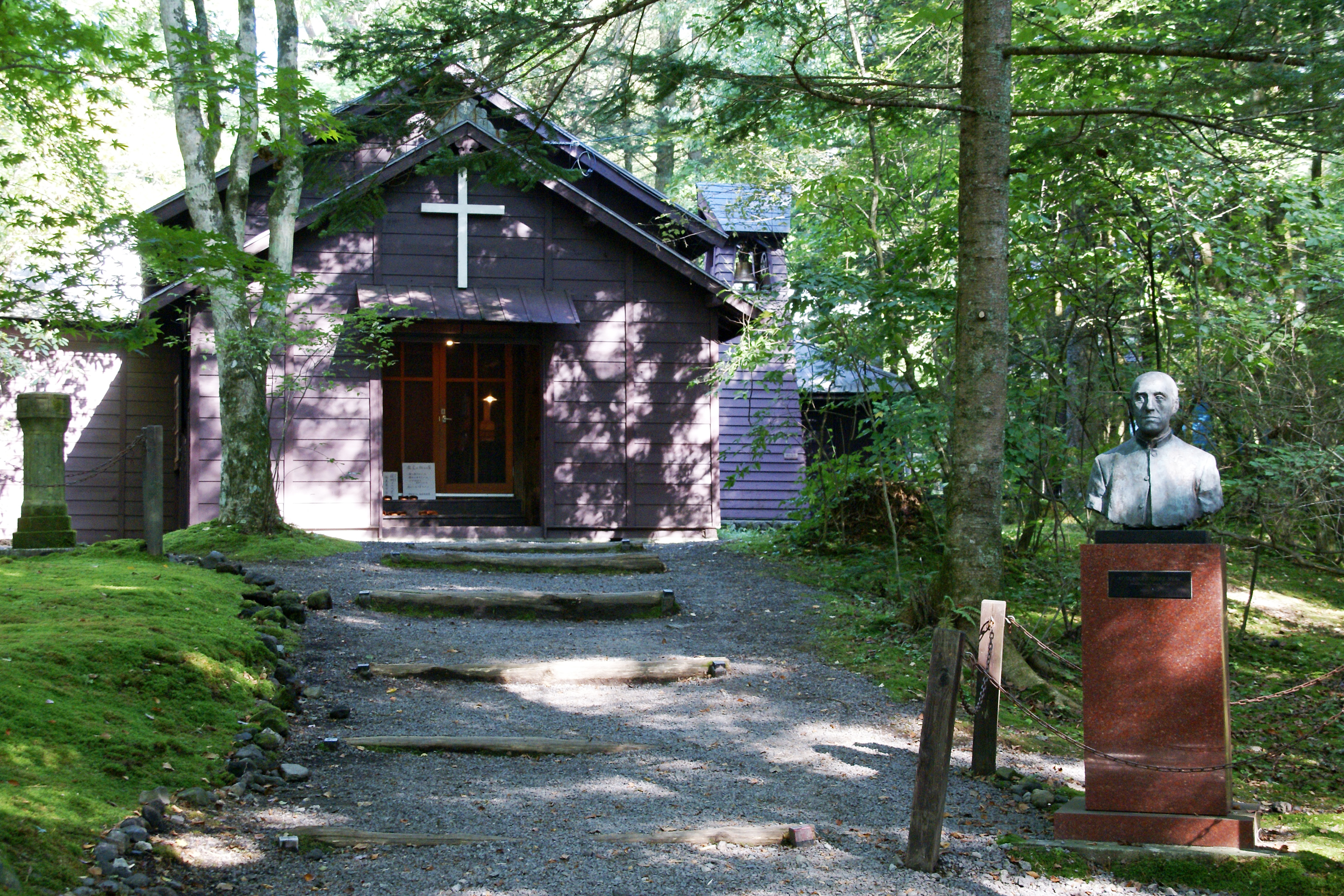
Shaw Memorial Chapel, Karuizawa

Shaw and James Main Dixon are credited with popularizing Karuizawa as a summer resort as a result of their visit in 1886. The Shaw Memorial Chapel and Shaw House nearby, a reconstruction of the timber-framed Summer house enjoyed by Shaw and his family in the 1890s, are popular visitor attractions close to Karuizawa Old Town.

In 1886 Edward Bickersteth was appointed Anglican Bishop for Japan and took up residence in Tokyo and was to remain for eleven years. Bishop Bickersteth appointed Shaw Archdeacon for Northern Japan in 1888.

=== Public Advocacy and Recognition ===
Shaw was active in lobbying for the revision of the unequal treaties and extraterritoriality that characterized early Meiji era Anglo-Japanese relations. With the approval of Bickersteth, Shaw drew up a memorial notice in 1890 to the British Minister Hugh Fraser, signed by all British Anglican mission staff in Tokyo, calling for the abolition of extraterritorial clauses in the treaties.

As honorary chaplain to the British Legation, Shaw was an official guest on the 29 November 1890 at the first State Opening of Parliament by Emperor Meiji. After the passing of the revised Anglo-Japanese Treaty of Commerce and Navigation in 1894, Archdeacon Shaw was formally thanked by the Japanese Government for his services in presenting Japanese opinions and culture to the outside world.

Shaw died in Tokyo in 1902 of heart failure following a bout of influenza and was buried at Aoyama Cemetery.

On Shaw's death, his widow was presented by the Emperor with the sum of 1,000 Yen in token of his appreciation of Shaw's services to the nation.

== Family ==
On the 20 February 1875, Shaw married Englishwoman, Mary Ann Cattell (1850–1921), at a ceremony held at the British Embassy in Tokyo. Three of their children, Alexander (1876), Norman (1878) and Dorothea were born in Tokyo. A third son, Ronald was born in London in 1883.

Their eldest son, Alexander James Mackintosh Shaw graduated from the University of Oxford, and married Eve Grace Woodroffe. Serving in the British Army as a Captain in the 1st Battalion, Kings Own Scottish Borderers, he was killed in action during the Battle of the Somme near Beaumont-Hamel France on 9 July 1916. His name is commemorated on the memorial to allied soldiers of World War I at the Yokohama Foreign General Cemetery.

Norman Rymer Shaw, married Australian missionary Kathleen Mercy Goode in Tokyo on 16 November 1907. For a time they lived and worked in either Antung or Antung, China. Norman Shaw wrote articles for Imperial Maritime Customs of China on "The Soya Bean of Manchuria" (1911), "Silk" (1917) and "Chinese Forest Trees and Timber Supply".
