= Delhi Brotherhood Society =

The Delhi Brotherhood Society has its origin in the Cambridge Mission to Delhi, an 1877 Anglican church mission to India established by graduates of Cambridge University. Guided by Bishop and Regius Professor of Divinity Brooke Foss Westcott and under the leadership of Rev. Edward Bickersteth the missionaries lived in a quasi-monastic community that came to be known as the Cambridge Brotherhood. Responding to an invitation to start a college in Delhi the Cambridge Brotherhood established in 1881 what became known as St. Stephen’s College, Delhi. It is now one of the leading and most prestigious university colleges in India. In 1885, they also contributed to found St Stephen's Hospital, Delhi, the oldest and one of the largest private hospitals in Delhi.

== Development ==
With changing times the Brothers stood up to respond to the reality of poverty around them. They extended their service towards the betterment of the poor and the downtrodden. Members like C. F. Andrews took an active role in the plight of workers especially in exposing the evils of indentured labour, as well as in the Indian Independence Movement. This earned him the title of honour ‘Deenabandhu’ ("Friend of the poor") from Mahatma Gandhi to whom he was a close friend. Rev. Ian Weathrall, the last British member of the Church of North India's Delhi Brotherhood (died 30 April 2013, aged 91) helped a group of leprosy patients to regain their dignity in society by helping them to become economically independent. Rev. James Stuart contributed volumes of scholarly work for the ISPCK and was closely associated with Swami Abhishiktananda, a pioneer in interreligious dialogue.

== A Vision for a Better World ==
Though the members of the Brotherhood had been involved in educational, vocational and health care programmes for the poor, marginalized and weaker segments of society since as early as 1887, the Brotherhood was officially registered as the Delhi Brotherhood Society in 1973 under the Societies Registration Act XXI of 1860, in order to extend its activities into the field of social work.

The Brothers continue to lead a monastic way of life and take a significant part in Church related activities as well as in many social development programmes. Today, the Delhi Brotherhood Society (DBS) is one of the prominent NGO’s based in Delhi. The organization strives to work for the social and economic development of the deprived and underprivileged communities by providing whatever practical help they need in the form of information, advice, capacity building, organizing for training and funds. Since 1973, DBS has managed an ever-growing number of projects: schools (from preschool to secondary educational levels), vocational technical training centre, night shelter for street and working children, boys home, child development and community study centres, childline (service to children in distress in East Delhi District), women empowerment programmes, old age home, general relief and work for leprosy patients, agricultural farm project, etc.

Some new programmes are carried out in partnership with the State Government of Delhi and/or the Central Government like a national pension scheme for the unorganized sector of workers (Delhi, Uttar Pradesh and Bihar), a gender resource centre (Delhi) and a targeted intervention programme for HIV/AIDS (in partnership with Delhi State AIDS Control Society). Queen Elizabeth II visited the Delhi Brotherhood Society in 1997. In line with the vision of the founders, the Delhi Brotherhood Society also founded the Abhishiktananda Centre for Interreligious Dialogue in December 2007, to foster dialogue and harmony among the different spiritual traditions of India. The DBS extends hospitality to friends from outside Delhi and overseas. It offers residential facilities for visitors, students and volunteers to offer their time for the work of the Brotherhood or to do their own research and study.
