= List of works by Hugh Boyd M'Neile =

Hugh Boyd M‘Neile (1795-1879) was a prolific author, mainly on religious matters. The following list his different works in the order of their publication:

Note: His family name, M‘Neile, may also appear as MacNeile, Macneile, Mac Neile, McNeile or McNeile.

- M‘Neile, H., A Sermon (on Acts 2:11) for the Irish society of London, Preached in Percy Chapel, Charlotte Street, Rathbone Place, on Tuesday, the sixth of April, 1824, by the Rev. Hugh M‘Neile, J. Hatchard and Son, (London), 1825.
- McNeile, H., Seventeen Sermons by the Rev. Hugh McNeile, A.M., Rector of Albury, Surrey, Chaplain to His Excellency the Lord Lieutenant of Ireland, and to His Grace the Archbishop of Dublin, J. Hatchard and Son, (London), 1825.
- M‘Neile, H., A Sermon Preached at the Parish Church of St. Paul, Covent Garden, on Thursday Evening, May 5, 1826, Before the London Society for Promoting Christianity Amongst the Jews, J. Duncan, (London), 1826
- M‘Neile, H., The Abominations of Babylon. A Sermon (on Revelation 18:4) Preached in behalf of the Continental Society, in the Church of St. Clement Danes, Strand, on Monday, May 8, 1826, by the Rev. Hugh M‘Neile, A.M. Chaplain to his Excellency the Lord Lieutenant of Ireland, and to his Grace the Archbishop of Dublin, Sherwood, Gilbert & Piper, (London), 1826.
- M‘Neile, H., Three Sermons (on Acts 24:25, Jeremiah 2:19, and Daniel 2:44), Preached Before the Judges, at the Assizes Held in the County of Surrey, in the Year 1826, by the Rev. Hugh M‘Neile, A.M.; Published by Desire of the High Sheriff, James Nisbet, (London), 1827.
- M‘Neile, H., Papal Restrictions on the Reading of the Holy Scriptures: A Discourse (on Romans 3:1,2), Delivered at Tavistock Chapel, Drury Lane, on Tuesday, February 12, 1828; in the Course of Lectures on the Points in Controversy Between Romanists and Protestants, James Nisbet, (London), 1828.
- McNeile, H., The Times of the Gentiles, John Hatchard and Son, (London), 1828.
- M‘Neile, H., Popery Theological: Another Challenge!, Reply of the Rev. Hugh M‘Neile, Rector of Albury, Surrey, to the Rev. Joseph Sidden, Roman Catholic Priest, Sutton Park, Surrey, J. Hatchard & Sons, (London), 1829.
- M‘Neile, H., England's Protest is England's Shield (Second Edition), J. Hatchard and Son, (London), 1829.
- M‘Neile, H., Popular Lectures on the Prophecies Relative to the Jewish Nation, J. Hatchard and Son, (London), 1830.
- M‘Neile, H., Miracles and Spiritual Gifts; by the Rev. Hugh M‘Neile, A.M., Rector of Albury, Surrey, James Nisbet, (London), 1832.
- M‘Neile, H., Discrimination in Doctrine (A sermon on Jeremiah 15:19 preached on 6 February 1834), 1834.
- M‘Neile, H., Discrimination in Doctrine (A sermon on Jeremiah 15:19 preached on 6 February 1834), The Pulpit, Vol.23, No.15, (1834), pp. 225–235.
- M‘Neile, H., Five Lectures on Episcopacy & Church Establishments: Delivered at Percy Chapel, Fitzroy Square, During the Months of February, March, and April, 1834; Reprinted from the British Pulpit, British Pulpit Office, (London), 1834.
- M‘Neile, H., Letters to a Friend (viz., Spencer Perceval (1795-1859)) Who has felt it his Duty to Secede from the Church of England, and Who Imagines that the Miraculous Gifts of the Holy Ghost are Revived Among the Seceders, J. Hatchard and Son, (London), 1834.
- McNeile, H., The Apostolical Origin of Episcopacy, (London), 1834.
- M‘Neile, H., The Importance of Discrimination with Regard to Christian Doctrine, (London), 1834.
- M‘Neile, H., The Lord’s Supper: the Obligations of Christians to Receive it, the Nature of it, Objections Answered, James Nisbet, (London), 1834.
- M‘Neile, H., Sermons on the Second Advent of the Lord Jesus Christ: Preached in St. Jude's Church, Liverpool, J. Hatchard, (London), 1835.
- M‘Neile, H., The Character of the Church of Rome: A Sermon Preached at St Andrews Church, Liverpool on Wednesday, the 27th January, 1836, George Smith, (Liverpool), 1836.
- McNeile, H., Speech of the Rev. Hugh McNeile, Minister of St. Jude's, Liverpool, at a meeting of the Protestant Association, in Warrington, on Monday evening, June 13th, 1836, C. Malley, (Warrington), 1836.
- M‘Neile, H., To the Members of the Liverpool Town Council. An address Relative to the Books of Instruction Used in the Corporation Schools, (Liverpool), 1836.
- McNeile, H., Speech of the Rev. Hugh M‘Neile of Liverpool, at the Public Meeting of the Glasgow Educational Society, Held on Wednesday, October 12, 1836, William Collins, (Glasgow), 1836.
- M‘Neile, H., Church Establishment: The Speech and Sermon Delivered in Defence of the Established Church: the Speech at the Second Annual Meeting of the Protestant Association, at Exeter Hall, May 10, and the Sermon at Percy Chapel, May 14, The Protestant Association, (London), 1837.
- M‘Neile, H., Speech of the Rev. Hugh M‘Neile, at the Church of England School (Society) meeting held in the Amphitheatre, Liverpool, on Tuesday, the 11th July, 1837, J. Davenport, (Liverpool), 1837.
- M‘Neile, H., Letters on National Education, Addressed to the Town Council of Liverpool. To which are added a Correspondence Hitherto Unpublished with Two Members of the Council, Hamilton, Adams, (London), 1837.
- M‘Neile, H., An Address Delivered to above Four Hundred of the Irish clergy (after an early breakfast together), at the Rotunda in Dublin, on Friday morning, April 27, 1838, before the Annual Meeting of the Hibernian Auxiliary Church Missionary Society, by the Rev. Hugh M‘Neile, W. Curry Junior and Company, (Dublin), 1838.
- M‘Neile, H., Anti-Slavery and Anti-Popery: A Letter Addressed to Edward Cropper, Esquire, and Thomas Berry Horsfall, Esquire, Hatchard and Son, (London), 1838.
- M‘Neile, H., Danger Cannot Teach: Now is the Time!: a Sermon Preached at the Parish Church of St. Nicholas, Liverpool, on Tuesday the 3rd of July, 1838, on behalf of the Liverpool Mariners’ Church Society, Henry Perris, (Liverpool), 1838.
- M‘Neile, H., "The Proper Deity of our Lord the Only Ground of Consistency in the Work of Redemption: A Lecture, Delivered in Christ Church, Hunter Street, Liverpool, on Wednesday Evening, March 13, 1839, by the Rev, Hugh M‘Neile, M.A., Incumbent of St. Jude’s, Liverpool", pp. 292–361 in Old, F. et al., Unitarianism Confuted; A Series of Lectures Delivered in Christ Church, Liverpool, by Thirteen Clergymen of the Church of England, Henry Perry, (London), 1839.
- M‘Neile, H., Nationalism in Religion: A Speech Delivered at the Annual Meeting of the Protestant Association, held in the Exeter Hall, on Wednesday, May 8, 1839, by the Rev. Hugh M‘Neile, M.A., England Protestant Association (London), 1839.
- M‘Neile, H., Lectures on the Church of England: Delivered in London, March, 1840 (Fourth Edition), J. Hatchard and Son, (London), 1840.
- M‘Neile, H., Prospects of the Jews: Or, a Series of Popular Lectures on the Prophecies Relative to the Jewish Nation; From the Second London Edition; With a Preface and Notes not in the Former Edition, Orrin Rogers, (Philadelphia), 1840.
- M‘Neile, H., Jezebel: Speech of the Rev. Hugh M‘Neile, at Market Drayton, Salop, December 19, 1839, The Protestant Association, (London), 1840.
- M‘Neile, H., "Antichrist: A Sermon Preached at St. Michael’s Church, Liverpool, on 15th February, 1839," pp. 281–347 in Cuninghame, W., The Church of Rome the Apostasy, and the Pope the Man of Sin and Son of Perdition. With an Appendix. To which is added, Antichrist, a Sermon by Rev. Hugh McNeile, A.M., Presbyterian Board of Publication, (Philadelphia), 1841.
- M‘Neile, H., A Letter to the Rev. Thos. Butler, D.D. a Priest of the Roman Schism in England, by the Rev. Hugh M‘Neile, M.A. incumbent of St. Jude’s Church, Liverpool, Lace and Addison, (Liverpool), 1841.
- M‘Neile, H., A Lecture on the Life of Dr. Franklin, by the Rev. Hugh M‘Neile, A.M., as Delivered by him at the Liverpool Royal Amphitheatre on Wednesday evening, 17th Nov. 1841, with the addition of a Prefatory Note to the Reader, by John B. Murray, Esq. of New York, Mitchell, Heaton, and Mitchell, (Liverpool), 1841.
- M‘Neile, H., "Satanic Agency and Mesmerism; A Sermon Preached at St Jude's Church, Liverpool, by the Rev. Hugh M‘Neile, M.A., on the Evening of Sunday, April 10, 1842", The Penny Pulpit: A Collection of Accurately-Reported Sermons by the Most Eminent Ministers of Various Denominations, Nos.599-600, (1842), pp. 141–152 [A summary of the sermon, including direct extracts, is at pp. 53–56 in The Silent Preacher for June 1842, James Paul, (London), 1842].
- M‘Neile, H., Lectures on the Sympathies, Sufferings, and Resurrection of the Lord Jesus Christ; Delivered in St. Jude's Church, Liverpool, During Passion-Week, and on Easter-Day (Second Edition), John Hatchard and Son, (London), 1843.
- M‘Neile, H., Church Extension and Church Unity: The Opening and Consecration Sermons Preached in St. Silas’ Church, Liverpool, by the Rev. Hugh M‘Neile, A.M., Minister of St. Jude’s, John Hatchard and Son, (London), 1843.
- McNeile, H., The Papal Antichrist: The Church of Rome Proved to Have the Marks of Antichrist: Being the Substance of a Speech Delivered at the Anniversary Meeting of the Manchester Protestant Association, at the Corn-Exchange ... March 7, 1843, The Protestant Association, (London), 1843.
- M‘Neile, H., God's Mode of Treating Evil: a Sermon, Preached on Sunday evening, February 18, 1844, by the Rev. Hugh M‘Neile, at Trinity Church, Sloane Street, Chelsea, James Paul, (London), 1844.
- M‘Neile, H., The Young Ruler and his Great Possessions: a Sermon, Preached on Sunday morning, February 18, 1844, by the Rev. Hugh M'Neile at Trinity Church, Sloane Street, Chelsea, James Paul, (London), 1844.
- M‘Neile, H., Speech of the Rev. Hugh M‘Neile, at the Great Meeting in Exeter Hall, 10th May, 1844, Myles Macphail, (Edinburgh), 1844.
- M‘Neile, H., Speech of the Rev. Hugh M‘Neile at a public meeting held in Liverpool, on Monday the 7th of April, 1845, against the proposed national endowment of Romanism, Seeley, Burnside and Seeley, (London), 1845.
- M‘Neile, H., Proposed National Grant to the Roman Catholic College at Maynooth… Speech of the Rev. M‘Neile ... at a Meeting of the Liverpool Protestant Operative Association, held at the Music Hall, on Monday, April 14, 1845, The Protestant Association, (London), 1845.
- M‘Neile, H., "Mr. M‘Neile and Messrs. Roebuck and Ward (Letter to the Editor)", The Times, No.18910, (Tuesday, 29 April 1845), p. 7, col.C.
- M‘Neile, H., A Sermon Preached at St. Bride's Church, Fleet Street, on Monday Evening, May 5, 1845, before the Church Missionary Society, Church Missionary Society, (London), 1845.
- M‘Neile, H., "To His Grace the Duke of Wellington (Letter to the Editor)", The Times, No.18939, (Monday, 2 June 1845), p. 6, col.E.
- M‘Neile, H., The State of the World, and God's Gift to it at the Advent of Christ: a Sermon, Preached on Christmas morning, December 25, 1845, by the Rev. H. M‘Neile at St. Jude's, Liverpool, James Paul, (London), 1845.
- M‘Neile, H., The Manifested Oneness of the Church of Christ: with Some Reasons for Not Joining the Proposed Evangelical Alliance: a Sermon Preached on Sunday Morning, December 14th, 1845 (Third Edition), J. Hatchard and Son, (London), 1846.
- M‘Neile, H., The Condition of the Old and Corrupt Church: a Sermon Preached on Wednesday, May 12, 1847, by the Rev. Hugh M'Neile at St. John's Chapel, Bedford Row, on Behalf of the British Reformation Society, James Paul, (London), 1846.
- M‘Neile, H., The Church and the Churches, or, The Church of God in Christ and the Churches of Christ Militant Here on Earth, J. Hatchard and Son, (London), 1846.
- McNeile, H., Victory over Death: a Sermon Preached in St. Augustine's Church, Everton, on the Sunday next after the Interment of the Late Beloved and Venerated Minister of that Church, the Rev. Thomas Tattershall: who "died in the Lord" on Thursday the 29th of October, 1846, by Hugh McNeile, Hatchard, (London), 1846.
- M‘Neile, H., "Every Eye Shall See Him"; or Prince AIbert's Visit to Liverpool used in Illustration of the Second Coming of Christ. A Sermon, preached in Saint Jude's Church, on the second day of August, 1846, the Sunday next after the Prince's visit (the Sunday After Prince Albert Laying the Foundation Stone of the Liverpool Sailor's Home). By the Rev. Hugh M‘Neile, M.A., Hon. Canon of Chester, and Incumbent of St. Jude's, Liverpool, J. Hatchard & Son, (London), 1846.
- M‘Neile, H., The State in Danger; a Letter to the Right Honorable Lord John Russell, M.P., First Lord of the Treasury, etc. etc. etc., by the Rev. Hugh M‘Neile, M.A., Hon. Canon of Chester, and incumbent of St. Jude’s Church, Liverpool, John Hatchard and Son, (London), 1846.
- M‘Neile, H., A Sermon Preached before the Church Pastoral-Aid Society, at its Anniversary, in the Church of the United Parishes of Christ Church, Newgate-Street, and St. Leonard’s, Foster-Lane, on Monday, May 10, 1847, by the Rev. Hugh M‘Neile, Church Pastoral-Aid Society, (London), 1847.
- M‘Neile, H., British Information Society; Anniversary Sermon Preached at St. John's Chapel, Bedford Row, Wednesday Evening, May 12th, 1847, by Hugh M‘Neile, G. Norman, (London), 1847.
- M‘Neile, H., The House of God: A Sermon (on Genesis 28:19), Preached at the Opening of St. Paul's Church, Prince's Park, Liverpool, on Sunday, the 12th of March, 1848, John Hatchard and Son (London), 1848.
- McNeile, H., Slave Labor Versus Free Labor Sugar. Speech of the Revd. Dr. McNeile, Delivered at a Public Meeting Held at Liverpool, 13th. June, 1848, F. Syrett, (London), 1848.
- M‘Neile, H., National Sin, What is It? A Letter to the Right Honorable Sir George Grey, by the Rev. Hugh M‘Neile (Third Edition), J. Hatchard and Son, (London), 1849.
- M‘Neile, H., The Covenants Distinguished: a Sermon on the Restoration of the Jews, Preached in the Parish Church of St. George’s, Bloomsbury, on Thursday, the 22d of November, 1849, and Published by Request by the Rev. Hugh M‘Neile, Hatchard & Co., (London), 1849.
- M‘Neile, H., The Bible: its Provision and Adaptation for the Moral Necessities of Fallen Man: a Lecture by the Rev. Hugh McNeile, D.D., Delivered before the Young Men’s Christian Association, in Exeter Hall, January 8, 1850, James Nisbet and Co, (London), 1850.
- Two Sermons Preached in the Parish Church of Watton, March 10, 1850, the Sunday After the Funeral of the Rev. E. Bickersteth, by the Rev. Edward Auriol, M.A. and the Rev. H. M‘Neile, D.D., Seeleys (London), 1850.
- M‘Neile, H., A Sermon (on John xvi.7-11) Preached in Behalf of the Society for Irish Church Missions (to the Roman Catholics), (London), 1850.
- M‘Neile, H., Speech of the Rev. Dr. M‘Neile, at a meeting in Oxford, on behalf of the Society for Irish Church Missions to the Roman Catholics, S. Mills, (London), 1850.
- M‘Neile, H., Canon Law: A Lecture, on the Canon Law of the Papacy, Delivered in the Amphitheatre, Liverpool, on Tuesday, December 10, 1850, by the Rev. Hugh M‘Neile, D.D., Incumbent of St. Paul's, Prince's Park, and Hon. Canon of Chester: Authorised Edition; Revised and Corrected by the Speakers, Thomas Hatchard, (London), 1850.
- M‘Neile, H., The Rev. Dr. M'Neile's Speech on the Papal Aggression: Delivered at Exeter Hall, on Tuesday, December 17th, 1850, C. Westerton, (London), 1850.
- M‘Neile, H., "Dr. M‘Neile and the Confessional (Letter to the Editor)", The Times, No.20676, (Thursday, 19 December 1850), p. 2, col.E.
- M‘Neile, H., "Dr. M‘Neile and Dr. Wiseman (Letter to the Editor)", The Times, No.20689, (Friday, 3 January 1851), p. 7, col.B.
- M‘Neile, H., "Baptism Doth Save": A Letter to the Right Rev. the Lord Bishop of Exeter by the Rev. Hugh M‘Neile, D.D., Thomas Hatchard, (London), 1851.
- M‘Neile, H., Intolerance and Toleration: A Sermon. The Annual Sermon of the Protestant Association, Revised by the Author, The Protestant Association, (London), 1852.
- M‘Neile, H., The Jews and Judaism: a Lecture by the Rev. Hugh M'Neile, D.D., St.Paul's, Liverpool, Delivered Before the Young Men's Christian Association, in Exeter Hall, February 14, 1854, James Nisbet, (London), 1854.
- McNeile, H., "The Famine a Rod of God; Its Provoking Cause — Its Merciful Design (A Sermon (on Micah 6:9) Preached in St. Jude’s Church, Liverpool, on Sunday 28th of February, 1847, during the Irish Famine)", pp.67-100 in Anon, Sermons by Eminent Living Divines of the Church of England, Contributed by the Authors, With an Introductory Charge on Preaching, by the Venerable Archdeacon Sinclair, Richard Griffin and Company, (London), 1856.
- M‘Neile, H., The Sabbath Defended (An Address Delivered by the Rev. Dr. M'Neile of Liverpool to the Church of Ireland Young Men's Society), George Phillips & Sons, (Belfast), 1856.
- M‘Neile, H., "Who, then, can be saved?", pp. 103–119 in Mackenzie, W.B. (ed), Twelve Sermons Preached at the Special Services for the Working Classes, in Exeter Hall, May, June, July, August, 1857, Seeley, Jackson, & Halliday, (London), 1857.
- M‘Neile, H., "Address by the Rev. Dr. McNeile", pp. 1–15 in Bridges, C. (ed), The Church; Its Duties, Claims, Perils and Privileges, the Substance of the Addresses and Sermons Delivered at the Fifth Combined Clerical Meeting at Weston-Super-Mare, J. Whereat, (Weston-Super-Mare), 1858.
- M‘Neile, H., The Ruins and the Remedy: a Sermon Preached in St. Paul's Church, Prince's Park, Liverpool, on Sunday, October 10th, 1858, the day before the Liverpool Meetings of the National Association for the Promotion of Social Science, T. Hatchard, (London), 1858.
- McNeile, H., The English Reformation, a Re-assertion of Primitive Christianity: A Sermon Preached in Christ Church, Newgate Street, on the 17th of November, 1858, the Tercentenary Commemoration of the Accession of Queen Elizabeth, Adam Holden, (Liverpool), 1858.
- McNeile, H., The Great Supper: a Sermon Delivered on the Second Sunday after Epiphany, January 16, 1859, by the Rev. Hugh M'Neile, in the Cathedral Church of St. Paul, London, James Paul, (London), 1859.
- M‘Neile, H., Godly Sorrow Contrasted with Worldly Sorrow: a Sermon, Preached by the Rev. Hugh M‘Neile, D.D., in St. Luke’s Church, Liverpool, on Wednesday evening, the 16th of March, 1859, Being one of a Series of Sermons Delivered in that Church by Different Clergymen during Lent, 1859, Benson & Mallett, (Liverpool), 1859.
- M‘Neile, H. [1859c], The Purse, the Scrip, and the Sword: a Sermon (on Luke 22:36), Preached at the Visitation held by the Rt. Rev. The Lord Bishop of Chester, on Monday, the 24th of October, 1859, in St. Luke’s Church, Liverpool, by the Rev. Hugh M‘Neile, Hatchard, (London), 1859.
- M‘Neile, H., The Astronomer and the Christian. A sermon (on Psalm 8:3,4) "in memoriam Jeremiæ Horroccii", Preached in the Parish Church of Preston on Wednesday, November 9, 1859, by the Rev. Hugh M‘Neile Hon. Canon of Chester, and Incumbent of St. Jude’s Church, Liverpool, published by request, Hatchard, (London), 1859.,
- McNeile, H., The Historical Veracity of the Pentateuch, Inseparable from the Divine Inspiration of the New Testament: a Sermon Preached (on Isaiah 43:10) on February 22nd, 1863, in the Cathedral Church of St. Paul's, London, James Nisbet, (London), 1863.
- Cairns, H.MacC., Birks, T.R. & McNeile, H., Addresses delivered by Sir Hugh Cairns, M.P., Rev. T.R. Birks, and the Rev. Canon Hugh McNeile, D.D. on the identity in the interests of the two branches of the United Church of England and Ireland, that church's present danger, her duty and safeguard in the impending crisis, at the Irish Church Mission’s Anniversary Breakfast, 1864, Hatchard and Co, (London), 1864.
- McNeile, H., The Adoption, and other Sermons, preached in the Cathedral Church of Chester, by the Rev. Hugh M‘Neile, D.D., Nisbet and Company, (London), 1864.
- M‘Neile, H., "The Characteristics of Romanism and of Protestantism as Developed in their Respective Teaching and Worship; by the Rev. Hugh M‘Neile, D.D.", pp. 1–33 in Shipton, W.E. (ed), Lectures Delivered Before the Young Men's Christian Association, Volume IV (1848-1849), James Nisbet & Co., 1864.
- M‘Neile, H., Sermons on the Second Advent of the Lord Jesus Christ (New Edition), Edward Howell, (Liverpool), 1865.
- McNeile, H., Victory over Death: A Sermon (on 1 Thessalonians 4:16-18) Preached in Christ Church, Salford, on the Sunday after the Internment of the Late Beloved and Venerated Minister of that Church, The Rev. Hugh Stowell, who died on Sunday the 8th of October, 1865, Hatchard and Company, (London), 1865.
- M‘Neile, H., Fidelity and Unity: a Letter to the Reverend E.B. Pusey, D.D., Regius Professor of Hebrew, and Canon of Christ Church, Oxford, by the Reverend Hugh M‘Neile, D.D., Canon Residentiary of Chester and Incumbent of St. Paul’s, Prince’s Park, Liverpool, Hatchard & Co., (London), 1866.
- M‘Neile, H., Confession without Amendment; or, Dissembling with God. A sermon (on Psalm 78:36) Suggested by the Special Prayer against the Cattle Plague and Cholera, Preached in Chester Cathedral, and Published by Request by the Rev. Hugh M‘Neile, Hatchard & Co., (London), 1866.
- M‘Neile, H., The Certainty of Saving Truth: a sermon (on 2 Timothy 3:14,15) Preached in the Cathedral Church of Chester at an Ordination held by the Lord Bishop of the Diocese, on Sunday, the 16th of June, 1867, by the Rev. Hugh M‘Neile, Hatchard and Co., London, 1867.
- M‘Neile, H., The Church and the Churches, or, The Church of God in Christ and the Churches of Christ Militant Here on Earth, by the Rev. Hugh M‘Neile, D.D., Canon of Chester; New Edition, Revised, in Two Volumes, Hatchard and Company, (London), 1867.
- M‘Neile, H., Deliverance to the Captives: a Sermon Preached on Wednesday afternoon, March 18, 1868, in the Church of St. Clement Danes, Strand, by the Rev. Hugh M‘Neile, James Paul, (London), 1868.
- M‘Neile, H., "The Canon Law", The Times, No.26196, (Thursday, 6 August 1868), p. 7, col.F.
- M‘Neile, H., "The Canon Law", The Times, No.26201, (Wednesday, 12 August 1868), p. 8, col.B.
- McNeile, H., Shew Thyself to the Priest: A Sermon [on Matthew 8:4], by the very Rev. Hugh McNeile, D.D., James Nisbet and Co., (London), 1872
- M‘Neile, H., "The Athanasian Creed", The Times, No.27600, (Thursday, 30 January 1873), p. 5, col.E.
- M‘Neile, H., Letters on the Athanasian Creed; Reprinted from The Times Newspaper of the 30th January and 5 February 1873, with Notes, James Nisbet and Company, (London), 1873.
- M‘Neile, H., Scriptural Proportions: Illustrated by the Place which the Lord’s Supper occupies in the New Testament, by the Very Rev. Hugh M‘Neile, D.D., Dean of Ripon, William Macintosh, (London), 1873.
- M‘Neile, H., Preach the Word: an Ordination Sermon (on Timothy 4:2) Delivered Sept. 21, 1873, (London), 1873.
- M‘Neile, H., "Confession in the Church of England (Letter to the Editor)", The Times, No.27966, (Thursday, 2 April 1874), p. 4, col.F.
  - Reprinted at: The Sydney Morning Herald, (Thursday, 11 June 1874), p.6.
