= John Toshimichi Imai =

Japanese Anglican priest

The Reverend John Toshimichi Imai
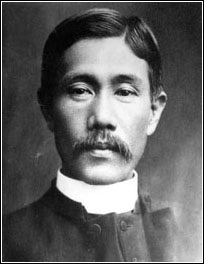
- John Toshimichi Imai

Personal details
- Born: November 12, 1863 Tokyo, Japan
- Died: 3 September 1919 (aged 55) Tokyo, Japan

The Reverend John Toshimichi Imai (12 November 1863 – 3 September 1919, 今井 寿道) was the first Japanese-born ordained priest in the Nippon Sei Ko Kai, the Anglican Church in Japan.

A close associate of the Rev. Alexander Croft Shaw, he served as priest in charge of the Japanese congregation at St. Andrew's Church, Tokyo from 1894.

== Early life and education ==
Imai was born in Tokyo, Japan, on November 12, 1863. A graduate of Keio University, he was ordained priest by Bishop Edward Bickersteth in 1889. Through his affiliation with the SPG, Imai was able to spend a year studying in the United Kingdom (1892–1893), including mission focused study at Pusey House, Oxford, All Hallows-by-the-Tower, London, and in Cambridge.

== Career ==
During his work as priest in the Diocese of South Tokyo, Imai was noted for both his practical approach to Christian mission work and for his writing on personal ethics. Responding to the popularity in Europe and North America for the writing of Nitobe Inazō, Imai published a critical short essay on the subject of Bushido in 1906; Bushido: In the Past and in The Present.

Together with Sir Ernest Satow, Imai represented the Diocese of South Tokyo at the Pan-Anglican Congress held in London in 1908.

Imai was appointed Principal of St. Hilda's School for Girls and was the first President of the Central Theological College, Tokyo established in 1908.

== See also ==
- Anglican Church in Japan
- St. Andrew's Cathedral, Tokyo
