= Agatha Harrison =

- Born: 1885; Sandhurst, United Kingdom
- Died: October 5, 1954 (aged 68–69); Geneva, Switzerland

Agatha Mary Harrison (1885–1954) was an English industrial welfare reformer and unofficial diplomat.

== Life ==
Harrison was born January 23, 1885, in Sandhurst, Berkshire to a Methodist minister and his wife. She did not attend university but she gained some education as a pupil teacher. She joined Boots the Chemist and then the Metal Box Company where she was an advocate for women's rights. Despite her lack of academic qualification she was appointed to the first Industrial Relations academic post at the London School of Economics in 1917. Three years later the Young Women's Christian Association sent her to investigate industrial conditions in China. She found child labour and she managed the difficult task of persuading employers to stop this exploitation. In the 1920s she went to America to continue her work with the YWCA. She returned to the UK in 1928 to work for the Women's International League for Peace and Freedom. She served as an assistant to Beryl Power who was working for the Whitley Commission looking at labour conditions.

She met Gandhi and agreed to help him with the cause of India's independence. She spent long periods in India working so closely with Gandhi that she was a go-between during his hunger strike in 1939. After the war she returned to help with negotiations. She and Charles Freer Andrews arranged for Gandhi to visit the UK.

== Death and legacy ==
Harrison died in Geneva in 1954 at a peace conference held to discuss the French Indochina War and she was buried locally. The Indian government founded a scholarship in Harrison's name at St Antony's College, Oxford.
