= Foreign Aid Society =

Foreign Aid Society, 1840, UK

The Foreign Aid Society for the Diffusion of the Gospel on the Continent was formed in 1840 by the amalgamation of the Anglican Central Committee (founded in 1832) and the Continental society (founded in 1819, renamed the European Missionary Society circa 1836). The key figure instrumental in bringing about the merger was Edward Bickersteth, a member of both former organisations.

The aim of the societies was the promotion of the cause of the gospel on the continent of Europe.

While the Continental Society appointed and funded its own workers, the Central Committee worked through local agencies, providing moral and financial support, but leaving the selection of workers and other such matters in the hands of locals.

The object of the amalgamated society was stated as follows:

To collect funds in aid of the Evangelical Societies of France and Geneva, and such other institutions as may be formed on similar principles, within the limits of the French Protestant Churches, and generally to promote the religious principles of the Reformation beyond those limits, on the Continent and the Islands of Europe.

The Central Committee also worked within a Church of England (Anglican) framework, unlike the interdenominational Continental society, which had become embroiled in controversies over eschatology and church practice.

The Foreign Aid Society continued its work until the eve of the First World War. Its annual reports and its magazines, The Gospel on the Continent and the Watchfire, are available in the British and Bodleian libraries.
