= Bishop of South Tokyo =

Historic title

The Bishop of South Tokyo was a historic title of a bishop in the Nippon Sei Ko Kai, or Anglican Church in Japan.

Edward Bickersteth (1850–1897) was the first Bishop of South Tokyo, from 1886 until his premature death in 1897. He was born at Banningham, Norfolk, into a noted ecclesiastical family; his father was Bishop of Exeter from 1885 to 1900.

The title of Bishop of South Tokyo was suspended in 1947 after the reorganization of the Nippon Sei Ko Kai into eleven dioceses.

== See also ==
- St. Andrew's Cathedral, Tokyo
