= Peace, Perfect Peace (hymn) =

- Genre: Hymn
- Written: 1875
- Text: by Edward H. Bickersteth
- Based on: Isaiah 26:3
- Meter: 10.10
- Published: Songs in the House of Pilgrimage (Hampstead, by J. Hewetson, in 1875 or 1876)

Peace, Perfect Peace is a hymn whose lyrics were written in August 1875 by Edward H. Bickersteth at the bedside of a dying relative. He read it to his relative immediately after writing it, to his children at tea time that day, and soon published it along with four other hymns he had written in a tract called Songs in the House of Pilgrimage. Of the dozens of hymns he wrote, this one became the most popular. A century later, it was still a popular choice for Christian funerals.

George Thomas Caldbeck (1852–1918) later wrote the tune, which is usually called Pax Tecum. Caldbeck's tune was substantially altered by a hymnal editor, Charles Vincent.

Each short stanza begins one line asking a simple question about whether peace is possible under a difficult circumstance. The second line answers the question. The opening phrase of "Peace, perfect peace" is based upon Isaiah 26, verse 3, "Thou wilt keep him in perfect peace whose mind is stayed on Thee". "Perfect peace" is a translation from an epizeuxis of the word for peace the original Hebrew, which adds emphasis.

== Lyrics ==
Peace, perfect peace, in this dark world of sin?
The blood of Jesus whispers peace within.

Peace, perfect peace, by thronging duties pressed?
To do the will of Jesus, this is rest.

Peace, perfect peace, with sorrows surging round?
On Jesus' bosom nought but calm is found.

Peace, perfect peace, with loved ones far away?
In Jesus' keeping we are safe and they.

Peace, perfect peace, our future all unknown?
Jesus we know, and he is on the throne.

Peace, perfect peace, death shadowing us and ours?
Jesus has vanquished death and all its powers.

It is enough: earth's struggles soon shall cease,
and Jesus call to heaven's perfect peace.
