= Joseph John (minister) =

Indian Christian minister

- Born: 1906
- Died: 1998 (aged 91–92)

Joseph John (1906–1998) was a minister of the Church of South India and founder of the Deenabanduparum Rural Life Center, a model village and organization to support the poor, in India's former Madras State.

== Biography ==
John was ordained in 1934 and worked as a pastor in the Serkadu area of Katpadi in Vellore District, Tamil Nadu. He reportedly met Mahatma Gandhi, who encouraged him to start an organization to help the poor in memory of C. F. Andrews, who was known as "Friend of the Poor," or Deenabandhu. John left the ministry in 1948 to serve poor and casteless people in the remote Madras State. He acquired 500 hectares (1,200 acres) of seemingly uncultivable land in the Palasamudram mandal in the Chittoor District of Andhra Pradesh. He named it Deenabandupuram (Place of the Friend of the Poor). The organization World Neighbours supported his work starting in 1955.

Landless people were given plots of land at the Deenabanduparum Rural Life Center and granted a revolving loan fund to get them started. John's son Karuna directed the center's agricultural extension program, which showed locals how to use irrigation and fertilizers to improve farming. World Neighbors helped train villagers in skills such as carpentry, metalwork, and printing. His other son, physician Prem Chandran, introduced low-cost medical care and a family planning program with his wife Hari. The clinic had 25 beds and some mobile units by 1974. The John family also established a comprehensive community health project emphasizing sanitation, nutrition, and increased food production, and created the Nava Jeevan (New Life) project to bring lepers back into society. Rotary International did a public health survey of the area to help measure need. An elementary school was also established. John worked with the Tamilnadu Christian Council on an irrigation agricultural project for small farmers in Tamilnadu. Lüder Lüers and Bread for the World also provided support.

John's missionary work strived to relate Christianity to Indian culture and drew inspiration from Indigenous architectural style for building new churches. A notable feature of his style is baptismal font in the form of a lotus flower, with a cross planted in its midst. His churches were designed as pillared temple halls built from stone, with carved motifs. These motifs often combined Hindu and Christian symbols or Hindu and Muslim architecture. In addition to commissioning churches, John began a number of local festivals.

A film called Village of the Poor was released in 1954 by Alan Shilin Productions.

== Personal life ==
John moved to Deenabandupuram with his first wife, Ranjitham (Satya family), who graduated from the Union Missionary Medical School in Vellore. John had three children with Ranjitham. Two of John's children- Prem Chandran and Hannah graduated from the Christian Medical College Vellore. Karuna graduated with a degree in agriculture from a school in California, United States. Additionally, Prem Chandran received an MS in Public Health from Johns Hopkins University in Baltimore, Maryland, USA. He specialized in leprosy. John’s daughter Hannah is a doctor, who has worked as a missionary across several countries.

Upon the death of his first wife, John married Padma Satya- a notable graduate from the Hope College, Chicago- who ably continued the journey of empowerment and education. John and Padma had three daughters- Gitanjali, a social work graduate from King's College London; Premila, a special education expert specialising in empowerment of children with special needs and training of special educators; and Barathi a social work graduate who specialised in marginalised communities.

Like Gandhi, John always wore clothes made from khadi.
