= Thomas Rawson Birks =

English theologian and controversialist

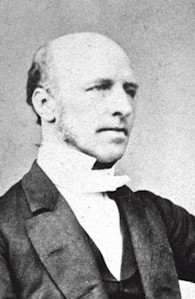
- Born: 28 September 1810; Staveley, Derbyshire
- Died: 19 July 1883 (aged 72); Cambridge
- Education: Trinity College, Cambridge
- Occupations: theologian and controversialist
- Spouse: two
- Children: eight
- Parent(s): Thomas and Sarah (nee Fletcher)

Thomas Rawson Birks (28 September 1810 – 19 July 1883) was an English theologian and controversialist, who figured in the debate to try to resolve theology and science. He rose to be Knightbridge Professor of Moral Philosophy at the University of Cambridge. His discussions led to much controversy: in one book he proposed that stars cannot have planets as this would reduce the importance of Christ's appearance on this planet.

== Biography ==
Birks was born on 28 September 1810 in Staveley in Derbyshire, England, where his father was a tenant farmer under the Duke of Devonshire. The family being nonconformists, Birks was educated at Chesterfield and then at the Dissenting College at Mill Hill. He won a sizarship and a scholarship at Trinity College, Cambridge, and in his third year gained the chief English declamation prize. As the holder of this prize he delivered the customary oration in the college hall. The subject chosen was Mathematical and Moral Certainty and Dr William Whewell spoke very highly of this oration. In 1834, like Whewell before him, Birks became second wrangler and second Smith's prizeman.

== The church ==
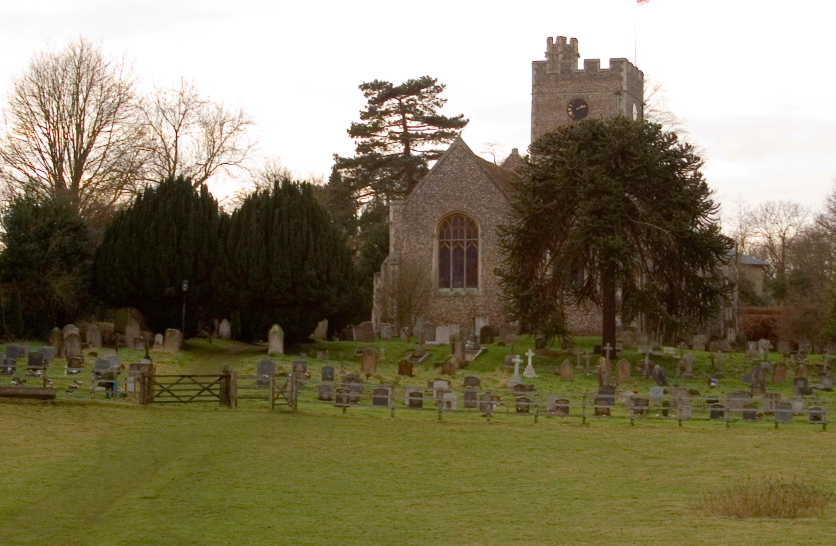
Watton-at-Stone church, where Birks worked with Edward Bickersteth

Having joined the Church of England on leaving the university, Birks settled at Watton-at-Stone as tutor and then curate to the Reverend Edward Bickersteth. During his stay there he studied the prophetic scriptures, and took the affirmative side in the warm controversy which arose on the subject of the premillennial theory of the Lord's return. In 1843-4 Birks won the Seatonian prize for the best English poem at Trinity College. Some years before he had been elected a fellow of this college. He engaged in many religious controversies, and one of these, on the future of the Lost, led to the severance of private friendships and religious connections. In his views on this subject he was equally opposed to the universalists and the annihilationists. In 1844 Birks married Bickersteth's daughter, Elizabeth, and accepted the living of Kelshall in Hertfordshire.

Birks published Modern Astronomy in 1830 to demonstrate a harmony between science and religion; in it he attempts to join theology and a modern understanding of astronomy. He deals with such subjects as the insignificance of man, if we are but one race alone in the universe except for the angels. How can Christ's importance be squared with the unimportance of the human race in a large universe with a multitude of stars and planets? Birks' solution was to decide that the existence of planets around other stars is only conjecture.

In 1850 he published his edition of William Paley's Horae Paulinae, or the Truth of the Scripture History of St Paul with notes and a supplementary treatise entitled Horae Apostolicae.

== Widower ==
In 1856 Birks' wife, Elizabeth, died at the age of 46. His widowhood led to the suspension of his writing for several years. Nevertheless, The Bible and Modern Thought was published in 1861 at the request of the committee of the Religious Tract Society. Birks subsequently enlarged his work by a series of notes on the evidential school of theology, the limits of religious thought, the Bible and ancient Egypt, the human element in Scripture, and Genesis and geology. In 1862 he published On Matter and Ether, Or, The Secret Laws of Physical Change which dealt with issues of physics.

== Cambridge and second marriage ==
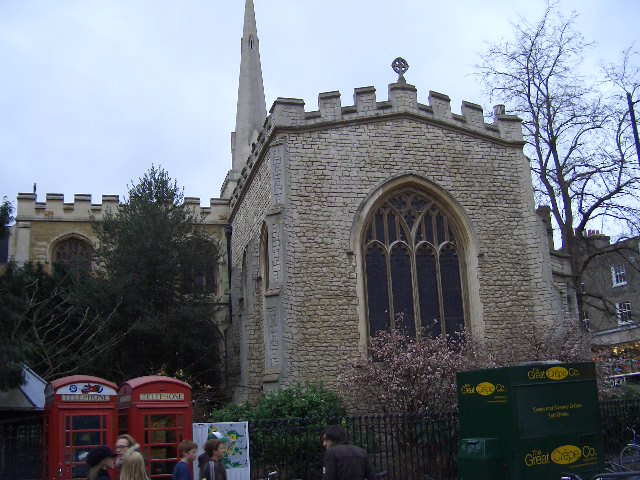
Holy Trinity Church, Cambridge (in 2004) where Birks served as vicar from 1866 to 1877

Birks left Kelshall in 1864. In 1866 he accepted the important charge of Holy Trinity Church, Cambridge; and on 17 May 1866 married his second wife, Georgina Agnes Beresford, widow of Major James Douglas.

At the time of the disestablishment of the Church of Ireland, Birks came forward with a lengthy treatise on Church and State which was an elaboration of a treatise written thirty years before, and was now republished as bearing upon the ecclesiastical change proposed by William Ewart Gladstone and carried into effect by Parliament. Birks was installed honorary canon of Ely Cathedral in 1871, and in 1872, on the death of the Rev. F. D. Maurice, he was elected Knightbridge Professor of Philosophy. This appointment led to a stormy controversy. It was regarded as a retrograde step by the large body of liberal thinkers who sympathised with the views of Maurice. As pastor at Cambridge, Birks gave religious instruction to the undergraduates, to older members of the university, and also to the residents in the town. In the year of his appointment he published his Scripture Doctrine of Creation and The Philosophy of Human Responsibility. His inaugural lecture as professor of moral philosophy was on The Present Importance of Moral Science(1872).

In 1873 Birks published his First Principles of Moral Science which was a course of lectures delivered during his professorship. This work was followed in 1874 by Modern Utilitarianism in which the systems of William Paley, Jeremy Bentham and John Stuart Mill were examined and compared. In 1876 he delivered the annual address to the Victoria Institute, his subject being The Uncertainties of Modern Physical Science.

In 1876 he published his work on Modern Physical Fatalism and the Doctrine of Evolution. It contained the substance of a course of lectures devoted to the examination of the philosophy unfolded in Herbert Spencer's First Principles. Birks held the views expressed by Spencer to be unsound and opposed to the fundamental doctrines of Christianity and even the existence of moral science. To the strictures upon his First Principles Spencer replied at length, and this led to the re-publication, in 1882, of Birks's treatise, with an introduction by Charles Pritchard, Savilian professor of astronomy at Oxford, in which Spencer's rejoinder was dealt with, and the original arguments of Birks illustrated and further explained.

Birks resigned the vicarage of Trinity in 1877, and in the same year published a volume on Manuscript Evidence in the Text of the New Testament, which was an endeavour to bring "mathematical reasoning to bear on the probable value of the manuscripts of different ages, with a general inference in favour of the high value of the cursive manuscripts as a class". In the same year Birks issued his Supernatural Revelation, being an answer to a work on Supernatural Religion which had given rise to much criticism. Birks's treatise was again republished at a later period by Pritchard, with a reply to objections that had been urged against it.

== Other activities ==
For twenty-one years Birks served as honorary secretary to the Evangelical Alliance, but he resigned when the committee failed to agree with his views on eternal punishment. He was an examiner for the theological examination at Cambridge in 1867 and 1868, and was a member of the board of theological studies. He took an active part in all university affairs during his connection with Cambridge, was appointed to preach the Ramsden sermon in 1867, and was frequently a select preacher before the university.

== Illness and death ==
Early in 1875 Birks suffered from a paralytic seizure, and this was followed by a second stroke in 1877. He still took a deep interest in questions of the day, and was able to dictate various works.

In April 1880, while residing in the New Forest, he was paralysed for a week, his third attack. He was conveyed home to Cambridge, where he lingered for three years incapable of intellectual effort. He died on 19 July 1883 at his home and he was buried in Cambridge.

== Family ==
By his first marriage to Elizabeth Bickersteth, Birks had eight children. His eldest son, Edward Bickersteth Birks, also became a theologian and succeeded him as a fellow of Trinity.

== Works ==
In addition to the works named in the course of this article, Birks was the author of a considerable number of treatises on prophecy and other subjects connected with the older revelation, as well as his Memoir of the Rev. Edward Bickersteth.

- First Elements of Sacred Prophecy: Including an Examination of Several Recent Expositions, and of the Year-Day Theory (London: William Edward Painter, 1843).
- The Four Prophetic Empires and the Kingdom of the Messiah: Being an Exposition of the First Two Visions of Daniel (London: Seeley, Burnside and Seeley, 1844).
- Outlines of unfulfilled prophecy, an inquiry into the Scripture testimony respecting the 'good things to come'. (London: Seeleys, 1854).
- The Exodus of Israel: Its Difficulties Examined, and its Truth Confirmed with a Reply to Recent Objections (1863)
- The Victory of Divine Goodness: Reply to Strictures (on the Above-named Work) in Two Recent Works (i.e. “Religious Tendencies of the Times” by James Grant, and “God's Purpose in Judgments” by Robert Baxter). (London: Rivingtons, 1869).
- The Victory of Divine Goodness: Including I. Letters to an Inquirer on Various Doctrines of Scripture : II. Notes on Coleridge's Confessions of an Inquiring Spirit : III. Thoughts on the Nature of the Atonement and of Eternal Judgment (London: Rivingtons, 1870).
- Commentary on the Book of Isaiah: Critical, Historical, and Prophetical; Including a Revised English Translation, with Introduction and Appendices (London: McMillan & Co., 1878).
- Thoughts on the times and seasons of sacred prophecy (London: Hodder and Stoughton, 1880).
- Essay on the Right Estimation of Manuscript Evidence In the Text of the New Testament (1878)
