= Edward Bickersteth (bishop of Exeter) =

British bishop

The Right Reverend Edward Henry Bickersteth
- Bishop of Exeter
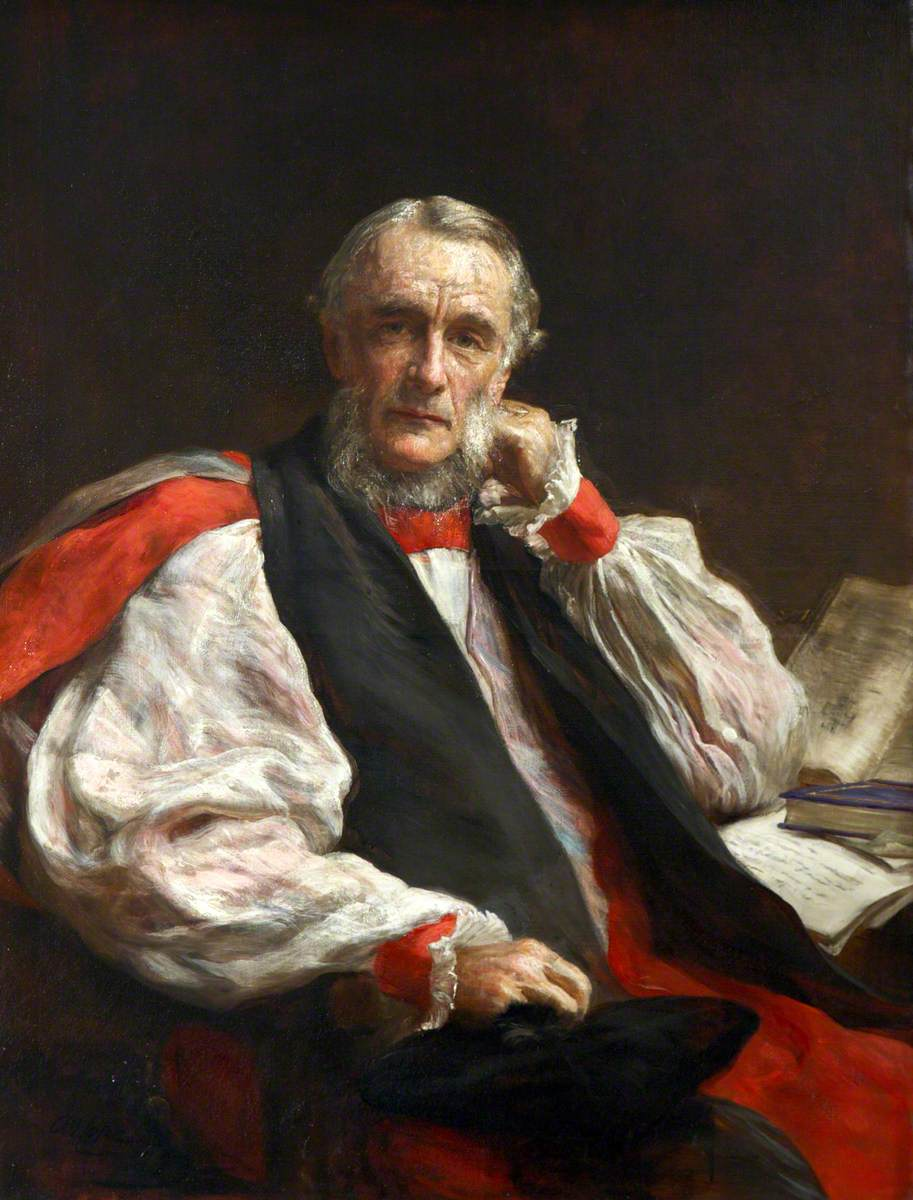
- Diocese: Diocese of Exeter
- In office: 1885–1900
- Predecessor: Frederick Temple
- Successor: Herbert Edward Ryle
- Other post: Dean of Gloucester (1885)

Orders
- Consecration: 25 April 1885 by Edward White Benson

Personal details
- Born: 25 January 1825 Islington, London, England
- Died: 16 May 1906 (aged 81) London, England
- Denomination: Anglican
- Spouse: (1) Rosa Bignold (2) Ellen Susanna Bickersteth
- Education: Trinity College, Cambridge

Edward Henry Bickersteth (25 January 1825 – 16 May 1906) was a bishop in the Church of England and he held the office of Bishop of Exeter between 1885 and 1900.

== Life ==
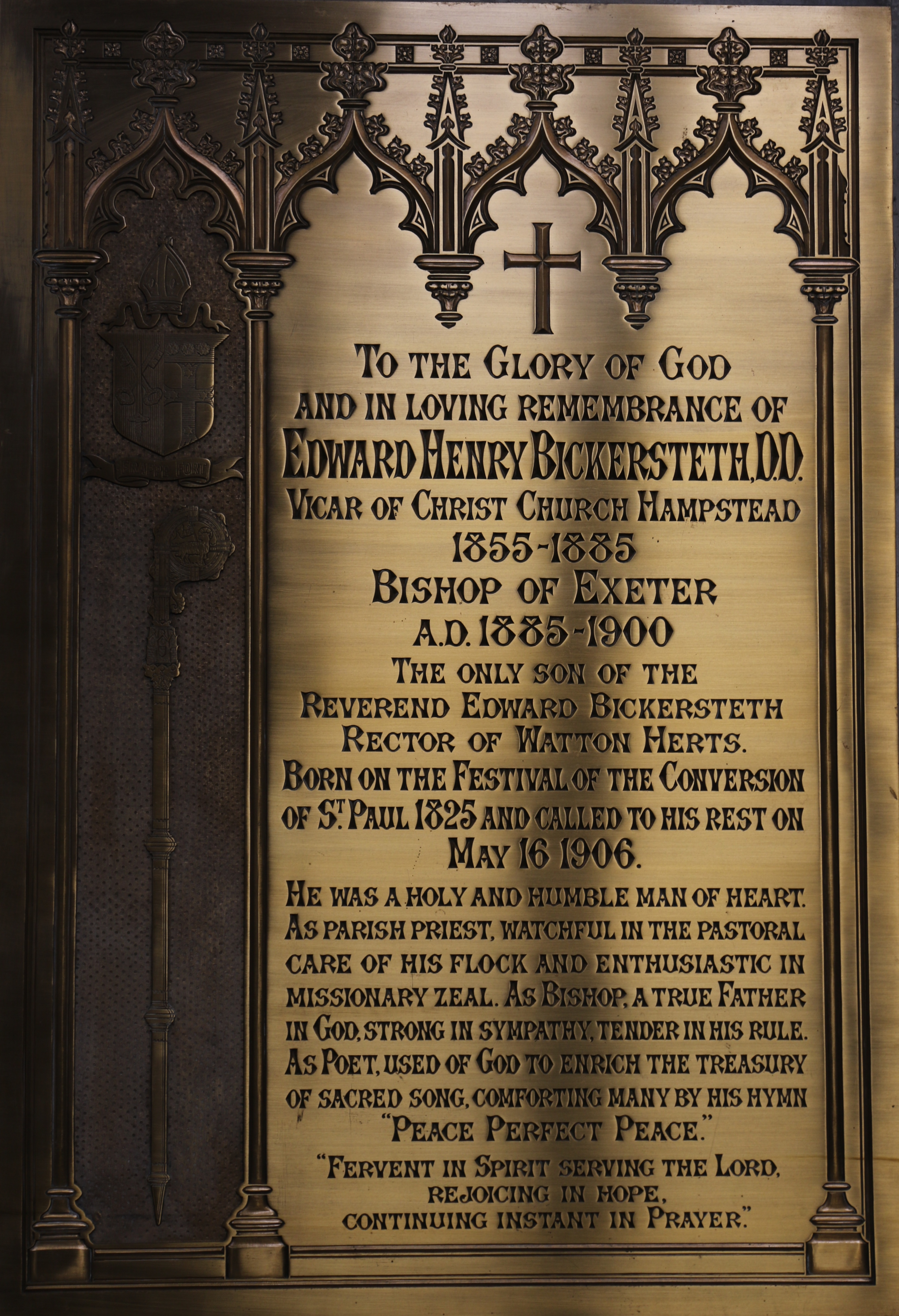
Memorial in Exeter Cathedral

Edward Henry Bickersteth was born in Islington, the son of Edward Bickersteth, Rector of Watton, Hertfordshire. He was educated at Trinity College, Cambridge, where he graduated B.A. in Classics 1847, and proceeded M.A. in 1850. and was awarded the Chancellor's Gold Medal for poetry in 1844, 1845 and 1846.

On taking holy orders (deacon, 1848, priest 1849), he became curate of Banningham, Norfolk, and then of Christ Church, Tunbridge Wells. He was called to the Rectory of Hinton Martell in 1852 and to the Vicarage of Christ Church, Hampstead in 1855, a position in which he remained for 30 years.

In 1885 he became Dean of Gloucester and in the same year was appointed Bishop of Exeter. Bickersteth was awarded an honorary D.D. by Cambridge University in 1885.

== Support for overseas mission work ==
Following in the footsteps of his father, Bickersteth undertook a number of extended overseas mission tours in support of the work of the Church Mission Society and the Society for the Propagation of the Gospel. In 1880 he travelled to India and the Middle East. 1891 he travelled to Japan on a visit to the mission churches of the Nippon Sei Ko Kai, reuniting with his eldest son Edward, then serving as the first Bishop of South Tokyo. Arriving in Yokohama on 23 September 1891, the travel journals of his daughter, Mary Jane Bickersteth, include detailed descriptions of the Anglican church's mission work in Japan as well as visits to sites such as the Shrines and Temples of Nikkō and the experience of surviving the strong Mino–Owari earthquake at Osaka on 28 October 1891.

Bickersteth edited hymnals and was an accomplished poet. Beginning with a volume of poems in 1849, he published extensively. His Hymnal Companion called forth from Dr. Julian, editor of A Dictionary of Hymnology, these high words of praise: "Of its kind and from its theological standpoint, as an evangelical hymn book, it is in poetic grace, literary excellence, and lyric beauty, the finest collection in the Anglican Church;" and the author's contributions to this volume are pronounced "very beautiful and of much value." His most popular hymn was "Peace, Perfect Peace".

== Family ==
Bickersteth married twice. His first marriage was in February 1848 to his cousin Rosa, daughter of Sir Samuel Bignold of Norwich; she died in 1873, having borne him six sons and ten daughters. Almost 20 years later, in 1876, he married his cousin Ellen Susanna, daughter of Robert Bickersteth of Liverpool, who survived him without issue.

== Arms ==
Coat of arms of Edward Bickersteth
Escutcheon Argent, a cross flory sable charged with five mullets or, on a chief azure three roses or.

Church of England titles
Preceded by Henry Law	Dean of Gloucester; 1885	Succeeded by Montagu Butler
Preceded by Frederick Temple	Bishop of Exeter; 1885–1900	Succeeded by Herbert Edward Ryle
