= St. Andrew's Cathedral, Tokyo =

St. Andrew's Cathedral
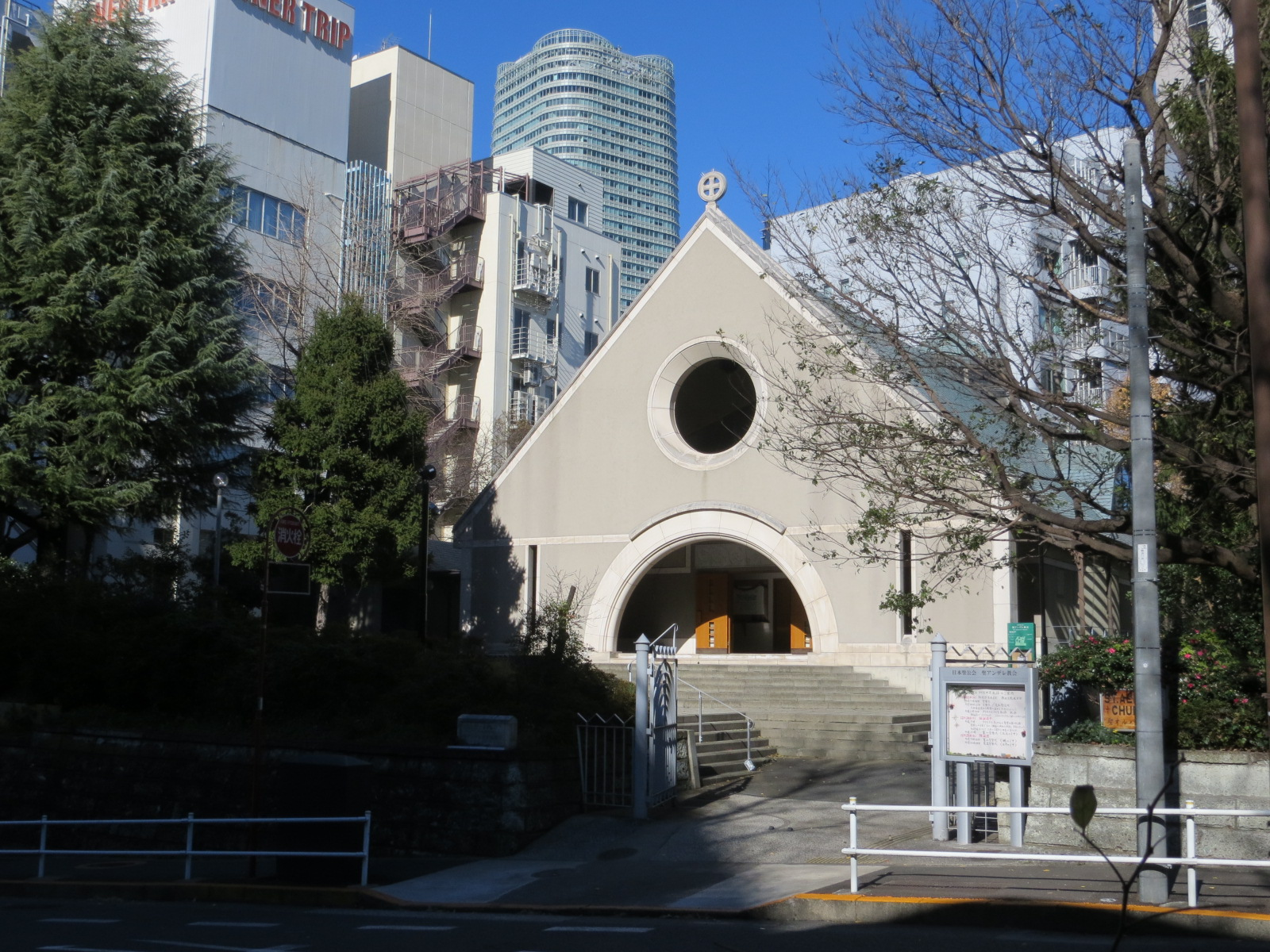
- St. Andrew's Cathedral, Tokyo
- St. Andrew's Cathedral
- 35°39′36″N 139°44′37″E
- Location: Shiba Koen, Tokyo
- Country: Japan
- Denomination: Anglican
- Website: St. Andrew's Cathedral

History
- Founded: 1879

Architecture
- Designated: 1879, 1894, 1945
- Years built: 1996

Administration
- Province: Japan
- Diocese: Tokyo

Clergy
- Bishop: The Right Revd Francis Xavier Hiroyuki
- Dean: Steven Jihwoong Tahk

St. Andrew's Cathedral, Tokyo (聖アンデレ主教座聖堂) is the Cathedral Church of the Tokyo Diocese of the Anglican Church in Japan (Nippon Sei Ko Kai).

The Diocese of Tokyo is one of eleven dioceses within the Anglican Church in Japan. There are over forty churches and chapels in the diocese with many church buildings, such as St. Andrew's, tracing their foundation back to the second half of the nineteenth century.

== History ==
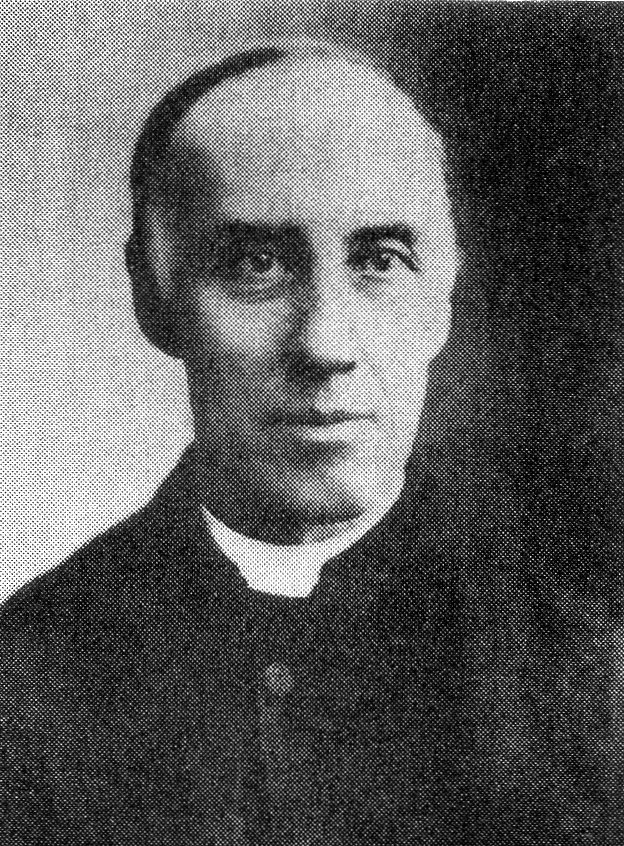
The Reverend Alexander Croft Shaw

St. Andrew's Church was established in 1879 by the Rev. Alexander Croft Shaw, a Canadian SPG missionary .

The original church building, a red brick, neo-Gothic structure, designed by Charles Alfred Chastel de Boinville, was dedicated on June 4, 1879. Construction was financed in part by contributions from foreign residents in Tokyo under the direction of British Envoy Sir Harry Smith Parkes as Chairman of the Church Committee.

Located on elevated ground at Shiba Koen, south of the Imperial Palace, the church soon became the center of Anglican Christian worship and clergy training in Tokyo. In 1888, Bishop Edward Bickersteth established the St. Andrew's Brotherhood in buildings adjoining the church to provide living quarters for unmarried clergy and a structured educational environment for seminarians. The St. Andrew's Brotherhood was not a monastic order, but the timetable of daily offices and collegial academic environment echoed much of Bickersteths's earlier leadership initiatives at the Cambridge Mission to Delhi.

The St. Hilda's Mission for women, also established by Bickersteth in 1888, was located close by at Azabu Nagazakacho, expanding on work begun by Alice Hoar, the first woman missionary of the SPG to reach Japan in 1875.

St. Andrew's, intended by Shaw primarily as a mission church for his Japanese congregation, was one of the first Anglican churches in Japan to have an autonomous, indigenous ministry when in 1894, the Rev. John Toshimichi Imai was appointed Rector. Imai had been ordained deacon in 1888 and was raised to the priesthood by Bishop Bickersteth in 1889, the first Japanese to become an ordained Anglican priest.

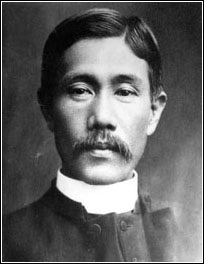
The Reverend John Toshimichi Imai

From its earliest days the St. Andrew's Church building was a resource shared between Japanese and English-speaking congregations, with members of the foreign community attending services conducted by the Rev. Armine F. King. Sir Ernest Satow, the British Envoy to Japan during the late 1890s, was an active supporter of the Diocese of South Tokyo, his published diaries record attending services, vestry meetings and social functions at the church.

The original building was destroyed in the 1894 earthquake but was quickly rebuilt as a small chapel adjacent to a larger wooden structure to accommodate the growing Japanese congregation.

St. Andrew's Church has received many prominent visitors over the years, notable on Good Friday, April 14, 1922, were the crowds lining the route for the visit of Edward, Prince of Wales as a part of his four-week official tour of Japan.

Supported by Primate Paul Shinji Sasaki and Bishop of South Tokyo Todomu Sugai, St. Andrew's Japanese congregation under the leadership of the Rev. Isaac Hidetoshi Nosse, resisted government pressure and police harassment during the Second World War to enable the church to retain its land, buildings and distinctive Anglican identity. However, like many urban Nippon Sei Ko Kai churches, medical and educational facilities, St. Andrew's buildings were lost in the 1945 Allied incendiary bombing.

The current cathedral building at Shiba Koen, built on the same site as the original church and close to the landmark Tokyo Tower, dates from 1996. As well as accommodating a full calendar of weekly worship services, the cathedral is also used as an occasional venue for musical recitals. Buildings on the cathedral grounds include St. Alban's Church, home to the Tokyo diocese's English-speaking congregation; church fellowship and meeting facilities; diocesan offices; and residential accommodation for clergy.

== St. Alban's by St. Andrew's ==
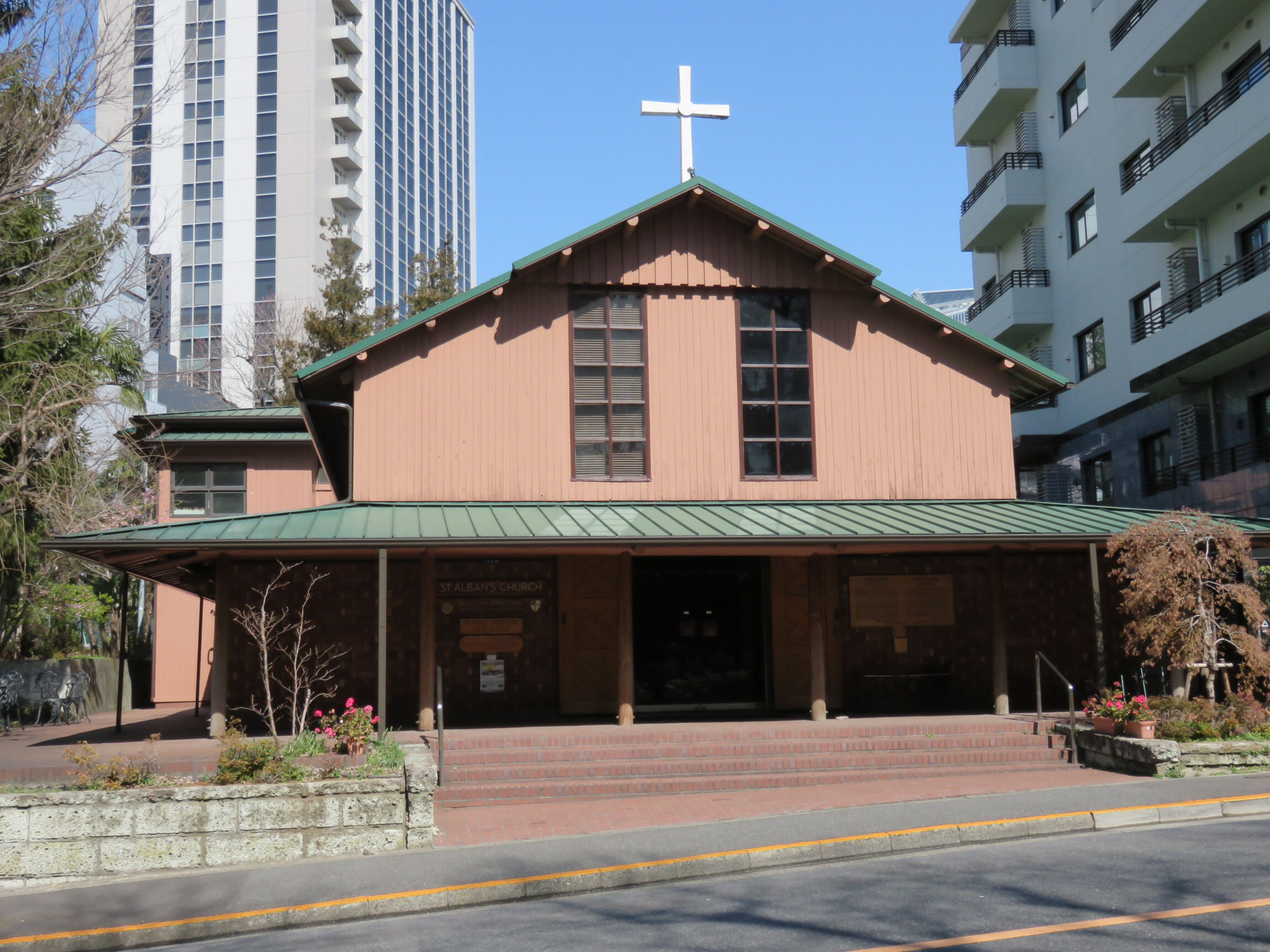
St. Alban's Church, Tokyo

Adjacent to St. Andrew's Cathedral at Shiba-koen is St. Alban's Church (聖オルバン教会), home of the Tokyo Diocese's English-speaking congregation and one of only three English-language–based congregations in the Nippon Sei Ko Kai (the other two being Christ Church in Yokohama and St. Michael's Church in Kobe, both sharing historic connections to the Mission to Seafarers).

Dedicated to the first English martyr Saint Alban, the historic wooden structure was designed by Czech American architect Antonin Raymond.

The current church building was consecrated on March 17, 1956, although English-language church services have been conducted on the same site almost continually since 1879.

== Gallery ==
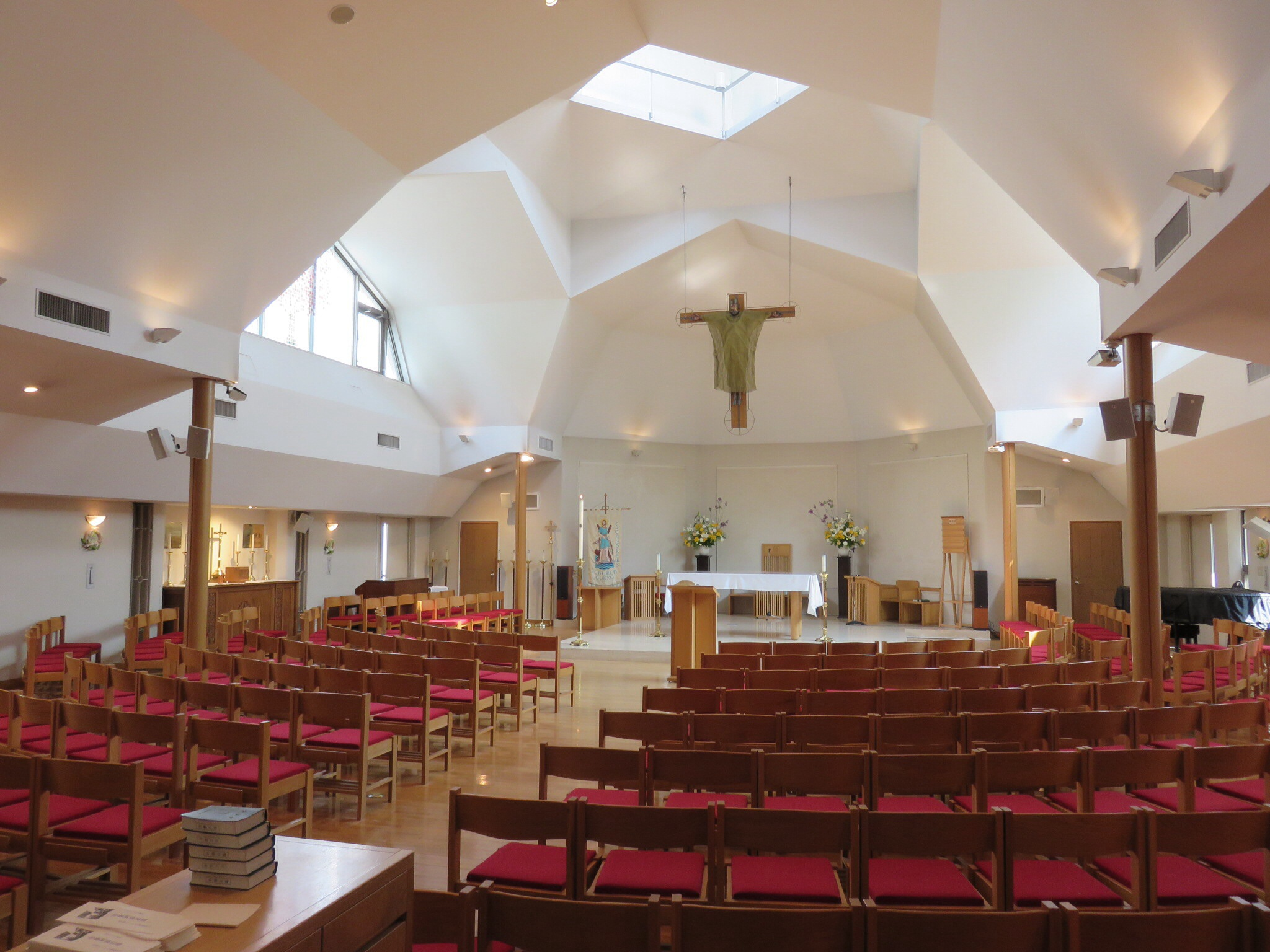
St. Andrew's Cathedral, Tokyo, Interior

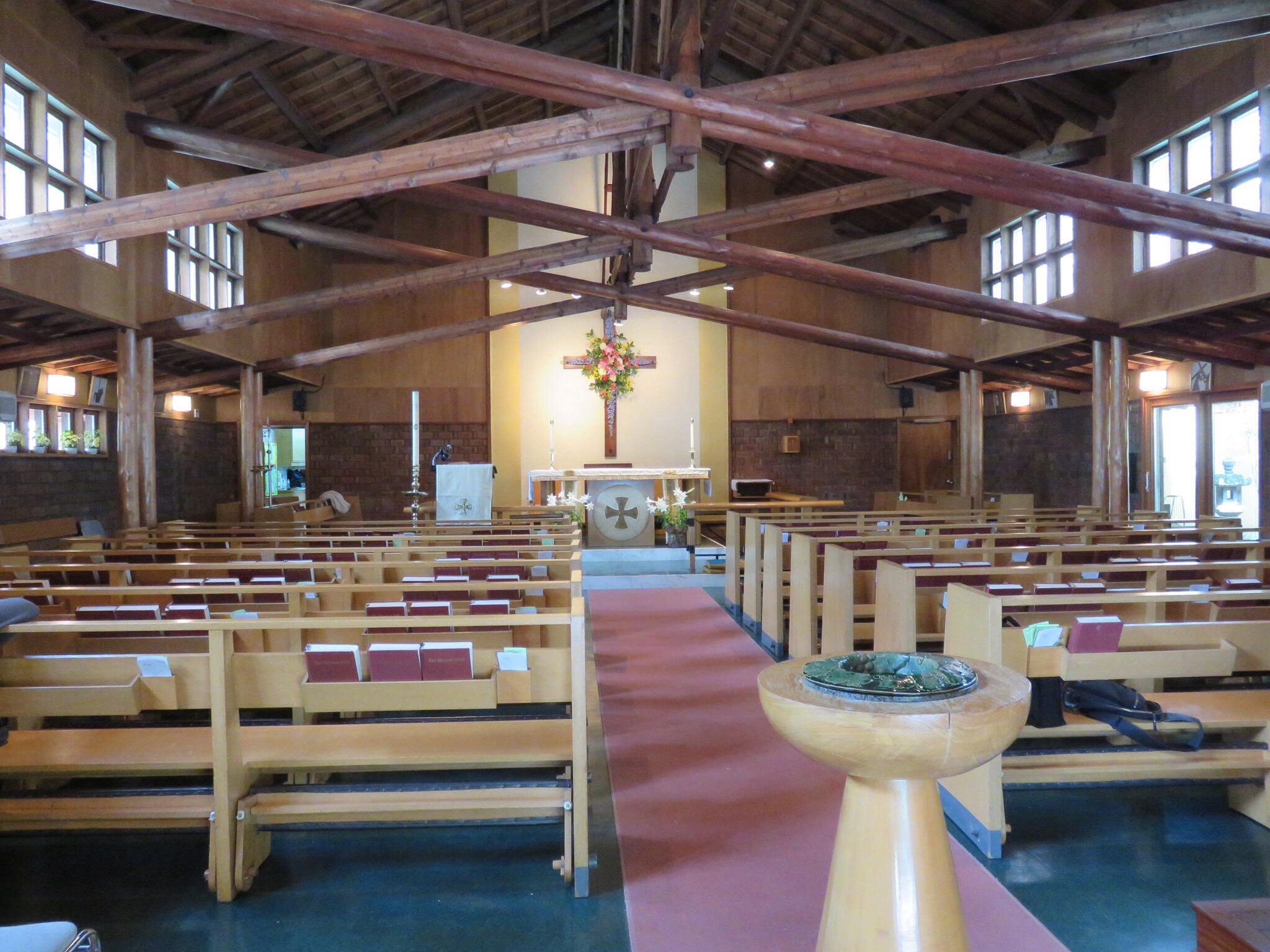
St. Alban's Church, Tokyo, Interior

== See also ==
- Anglican Communion
