= Continental Society =

Evangelical Christian missionary society

The Continental Society for the Diffusion of Religious Knowledge over the Continent of Europe (or simply Continental Society) was an evangelical Christian missionary society founded in London in 1819 for the propagation of the evangelical faith on the continent of Europe and existing as a separate entity until 1840 (see below).

The Continental Society was formed at the initiative of such men as Robert Haldane (in Geneva) and Henry Drummond.

Famous workers for the missionary society included Ami Bost, Henri Pyt, a French Swiss pastor who worked in France and others, many of whom worked in France, spreading the evangelical faith.

In 1823 German Christian Johann Gerhard Oncken was sent by the Continental Society to Hamburg. In due course Oncken founded the first Baptist church on German soil, which would become the centre of the Baptist movement in Germany and Europe.

Despite the Society's stated aim of supporting existing churches on the Continent and avoiding controversy over secondary issues, it is widely held that its decline was due to controversy over premillennial views and the promotion of separatist views of church polity at the expense of gospel preaching.

The fortunes of the Society peaked in the mid-1820s, but from 1830 onward declined. Maybe as early as 1836 the Society's name was changed to European Missionary Society. By 1840 the society was insolvent and forced to submit to a merger with the Anglican Central Committee to form the Foreign Aid Society, whose work continued until just before the First World War.
