= John Jennings (clergyman) =

Scottish-born Canadian clergyman

John Jennings (1814–1876) was a Scottish-born Presbyterian clergyman from Canada notable for promoting the cause of education in Upper Canada.
