= John Jennings (physician) =

Dr. John Jennings (fl. 18th-century) was an Irish physician.

Jennings was a member of the Mac Jonin family of Ironpool, Kilconly, Tuam, and a cousin of Charles Edward Jennings de Kilmaine. He died young from a fever he contracted while attending a patient in the neighbourhood of Tuam. His death occasioned a lament titled Doctúir Jennings, composed by Patrick Greaney.

== Extracts from the lament ==
A Dhochtúir Jennings, céad fároir cráidhte! Is tú fuair bás uainn i dtús do shaoghail: Dá siubhalainn Connacht agus Oileán Phádraic Samhail mo mhaighistir ní bhfuighinn i dtír

Nuair a bhreathnuighim síos ar Pholl an Iarrain, Cé an cás dom bliadhain acht arís go deó, Ins an áit a h'oileadh an leannaibh uasal. Acht nach truaigh sin a's mo chreach, é'r lár!
