= William W. Pearson =

British writer and educator in India (1881–1923)

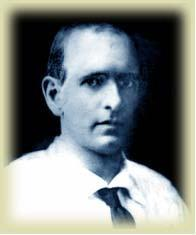
William Winstanley Pearson

William Winstanley Pearson was a pastor and educator, born in Manchester on 7 May 1881, and who died in Italy on 25 September 1923.

Pearson was the son of the Reverend Samuel Pearson, a Congregationalist minister, and his wife Bertha Eliza Pearson (née Crosfield).

He was a science graduate of Cambridge University. He was a member of the London Missionary Society. In 1907, he went to Calcutta, where he taught botany at the London Missionary College in Bhavanipur. He returned to England in 1911 and met Rabindranath Tagore in his own house in London. While in India, he met Mahatma Gandhi, and became a supporter of his action. He was a teacher in Tagore's school, Bolpur, and then in Shantiniketan. He translated some of Tagore's works into English.

In 1916, he became Tagore's secretary, and followed him on his journey to Japan and the United States. While in Japan, Tagore introduced him to Paul and Mirra Richard, disciples of Sri Aurobindo: they had a very strong influence on him. When Mirra settled at Pondicherry in 1920 and was known as The Mother, Pearson went there to meet Sri Aurobindo. In 1920-1921 again, he accompanied Tagore both in Europe and America.

Pearson was fatally injured in an accident on September 18, 1923, when he "fell down from a train" that was traveling from Milan to Florence, and transported to a hospital in Pistoia. According to a witness at his deathbed, Pearson's last words were "My only and one love— India"

== Works ==
- Introduction to a 1909 edition of Duties of Man by Joseph Mazzini
- For India, 1917
- Shantiniketan: the Bolpur School of Rabindranath Tagore, 1917
- The Dawn of a New Age, and Other Essays, 1922

== Sources ==
- Natl. bibliogr. of Indian lit. / gen. ed. B. S. Kesavan; V. Y. Kulkarni, 1962, vol 1, p. 339
