= Jack Jennings (Australian footballer) =

Australian rules footballer

Personal information
- Full name: John Jennings
- Born: 27 November 1875; Bendigo, Victoria
- Died: 2 April 1928 (aged 52); Brunswick, Victoria

Playing career^{1}
Years	Club	Games (Goals)
1897–98	St Kilda	13 (1)
- ^{1} Playing statistics correct to the end of 1898.

Jack Jennings (27 November 1875 – 2 April 1928) was an Australian rules footballer who played with St Kilda in the Victorian Football League (VFL).
