= Midgley John Jennings =

English missionary

The Revd. Midgley John Jennings
- Missionary

Orders
- Ordination: deacon in December 1830 priest in February 1831

Personal details
- Born: 8 June 1806 Stevenage, England
- Died: 11 May 1857 (aged 50) Delhi, India

Midgley John Jennings M.A. (8 June 1806 – 11 May 1857) a minister of the Church of England remembered for his work as a Christian missionary in India. Founder of the Society for the Propagation of the Gospel's Mission to Delhi.

Jennings was killed in Delhi along with family and other members of the mission at the outbreak of the Indian Rebellion of 1857.

== Background and early life ==
Born in Stevenage, England, on 8 June 1806, son of Midgley Jennings.

Educated at Christ's College, Cambridge, graduating with a B.A. in 1829 and received his master's degree in 1832. Ordained deacon at Lincoln in December 1830 and ordained priest in February 1831.

== Missionary work in India ==
Chaplain with the East India Company from 1832. Served variously at Cawnpore and other locations prior to a posting to Delhi in 1851. In Delhi as well as serving as chaplain to expatriate Europeans he focused on educational initiatives benefitting local students. Murdered on 11 May 1857 at the start of the uprising against East India Company rule.

== See also ==
- Indian Rebellion of 1857
