= Cambridge Mission to Delhi =

Anglican missionary initiative

The Leather-Workers of Daryaganj, a book by George Alfred Lefroy (1854–1919), published by the Cambridge Mission to Delhi in 1884.

The Cambridge Mission to Delhi was an Anglican Christian missionary initiative to India in the mid 19th and early 20th centuries led by graduates of the University of Cambridge. Individual members of the mission community are credited with helping to establish St. Stephens's College, a constituent College of the current University of Delhi, for social reform initiatives, and for providing support in the later years of the Indian independence movement.

The mission was formally established in 1877 under the leadership of Rev. Edward Bickersteth (1850–1897).

== History ==
In 1877, Rev. Edward Bickersteth, a fellow of Pembroke College, accompanied by Rev. John D.M. Murray, of St. John's College set out to India to support the mission work and educational initiatives of the Society for the Propagation of the Gospel. The work of the Cambridge Mission followed earlier Delhi mission initiatives by the Revd. Midgley John Jennings. Bickersteth and Murray, like many other early participants in the mission were students of the Cambridge biblical scholar and Regius Professor of Divinity, Brooke Foss Westcott.

Although Murray returned to England early due to ill health, the Rev. H.F. Blackett of St. John's College, the Rev. H.C. Carlyon of Sidney Sussex College and the Rev. Samuel Scott Allnutt of St. John's College all joined the mission in 1878. In 1879 Rev. George Lefroy joined the mission; he became Bishop of Lahore in 1899 and Bishop of Calcutta in 1912.

With the arrival of a larger group of Cambridge-educated Anglican missionaries, Bickersteth moved to establish a more structured residential community for the mission, which came to be known as the Cambridge Brotherhood. This pattern of communal living for unmarried mission clergy was replicated later by Bickersteth in Tokyo, with the establishment of the St. Andrew's Brotherhood on his appointment in 1886 as missionary bishop to Japan.

Among church pastoral initiatives in support of the work of the Society for the Propagation of the Gospel, the Cambridge Brotherhood in 1881 established St. Stephen's College, a constituent college of the current University of Delhi.

St Stephen's Hospital, Delhi was the mission's biggest hospital. There were several smaller hospitals in the surrounding area associated with the mission. Jenny Muller was the first full-time doctor on staff at St. Stephen's Hospital in Delhi. Marie Elizabeth Hayes, from Raheny, Ireland, was another medical missionary.

In 1904, Rev. Frederick Western and Rev. Charles Freer Andrews travelled to India to join the mission community and teach at St. Stephen's College. A friend of Mahatma Gandhi, Andrews later worked on social reform issues and supported the Indian independence movement.

In 1968, the Cambridge Mission to Delhi was formally absorbed into the United Society for the Propagation of the Gospel (USPG), a United Kingdom-based registered Anglican charity now known as the United Society or Us.

== The Delhi Brotherhood Society ==
The Delhi Brotherhood Society, a mission focused NGO running programs related to shelter, education, and social advocacy, traces its origins to the work of the original Cambridge Mission. Today the Brothers continue to live a semi-monastic lifestyle, participating in church outreach and welfare initiatives benefitting underprivileged communities throughout the city.

== See also ==
- Anglican Communion
- Cambridge University
- Westcott House, Cambridge
- St. Stephen's College, Delhi
- Charles Freer Andrews
- Delhi Brotherhood Society
