= Edward Bickersteth (bishop of South Tokyo) =

19th-century British Anglican bishop and missionary

The Rt Revd Edward Bickersteth
- Missionary, Bishop of South Tokyo
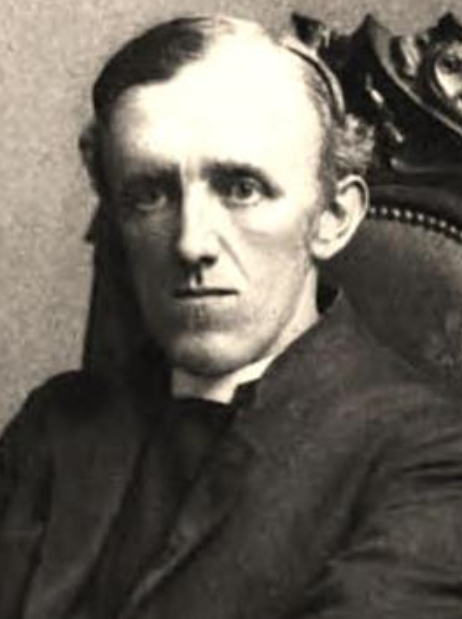
- Bishop Edward Bickersteth
- Province: Anglican Church in Japan

Personal details
- Born: 26 June 1850 Banningham, England
- Died: 5 August 1897 (aged 47) Chiseldon, England
- Parents: Edward Bickersteth
- Education: Pembroke College, Cambridge

Edward Bickersteth (26 June 1850 – 5 August 1897) was an ordained Anglican missionary, Bishop of South Tokyo, and a leading figure in both the establishment of the Cambridge Mission to Delhi and in the early years of the Anglican Church in Japan.

== Early life and education ==
Edward Bickersteth was born at Banningham, Norfolk into a noted Church of England ecclesiastical family; his father, Edward Henry Bickersteth, was the Bishop of Exeter from 1885 to 1900. He was educated at Highgate School where he excelled in academic studies and athletics, winning an open classical scholarship to Pembroke College, Cambridge in 1869. At Cambridge, as well as studying for ordination, he obtained both classical and theological degrees with honours and was elected a Fellow of his college in 1875.

In 1873, Bickersteth took up his first post as a curate at Holy Trinity, South Hampstead. He was then appointed lecturer in Theology at Pembroke and in 1877 founded and led the Cambridge Mission to Delhi, an initiative in support of the North India mission and educational work of the Society for the Propagation of the Gospel.

After seven years in India, Bickersteth returned to England to become rector of the Church of St. Michael, Framlingham, Suffolk.

== Missionary bishop in Japan ==
Consecrated in February 1886 at St Paul's Cathedral by Archbishop Benson, as Missionary-Bishop of the Church of England in Japan, Bickersteth arrived at Nagasaki on 13 April the same year.

Working from the church's mission centre at St. Andrew's Church in Tokyo, Bickersteth is remembered for his commitment to building a Japanese-led, indigenous, Anglican Church. In February 1887, at a meeting in Osaka instigated by Bickersteth and presided over by Bishop Channing Moore Williams, it was agreed to unite the various Anglican missionary efforts in Japan into one autonomous national church; the Nippon Sei Ko Kai. Bickersteth is also remembered for his leadership and skill in the development of a constitution, Canons, Prayer Book and comprehensive mission program for the Nippon Sei Ko Kai. His "watchful care and strong influence" led to a punishing schedule on the road, travelling between the scattered mission churches in Japan for eight months of the year.

In 1891, Bickersteth was visited in Japan by his father, Edward Henry Bickersteth, Bishop of Exeter. The travel journal of Mary Jane Bickersteth, who accompanied the tour of Japan, includes detailed descriptions of the Anglican church's mission work, visits to sites such as the Shrines and Temples of Nikkō, a meeting with Fukuzawa Yukichi and the experience of surviving the strong Mino–Owari earthquake at Osaka on 28 October 1891.

Bickersteth, suffering from failing health brought on by overwork, died on 5 August 1897 at Chiseldon, Wiltshire shortly after speaking on "The Development of Native Churches" at the opening meetings of the Fourth Lambeth Conference.

Bickersteth's funeral and interment at Chiseldon was attended by, among others, Bishop John McKim of North Tokyo and Sir Ernest Satow, British Envoy to Japan.

== Family ==
On a visit to England in the summer of 1893, Bickersteth met Marion Forsyth, the daughter of William Forsyth QC, formerly Conservative Member of Parliament for Marylebone. After a short courtship and engagement, they were married on 28 September. There were no children from the marriage.

The couple set out to return to Japan, via Canada, on 21 October 1893. The Fourth Synod of the Nippon Sei Ko Kai was held in Tokyo in November 1893, shortly after Bickersteth's return to his full-time pastoral duties.

Nippon Sei Ko Kai
Preceded by Inaugural appointment	Bishop of South Tokyo; 1866 – 1897	Succeeded by William Awdry
