= John Johnston =

John Johnston may refer to:

== Entertainment ==
- John Johnston (poet) (c. 1570–1611), Scottish poet and academic
- John S. Johnston (c. 1839–1899), American maritime photographer
- Johnnie Johnston (1915–1996), American actor and singer
- John Dennis Johnston (born 1945), American actor

== Politics ==
- John W. Johnston (mayor) (1774–1854), St. Louis, Missouri, US
- John Johnston (Indian agent) (1775–1861), US
- John Johnston (Nova Scotia politician) (1790–1836)
- John Johnston (New Zealand politician) (1809–1887)
- John W. Johnston (1818–1889), senator from Virginia, US
- John Johnston (Australian politician) (1823–1872)
- John R. Johnston (died 1863), mayor of Hoboken, New Jersey, US
- John Kenneth Johnston (1865–1945), Canadian politician
- John Frederick Johnston (1876–1948), Canadian politician
- John B. Johnston (1882–1960), U.S. Representative
- John Stewart Johnston (1905/6–?), Northern Irish politician
- John Baines Johnston (1918–2005), British diplomat
- John Johnston (courtier) (1922–2006), UK
- J. Bennett Johnston (1932–2025), U.S. Senator
- John Benjamin Johnston, Canadian politician

== Sports ==
- John Johnston (footballer, born 1878) (1876–1955), Scottish footballer (Bury FC, Southampton FC)
- John Johnston (football full-back), footballer for Sunderland
- Johnny Johnston (baseball) (1890–1940), American baseball player
- John Johnston (footballer, born 1902) (1902–1987), Scottish international footballer
- John Johnston (footballer, born 1921) (1921–1989), Scottish footballer (Motherwell FC, Hamilton Academical)
- Johnny Johnston (footballer) (born 1947), Northern Irish footballer
- Johnny Johnston (cricketer) (1953–2008), English cricketer

== Other ==
- Sir John Johnston, 3rd Baronet (c. 1648–1690), Scottish soldier
- John Johnston (chemist) (1881–1950), Scottish-born chemist
- John Johnson (architect, born 1732) (1732–1814) English architect
- John Johnston (fur trader) (1762–1828), British
- John Johnston (merchant) (1781–1851), Scottish-American merchant
- John Johnston (farmer) (1791–1880), Scotland
- John Taylor Johnston (1820–1893), founder of the Metropolitan Museum of Art
- John R. Johnston (1826–1895), landscape and panorama painter
- John Lawson Johnston (1839–1900), Scottish businessman
- John Johnston (priest) (1852–1923), Anglican clergyman
- John Johnston (schoolmaster) (1871– 1938), a British educator
- John McQueen Johnston (1901–1987), Scottish physician
- John Johnston (econometrician) (1923–2003), British academic
- John V. Johnston (died 1912), U.S. Navy officer
- John Johnston (physiotherapist), Scottish-born Australian physiotherapist
- John Johnston, 13-year-old boy murdered in 1923 by Susan Newell in Coatbridge, Scotland
- Johnny Johnston of The Johnston Brothers

== See also ==
- John Jonston (1603–1675), Polish scholar, physician, naturalist, botanist, and entomologist
- John Johnson (disambiguation)
- John Johnstone (disambiguation)
- Johnnie or Johnny Johnston (disambiguation)
