= John Johnson =

John Johnson may refer to:

== Academia ==
- John de Monins Johnson (1882–1956), scholar and printer
- John Wesley Johnson (academic administrator) (1836–1898), first president of the University of Oregon
- John Bertrand Johnson (1887–1970), scientist–engineer after whom Johnson noise is named
- John R. Johnson (1900–1983), American chemist
- John P. Johnson (academic administrator), fifth president of Embry-Riddle Aeronautical University
- John Johnson (astronomer), (born 1977), current Harvard professor

== Artists and entertainers ==
- John Johnson (composer) (c. 1545–1594), English lutenist and composer
- John Johnson (photographer) (1879–1953), American photographer
- J. Rosamond Johnson (1873–1954), composer and opera singer
- John Lester Johnson (1893–1968), American boxer and actor
- John Seward Johnson II (1930–2020), American artist
- John Johnson (reporter) (born 1938), American television reporter and anchor
- John Lee Johnson (born 1944), American drummer, better known by his stage names Jai Johanny Johanson and Jaimoe
- John Johnson (musician) (1964–2017), trombonist and percussionist with Simply Red
- John Seward Johnson III (born 1966), American filmmaker, philanthropist, and entrepreneur
- John H. Johnson (1918–2005), founder of the Johnson Publishing Company (Ebony and Jet magazines)

== Architects ==
- John Johnson (architect, born 1732) (1732–1814), English architect and surveyor
- John Johnson (architect, born 1807) (1807–1878), English architect
- John Johnson (architect, born 1843) (1843–1919), English architect

== Sportsmen ==
=== American football ===
- John Johnson (trainer) (1917–2016), athletic trainer for the New York Giants
- John Henry Johnson (1929–2011)
- John Johnson (defensive tackle) (1941–2025)
- John Johnson (linebacker) (born 1968)
- John Johnson (safety) (born 1995)

=== Baseball ===
- Lou Johnson (pitcher) (John Louis Johnson, 1869–1941), Major League pitcher
- Jack Johnson (second baseman) (John Thomas Johnson, 1883–1940), American baseball player
- John Wesley Johnson (baseball), American baseball player of the 1920s and 1930s
- John Wesley Johnson Jr. (1916–1944), American baseball player
- John Henry Johnson (baseball) (born 1956), Major League pitcher

=== Other sports ===
- Jack Johnson (John Arthur Johnson, 1878–1946), American boxer and first black heavyweight champion
- John Johnson (cricketer, born 1809) (1809–1877), English cricketer
- John Johnson (cricketer, born 1871) (1871–1930), English cricketer
- John S. Johnson (sportsman) (1873–1934), American cyclist and speed skater
- John Lester Johnson, (1893–1968), American boxer and actor
- John Johnson (rugby league), footballer of the 1930s
- John Johnson (basketball, born 1947) (1947–2016), American basketball player
- John Johnson (basketball, born 1956), American basketball player
- John Michael Johnson (born 1968), American bantamweight boxer
- John Johnson (footballer) (born 1988), English footballer

== Lawyers ==
- John Calhoun Johnson (1822–1876), practiced law and operated a ranch in California
- John Henry Johnson (patent attorney) (1828–1900)
- John G. Johnson (1841–1917), U.S. corporate lawyer and art collector
- John Alvin Johnson (1915–2005), U.S. lawyer and businessman

== Military figures ==
- John Johnson, 8th Seigneur of Sark (died 1723), Seigneur of Sark, 1720–1723
- Sir John Johnson, 2nd Baronet (1741–1830), loyalist leader during the American Revolution
- Liver-Eating Johnson (1824–1900), American frontier figure
- John Johnson (Medal of Honor, 1839) (1839–?), United States Navy sailor
- John Johnson (Medal of Honor, 1842) (1842–1907), Norwegian-American Medal of Honor recipient
- John D. Johnson (general) (born 1952), U.S. Army general
- John P. Johnson (general) (born 1963), U.S. Army general

== Politicians and public servants ==
=== United States ===
- John Johnson (Ohio congressman) (1805–1867), politician
- John A. Johnson (Minnesota politician) (1883–1962)
- John Albert Johnson (1861–1909), 16th governor of Minnesota
- John Anders Johnson (1832–1901), Wisconsin state senator and assemblyman from Madison
- John E. Johnson (Brandon) (1873–1951), Wisconsin state assemblyman from Brandon, Wisconsin
- John E. Johnson (Utica) (1829–?), Wisconsin state assemblyman from Utica, Wisconsin
- John Johnson (Mississippi politician) (1920–2002), Mississippi state representative and senator
- John J. Johnson (1926–2016), Missouri state senator
- John Kelly Johnson (1841–1894), Iowa state court judge and legislator
- John Warren Johnson (1929–2023), Minnesota state legislator
- John Telemachus Johnson (1788–1856), U.S. Representative from Kentucky
- John Johnson (Kansas City mayor) (1816–1903), mayor of Kansas City, Missouri
- J. Neely Johnson (1825–1872), California politician and politician
- John Johnson (Wisconsin politician) (1833–1892), Wisconsin State Assemblyman from York, Dane County, Wisconsin
- John Johnson (Ohio state representative) (born 1937), former member of the Ohio House of Representatives
- John Johnson Sr. (1770–1824), Chancellor of Maryland
- John Johnson Jr. (1798–1856), Chancellor of Maryland
- John Johnson (Indiana judge) (1776–1817), associate justice of the Indiana Supreme Court
- John T. Johnson (Oklahoma judge) (1856–1935), associate justice of the Oklahoma Supreme Court
- John B. Johnson (politician) (1885–1985), American politician in the South Dakota State Senate
- John Ramsey Johnson (born 1945), associate judge of the Superior Court of the District of Columbia
- J. B. Johnson (Florida politician) (1868–1940), 23rd Florida Attorney General
- John S. Johnson (politician) (1854–1941), member of the North Dakota House of Representatives
- John D. Johnson (politician), member of the Utah State Senate

=== Other countries ===
- John Johnson, alias of John Cornelius (MP) (died 1567), English politician
- Johno Johnson (1930–2017), Australian politician
- John Mercer Johnson (1818–1868), Canadian politician
- John Johnson (diplomat) (1930–2018), British colonial administrator and diplomat
- John Smoke Johnson (1792–1886), Mohawk chief
- John William Fordham Johnson (1866–1938), lieutenant governor of British Columbia
- John Johnson (British politician) (1850–1910), British trade unionist and politician
- John Mordaunt Johnson (c. 1776–1815), British diplomat around the time of the Napoleonic Wars
- John George Johnson (1829–1896), British member of parliament for Exeter
- John Wesley Johnson (politician), member of the Ontario Provincial Parliament

== Religious figures ==
- John Johnson (theologian) (1662–1725), English clergyman and theologian
- John Johnson (baptist) (1706–1791), English minister, founder of the Johnsonian Baptists
- John Johnson (clergyman) (1769–1833), Church of England clergyman, poet, and editor
- John Johnson (Latter Day Saints) (1778–1843), early Latter Day Saint and owner of the John Johnson Farm, a historical site in Mormonism
- Enmegahbowh (c. 1820–1902), also known as John Johnson, first Native American Episcopal priest

== Others ==
- John Johnson (explorer), Arctic explorer and World War II veteran
- John Johnson (mass murderer) (1810–1838), convicted perpetrator of the Myall Creek massacre
- John O. Johnson (1875–1963), American boat builder, aviator and inventor
- John H. Johnson (baseball) (1921–1988), minor league baseball executive
- John Seward Johnson I (1895–1983), founded the Harbor Branch Oceanographic Institution
- Guy Fawkes (1570–1606) or John Johnson
- John Johnson, one of the Colchester Martyrs
- John & Thomas Johnson, a soap and alkali manufacturing business in Runcorn, Cheshire, England
- John Mushmouth Johnson (1856–1907), American gambler and businessman in Chicago

== See also ==
- Johnnie Johnson (disambiguation)
- Johnny Johnson (disambiguation)
- Jack Johnson (disambiguation)
- J. Erik Jonsson (1901–1995), businessman and mayor of Dallas
- John Johnston (disambiguation)
- Jon Johnson (born 1954), American sound editor
- Jon Jonsson (disambiguation)
- Jonathan Johnson (disambiguation)
- John Johnsen (disambiguation)
