= Auckland House School, Shimla =

Auckland House School
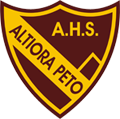
- Auckland House School crest

Location
- Elysium Hill, Longwood, Shimla, Himachal Pradesh; India; 31.1101099°N 77.1791204°E

Information
- Type: Private unaided
- Motto: Latin: Altiora Peto ("I seek the higher things")
- Religious affiliation: Protestant
- Established: 1866; 160 years ago (Girls); 2008; 18 years ago (Boys)
- Founders: Sophia Annie Cotton
- School district: Shimla
- Principal: Mrs. Smaraki Smantaroy (Girls); Mr. Reuben T. John (Boys)
- Houses: Matthew; French; Lefroy; Durrant
- Colours: Brown & Yellow (Girls); Brown & White (Boys)
- Affiliation: CISCE
- Website: www.aucklandhouseschool.in (Girls) www.aucklandhouseschoolboys.in (Boys)

Auckland House School (AHS) is a girls—only school in Shimla, Himachal Pradesh, India. It was started by Sophia Annie Cotton (née Tomkinson), wife of Bishop George Cotton as Punjab Girls' School in 1866. The school building is located at the former residence of George Eden (Lord Auckland), Governor-General of India. The school originally served 32 students at Holly Lodge, Shimla. Lord Auckland sold the house in 1868; the local school board moved the institution to Longwood in 1869. A namesake brother school only for boys was established in 2008 on the neighbouring Belvedere Estate campus. Auckland House was rated among India's top schools in a survey by Mainline Media and The Pioneer awarded the school an A+++ rating based on a perception survey conducted amidst the public and academicians. It is affiliated to ICSE. Today, the School is managed by The Church of North India (CNI).

== History ==
Auckland House School has an interesting history that dates back to 1836 when Lord Auckland, the Governor-General at the time, purchased the house. Later, when the Viceroys moved elsewhere, the school authorities bought the house in 1868. In 1864, Rev. J.B. D'Aquilar initiated the idea of establishing a school for girls to provide them with quality education based on Christian principles. The Church-related ladies group in Dalhousie gave shape to this idea, and the school was initially planned to be set up in Dharamshala. However, at the behest of the wife of George Edward Lynch Cotton, it was founded in Shimla in 1866 at Holly Lodge on Jakhu Hill and was known as "The Punjab Girls School". The school started with 32 students, and Mrs. Mackinnon was the Headmistress at the time. In 1904, Miss Strong from Cheltenham Ladies College became the Headmistress, and the school gained popularity, earning the name "The Cheltenham College of India". In 1905, the school building suffered extensive damage during the Kangra earthquake, resulting in the Governors' decision to demolish it and build a new one on the same site. The construction of the new building began in December 1920 and was completed by January 1921. From 1908 to 1952, St. Hilda's Society, Lahore, substantiated the school with principals and staff, during which time Indian girls started to be admitted. Students from various countries, including Thailand, Ethiopia, Turkey, Australia, and New Zealand, were enrolled at the newly built Auckland House, which resumed classes after the earthquake. In 1962, the School acquired the "Belvedere" estate, which is now the boys' campus, marking another milestone in its expansion. Auckland House School provides education to the children of parents who work in various countries across Africa, Asia, Europe, and the Americas. It also accommodates children whose parents work in the Armed Forces or Central Government, offering them a consistent education through the 'boarding house' option. Over the years, the school has grown from a small institution with 32 students to one of the finest in India, boasting a strength of over 1400 students.

== House System ==
House System
House Name	Named after	Motto	Colour	Swatch
Matthew	Henry James Matthew	Neque Deditionem ("No Surrender")	Cardinal Red	
Lefroy	George Alfred Lefroy	Ludere Ludum ("Play the Game")	Byzantine Purple	
French	Thomas Valpy French	Sed Perseverantia ("We Press On")	Cadmium Green	
Durrant	Henry Bickersteth Durrant	Hononem ante Honorem ("Honour before Honours")	Yale Blue	

Each house at Auckland House School, named after a significant catholic figure, has its own color, motto, and crest. Students are assigned to a house when they join the school and participate in various inter-house competitions and events throughout the academic year. These competitions include sports, debates, music, drama, and other extracurricular activities. The students also take part in community service projects and other social initiatives under their respective house banners.

The house system is an integral part of the school's ethos and culture. The school also has a housemaster or housemistress for each house, who acts as a mentor and guide for the students.
