= Chapslee Estate =

Residential property in Shimla, Himachal Pradesh, India

Coordinates: 31.109°N 77.179°E

Chapslee Estate is a residential property in Bharari adjacent to the Lakkar Bazaar in Shimla, Himachal Pradesh, India. The estate houses the erstwhile Secretary's Lodge which is now a heritage hotel run by the erstwhile Maharaja of Kapurthala.

== History ==
Chapslee is one of the oldest estates in Shimla having been built between 1828 and 1835. It was built by Doctor Blake, a surgeon in the service of the British East India Company.

Lord Auckland, Governor General of the East India Company Territories, was a resident of the adjoining Auckland House. Finding the accommodation insufficient, he took this property first on rent and later purchased it in 1836, to house his private & Military Secretaries, ‘Aides De Camps’ (ADC's) and named it ‘Secretary’s Lodge’.

The Estate now has a school on it, and the home is run as an exclusive, heritage home by the owner Kanwar Ratanjit Singh and his family. He is the grandson of Raja Charanjit Singh of Kapurthala.

== First Anglo-Afghan War ==
In June 1838, a tripartite treaty between the Government of India, Ranjit Singh and Shah Shuja was signed for the latter's restoration. Following this, Lord Auckland issued the Simla Manifesto announcing the intention of the Government of India to restore Shah Shuja to the throne of Afghanistan.

The ‘Simlah Manifesto’, declaring the first war with Afghanistan, was issued from ‘Secretary’s Lodge’ on 1 October 1838. Lord Ellenborough, who succeeded Lord Auckland as Governor General acknowledged the failure of Lord Auckland's policy in Afghanistan. On 1 October 1842, precisely four years after the issue of the Simla Manifesto, the Government proclaimed its altered intentions.

Lord Hardinge, who succeeded Lord Ellenborough as Governor General, continued to use Secretary's Lodge as the Government Secretariat. General Peter Innes of the Bengal Army purchased Secretary's Lodge in 1848 and changed its name to Chapslee. General Innes sold the house in 1870 and, thereafter, it changed hands every few years and served as the residence of famous persons, including Colonel William Gordon (around 1877), Sir Courtenay Ilbert, General Pemberton, General Sir C. E. Nairne, Surgeon-General Bradshaw, Surgeon-General Cleghorn and so on.

Sir Arthur Mitford Ker, CIE, MVO, manager of the Alliance Bank, eventually purchased it in 1896, and improved its looks to the way it stands today. He not only retained the original structure but enlarged it significantly.

Raja Charanjit Singh of Kapurthala purchased the estate after the demise of Sir Arthur Mitford Ker. He converted it to his summer residence and refurnished the interiors. Raja Charanjit Singh died in 1970.

Kanwar Ratanjit Singh, the grandson of the Late Raja Charanjit Singh of Kapurthala, is the present owner. He started a school, known as ‘Chapslee School’, on the premises in 1973 and converted the estate to a hotel in 1976. Chapslee was one of the first ‘heritage hotels’ in India.

Parts of the estate were sold to different people in the 1970s post the land ceiling act imposed by the Government of India.

In keeping with the rule of restricted roads in Shimla, only vehicles with special permit are allowed to ply through the estate road.

The estate is en route to Longwood, a residential locality of Shimla.

== In news ==
Chapslee Estate featured on CNN in season 3 episode 1 "Punjab, India" of Anthony Bourdain: Parts Unknown, which was broadcast on 13 April 2014.
