= Laurence Woolmer =

Laurence Henry Woolmer (1906 – 1977) was the Bishop of Lahore, Pakistan, from 1949 until 1968. Educated at King Edward's School, Birmingham, and St Peter's College, Oxford, he was a banker before being ordained in 1938. After a curacy at St Paul's, Salisbury, he became a Missionary in India, eventually rising to be Archdeacon of Lahore before elevation to the episcopate. After 19 years he returned to be Vicar of Meonstoke with Corhampton and Exton. His Times obituary described him as

"a man of prayer whose boundless energy and zeal showed the spirit of Christ in all his dealings.”

== Notes ==
Church of England titles
Preceded by George Dunsford Barne	Bishop of Lahore; 1949 – 1968	Succeeded by Inayat Masih as Bishop of Lahore in the Church of Pakistan
