= Bharari =

Neighbourhood in Shimla, Himachal Pradesh, India

- Neighbourhood
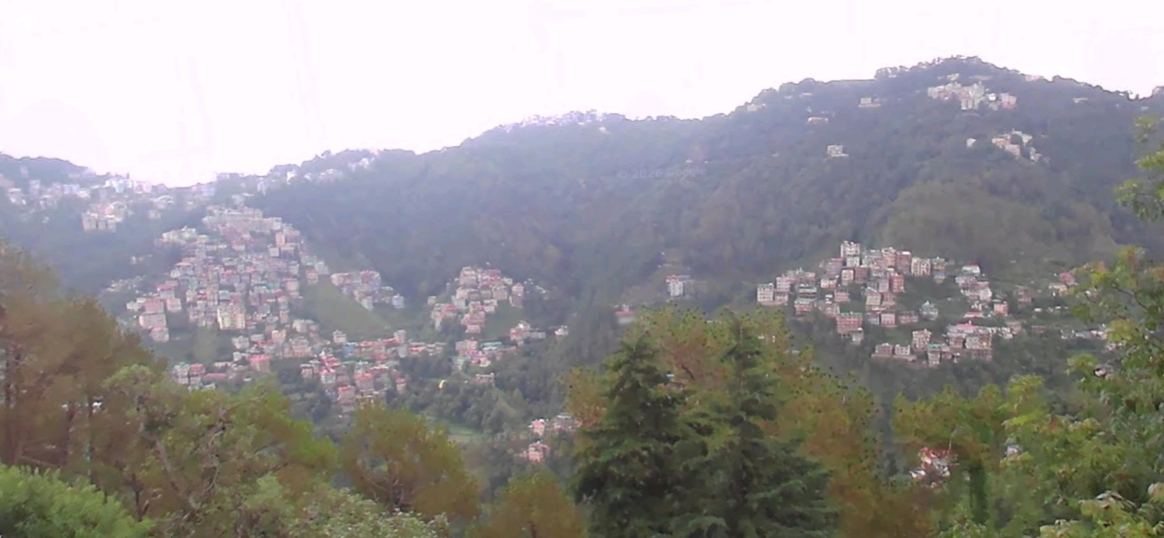
- Bharari atop of hill, on the left side of the image above Kuftadhar and left of Longwood as viewed from Chungi Khana in Lower Kaithu
- Interactive map of Bharari
- Coordinates: 31.124842°N 77.176139°E
- Country: India
- State: Himachal Pradesh
- District: Shimla
- City: Shimla
- Elevation: 2,158 m (7,080 ft)
- PIN: 171001

Bharari is a part of Shimla in the North Indian state of Himachal Pradesh. It is located in the northern part of the city.

== Geography ==
Bharari is situated on the elevated ridge network extending from central Shimla toward Longwood and Sanjauli. The terrain is mountainous as it is in Shimla, with narrow roads, dense deodar vegetation, and steep valleys descending below the ridge. According to geographical descriptions of Shimla, Bharari forms part of the northern arm of the city’s ridge system together with Longwood and Kelston.

== Connectivity ==
The locality connects several important areas of the city such as Longwood, Lakkar Bazaar, Sanjauli, Mall Road and Jakhu slopes. The Bharari Road is an important urban route in Shimla. Because of Shimla’s terrain, roads are narrow and often cut into steep mountainsides. Traffic congestion occurs here sometimes, especially during tourist season and snowfall periods. Pedestrian movement remains important in the locality, as many internal paths and stairways connect houses on different elevations.

== Importance ==
=== Historical importance ===
Like many old Shimla localities, Bharari developed during the British colonial period when Shimla expanded from a small hill settlement into the summer capital of British India. During Britich times, The ridge roads around Bharari became important residential and transit corridors, colonial bungalows and estate houses were built on surrounding slopes, forest walks connected Bharari with Jakhu and central Shimla. The area remained quieter and less commercial than the Mall Road core. Bharari still preserves some old estate-style architecture and wooded character compared to heavily commercialized sections of modern Shimla.

=== Current importance ===
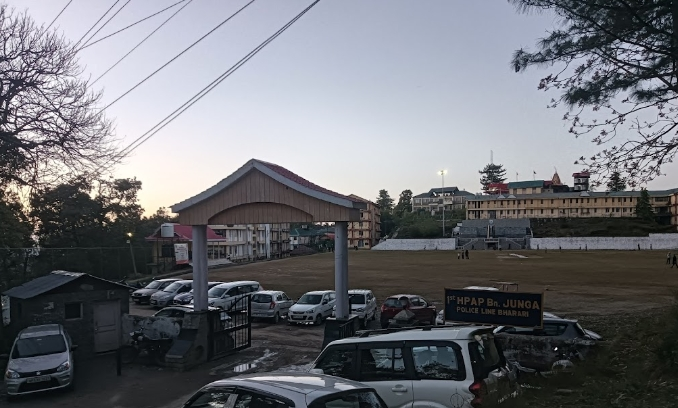
Police Ground, Bharari

Bharari is home to Police Lines, which includes a large Police ground in which ground tests for selection in Himachal Pradesh Police is done frequently, where aspirants come for the test from various parts of the state. Bharari also has one of the city's best schools such as Laurete Public School and Chapslee School in Chapslee Estate.
