= Jack Johnson (disambiguation) =

Jack Johnson (1878–1946) was an American boxer who became the first black heavyweight boxing world champion.

Jack Johnson also commonly refers to:

- Jack Johnson (musician) (born 1975), American singer-songwriter, director, and surfer

Jack Johnson may also refer to:

== Entertainment ==
- Jack Johnson (actor) (born 1987), American actor
- Jack Johnson (film), a 1970 documentary film about the boxer
- Jack Johnson (album), a 1971 album by Miles Davis
- Jack Johnson (character), a fictional character in the U.S. TV series Black-ish
- Big Jack Johnson (1940–2011), blues musician
- Jack Johnson, member of the American pop-rap duo Jack & Jack

== Politics ==
- Jack Johnson (Canadian politician) (1930–2009), politician in Ontario, Canada
- Jack B. Johnson (born 1949), American criminal and former politician
- Jack Johnson (American politician) (born 1968), American politician in Tennessee

== Sports ==
=== American football ===
- Jack Johnson (coach) (1892–1927), American football, basketball, and baseball coach
- Jack Johnson (tackle) (1909–1978), American football tackle
- Jack Johnson (defensive back) (1933–2015), American football defensive back

=== Baseball ===
- Jack Johnson (second baseman) (1883–1940), African-American baseball player and boxer, nicknamed "Topeka Jack"
- Jack Johnson (outfielder), Negro league baseball player of the 1920s
- Jack Johnson (third baseman), Negro league baseball player of the 1930s

=== Other sports ===
- Jack Johnson (English footballer) (1919–1975), English footballer
- Jack Johnson (Australian footballer) (1926–2008), Australian rules footballer for Essendon
- Jack Johnson (sport shooter) (1928-1993), American sport shooter
- Jack Johnson (ice hockey) (born 1987), American professional ice hockey defenseman
- Jack Johnson (rugby league) (born 1996), English rugby league footballer
- Jack Johnson (real tennis) (1914–1996), real tennis world champion
- Jack Johnson (Danish footballer) (1924–2002), Danish footballer
- Jack Johnson (racing driver) (September 2, 1944 – April 1, 2021), American dirt modified racing driver.

== Other ==
- Jack Johnson (posseman) (died 1887), one of Wyatt Earp's posse

== See also ==
- Jake Johnson (disambiguation)
- John Johnson (disambiguation)
