= Bishop of Lahore =

The Bishop of Lahore may refer to:

- the United Protestant Bishop of Lahore
  - the former Anglican Bishop of Lahore
- the Roman Catholic Bishop of Lahore, in use from 1886 until 1994 when the diocese was elevated to an archdiocese
