= Johnny Johnson =

Johnny Johnson may refer to:

== People ==
=== Sports ===
- Johnny Johnson (baseball) (1914–1991), Major League pitcher
- Johnny A. Johnson (born 1915, date of death unknown), American Negro leagues baseball player
- Johnny Johnson (footballer) (1921–2003), British footballer
- Johnny Johnson (American football) (born 1968), American football player
- Johnny Johnson III (born 1999), American football player

=== Military ===
- Johnny Johnson (British Army officer) (died 1944), British Army officer
- Johnny Johnson (RAF officer) (1921–2022), last survivor of Operation Chastise
- Harold Keith Johnson (1912–1983), United States Army general

=== Other people ===
- Johnny Johnson (philatelist) (1884–1966), British stamp dealer and philatelist
- Johnny Johnson, headliner of Johnny Johnson and the Bandwagon
- Johnny Allen Johnson (1978 – 2023), convicted child murderer

== Other uses ==
- Johnny Johnson (musical), a 1936 musical by Kurt Weill
- Johnny Johnson, a character on NewsRadio played by Patrick Warburton

== See also ==
- John Johnson (disambiguation)
- Johnnie Johnson (disambiguation)
- Johnny Johnston (disambiguation)
