= Jonathan Johnson =

Jonathan Johnson may refer to:

- Jonathan Johnson (baseball) (born 1974), former Major League Baseball pitcher
- Jonathan Johnson (runner) (born 1982), American middle-distance runner
- Jonathan Johnson (ice hockey) (born 1993), Swedish ice hockey forward
- Jonathan G. A. Johnson (born 1976), Island Governor of Saba
- Jonathan E. Johnson, American business executive
- Jonathan Johnson (politician), Norwegian politician
- Jonathan Eastman Johnson (1824–1906), American painter and co-founder of the Metropolitan Museum of Art
- Jon Johnson (born 1954), American sound editor for feature film and television

== See also ==
- Jon Jonsson (disambiguation)
- John Johnson (disambiguation)
