= Diocese of Lahore =

The Diocese of Lahore may refer to:

- Anglican Diocese of Lahore
- the former Roman Catholic Diocese of Lahore, 1886 until 1994 when it was elevated to an archdiocese
