= Johnny Johnston =

Johnny or Johnnie Johnston is the name of:

- Johnnie Johnston (1915–1996), American actor and singer
- Johnny Johnston (baseball) (1890–1940), American baseball player
- Johnny Johnston (cricketer) (1953–2008), English cricketer
- Johnny Johnston (footballer) (born 1947), Northern Irish footballer
- Johnny Johnston, a member of the British vocal group The Johnston Brothers

== See also ==
- John Johnston (disambiguation)
