= Jake Johnson (disambiguation) =

Jake Johnson is an American actor.

Jake Johnson may also refer to:

- Jake Johnson (American football)
- Jake Johnson (motorcyclist)
- Jake Johnson (Minnesota politician)
- Jake Johnson (North Carolina politician)
- Jake Johnson (racing driver)

== See also ==
- Jack Johnson (disambiguation)
- Jake Johannsen, American comedian
- Jake Jones (footballer), British footballer
