= George Barne (bishop) =

Bishop of Lahore

Right Reverend George Barne CIE OBE

5th Anglican Bishop of Lahore
- In office 1932–1949
- Preceded by: Henry Durant
- Succeeded by: Laurence Woolmer

Personal details
- Born: George Dunsford Barne; 6 May 1879 Jamaica
- Died: 18 June 1954 (aged 75) Hammersmith, London

Military service
- Allegiance: United Kingdom; India
- Branch/service: British Army; British Indian Army
- Rank: Major
- Unit: 1st. (Oxford University) Volunteer Battalion; The Simla Rifles
- Cricket career

Cricket information

Domestic team information
- Years: Team
- 1904: Somerset
- Only First-class: 12 May 1904 Somerset v Oxford University

Umpiring information
- FC umpired: 1 (1933)

Career statistics
Competition	First-class
Matches	1
Runs scored	10
Batting average	10
100s/50s	0/0
Top score	9*
Catches/stumpings	0/–
- Source: CricInfo, 30 August 2009

George Dunsford Barne CIE OBE (6 May 1879 – 18 June 1954) was a Jamaican-born British Anglican priest who was Bishop of Lahore between 1932 and 1949. He was also a cricketer who played for Somerset County Cricket Club.

Educated at Clifton College and Oriel College, Oxford, Barne picked up a single first-class appearance for Somerset against Oxford University in 1904. Somerset lost the match by an innings margin, with Barne picking up one run in the first innings and nine in the second as a tailend batsman. Barne's brothers-in-law, Alexander Streatfeild-Moore and Edward Streatfeild, played first-class cricket in the late 19th century, the former playing county cricket for Kent, the latter for Surrey. In 1933, Barne officiated in a first-class match between Patiala and a touring Marylebone Cricket Club team.

After a short period as a schoolmaster, he was ordained in 1904 and after a curacy at St John the Baptist Summertown, Oxford he became a Missionary in India, eventually rising to be Principal of the Lawrence Royal Military School, Sanawar before appointment to the episcopate. A common room at the Edwardes College Peshawar is named Barnes Room, which he inaugurated in 1938. He was appointed an Officer of the Order of the British Empire in the 1919 New Year Honours. He became a Companion of the Order of the Indian Empire in 1923.

His last post was as Vicar of Harthill, South Yorkshire, although he died in Hammersmith.

Church of England titles
Preceded by Henry Durant	Bishop of Lahore; 1932–1949	Succeeded by Laurence Woolmer
