= Highgate School =

Private school in Highgate, London

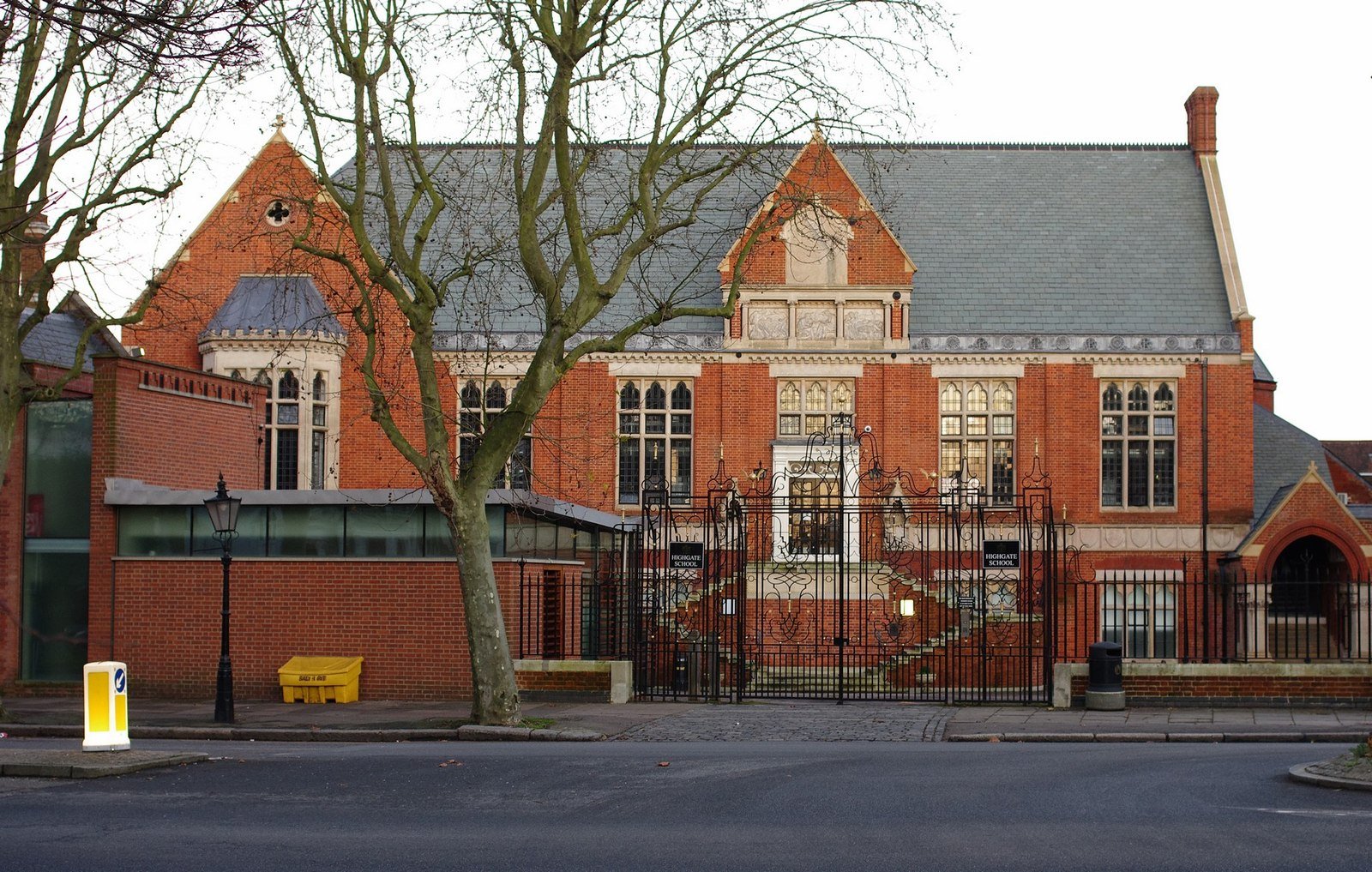

Location
- North Road; Highgate, Greater London, N6 4AY; England; 51.5717°N 0.1493°W

Information
- Type: Public school; Private day school
- Motto: Altiora in Votis; (Latin: 'Higher through prayer')
- Religious affiliation: Church of England
- Established: 1565; 461 years ago
- Founder: Sir Roger Cholmeley
- Local authority: London Borough of Haringey
- Department for Education URN: 102163 Tables
- Head: Adam Pettitt
- Staff: 126 full-time
- Gender: Mixed
- Age: 3 to 18
- Enrolment: 1,456 pupils
- Colours: Maroon, navy
- Alumni: Old Cholmeleians ("OCs")
- Affiliations: HMC, IAPS, Eton Group
- Website: highgateschool.org.uk

Highgate School, formally Sir Roger Cholmeley's School at Highgate, is a co-educational, fee-charging, private day school, founded in 1565 in Highgate, London, England. It educates over 1,400 pupils in three sections – Highgate Pre-Preparatory School (ages 4–8), Highgate Junior School (ages 8–11) and the senior school (11+) – which together comprise the Highgate Foundation. As part of its wider work the charity was from 2010 a founding partner of the London Academy of Excellence and it is now also the principal education sponsor of an associated academy, the London Academy of Excellence Tottenham, which opened in September 2017. The principal business sponsor is Tottenham Hotspur FC. The charity also funds the Chrysalis Partnership, a scheme supporting 26 state schools in six London boroughs.

== Administration ==
The foundation is governed in accordance with a Charity Commission Scheme dated 1 September 2005 (and amended in 2014). Its governing body consists of 16 members; four are nominated (one each by the universities of Oxford and London, by the Bishop of London, and by the Lord Chief Justice), and the rest are co-opted. The Visitor was Queen Elizabeth II (1926–2022). The head is assisted by principals of the pre-prep and junior schools, by deputy heads and a bursar, in managing the foundation. The school is a member of HMC and IAPS and is one of the twelve schools of the Eton Group.

== History ==
Sir Roger Cholmeley, a former Chief Justice and local landowner, decided to found a charitable school "for the good education and instruction of boys and young men" in Highgate and the local parishes. On 27 April 1565 he was granted by Edmund Grindal, the Bishop of London, some land on the site of the old gatehouse to the Bishop's Park and Hermit's Chapel (opposite the Gatehouse Inn, which still exists). A new chapel and buildings for the school and the local curate, who was expected to be the teacher, were built. The chapel also served as a chapel of ease for Highgate residents.

However, by the early nineteenth century a dispute arose because the charity was spending more money, and the curate more time, on the local chapel than on the pupils. A House of Commons commission visited in 1819 and found the master, Samuel Mence, was paying a sexton to teach the boys. In a long and bitter action brought in the High Court against the trustees, it was contended that this was contrary to its founding charitable deed. Lord Chancellor Eldon, in his 1827 judgment, agreed, finding "the charity is for the sustenance and maintenance of a free Grammar school". The trustees were forced to comply and a separate local church for Highgate, St Michael's, was built in South Grove after a successful local appeal. Mence struggled on at the school until 1838 when there were only 19 pupils.

An expansion of the school occurred under the next headmaster John Bradley Dyne (Fellow of Wadham College, Oxford) between 1838 and 1874. Under Dyne, by the 1870s the school had largely dropped free provision for local parish boys and alongside the day places boarding was encouraged for boys from the upper and upper middle classes; fees were introduced and academic standards improved. In the period up to this time the school was known commonly as the Free Grammar School at Highgate, the Highgate Grammar School, or the Cholmeley School. Like other public schools, Highgate followed Arnold at Rugby School in introducing the house system. Also, as at other public schools, Dyne flogged the pupils with a birch rod.

In the 1860s, land was acquired in Bishopswood Road, which provided extensive sports fields and on which several boarding houses and private residences were built. During this period the current chapel and main buildings were erected, designed by Reginald Blomfield (who had also designed Lady Margaret Hall, Oxford). A fragment of the older school building, a gateway with a rusted bell mechanism above between the porter's lodge and the main school building, remained intact until 2006 when the bell was refurbished and the old entrance itself rebuilt in a more modern style. The senior school continues to occupy today the island site in Highgate Village on which it was founded.

When J. A. H. Johnston was appointed as headmaster in 1908, he found a school with a strong focus on a classical education. He created fifth and sixth forms for science, in which the main subjects were chemistry, physics, biology, and astronomy. In 1928 came the opening of a new Science Building by Sir Samuel Hoare, Secretary of State for Air, and Johnston then introduced aeronautics as a school subject, acquiring a Sopwith Snipe and an Avro 504K biplane.

During the Second World War the school's buildings were commandeered by the British government and the school was evacuated to Westward Ho! in Devon, returning to Highgate in 1943.

The poet Samuel Taylor Coleridge was originally buried in the school chapel. In 1961 there was a ceremonial disinterring of Coleridge at which the then Poet Laureate John Masefield spoke, and the remains were reburied at St Michael's parish church just a few hundred yards away.

Until recently the school had two blocks of Eton Fives courts, one structure with ten courts (of which six were built in 1899 and a further four added c. 1913); a second block of eight courts constructed in the 1920s was removed in 2014.

Boarding and weekly boarding at Highgate declined in the years up to the early 1990s, at which time the last boarders left. In 1993 one of the former houses was converted to create the coeducational pre-preparatory school.

In 2001 the school announced its intention to become fully co-educational, ending over four hundred years of single sex education, and girls joined the Senior and Junior schools from 2004. According to the Good Schools Guide, "Its decision to go co-ed has helped to put its popularity and academic standards on upward trajectories".

In January 2013, the Charter Building was opened by former pupil and governor Lord Hill.

In May 2014, the Sir Martin Gilbert Library was opened by former Prime Minister Gordon Brown.

In 2015, the school celebrated its 450th anniversary and in January 2015 a museum opened, which can be visited by the public on Saturday mornings in term-time.

In September 2016, a new building for the junior school opened.

== Sexual abuse allegations ==
In March 2021, current and former pupils of the school published an open letter to the governors, evidencing the school's 'systematic failure' to address sexual abuse committed by Highgate pupils or on Highgate property. The letter referenced hundreds of anonymous allegations of harassment, assault, and rape against former and current pupils, asserted that male students at Highgate School had a widespread reputation for such behaviour and alleged that students had been 'silenced' by the school administration. Year 11, 12 and 13 pupils staged a classroom walkout to mark the report. Later the same week the school announced an independent investigation into rape culture at the school, by a panel chaired by Dame Anne Rafferty, the former Lady Justice of Appeal. Her subsequent report along with a safeguarding review carried out by the London Borough of Haringey stated that the school's policies met statutory requirements and that a large majority of alleged incidents took place outside the school. In addition, both reports reflected on the contrasting responses from interviews with pupils and parents. Rafferty stated: "It is striking that no one in the school community recognises the Highgate on Everyone's Invited as the school they attend or to which they send their children or at which they work." The school announced a range of policy reviews including an Anti-Sexism and Sexual Violence Plan along with implementing Rafferty's recommendation of appointing a dedicated Director of Safeguarding.

== Houses ==
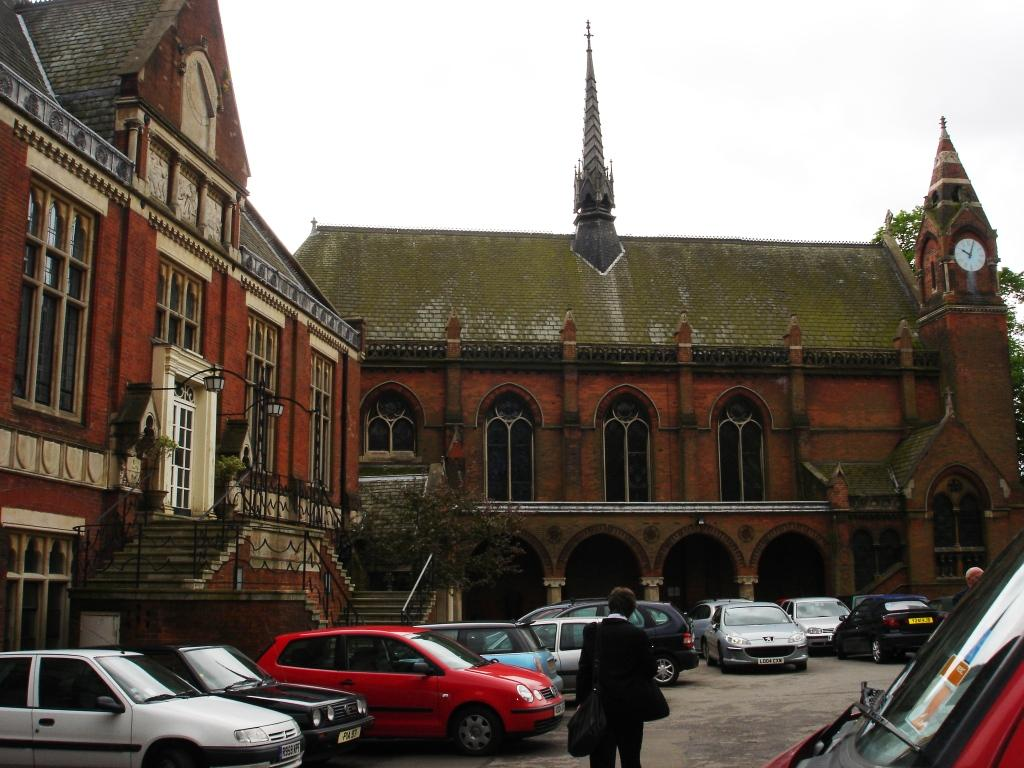
Chapel Quad, with "Big School" on the left, and the chapel

The school operates a house system like many other public schools and upon reaching year 9, pupils are placed in a house. These houses are Northgate, Southgate, Westgate, Eastgate, Queensgate, Kingsgate, Midgate, Fargate, Heathgate, The Lodge, School House and Grindal. This system, which Dyne, like other public school headmasters, copied from Arnold's at Rugby School, was established to create "house spirit" among the students, allowing for both academic and sporting competitions among the houses. Some of these, like School House, Grindal and The Lodge used to be boarding houses. However, other houses, such as Kingsgate, are newer, having been created by a disaffected group of Westgateans in the 1970s.

== Head masters ==
The title "Head" has been used since March 2015.

- 1571–1580 Johnson Charle
- 1580–1586 Edward Smythe
- 1586–1589 William Becket
- 1589–1592 Christopher Goffe
- 1592–1593 John Williams
- 1593–1599 Ralph Williams
- 1599–1609 Abdias Tuer
- 1609–1615 John Mann
- 1615–1625 John Bright
- 1625–1639 John Ridley
- 1639–1644 Thomas Carter (ejected)
- 1644–1645 Christopher Laurence
- 1645–1659 George Marsden
- 1659–1659 – Chamberlaine
- 1659–1660 Benoni Barke
- 1660–1670 Thomas Carter (restored)
- 1670–1670 Joseph Gwillym
- 1670–1670 Richard Bestwick
- 1670–1673 Ellis Price
- 1673–1677 John Seely
- 1677–1680 Robert King
- 1680–1686 Robert Peirce
- 1686–1694 Thomas Brown
- 1694–1699 Peter Cook
- 1699–1699 John Cole
- 1699–1712 W. M. Chapman
- 1712–1712 Henry Mills
- 1712–1728 John Browne
- 1728–1733 Thomas Horton
- 1733–1746 Bexworth Liptrott
- 1746–1780 William Felton
- 1780–1793 William Porter
- 1793–1816 Thomas Bennett
- 1816–1838 Samuel Mence
- 1838–1874 John Bradley Dyne
- 1874–1893 Charles McDowall
- 1893–1908 Arthur Edmund Allcock
- 1908–1936 John Alexander Hope Johnston
- 1936–1954 Geoffrey Foxall Bell
- 1954–1974 Alfred John Farre Doulton
- 1974–1989 Roy Curtis Giles
- 1989–2006 Richard Paul Kennedy
- 2006– Adam Sven Pettitt

== Notable members of staff ==
With year of joining

- Andrew (Zbigniew) Szydlo (1975) chemist and biographer
- Ed Doolan (1967), radio broadcaster
- Anthony Cooke (1955) organist and composer
- Adrian Berg (1955) landscape painter
- Alan Palmer (1951) historian and author
- Sir Kyffin Williams RA (1944) artist
- Sir Daniel Pettit (1939) industrialist and England footballer
- Sir Robert Stopford (1924) Bishop of London, Chaplain to The Queen
- Howard Fabian (1932) footballer (also OC)
- Frank Sandon (1921) statistician and Olympic swimmer
- John Metcalfe (1920) novelist
- T. S. Eliot (1916) Nobel prize winning poet, dramatist and literary critic
- Albert Knight (1913) England cricketer
- Kenneth Hunt (1908) footballer and Olympic gold medallist
- Sir Richard Terry (1895) musicologist
- Charles Marriott (1892) Rugby Union international and administrator
- Graham Wallas (1885) socialist and founder of the Fabian Society
- Stephen Newton (1876) cricketer
- William Grylls Adams (1864) professor of astronomy
- Richard Watson Dixon (1861) poet, correspondent of Gerard Manley Hopkins
- Charles Burney (1781) book collector and scholar
- Francis Cunningham Woods (1896) composer and organist

== Notable alumni ==
Former pupils of Highgate School are called Cholmeleians or Old Cholmeleians ("OCs"), after Sir Roger Cholmeley. The alumni are organised as the Cholmeleian Society, founded as the Old Cholmeleian Club in 1893, although annual dinners had been held since 1859. Both the School and the Society organise social events, and a magazine, The Cholmeleian, is published twice a year. Notable Cholmeleians include:

=== Arts, design and literature ===
- Hugh Aldersey-Williams, author and journalist
- Owen Barfield, philosopher and writer
- Sir John Betjeman, Poet Laureate, taught by T. S. Eliot
- Sir Reginald Blomfield, architect
- Hussein Chalayan, fashion designer
- Marcus Clarke, Australian novelist and poet
- Ernest Hartley Coleridge, literary scholar, grandson of Samuel Taylor Coleridge
- Henry Fairlie, journalist and broadcaster
- Vivian Hunter Galbraith, historian
- Sir Martin Gilbert, historian and biographer of Sir Winston Churchill
- Anthony Green, artist
- Francis Llewellyn Griffith, Egyptologist
- Ernest Hardy, classicist and Principal of Jesus College, Oxford
- Gerard Hoffnung, cartoonist and musician
- Richard Rivington Holmes, archivist, Royal librarian and archaeologist
- Gerard Manley Hopkins, poet
- Anthony Howard, journalist and editor
- Peter Kingsley, writer on ancient Greek culture
- Charles Lee, novelist
- Archibald Marshall, author, publisher and journalist
- James Augustus Cotter Morison, essayist and historian
- Don Newman, Canadian journalist and broadcaster
- Mike Ockrent, theatre director
- Alfred Chilton Pearson, classical scholar
- H. G. Pelissier, theatrical producer and satirist
- Patrick Procktor, artist
- Graham Reynolds, art historian
- Sir Charles Robertson, historian and vice-chancellor; tutor to HM King Edward VIII
- Nicholas Rowe (1674–1718), Poet Laureate and dramatist
- Geoffrey Scott, architectural historian
- Howard Hayes Scullard, historian, editor of the Oxford Classical Dictionary
- Martin Seymour-Smith, poet and biographer
- Walter William Skeat, philologist
- Ion Trewin, publisher, editor and biographer
- Arthur Graeme West, war poet
- Nigel Williams, author, screenwriter and playwright
- Philip Stanhope Worsley, translator of the Odyssey and Iliad
- Allan G. Wyon, die-engraver, sculptor and medallist
- Edmund Yates, journalist and author
- Henry Zeffman, political journalist

=== Business and commerce ===
- Piers Adam, nightclub and restaurant entrepreneur
- Peter Austin, brewer
- Sir Edward Beauchamp, MP and chairman of Lloyd's
- David Buchler, corporate recovery and restructuring expert
- Victor Chandler, founder of BetVictor
- Sir Robert Clark, company chairman and SOE officer
- Sir Ronald Grierson, industrialist
- Sir Arthur Hetherington, chairman of British Gas
- Sir Percy Graham MacKinnon, chairman of Lloyd's
- Michael Payne, marketing executive for the IOC and Formula 1
- Bernard Shapero, dealer in antiquarian rare books and works on paper
- Sir Alexander Valentine, chairman of London Transport Executive and London Transport Board

=== Classical music ===
- John Blakely, pianist
- Alan Bush, composer
- John Hawkins, composer
- Gerard Hoffnung, tubist
- Daniel Hope, violinist
- Jan Latham-Koenig, conductor
- Milton Mermikides, composer and academic
- John Rutter, composer
- Howard Shelley, pianist
- Henry Smart, organist and composer
- Sir John Tavener, composer
- Graham Waterhouse, cellist and composer
- Peter Wright, organist

=== Film, stage and television ===
- Richard Attree, film and TV composer, formerly with BBC Radiophonic Workshop
- Richard Bebb, actor
- John Box, Oscar winning film production designer and art director
- Roland Culver, actor
- Donald Eccles, actor
- Robin Ellis, actor
- John Forrest, actor
- Matthew Garber, actor
- Philip Harben, TV chef
- Freddie Highmore, actor
- Tom Hooper, Oscar winning film director
- John Leyton, actor and singer
- Adrian Lyne, film director
- Christopher Morahan, theatre, television and film director
- Robert Nisbet, TV correspondent and presenter
- Barry Norman, film critic
- Kayvan Novak, actor and comedian
- Lloyd Owen, actor
- Geoffrey Palmer, actor
- Robin Ray, broadcaster and musician
- Paul Rotha, documentary film maker
- Gregg Sulkin, actor
- Harry Thompson, TV writer and producer
- Murray Walker, motorsport commentator

=== Law ===
- Lord Ackner, Law Lord
- Sir Richard Arnold, Court of Appeal Judge
- Sir Archibald Bodkin, Director of Public Prosecutions
- Sir Roy Goode, academic lawyer
- Sir Maurice Gwyer, Chief Justice of India
- Sir George Hayes, High Court Judge
- Sir Frank MacKinnon, Court of Appeal Judge
- Michael Mansfield, barrister
- Brian Neill, Court of Appeal Judge
- Lord Neill of Bladen, barrister, Vice-Chancellor of Oxford University, Warden of All Souls College, Oxford
- Sir Anthony Plowman, Vice-Chancellor of the Chancery Division
- Thomas Sargant, law reformer and human rights campaigner

=== Military ===
- Bill Bailey, mine clearance expert, awarded George Medal and Bar
- General Joyanta N. Chaudhuri, Commander-in-Chief, Indian Army
- Lieutenant Colonel 'Pug' Davis, co-founder of the Special Boat Service
- Admiral Frank Finnis
- George Goodman, flying ace and one of "The Few"
- Brigadier General Sir William Horwood, chief commissioner of the Metropolitan Police
- General Sir Edward Pemberton Leach, awarded the Victoria Cross in the 2nd Afghan War
- Lieutenant General Sir Michael Rimington, HQ Staff, Indian Cavalry Corps
- Vice Admiral Sir Guy Sayer
- Air Marshal Sir Anthony Selway, Air Officer Commanding at RAF Coastal Command

=== Politics and public service ===
- Robert Aickman, writer and campaigner for inland waterways
- Sir Frank Alexander, Lord Mayor of London
- Sir Robert Atkins, Conservative MP & MEP
- Sir Charles Batho, Lord Mayor of London
- Peter Beazley, Conservative MEP
- Sir Harold Beeley, diplomat
- Lord Bowles, Labour MP & Peer
- William Burdett-Coutts, Conservative MP and philanthropist
- Sir Andrew Burns, diplomat
- David Burrowes, Conservative MP
- Charles Clarke, Labour MP, Home Secretary
- Sir John Cockburn, Premier of South Australia
- Sir Marriott Cooke, mental health superintendent, Commissioner in Lunacy
- Anthony Crosland, Labour MP, Foreign Secretary
- John Bowen Elcum, colonial administrator
- Sir George Epps, actuary, on Beveridge Commission creating the welfare state
- Sir Martin Furnival Jones, director general of MI5
- Lord Garner, head of the diplomatic service, High Commissioner to Canada
- Robert Halfon, Conservative MP, Cabinet minister
- Lord Hill, Conservative Peer, Leader of the Lords
- Sir Ian Horobin, Conservative MP
- Bernard Jenkin, Conservative MP
- Howard Johnson, Conservative MP
- Jon Lansman, Labour Party activist
- Jeremy Lefroy, Conservative MP
- R. C. Lehmann, Liberal MP, editor of Punch
- Harry Maude, anthropologist and South Pacific administrator
- Sir Walter Maude, civil servant in India
- Lord Mitford, Liberal Democrat Peer
- Sir Wyndham Murray, Conservative MP
- Sir Robert Price, Liberal MP
- Thomas Phillips Price, Liberal MP
- Sir Robert Scott, governor of Mauritius
- Sir Geoffrey Shakespeare, Liberal MP
- Duncan Taylor, diplomat
- Sir Charles Thomas-Stanford, Conservative MP
- Sir Stanley Tubbs, Conservative MP
- Sir Colin Turner, Conservative MP

=== Popular music ===
- Johnny Borrell of Razorlight
- John Hassall of the Libertines/Yeti
- Crispian Mills of Kula Shaker
- Jon Moss of Culture Club
- Natty
- Aubrey Nunn of Faithless
- DJ Pearson Sound
- Christian Smith of Stony Sleep and Razorlight
- Zak Starkey, son of Ringo Starr and drummer for The Who
- Orlando Weeks of the Maccabees
- DJ Yoda

=== Religion ===
- Edward Bickersteth, Bishop of South Tokyo
- Stanley Booth-Clibborn, Bishop of Manchester
- Philip Buckler, Dean of Lincoln
- Kenneth Clements, Bishop of Canberra and Goulburn
- Henry Durrant, Bishop of Lahore
- William George Hardie, Archbishop of the West Indies
- Arthur Kitching, Bishop on the Upper Nile
- Thomas Savage, Bishop of Zululand
- Ernest Thorold, chaplain to Kings George V, Edward VIII, and George VI
- Norman Tubbs, Bishop of Tinnevelly and of Rangoon and Dean of Chester
- Cyril Tucker, Bishop in Argentina and Eastern South America
- Charles Turner, Bishop of Islington
- Edward Waller, Bishop of Madras

=== Science and engineering ===
- David Acheson, mathematician
- Sir Christopher Andrewes, discovered the influenza A virus
- Alan Blumlein, inventor and electronics engineer
- Alex Comfort, author of The Joy of Sex
- Frederick Dixey, entomologist
- Richard M. Durbin, computational biologist
- John Ellis, theoretical physicist
- Sir Douglas Fox, president of the Institution of Civil Engineers
- Sir Francis Fox, civil engineer
- Walter Gaskell, physiologist
- Leslie Grinsell, archaeologist
- Sir Roger Hetherington, president of the Institution of Civil Engineers
- Roger le Geyt Hetherington, president of the Institution of Civil Engineers
- David Keynes Hill, biophysicist
- Maurice Hill, marine geophysicist
- Alfred John Jukes-Browne, palaeontologist
- Alexander King, pioneer of sustainable development
- Sir Allan Quartermaine, president of the Institution of Civil Engineers
- Warwick W. Sawyer, mathematician and author
- Sir Clive Sinclair, inventor of the 'slim-line' electronic pocket calculator
- Sir Arthur Tansley FRS, botanist and ecologist
- John Venn, creator of Venn diagrams
- John Webb, paediatrician
- Paul Weindling, historian of medicine
- Errol White, president of the Linnean Society of London
- Guy Alfred Wyon, pathologist
- John Zarnecki, space scientist

=== Sport ===
- Gordon Crole-Rees, Davis Cup tennis player
- George Docker, cricketer
- Colin Drybrough, cricketer
- David Hays, cricketer
- Thomas Bridges Hughes, two FA Cup winner's medals for Wanderers FC 1876 and 1877
- Wally Kahn, gliding champion
- William Knightley-Smith, cricketer
- Douglas Lowe, double Olympic gold medallist
- Jamie Powe, played a single first-class university cricket match and scored 11 runs
- Walter Robins, England cricket captain
- Stuart Rogers, cricketer
- William Seagrove, double Olympic silver medallist
- Robert Stuart, Argentine cricketer
- Phil Tufnell, England cricketer, TV personality
- Graham Walker, motorcycle racer and broadcaster
- Robert Warton, England cricket team manager and umpire
- Tagge Webster, president of MCC and England amateur footballer
- Amin Zahir, Olympic fencer
