= William Knightley-Smith =

English cricketer

Personal information
- Born: 1 August 1932; West Smithfield, London, England
- Died: 31 July 1962 (aged 29); Edinburgh, Scotland
- Batting: Left-handed
- Role: Batsman

Domestic team information
- Years: Team
- 1952: Middlesex
- 1953–1955: Cambridge University
- 1955–1957: Gloucestershire

Career statistics
Competition	FC
Matches	87
Runs scored	2530
Batting average	17.44
100s/50s	0/11
Top score	95
Balls bowled	41
Wickets	0
Bowling average	–
5 wickets in innings	0
10 wickets in match	0
Best bowling	–
Catches/stumpings	30/–
- Source: Cricinfo, 24 June 2020

William Knightley-Smith (1 August 1932 – 31 July 1962) was an English amateur cricketer who played first-class cricket between 1952 and 1961.

== Life and career ==
Bill Knightley-Smith was educated at Highgate School in North London, where he was captain of the cricket, football and fives teams. After Highgate he went to St John's College, Cambridge, where he won blues for cricket and football.

He played a full season for Middlesex in 1952 and was awarded his county cap, then played for Cambridge University from 1953 to 1955, and for Gloucestershire, where he was also Assistant Secretary, from 1955 to 1957. His highest first-class score was 95, the highest score in the match, for Cambridge against Essex in 1955.

Knightley-Smith left first-class cricket after the 1957 season to take a teaching position at Highgate, his old school. He later became an insurance executive in Liverpool and Edinburgh. He collapsed and died on the eve of his 30th birthday while playing tennis in Edinburgh.
