= Howard Fabian =

English footballer and cricketer

Personal information
- Full name: Aubrey Howard Fabian
- Date of birth: 20 March 1909
- Place of birth: East Finchley, England
- Date of death: 26 September 1984 (aged 75)
- Position: Inside forward

Senior career*
Years	Team	Apps	(Gls)
- Cambridge University
1930–1938	Corinthian	77	(29)
1931–1933	Derby County	12	(1)
1931–1939	Casuals	124	(40)
1934–1935	Fulham		
- Corinthian-Casuals
- Old Cholmeleians

International career
1931–1933	England amateur	6	(2)
- * Club domestic league appearances and goals

Aubrey Howard Fabian (20 March 1909 – 26 September 1984) was an English amateur sportsman who played both football and cricket.

== Early life ==
Born in East Finchley, Fabian was educated at Highgate School and Pembroke College, Cambridge, earning a blue at Cambridge for both football and cricket.

== Career ==
=== Football career ===
Fabian made regular appearances for amateur teams Corinthian and Casuals throughout the 1930s. He played in Casuals 1936 FA Amateur Cup Final winning team and is in the top 20 Casuals all time appearance makers. In 1939, he joined the newly merged team of Corinthian-Casuals and played for Old Cholmeleians, the 'Old Boys Team' of Highgate School; he also earned six caps for the England amateurs.

Fabian also played in the Football League for Derby County, joining them from Cambridge University in December 1931, and making his debut on 20 February 1932. He made a total of 12 appearances in the Football League for Derby County, scoring 1 goal; he also scored 2 goals in 4 FA Cup matches for them. His final appearance for Derby County was on 22 April 1933. In the 1934–35 season he was registered with Fulham.

=== Cricket career ===
Howard Fabian
Personal information
- Full name: Aubrey Howard Fabian
- Born: 20 March 1909; East Finchley, England
- Died: 26 September 1984 (aged 75)
- Bowling: Slow-medium
- Role: Bowler

Domestic team information
- Years: Team
- 1929–1931: Cambridge University

Career statistics
Competition	First-class
Matches	35
Runs scored	763
Batting average	26.31
100s/50s	–/3
Top score	76
Balls bowled	4694
Wickets	61
Bowling average	37.37
5 wickets in innings	2
10 wickets in match	–
Best bowling	8–69
Catches/stumpings	22/–
- Source: Cricket Archive, 6 February 2017

Fabian was as a slow-medium bowler and played three seasons of first-class cricket for Cambridge University between 1929 and 1931, including the Varsity Match at Lord's each year. His best figures were 8–69 against Yorkshire in 1930.

=== Eton Fives ===
Fabian was also an accomplished Eton Fives player, winning the Kinnaird Cup – the National Amateur Championships – four times, in 1930 with Javier Aguirre and in 1937, 1939 and 1948 with John Webb.
