= Jon Jonsson =

Jon Jonsson, Jon Jönsson, or Jón Jónsson may refer to:

- Jón Jónsson, disappeared shortly after arriving in Ireland in 2019, Icelandic poker player
- Jon Jönsson (born 1983), Swedish footballer
- Jon Jonsson (model) (1982-2025), Icelandic model, winner of 2004 TV series Manhunt
- Jón Jónsson (born 1985), Icelandic singer, songwriter, and footballer
- Jón Jónsson (water polo) (1908-1973), Icelandic water polo player

== See also ==
- Jon Jonsson i Källeräng (1867–1939), Swedish politician
- Jón Sveinbjørn Jónsson (1955–2008), Icelandic/Norwegian poet, children's writer, and translator
- John Jonsson, mayor of Dallas, Texas
- Jonathan Johnson (disambiguation)
- John Johnson (disambiguation)
