= John Bowen Elcum =

British colonial administrator

- Born: 18 November 1860
- Died: 28 November 1945 (aged 85); Truro
- Education: Highgate School, London, and Queen's College, Oxford
- Occupations: Colonial administrator, British Malaya
- Years active: 1884-1916
- Spouse: Ethel Harriet
- Children: 3

John Bowen Elcum (18 November 1860 – 28 November 1945) was a British colonial administrator. He was Director of Education for the Straits Settlements and the Federated Malay States from 1906 to 1916.

== Early life ==
Elcum was born on 18 November 1860, son of Hugh William Elcum, solicitor, and was educated at Highgate School, London, and Queen's College, Oxford.

== Career ==
In 1884, he enrolled as a cadet in the Straits Settlements, and was appointed Acting District Officer in South Malacca, Province Wellesley and Dindings having passed the Malay language examination. In 1892, he was District Officer in Bukit Mertajam and the following year was appointed Sheriff in Penang.

In 1893, he moved to Singapore where he took up various positions including Acting Sheriff, Acting Collector of Land Revenue, Inspector of Prisons, and Official Assignee and Registrar of Deeds.

In 1898, he began working in the education sector, where he would remain for the rest of his career, beginning with an appointment as Inspector of Schools for the Straits Settlements, which title was changed to Director of Public Instruction in 1901. In 1906, the Education Departments of the Straits Settlements and the Federated Malay States were amalgamated and Elcum was appointed to head the new department where he remained as Director of Education until his retirement.

Briefly, from 1911–12, he combined his position as Director with that of Acting Advisor to the Sultan of Johor in the absence of Douglas Graham Campbell, and in 1914, he was appointed as a member of the Singapore Legislative Council. He retired in 1916 due to illness.

As Director of Education for ten years, his reports, which were published annually, provide an authoritative account of the state of education in British Malaya at the beginning of the 20th century. A recurring issue which he raised in his reports was the poor state of women's education amongst the Chinese, and especially the Malays. In his report for 1913, he noted that school attendance by boys was on average five times greater than for girls. He added: "The girls' schools continue to be unsatisfactory. They are small and inefficient and as a rule girls only attend for a year or so, and indeed very few reach the upper classes."

== Personal life ==
Elcum's wife, Ethel Harriet, died in 1914, and they had three daughters, Jane, Eunice and Gwen. Elcum died on 28 November 1945, aged 85, at Truro, Cornwall.
