= Corhampton and Meonstoke =

Civil parish in Hampshire, England

Coordinates: 50°58′40″N 1°07′53″W

- Location within Hampshire
- Population: 759 (2011 Census)
- District: City of Winchester
- Shire county: Hampshire
- Region: South East
- Country: England
- Sovereign state: United Kingdom
- Post town: WINCHESTER
- Postcode district: SO32
- Dialling code: 01489
- Police: Hampshire and Isle of Wight
- Fire: Hampshire and Isle of Wight
- Ambulance: South Central
- UK Parliament: Winchester

Corhampton and Meonstoke is a civil parish in the English county of Hampshire forming part of the area administered as the City of Winchester. It comprises the villages of Corhampton and Meonstoke.

== History ==
The parish was formed on 1 April 1932 from the parishes of "Corhampton" and "Meonstoke".
