= Johnnie Johnson =

Johnnie Johnson may refer to:

- Johnnie Johnson (RAF officer, born 1915) (1915–2001), Royal Air Force Second World War II flying ace and air vice-marshal
- Johnnie Johnson (RAF officer, born 1917) (1917–2009), English Royal Air Force air vice-marshal and cricketer
- Johnnie Johnson (musician) (1924–2005), American pianist and blues musician
- Johnnie Johnson (American football) (born 1956), American football cornerback and safety
- Johnnie Johnson Jr. (born 1942), first black chief of police for Birmingham, Alabama.

== See also ==
- Johnny Johnson (disambiguation)
- John Johnson (disambiguation)
