= John Johnsen =

John Johnsen may refer to:

- John Johnsen (swimmer) (1892–1984), Norwegian swimmer
- John Johnsen (footballer) (1895–1969), Norwegian international footballer

== See also ==
- John Johnson (disambiguation)
- J. Erik Jonsson (1901–1995), co-founder and former president of Texas Instruments Incorporated
