= John Johnstone =

John Johnstone may refer to:

== Politics ==
- John Johnstone (mayor) (1661–1732), mayor of New York, 1714–1719
- Sir John Johnstone, 1st Baronet (died 1711), Scottish army officer and politician
- John Johnstone (East India Company) (1734–1795), officer of the British East India Company, MP for Dysart Burghs 1774–80
- Sir John Johnstone, 6th Baronet (1783–1811), British army officer and politician
- John Heywood Johnstone (1850–1904), British barrister and Conservative Party politician
- John Johnstone (Australian politician) (1857–1931), member of the Victorian Legislative Assembly
- John Philemon Johnstone (1873–1960), member of the Ontario Legislative Assembly

== Sports ==
- Jock Johnstone (fl. 1920s), Scottish footballer for Aston Villa
- John Johnstone (athlete) (1892–1969), American Olympic track and field high jumper
- John Johnstone (English footballer), English footballer for Port Vale
- John Johnstone (footballer, born 1869) (1869–1953), Scottish footballer (Kilmarnock FC and Scotland)
- John Johnstone (baseball) (born 1968), American professional baseball player

== Other ==
- John Johnstone (physician) (1768–1836), British doctor and biographer
- John Henry Johnstone (1749–1828), Irish actor and singer
- John Johnstone (architect) (1818–1884), Scottish architect
- John Johnstone (businessman) (1881–1935), British businessman and jockey
- John Young Johnstone, Canadian Impressionist painter

== See also ==
- John Johnston (disambiguation)
- John Hope-Johnstone (disambiguation)
