= John Hawkins (English composer) =

English composer

John Bernard Hawkins (born 1949) is an English composer of chamber, vocal and orchestral music.

Hawkins was born in Enfield and educated at Highgate School. He initially studied denistry at Guy's Hospital but left to join the book publisher Thames & Hudson, where he worked in production and design for 40 years. A music course at City Lit in London led to private study in composition with Malcolm Williamson and Elisabeth Lutyens.

On the recommendation of conductor Sir Charles Mackerras the Marine Society commissioned Hawkins to compose his Sea Symphony for the UK's National Martime Year in 1982. It received its first broadcast performance by the Bournemouth Symphony Orchestra, conducted by Uri Segal, on 30 December, 1982. Hawkins went on to complete a large-scale sea trilogy, including the song cycle Voices from the Sea, for soloist and string orchestra, first performed by Martyn Hill with the Divertimenti string orchestra at St John Smith Square on 3 April 1985, and The Seafarer (1986) for tenor, choir and chamber orchestra.

The largest of his choral pieces is This World (1994), for choir and two trumpets. It is one of many works by Hawkins drawing texts or inspiration from William Blake. His interest in Blake began when he worked with the poet and Blake scholar Kathleen Raine on her book The Human Face of God: William Blake and the Book of Job, published by Thames & Hudson in 1982. The work was commissioned by the choir Cryes of London and first broadcast by the BBC Singers in 1989. Other Blake inspired pieces include Urizen (1983, after Blake's The Book of Urizen) - a virtuoso piece for viola and piano that has received multiple performances worldwide - the song cycle Portions of Eternity (2020), the string quartet Fuzon (2012), and the piano quartet Blake Visions (1983). The one-act opera Echoes was commissioned as part of Covent Garden’s Garden Venture scheme and first performed at the Riverside Studios in 1991.

Hawkins is married with three children. He lived in London before moving to Lewes, East Sussex in 2015. He is a member of the New Music Brighton composer's group.

== Selected works ==
- Blake Visions, piano quartet (1983)
- Both Beauties: four poems about music, song cycle (1976)
- Brief Encounters for flute and viola
- Clarinet Concerto (1972)
- Clarinet Sonata (1969-1972)
- Cortège? for violin and piano
- Disturbed Nights for solo flute
- Echoes, one act opera (1991)
- Fuzon, two movements for string quartet (2012)
- Gestures for two violas (1998)
- Grounds for oboe and string orchestra
- In Touch, trio for clarinet, cello and piano (2016)
- Looking Back for violin and piano
- Lost in Translation for piano
- Orc: Toccata for two violins
- Portions of Eternity, song cycle for soprano and piano
- Quietus for string trio
- The Seafarer, for tenor, choir and chamber orchestra (1986)
- Sea Symphony (1982)
- Seven into Eight for string quartet
- Shadows for viola, double bass, and piano
- Simplicius Simplicissimus for voice and clarinet (2018)
- Sonata Serenata for flute and piano
- Strange Bridge: three poems by Edward Thomas, song cycle (fp. 2025)
- Stranger, Lover, Dancer for solo cello
- This World for choir and trumpets (1994, BBC Singers)
- Threnody for string orchestra
- Urizen for viola and piano (or string orchestra) (1983)
- Variations for piano
- Voices from the Sea for tenor and string orchestra (1985)
- Waiting: Tango for viola and double bass
- Worlds Apart for double bass and piano

Recordings

- Blake Visions, Claudio Records CC6062 (2026)
- Invocations: Contemporary viola works, Black Box BBM1058 (2001)
- Simplicius: music for clarinet, Claudia Records CC6045 (2019)
- Voices from the Sea, Meridian CDE84496 (2005)
