= Meonstoke =

Village and parish in Hampshire, England

Coordinates: 50.978754°N 1.127423°W

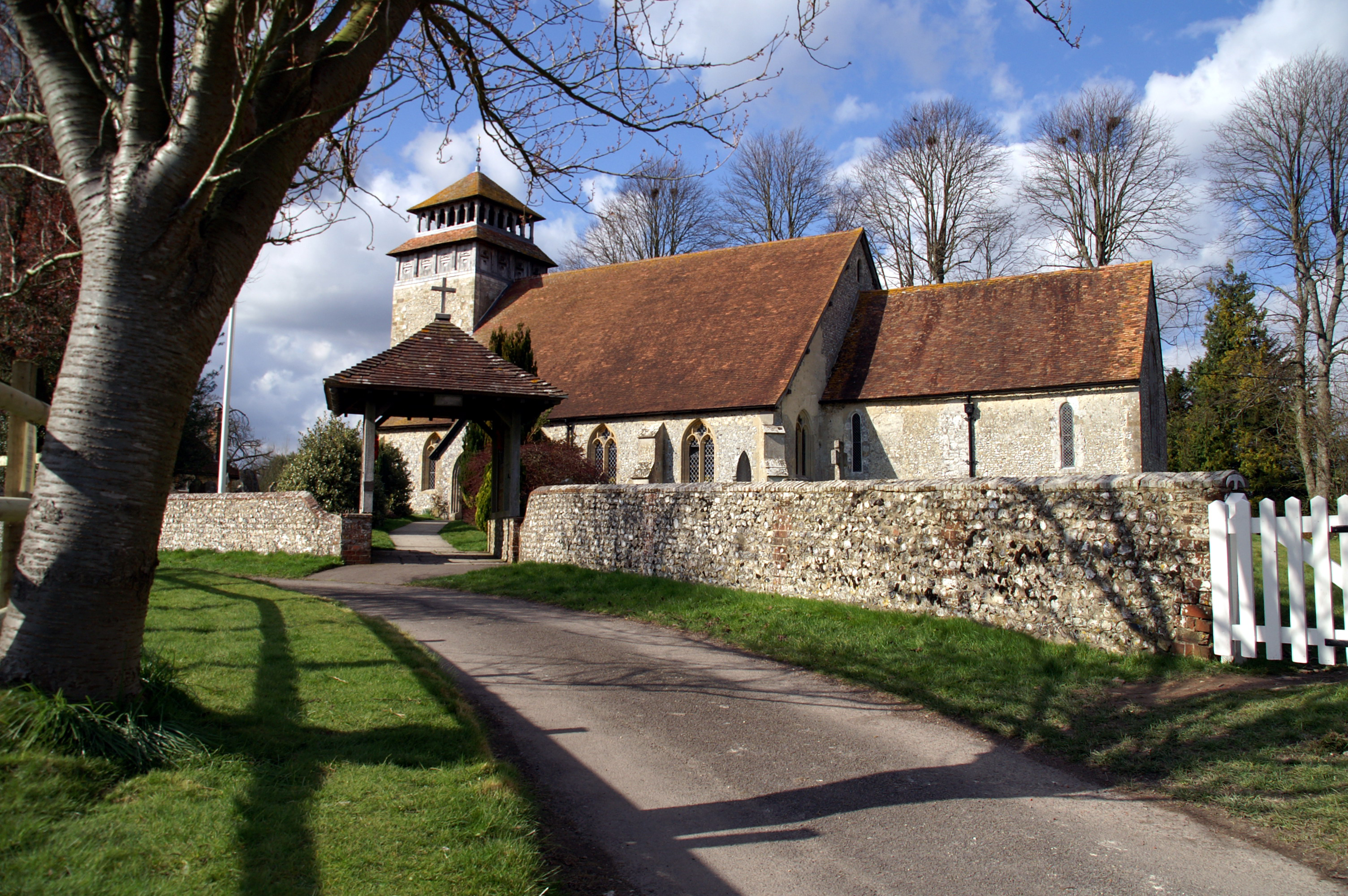
- St Andrew's church, Meonstoke

- Location within Hampshire
- OS grid reference: SU612203
- Civil parish: Corhampton and Meonstoke
- District: City of Winchester
- Shire county: Hampshire
- Region: South East
- Country: England
- Sovereign state: United Kingdom
- Post town: SOUTHAMPTON
- Postcode district: SO32
- Dialling code: 01489
- Police: Hampshire and Isle of Wight
- Fire: Hampshire and Isle of Wight
- Ambulance: South Central
- UK Parliament: Winchester
- Website: Corhampton & Meonstoke Parish Council

Meonstoke is a village and former civil parish, now in the parish of Corhampton and Meonstoke, in the Winchester district, in the county of Hampshire, England. It is in the Meon Valley where it cuts through the Middle Chalk of the South Downs, Old Winchester Hill is at the edge of the parish to the east. In 1931 the parish had a population of 439.

It sits on the eastern bank of the River Meon. On the northern part of the western bank is Corhampton. The A32 crosses the river between the two villages. On the southern bank is Droxford. Soberton lies to the south, Hambledon to the east and Exton to the north.

== History ==
Flint implements found near Old Winchester Hill suggest that the area that is now the parish of Meonstoke was inhabited over 20,000 years ago. Later, in Neolithic times a roadway developed along the South Downs, passing south of Old Winchester Hill and crossing the River Meon at Exton. There is a Neolithic stone barrow on the southern slopes of Old Winchester Hill. Also on the Hill are eight Bronze Age barrows. Old Winchester Hill is the site of one of a chain of five Iron Age forts along the South Hampshire Ridgeway.

Roman remains have been found in the Meon Valley and during the 1980s, archaeologists uncovered parts of a Roman building in the village. Sections of the building's façade are now on display in the British Museum.

The Meonwara, a Jutish tribe settled in the Meon Valley in the 6th century, but the stoke in the village's name is of Anglo-Saxon origin.

It is possible that Borough English or ultimogeniture the tradition of inheritance by the last-born of a parent's estate, which was recorded in the village as late as 1801, began with the Meonwara.

Menestoche is mentioned in the Domesday Book of 1086, with 28 heads of families listed, suggesting a possible population of 140.

In the 13th century, Meonstoke was granted a weekly market, suggesting the importance of the village at the time.

A national school was built in the village in 1842.

The former Meon Valley Railway passed to the east of the village but the planned station and yard at Meonstoke were never built. The route is now the Meon Valley Railway Line Trail, which can be joined here.

The singer/songwriter Frank Turner comes from Meonstoke. He mentions the area in his song "To Take You Home" on the album Love Ire & Song.

On 1 April 1932 the parish was abolished and merged with Corhampton to form "Corhampton and Meonstoke".

== Architecture ==
Meonstoke has many sites with a historic Listing, including the Grade II listed Church of St Andrew which mainly dates from the 13th century, with a later tower, probably 15th century with early 20th-century repairs. These included the addition in 1906 of a memorial window by Mary Lowndes, a leading light in the Arts and Crafts Movement.

A church was mentioned in the Domesday Book, but the first mention of a rector is found in 1262. Rectors of the parish have included: Thomas Chaundler, Christopher Bainbridge, Lawrence Humphrey, John Harris and Laurence Henry Woolmer.

The Grade II Listed Meonstoke House is described as "Late C18, with mid C19 extensions at each side...[and a] C20 porch of classical style". A June 2020 report provided more specifics, some years after a restoration: "The house was built in the late 18th century, with north and south wings added half-way through the 20th century. .. The exterior is effortlessly Georgian, the interiors have been sympathetically modernised". The large greenhouse also appears to be of a Georgian style. The property, with 34 acres of gardens and paddocks, was sold in 2020.
