= George Lefroy =

Bishop and missionary

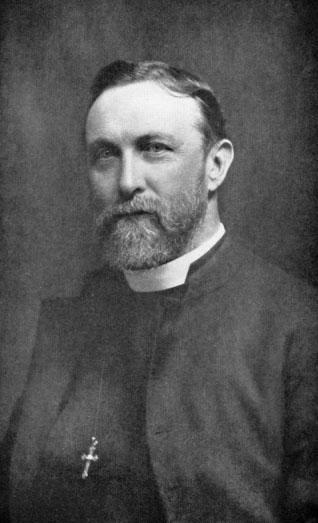
George Alfred Lefroy

George Alfred Lefroy (August 1854 – 1 January 1919) was an eminent Anglican bishop and missionary in India during the late nineteenth and early twentieth centuries. He served as Bishop of Lahore from 1899 to 1912, and then as Bishop of Calcutta from 1912 until his death.

== Biography ==
Lefroy was born on 11 August 1854 in County Down, Ireland. His was an eminent Irish family: his father was Jeffrey Lefroy, the Dean of Dromore, and his paternal grandfather was Thomas Langlois Lefroy, the Chief Justice of the Queen's Bench, Ireland. He was educated at Marlborough College, an all-boys public school (i.e. independent boarding school) in Marlborough, Wiltshire, England. From 1874 to 1878, he studied the Theological Tripos at Trinity College, Cambridge; he graduated with a first class honours Bachelor of Arts (BA) degree. As per tradition, his BA was promoted to a Master of Arts (MA Cantab) in 1883. He was awarded a Doctor of Divinity (DD) degree in 1899 by the University of Cambridge.

In 1879, Lefroy was ordained in the Church of England as a deacon by James Woodford, the Bishop of Ely. He joined the Cambridge Mission to Delhi the same year. He was ordained as a priest in 1881 by Valpy French, Bishop of Lahore. In 1891, he became head of the Society for the Propagation of the Gospel Mission in Delhi.

In 1899 he became Bishop of Lahore. Translated to become Bishop of Calcutta in 1912. Lefroy was known for his regular participation in public religious debates and for his lectures among Muslims and Hindus. He also joined fellow missionary C. F. Andrews in opposing western racism towards Indians. He died in post on 1 January 1919.

== Works ==
- Lefroy, George Alfred (1884). The leather-workers of Daryaganj . Delhi: Cambridge Mission to Delhi.

Church of England titles
Preceded by Henry Matthew	Bishop of Lahore; 1899–1912	Succeeded by Henry Durant
Preceded by Reginald Copleston	Bishop of Calcutta; 1912–1919	Succeeded by Foss Westcott
