= Wally Kahn =

British gliding pioneer

Walter Anselm Henry Kahn MBE (24 May 1926 – 15 March 2015) was a key figure in the development of gliding in Britain after the Second World War.

He was born on 24 May 1926 in Mannheim, Germany, to parents of Azerbaijani Jewish ancestry. In the late 1930s the family moved to Finchley in the UK in north London, avoiding Hitler's purges of Jewish people.

Walter (generally known as "Wally") was educated at Highgate School from 1938 until 1943. A classmate at the time was Gerard Hoffnung.

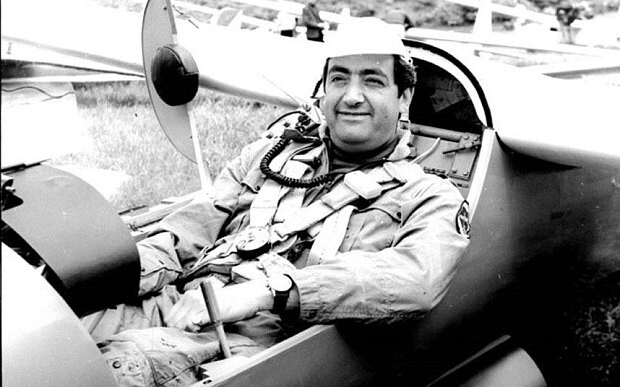
Pilot Kahn in glider at Lasham UK

Wally joined the Royal Air Force to fly in February 1944. However, the need for aircrew had diminished and he was denied a pilot's course. He worked in administration and also in bomb disposal.

After the war he became a glider pilot, mainly flying from Lasham airfield in Hampshire. This included flying tug aircraft as well as gliders.

He also became an administrator, and was on the council of the British Gliding Association for many years. In that capacity he had a view of gliding policy based on the views of the majority of its members. He did not support policies that were not based on such membership such as some that were put forward by other Council members such as Philip Wills and Ann Welch.

This led to Wally gaining support and respect in UK Gliding. His performance in gliding competitions and his work in gliding club administration, enhanced his reputation and allowed his work at higher levels to be respected.

== Awards ==
- Fédération Aéronautique International Gold Award with three Diamonds.
- Royal Aero Club's silver medal. (1995)
- British Gliding Association Gold Medal. (2014)
- Royal Air Force Air Efficiency Award
- MBE. (2011)

== Selected publications ==
- — (1998). A glider pilot bold. Alton, Hampshire: Jardine Publishers. ISBN 0953420000.
