= John Hope-Johnstone =

John Hope Johnstone may refer to:

- John Hope-Johnstone (1796–1876), Scottish Conservative MP, de jure 7th Earl of Annandale and Hartfell
- John Hope-Johnstone (1842–1912) (1841–1912), Scottish Conservative MP, de jure 8th Earl of Annandale and Hartfell
- John Hope-Johnstone (photographer) (1883–1970), British photographer, associated with the Bloomsbury Group

== See also ==
- John Johnstone (disambiguation)
