= John Webb (paediatrician) =

English cricketer and paediatrician

Personal information
- Full name: John Kingdon Guy Webb
- Born: 29 October 1918; Chingford, Essex, England
- Died: 17 August 2010 (aged 91); England
- Batting: Right-handed

Domestic team information
- Years: Team
- 1938: Oxford University

Career statistics
Competition	First-class
Matches	1
Runs scored	5
Batting average	2.50
100s/50s	–/–
Top score	5
Catches/stumpings	–/–
- Source: Cricinfo, 7 June 2020

John Kingdon Guy Webb OBE (29 October 1918 – 17 August 2010) was an English paediatrician and first-class cricketer. After attending the University of Oxford, where he played first-class cricket, Webb became a paediatrician who spent eighteen years at the Christian Medical College in Vellore, Tamil Nadu and was instrumental in helping set up a paediatric medical structure in the country.

== Early life and education ==
The son of Arthur Herbert Guy Webb and Elsie Webb (née Greengrass), he was born at Chingford in October 1918. From 1932 to 1937 he was educated at Highgate School, where he was captain of the football, cricket and Eton Fives teams as well as head boy. He then went up to Balliol College, Oxford. While studying at Oxford, he made a single appearance in first-class cricket for Oxford University against the Free Foresters at Oxford in 1938. Batting twice in the match, he was dismissed without scoring by Jack Meyer in the Oxford first innings, while in their second innings he was dismissed by the same bowler for five runs. Although he did not receive a blue in cricket, he did gain a blue playing football for Oxford University A.F.C. He additionally captained the university at Eton Fives. Partnering Howard Fabian he won the Kinnaird Cup three times, in 1937, 1939 and 1948.

== Medical career and later life ==
Having undertaken his medical training at the Radcliffe Infirmary, Webb enlisted in the British Army during the Second World War, being enlisted as a second lieutenant in the Royal Army Medical Corps in October 1942. Following the war, he served as a graded physician in the British Army of the Rhine from 1945 to 1947. He was demobilised in 1948, returning to Oxford where he was children's registrar at Churchill Hospital until 1950, before moving to Newcastle to train in paediatrics under James Calvert Spence at the Royal Victoria Infirmary.

A committed Christian, he was inspired to work at the Christian Medical College (CMCH), in Vellore, Tamil Nadu, India by a speech from Frank Lake. He was appointed professor of paediatrics at CMCH in 1953. As the only paediatrician in Vellore, Webb spent the next few years training and inspiring the next generation of paediatricians. In 1961, he recorded the pattern of liver disease in children of Vellore. As head of the paediatric department, his research was instrumental in discovering Japanese encephalitis to be the cause of encephalitis epidemic in Tamil Nadu and filariasis as the cause of tropical eosinophilia. In 1958-59 he was president of the Indian Pediatric Society which was merged into the Indian Academy of Pediatrics in 1963. Webb's wider focus in child health saw him establish community field virus laboratories and engage teams to study issues among children around Vellore, such as malnutrition. He was honoured in the 1971 Birthday Honours with an OBE. Webb returned to England after eighteen years at CMCH, the last few years of which he served as its director.

He returned to Newcastle where he became the James Spence professor of child health, mentoring and encouraging community engagement by his students under his guidance. Among his achievements was to initiate a major project that outlined the standards for the care of children in general practice. A friend of his later recalled that Webb had lobbied for beds for mothers in the children's wards in England, after observing that the practice had allayed fears and isolation for children in India. Following his retirement, Webb became director of the Child to Child programme which sought to encourage children in developing countries to share health issues with friends of family. In retirement he was engaged by Great Ormond Street Hospital, where he specialised in tropical paediatrics.

== Personal life ==
Webb died on 17 August 2010, in Gloucestershire. He was married to Alison Dora (née Reid), a medical graduate from St Hilda's College, Oxford in 1949, with his wife moving to India with him. The couple had five children, all of whom were educated in England. Four of their children followed their parents by becoming medical doctors, which included their son Jonathan, who also played rugby union for England.

== Selected publications ==
- "The pattern of disease in South Indian children". Postgraduate Medical Journal, Vol. 37, No. 149 (1961), pp. 149–159.
- "Health education for school-age children : the child-to-child programme". World Health Organization. Health Education Service & United Nations Children's Fund (UNICEF). (1985)
