= Henry Durant (bishop) =

Henry Bickersteth Durant (also spelt Durrant; 17 March 1871 – 16 January 1932) was the Bishop of Lahore from 1913 until his death.

Durant was born into a very eminent ecclesiastical family – his father was Secretary of the Church Missionary Society, his uncle was Edward Bickersteth, Bishop of Exeter, and his cousin was Edward Bickersteth, Bishop of South Tokyo. He was educated at Highgate School, and Pembroke College, Cambridge. Ordained in 1894, after a curacy at St Matthew's, East Stonehouse, he became a missionary in India, eventually rising to be Principal of St John's College, Agra. before elevation to the episcopate

Church of England titles
Preceded by George Alfred Lefroy	Bishop of Lahore; 1913 – 1932	Succeeded by George Dunsford Barne
