= Jack Johnson (Australian footballer) =

Australian rules footballer

Personal information
- Full name: Jack Johnson
- Born: 12 March 1926; Essendon, Victoria
- Died: 29 January 2008 (aged 81)
- Original team: North Essendon Methodists
- Height: 170 cm (5 ft 7 in)
- Weight: 67 kg (148 lb)
- Position: Rover

Playing career^{1}
| Years | Club | Games (Goals) |
| 1947 | Essendon | 5 (8) |
- ^{1} Playing statistics correct to the end of 1947.

Jack Johnson (12 March 1926 – 29 January 2008) was an Australian rules footballer who played with Essendon in the Victorian Football League (VFL). His career with Essendon finished when he joined the Navy where he served from 1947 until 1962.
