= John R. Johnston =

American painter (1826–1895)

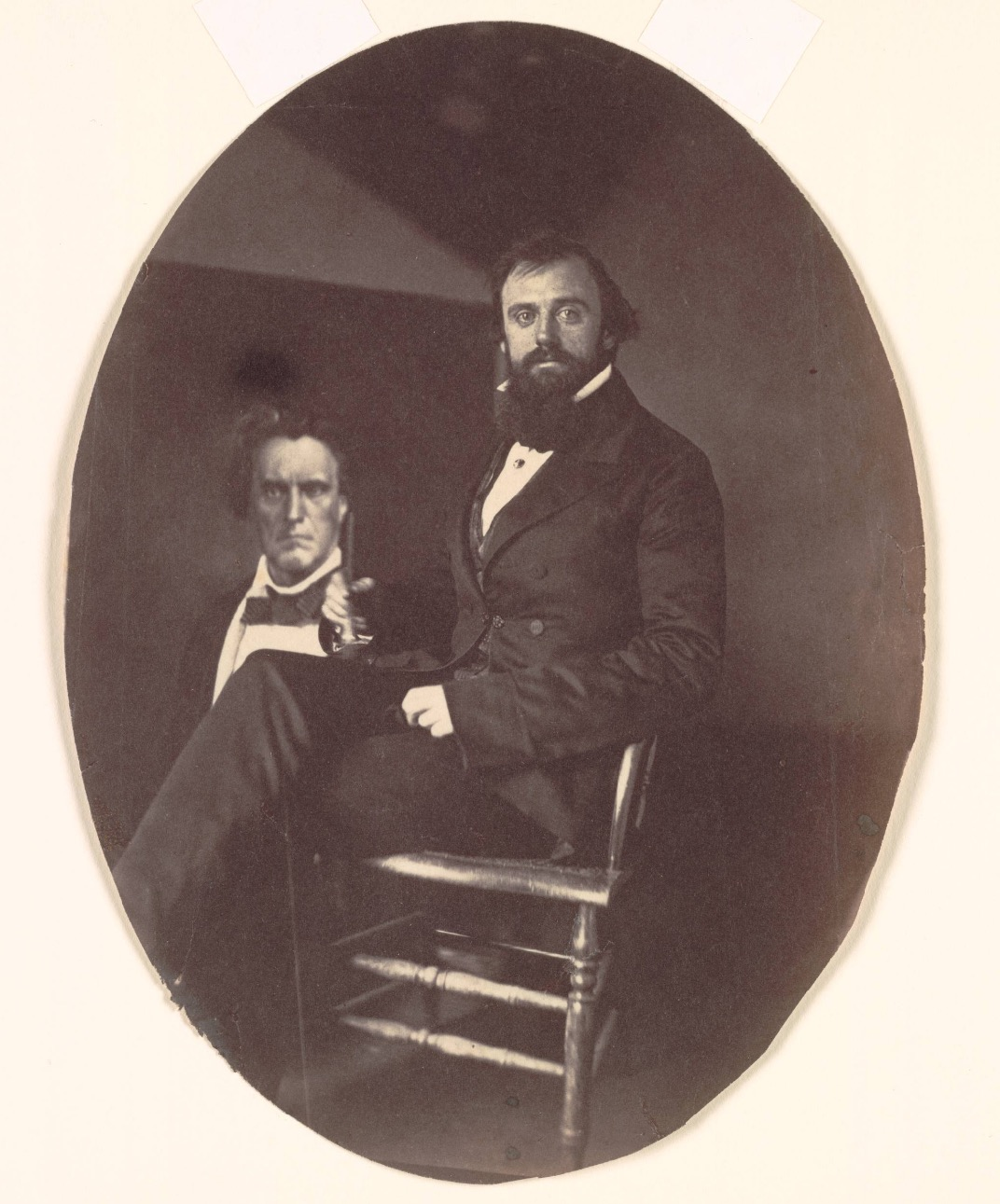
- John R. Johnston self portrait with his painting of Andrew Jackson, late 1850s
- Born: March 10, 1826; Cincinnati, Ohio, U.S.
- Died: July 29, 1895 (aged 69); Camden, New Jersey, U.S.
- Occupations: Artist, photographer

John R. Johnston (March 10, 1826 – July 29, 1895) was an American panoramic painter, photographer, and photographic colorist known for his landscape paintings. He has painted many portraits of well-known people, specifically one of Franklin Pierce and one of Andrew Jackson in 1863.

Johnston's landscapes were influenced by the Hudson River School. He assisted artists Samuel B. Stockwell and Henry Lewis with their panoramas in the late 1840s. In 1848 he collaborated with Edwin F. Durang on a biblical-themed panorama which was twelve feet wide and 1800 feet long. Johnston toured with this panorama to Louisville and Philadelphia and would deliver speeches on biblical topics along with its showing.

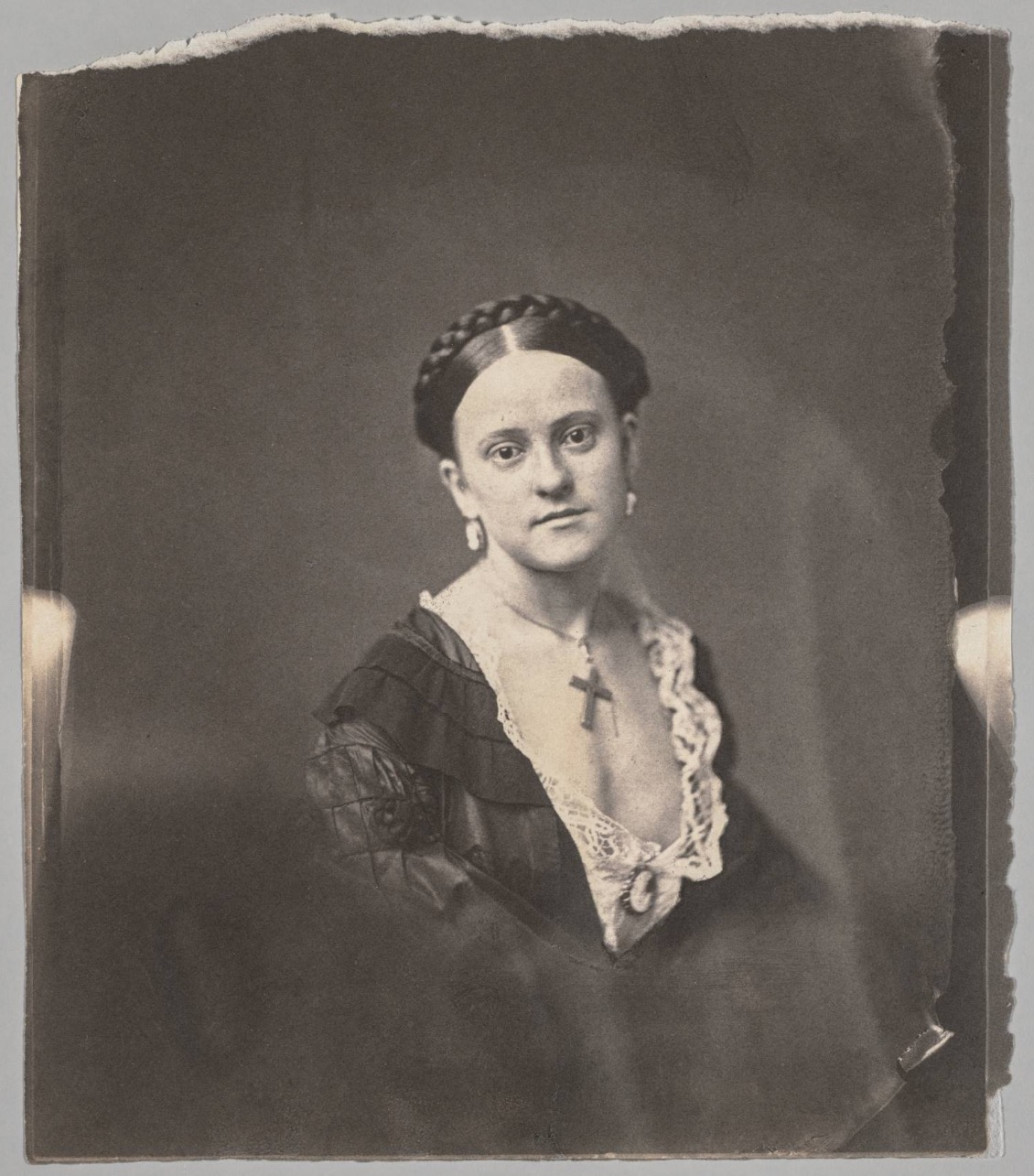
Mrs. John R. Johnston (by John R. Johnston, before 1857)

Johnston moved to Baltimore, Maryland in 1856 and worked as both a portrait artist and a photographic colorist. He worked with wet collodion negatives on salted paper. One of his prints from 1857 is titled Dr. Kane’s funeral at Cincinnati March 8th, 1857 who could not be taken because they were all moving and would not stop for Arctic explorer Elisha Kane's funeral. In 1858 he was selected to take a "scenic excursion" over the Baltimore & Ohio Railroad Company's newly opened Baltimore-to-Wheeling track which formed the basis for many of his later landscapes. He served in the Union Army during the American Civil War and was a Colonel in the First Maryland Regiment. However, he wound up in military prison, supposedly because of practical joking, left for Europe upon his release and created a panorama of his trip upon his return.

After returning, Johnston settled in Philadelphia and later Camden, New Jersey, in 1872 where he sometimes called himself Colonel Johnston. While there, he would often socialize with Walt Whitman, having dinner with him nearly every Sunday evening.

== Personal life ==
Johnson married Rebecca Freeman on February 9, 1847. They had a daughter, Ida, and a son, John Jr.
