= John Johnston (football full-back) =

Scottish footballer

Personal information
- Position: Full-back

Senior career*
| Years | Team | Apps | (Gls) |
| 1906–1907 | Dalziel Rovers | | |
| 1907 | Cambuslang Rangers | | |
| 1907–1909 | Sunderland | 1 | (0) |
| 1909–1912 | Motherwell | 51 | (0) |
- * Club domestic league appearances and goals

John Johnston was a professional footballer who played as a full-back for Sunderland and Motherwell.
