= Corhampton =

Village and parish in Hampshire, England

Coordinates: 50.978°N 1.133°W

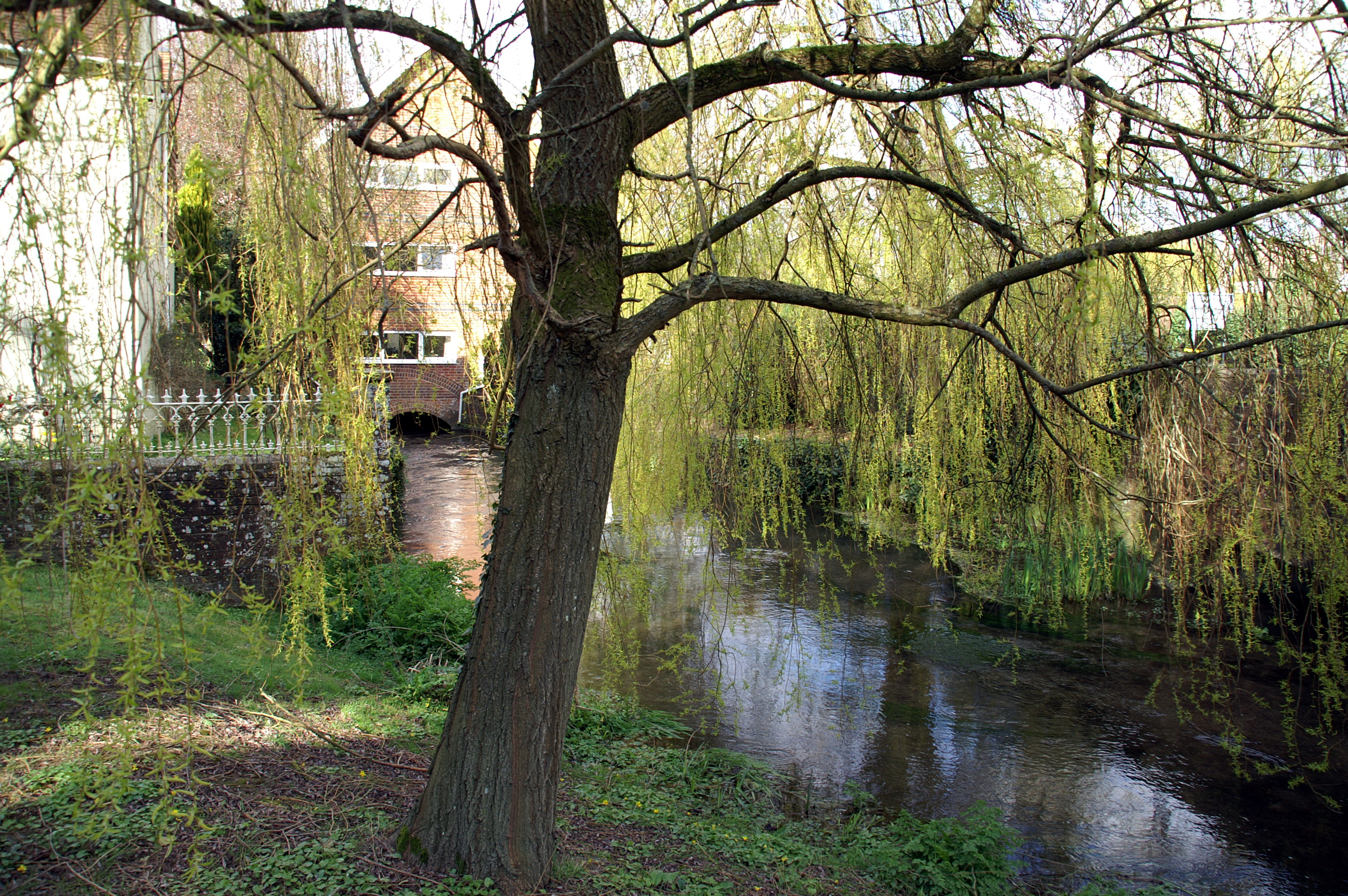
- River Meon, Corhampton Mill

- Location within Hampshire
- OS grid reference: SU6020
- Civil parish: Corhampton and Meonstoke
- District: City of Winchester
- Shire county: Hampshire
- Region: South East
- Country: England
- Sovereign state: United Kingdom
- Post town: SOUTHAMPTON
- Postcode district: SO32
- Dialling code: 01489
- Police: Hampshire and Isle of Wight
- Fire: Hampshire and Isle of Wight
- Ambulance: South Central
- UK Parliament: Winchester
- Website: Corhampton and Meonstoke Parish Council

Corhampton is a village and former civil parish, now in the parish of Corhampton and Meonstoke, in the Winchester district, in the county of Hampshire, England. It lies on the western bank of the River Meon. In 1931 the parish had a population of 87. On 1 April 1932 the parish was abolished and merged with Meonstoke to form "Corhampton and Meonstoke".

== Archaeology ==
Bronze Age bowl barrows and "Celtic fields" and circular earthworks probably dating from the Iron Age have been found on Corhampton Down in the west of the parish.

== Parish church ==
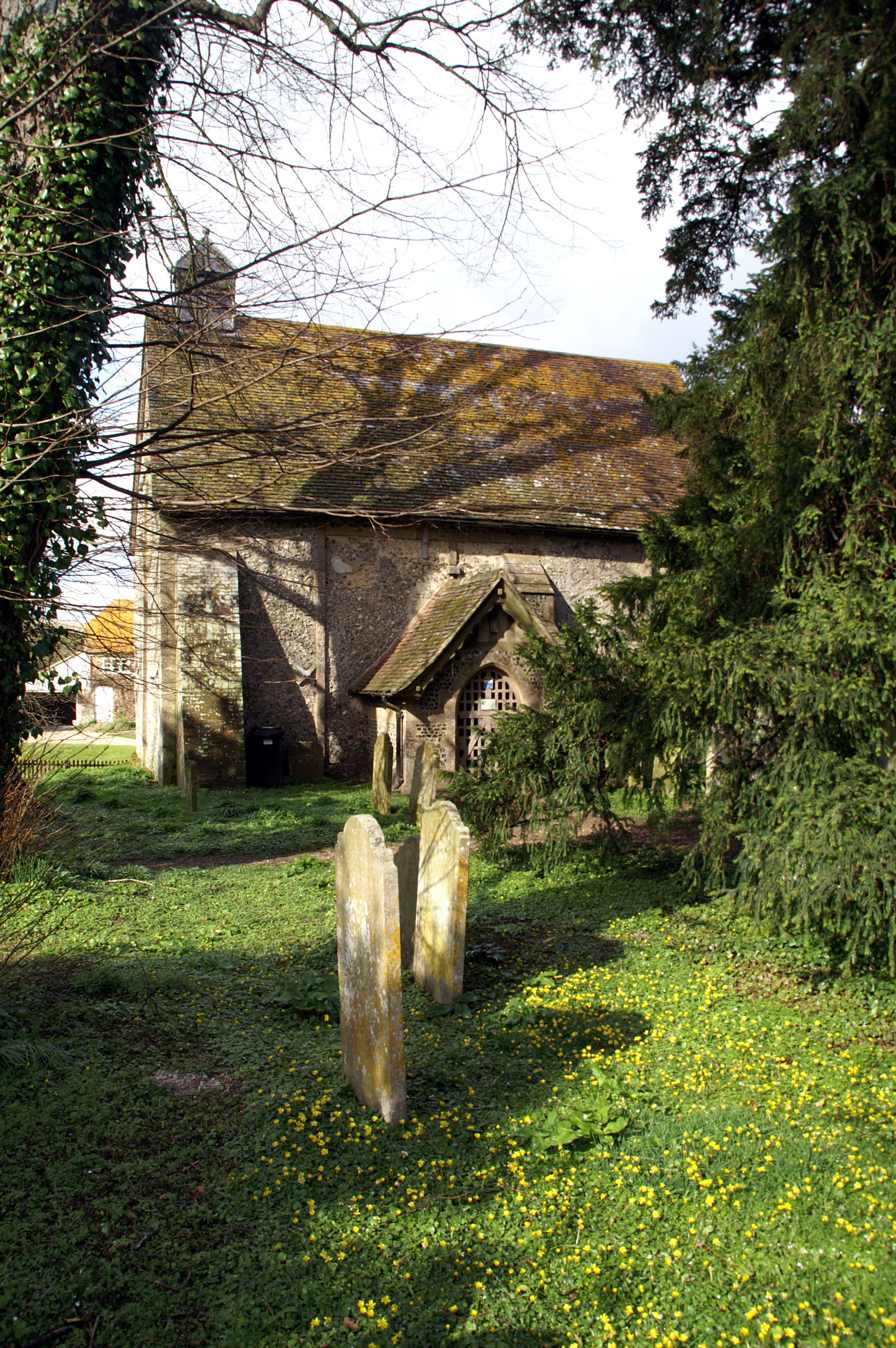
Corhampton parish church

Corhampton parish church is Saxon and was built around 1020. The font is Norman and there are 13th-century wall paintings in the chancel and a tide dial on the south wall.

In the churchyard is an ancient yew with a 26 ft girth.

== Sources ==
- Pevsner, Nikolaus; Lloyd, David (1967). Hampshire and the Isle of Wight. The Buildings of England. Harmondsworth: Penguin Books. p. 182.
