= John Mordaunt Johnson =

British diplomat

- Born: John Johnson c. 1776; Dublin
- Died: 10 September 1815; Florence
- Occupation: Diplomat

John Mordaunt Johnson (c. 1776 – 10 September 1815) was a British diplomat around the time of the Napoleonic Wars.

== Early years ==
John Johnson was born in Dublin around 1776. His parents both came from English families that had long settled in Ireland. He apparently attended Trinity College, Dublin and then Trinity College, Cambridge, but did not take a degree from either university. His father died in the spring of 1798. Johnson left Cambridge and on 20 September 1798 joined the 51st infantry regiment as an ensign. He bought a promotion to lieutenant in January 1799, but became bored with the lack of action and sold this position in the autumn of 1800.

After leaving the army Johnson added "Mordaunt" to his name, and spent some time travelling in Europe. He became proficient in several languages, and becoming a friend of the Duke of Brunswick. He came back to England in the spring of 1803, then returned to Dublin, staying there until the autumn of 1804 when he returned to Europe. He spent three more years there, mainly in Germany, renewing his connections with influential people and learning about the political situation. He returned to England, hoping to gain a position with the government, and ran into financial difficulties.

== Diplomat ==
Johnson wrote A Memoir on the Political State of Europe, intending to publish it. The Prime Minister Spencer Perceval read this work, interviewed Johnson and gave him a position in the Foreign Office as a confidential agent. He undertook several missions on the continent, at that time largely controlled by Napoleon, who was at war with Britain. He was active in the Habsburg territories at a time when normal diplomatic relations had been suspended. Metternich considered that he was the most capable and discreet of the British agents in Germany at that time. When Sweden declared war on Britain on 17 November 1810, announcing its ports were closed to British merchants, Johnson met with Count von Rosen who assured him that the declaration would have little real effect on trade and Sweden had no intention of any act of hostility.

After the Treaty of Paris was signed in 1814, bringing temporary peace, Johnson was appointed chargé d'affaires at Brussels, and then was made British consul at Genoa. He was said to be "in close and friendly correspondence with the principal ministers and generals and leading public characters of almost all the states of Europe". Johnson became infected with Tuberculosis. He travelled to Florence for the sake of his health, dying there on 10 September 1815 at the age of 39. He was unmarried. He had purchased many rare books from the collection of the Fontecastello monastery at Monte Pulciano, in Tuscany. These went on sale after his death.

== Works ==
After his death, The Gentleman's Magazine reported that one of Johnson's friends planned to publish,

a Selection from such parts of that Gentleman's Papers as relate to the War in Italy, and the Occupation of Sicily by the British. This Work will comprise Letters from many distinguished Characters; and, as Mr. Johnson was actively employed during the whole if this period in Sicily, Italy, and the Coast of Dalmatia, will throw considerable light on the events which distinguished it, and cannot fail to excite interest.

== Notes and references ==
Citations

Sources

- Barker, G.F.R. (1892). "Johnson, John Mordaunt" . Dictionary of National Biography. Vol. 30. p. 21.
- Navy Records Society (1968). Publications of the Navy Records Society. Vol. 110: The Saumarez Papers. Navy Records Society (Great Britain).
- "Obituary". The Gentleman's Magazine, and Historical Chronicle. E. Cave. October 1815. p. 377.
- Urban, Sylvanus (1817). THE Gentleman's Magazine: AND Historical Chronicle.
- Urban, Sylvanus (1821). The Gentleman's Magazine: And Historical Chronicle – Volume XCI, Part 2. p. 62.
- Voelcker, Tim (2008). Admiral Saumarez Versus Napoleon: The Baltic, 1807–12. Boydell & Brewer Ltd. ISBN 978-1-84383-431-1.
- White, William (1997). The Book Collector. Queen Anne Press. p. 204.
