= Henry Matthew =

British Anglican colonial bishop

Henry James Matthew (15 January 1837 – 2 December 1898) was an eminent British Anglican colonial bishop in the late nineteenth and early twentieth centuries.

Born in Cambridge, Matthew was educated at St Paul's School and Trinity College, Cambridge. A Chaplain at Simla in 1877, he was appointed Archdeacon of Lahore in 1877. In 1888, he became Bishop of Lahore. An acclaimed preacher, he died in post, in Lahore, in 1898. He had become a Doctor of Divinity (DD).

Anglican Communion titles
Preceded by Valpy French	Bishop of Lahore; 1888–1899	Succeeded by George Lefroy
