= John Johnson (Indiana judge) =

American judge (1776–1817)

John Johnson (c. May 27, 1776 – July 15, 1817 or September 17, 1817) was a justice of the Indiana Supreme Court from December 28, 1816, to September 10, 1817.

Born in Kentucky, Johnson "was an active early Indiana politician" who "worked on the 1806 codification of Indiana law and was a Knox County delegate to the 1816 Indiana Constitutional Convention".

Johnson was one of the first group of three justices appointed to serve on the Indiana Supreme Court after Indiana achieved statehood on December 11, 1816. However, he died "during the first recess of the Indiana Supreme Court and before any significant opinions were delivered".
