= John Johnson (cricketer, born 1871) =

English cricketer

John Inchbald Johnson (10 July 1871 – 20 October 1930) was an English cricketer who played for Northamptonshire. He was born in Aldwark Bridge and died in Culworth, Northamptonshire. The 1911 census records that, outside cricket, he was a surgeon.

He made a single first-class appearance, during the 1907 season, against Essex. From the tailend, he scored a duck in the first innings in which he batted, and didn't bat in the second innings. Northamptonshire drew the match.

He took one catch during the match.
