= John Johnson (photographer) =

American photographer (May 28, 1879–1953)

John Johnson (May 28, 1879–1953) was an American photographer. His photographs are considered among the few documents of the early 20th-century African-American community in Lincoln, Nebraska.

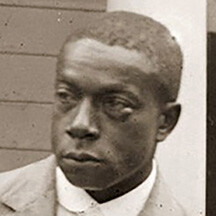
Headshot of photographer John Johnson

== Life ==
Johnson was born in Lincoln, Nebraska, in 1879, to Harriet and Margaret Johnson. His parents had self-emancipated, and his father was a Civil War veteran. John Johnson graduated from Lincoln High in 1899 and studied at the University of Nebraska. He played football for the school but never graduated. Afterward, he worked as a janitor and a drayman before beginning his photography career. Johnson married Odessa Prince in 1919; the couple had no children, and Johnson died in 1953.

== Photography ==
Johnson's began taking photographs in 1910 and ended around 1926. He took over 500 photographs. He photographed in cities other than Lincoln, including Kansas City, Missouri and Omaha, Nebraska. His black and white photographs were noted for their high contrast and natural lighting. His family portraits often showed subjects in their homes, on their porches, or outside their house. He also made many glass plate negatives of buildings and parades. Johnson did not show African-American people as poor or inferior. He typically portrayed families as well-educated and proud, by photographing them as well-dressed and posed confidently.

== Legacy ==
Johnson's photos fit into a midwestern version of the Harlem Renaissance. By portraying dignified African-Americans, Johnson encouraged their confidence and self-expression. Johnson's work is one of the earliest contributions to the movement.

Johnson's work was largely forgotten until historians found some of Johnson's glass negatives in 1999. After reading an article about the negatives, Douglas Keister connected them to a collection of negatives he bought at a garage sale. Originally, historians thought the photographs were taken by Earl McWilliams, an assistant at a photography studio in Lincoln. However, after talking to an elderly woman in Lincoln, they determined the photographer to be Johnson. Johnson's work has been displayed in the National Museum of African American History and Culture and the Museum of Nebraska Art.

== Exhibitions ==
- A Greater Spectrum: African American Artists of Nebraska 1912–2010, on view at the Museum of Nebraska Art from December 4, 2010 to April 3, 2011.
- Black and White in Black and White exhibit, on view at the Greeley History Museum from February 17 to May 28, 2022.
- Recovered Views-African American Portraits 1912–1925, on view at Grimshaw-Gudewicz Art Gallery from September 1 to October 5, 2006
- Recovered Views: African-American Portraits, 1912–1925, on view at SUNY Fredonia from March 31 to April 25, 2008.
