= John Johnston (schoolmaster) =

British educator

John Alexander Hope Johnston (died June 1938) was a British educator.

He taught at the Tonbridge School, was headmaster of Highgate School, and was an early promoter of the study of the science of aeronautics.

== Early life ==
The elder son of Major Alexander Kenneth Hope Johnston, a British Army officer, and his wife Lydia Lutener, Johnston was born at Aldershot and educated in Valletta, Malta, at Edinburgh University, where he graduated with a Master of Arts in mathematics and natural philosophy, and then finally at Pembroke College, Cambridge, graduating with a Bachelor of Arts in 1897 in the mathematical tripos as 14th wrangler.

In 1910 Johnston obtained a Doctor of Science from the University of Edinburgh.

== Career ==
At Highgate, Johnston found a school in which the focus was on classical education. Under his headship, science fifth and sixth forms were created, in which the main subjects were chemistry, physics, biology, and astronomy. Although the school had laboratories, Johnston considered them primitive and for many years pressed the school governors for better ones. Finally, in July 1928, came the opening of a new Science Building by Sir Samuel Hoare, Secretary of State for Air.

Johnston next introduced aeronautics as a school subject. He acquired a Sopwith Snipe aeroplane and five engines for it, and an Avro 504K biplane, which was housed in a hangar on top of the new science building, for the boys to work on.

Johnston stayed at Highgate as head until he retired in 1936. He died in London in June 1938.

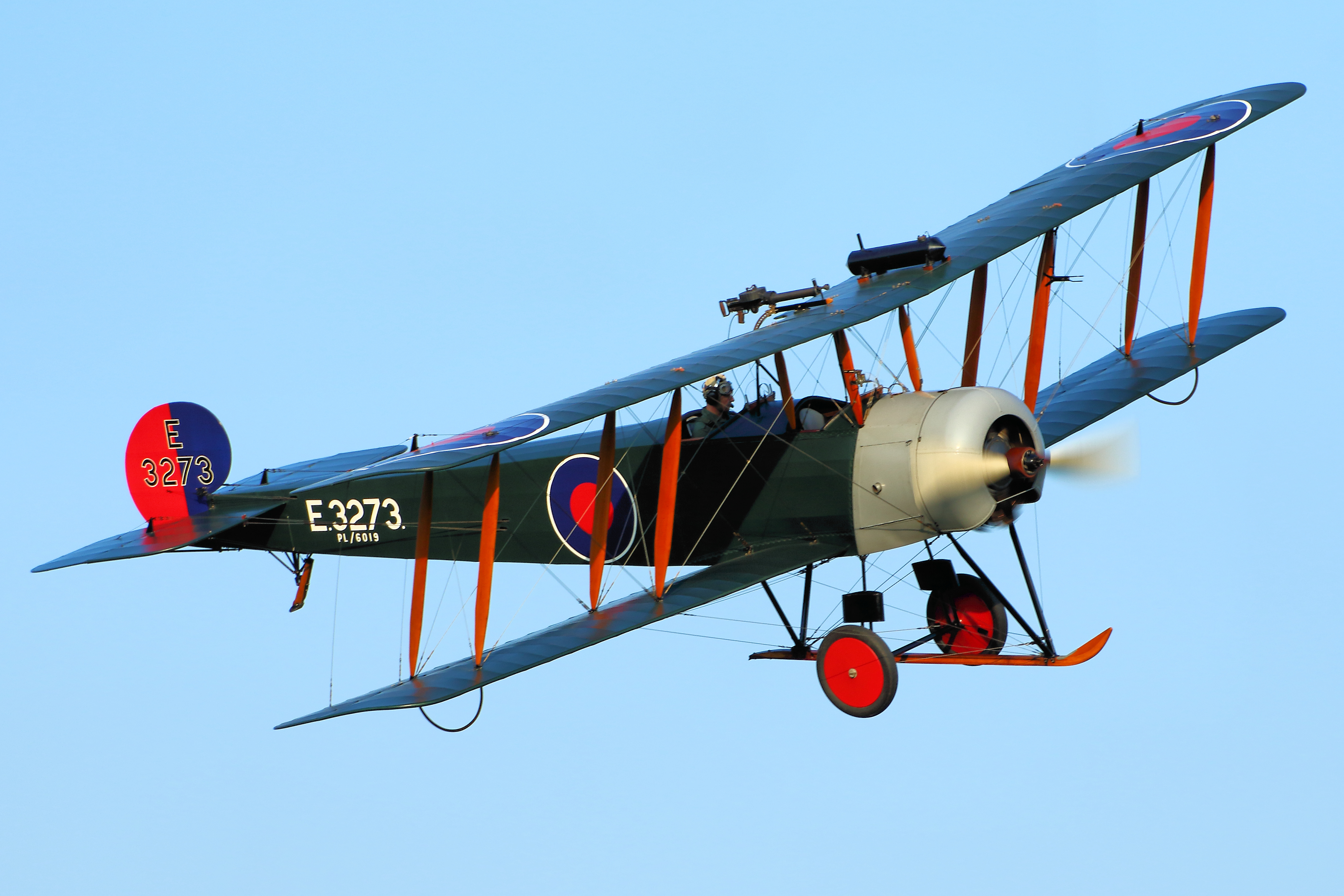
An Avro 504K

== Personal life ==
In 1904, while teaching at Tonbridge, Johnston married Kate Winsome Gammon. Their children included a son, Kenneth, born in 1906, and daughters Kathleen and Dorothy.

Their younger son John Alexander Hope Johnston became a pilot officer in the Royal Air Force and was killed on 18 April 1941, aged 27, on active service during the Second World War.

In Who's Who, Johnston's recreations were stated as golf and croquet.

After Johnston's death in 1938, his widow survived him until 1965.
