= Jonathan Johnson (politician) =

Norwegian politician (1866–1953)

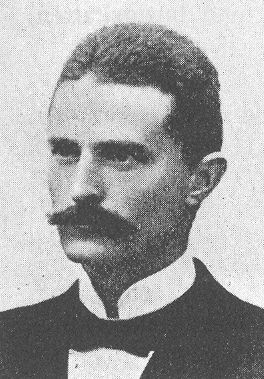
Jonathan Johnson, c. 1900

Jonathan Johnson (25 May 1866 – 22 May 1953) was a Norwegian teacher and politician for the Conservative Party.

He was born in Christiania as a son of professor Gisle Johnson and Emilie Helgine Sofie née Dybwad. His paternal grandfather Georg Daniel Barth Johnson was an MP too. His sister married Oluf Saxe.

Johnson finished his secondary education in 1883 and graduated with the cand.theol. degree in 1887. He was hired as a teacher in Tønsberg in 1889, advancing to the upper secondary school from 1902. He took up residence in Nøtterø Municipality, where he was elected to the municipal council in 1896 (serving on the executive committee) and was elected mayor in 1898.

Johnson was elected as a deputy representative to the Parliament of Norway from Jarlsberg og Larviks amt in 1900. He was later elected as an MP in 1912 and 1915. Both times, his main competitors were people from the same party. In 1912, Johnson stood on a joint ticket of the Conservative Party and the Liberal Left Party, with the Liberal Left's Ole Olsen Nauen as running mate. However, Nauen also ran as a candidate—with Johnson as the prospective running mate. In the first round, Johnson and Nauen received 1,114 and 782 votes respectively, with other candidates trailing behind. A run-off had to be held, where Johnson managed to rally 1,626 votes against Nauen's 741. Nonetheless, Nauen was elected as Johnson's deputy. In 1915, Johnson formally ran on a joint ticket of the Conservative and Liberal Left parties, but with another Conservative politician A. M. Rom as running mate. Again, Johnson won the first round, but without an absolute majority he faced Ole Ludvig Bærøe of the Agrarian Association in a run-off, which Johnson and Rom carried with 1,627 votes against 1,401. While Bærøe did carry comfortable majorities in Borre Municipality and Sem Municipality, the deciding factor was the vote of Nøtterø Municipality which Johnson/Rom won in a landslide of 1,006 against 97. During his second term, Johnson served in the Lagting.

Johnson was also a board member of Kaldnes Mekaniske Verksted. He served as mayor until 1916, left the municipal council in 1928 and retired from his teaching job in 1936, after 47 years of service in Tønsberg. He was awarded the King's Medal of Merit in gold. He died in May 1953.

Jonathan Johnson married twice. His first wife, married in 1888, died in 1894. His second marriage took place in 1897. In his second marriage to Karen Sofie Berg (1879–1961) he had the son Lauritz Johnson.
