= Johnny Johnston (footballer) =

Northern Irish footballer

Personal information
- Full name: John Johnston
- Date of birth: 2 May 1947 (age 79)
- Place of birth: Belfast, Northern Ireland
- Height: 5 ft 8 in (1.73 m)
- Position: Midfielder

Senior career*
| Years | Team | Apps | (Gls) |
- Glentoran
| 1968–1972 | Blackpool | 26 | (2) |
| 1972 | → Halifax Town (loan) | 4 | (1) |
| 1972–1974 | Bradford City | 59 | (4) |
| 1974–1976 | Southport | 82 | (6) |
| 1976–1979 | Halifax Town | 73 | (7) |
- Fleetwood Town
| Total | | 244 | (20) |
- * Club domestic league appearances and goals

John Johnston (born 2 May 1947) is a Northern Irish former professional footballer who played as a midfielder in both Northern Ireland and England.

== Career ==
Born in Belfast, Johnston began his career in his native Northern Ireland with Glentoran, before making the move to England to play in the Football League with Blackpool, for whom he made 26 League appearances. He made his debut for Stan Mortensen's men midway through the 1968–69 season, in a single-goal defeat at Portsmouth on 14 December. He made a further seven appearances before the end of the season, scoring once — a penalty in a 2–1 victory at Crystal Palace on 25 January. He also made two starts during the club's run to the fifth round of the League Cup. He made two League appearances in the following campaign, under new manager Les Shannon, scoring the only goal of the game in the second of these appearances, at home to Oxford United on 22 November. This went part way to helping the Seasiders win promotion to Division One after securing second place at the end of the season. He made thirteen League appearances in 1970–71 as the club returned whence they had come twelve months earlier, after finishing bottom of the table. In 1971–72, during which he was loaned out to Halifax Town, Johnston made three substitute appearances, the last of these in a 4–2 victory over Burnley at Bloomfield Road on 1 April.

In 1972–73 he joined Bradford City, with whom he spent two years, before signing for Southport. After another two years with the Sandgrounders, he returned to Halifax Town, this time on a permanent basis. He made 73 Football League appearances for Southport in his three years with the club, taking his total number of League appearances to 244.

Johnston later played non-League football with Fleetwood Town.
