= Bishop of Lahore (Church of Pakistan) =

The Bishop of Lahore was the Ordinary of the Church of England in Lahore from its inception in 1877 until the foundation of the Church of India, Burma and Ceylon in 1927; and since then head of one of its most prominent Dioceses. Since 1970, the diocese of Lahore has been a part of the Church of Pakistan, a United Protestant denomination.

== List of Bishops ==
Bishops of Lahore
From	Until	Incumbent	Notes
1877	1888	Valpy French	
1888	1898	Henry Matthew	Died in the act of celebrating communion at Lahore Cathedral
1899	1912	George Lefroy	
1913	1932	Henry Durant	
1932	1949	George Barne	
1949	1968	Laurence Woolmer	
1968	1980	Inayat Masih	First Bishop of Lahore in the Church of Pakistan
1980	2012	Alexander Malik	
2012	2022	Irfan Jamil	consecrated coadjutor bishop in 2011
2023	incumbent	Nadeem Kamran	Consecrated as a bishop in 2023
