= Valpy French =

19th-century English missionary and Bishop of Lahore

Rev. Thomas Valpy French
- Lahore
- Missionary to India, Pakistan and Persia
- Diocese: Lahore
- Installed: 1877
- Term ended: 1887
- Predecessor: First

Personal details
- Born: 1 January 1825 Burton upon Trent, Staffordshire, England
- Died: 14 May 1891 (aged 66) Muscat, Oman
- Buried: Muscat, Oman
- Denomination: Anglican Communion
- Parents: Rev. Peter French
- Education: University College, Oxford

Thomas Valpy French (1 January 1825 – 14 May 1891) was an English Christian Missionary in India and Persia, who became the first Bishop of Lahore, in 1877, and also founded the St. John's College, Agra, in 1853.

== Early life and education ==
Thomas Valpy French was born on New Year's Day in 1825, in Abbey, Burton upon Trent, Staffordshire, England, the son of Rev. Peter French and his wife, Penelope Arabella the daughter of the educationalist, Richard Valpy of Reading, Berkshire. Thomas' father was vicar of Holy Trinity Church, Burton upon Trent for forty-seven years, and he grew up in the house, which was once part of the Benedictine Abbey, on the banks of the River Trent.

French started his schooling at Reading Grammar School, and at age 14, he went to Rugby School. In 1843, he won a scholarship and matriculated at University College, Oxford. He graduated B.A. there in 1846, M.A. in 1849; he was made a Fellow of the college in 1848, and remained there until 1853. It was at Oxford that he first felt called to mission in India.

== Missionary career ==
On 16 April 1850 French joined the missionary service of Church Missionary Society, and was sent to Agra, India. He set sail to India on East Indian Queen on 11 September 1850 and reached Calcutta on 2 January 1851.

Soon French headed off to Agra, where he was appointed for educational work. He founded the St. John's College at Agra, which formally opened in 1853, though he had started taking classes in small room with ten boys, while the college building was being built. The college was named as St. John's, after the college of another noted missionary, Henry Martyn (1781–1812) at Cambridge. He also learnt seven languages, including Hindustani, Punjabi, Urdu, Persian, Pashto and Arabic to properly administer the school, as he also became school's first principal, and a post he held until the end of his seven-year stay at Agra.

1861 saw French moving to the Punjab, where he started a new mission, which was the first in the area, though bad health forced him to leave for England by the end of 1862. He arrived back in Britain on 7 February 1863.

In 1877, on St. Thomas' Day at Westminster Abbey, London, French was appointed the first Anglican Bishop of a large new diocese of Lahore, which included, all of the Punjab and northwestern India, and remained so until 1887, during the time he founded the Lahore Divinity College, which opened on 21 November 1870 and also remained its Principal for many years, he supervised the translation of the Bible and Prayer Book into Hindustani and Pashto, and also made visits to Kashmir and Iran (1883), where he was the first Episcopal bishop to visit the country, before returning to England, due to bad health in 1887.

French reached Muscat, on his final missionary work, on 8 February 1891 and became the first missionary to visit the region; he had just started setting up his work there, when his health started failing, and having been cared for by Portuguese Catholics he died on 14 May 1891 in Muscat, Oman and was buried in a Christian cemetery.

== Family ==
French married in 1852 Mary Anne Janson, whom he had met at Oxford, and they had eight children. Of those, Ellen Penelope French (1854–1892), went on to marry Edmund Arbuthnott Knox, fourth Bishop of Manchester, (1903–1921).

== Legacy ==
In 2007, Rowan Douglas Williams, the Archbishop of Canterbury, hailed French as a personal hero. Williams again wrote of French in his 2016 book Being Disciples, saying of him that although he "seems to have made no converts" during his final years in the Middle East, he was not there primarily to make converts but out of "the desire to be where Jesus was ... to be in the company of Jesus Christ".

Church of England titles
Preceded by None	Bishop of Lahore; 1877–1887	Succeeded by Henry Matthew
