= Johnny Johnston (cricketer) =

English cricketer

Personal information
- Full name: John Johnston
- Born: 15 February 1953; Chesterfield, Derbyshire, England
- Died: 2 June 2008 (aged 55); Stockton-on-Tees, County Durham, England
- Batting: Right-handed
- Bowling: Right-arm medium-fast

Domestic team information
- Years: Team
- 1976–1990: Durham

Career statistics
Competition	List A
Matches	8
Runs scored	8
Batting average	4.00
100s/50s	–/–
Top score	8
Balls bowled	559
Wickets	7
Bowling average	39.57
5 wickets in innings	–
10 wickets in match	–
Best bowling	2/31
Catches/stumpings	–/–
- Source: Cricinfo, 7 August 2011

John Johnston (15 February 1953 – 2 June 2008) was an English cricketer. Johnston was a right-handed batsman who bowled right-arm medium-fast. He was born in Chesterfield, Derbyshire.

== Career ==
Johnston made his debut for Durham against Cumberland in the 1976 Minor Counties Championship. He played Minor counties cricket for Durham from 1976 to 1990, making 78 Minor Counties Championship appearances and 12 MCCA Knockout Trophy appearances. He made his List A debut against Northamptonshire in the 1977 Gillette Cup. He made 7 further List A appearances, the last of which came against Middlesex in the 1989 NatWest Trophy. In his 8 List A matches for Durham, he took 7 wickets at an average of 39.57, with best figures of 2/31.

He died in Stockton-on-Tees, County Durham on 2 June 2008.
