= Longwood, Shimla =

Neighbourhood in Shimla, Himachal Pradesh, India

Longwood
- Neighbourhood
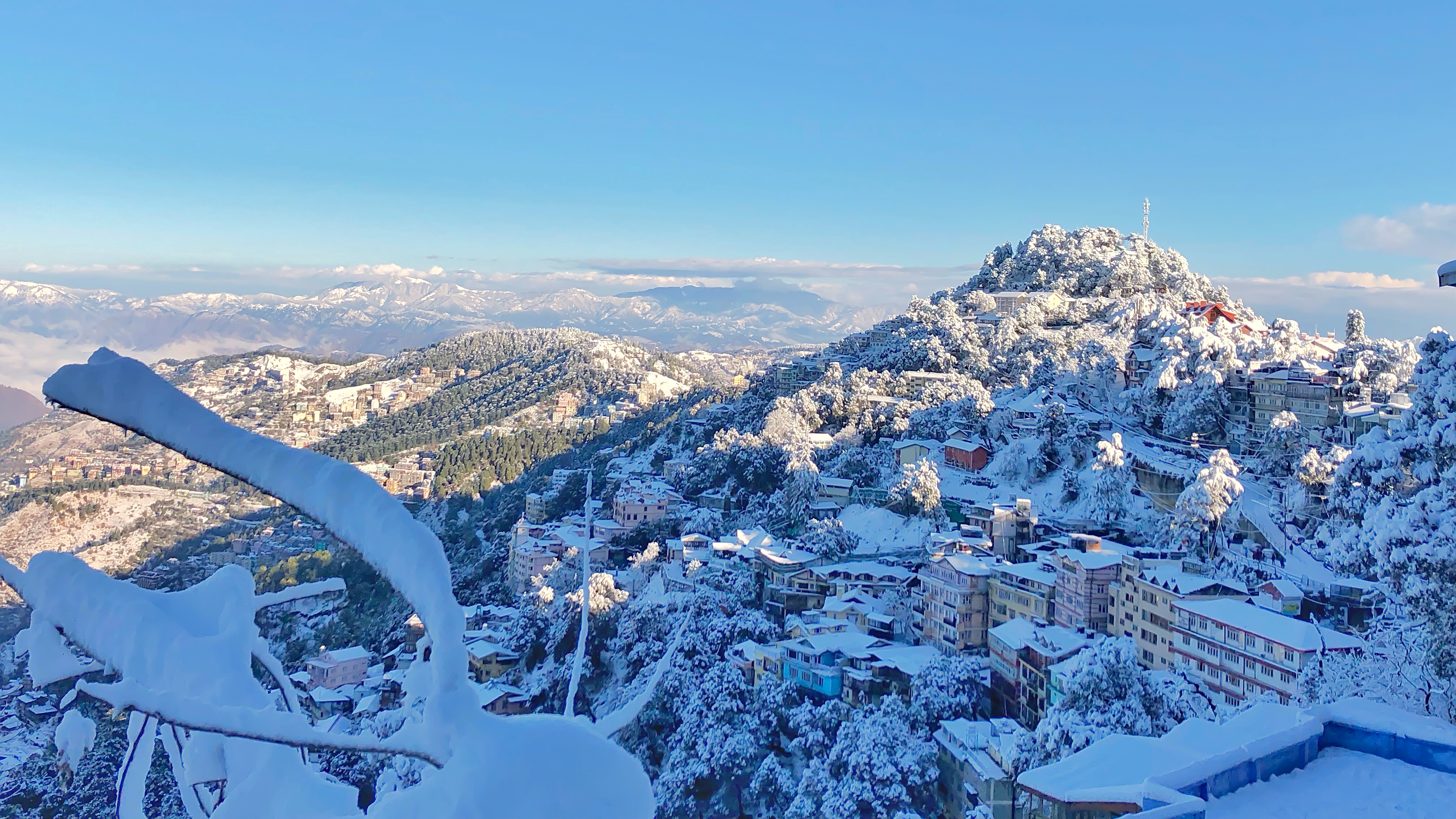
- Longwood covered in snow
- Interactive map of Longwood
- Coordinates: 31.111292°N 77.180092°E
- Country: India
- State: Himachal Pradesh
- District: Shimla
- City: Shimla
- Elevation: 2,269 m (7,444 ft)
- PIN: 171001

Longwood is a part of Shimla, located atop of Elysium Hill in the North Indian state of Himachal Pradesh. It is home to various educational institutions and administrative offices of the city as well as state.
