= Mary Clifford =

British politician

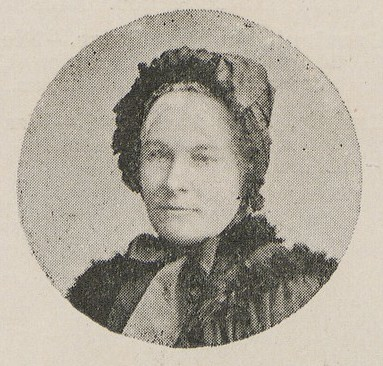
Mary Clifford in 1899

Mary Clifford (1842 – 19 January 1919) was a British politician, known as a pioneer of women serving on Boards of Guardians.

== Life ==
Born in Bristol, Clifford was the first born child of six children of Emily, (born Hassell) and the Reverend J. B. Clifford, vicar of St Matthew’s, Kingsdown. Her mother died while Mary was still young, and as the eldest child, she took on much of the responsibility for raising her younger siblings. They included Edward, later to become a noted artist, and Alfred, who served as Bishop of Lucknow. Later, she began voluntary social work in Cotham.

When her friend Catherine Winkworth began the Clifton Association for the Higher Education of Women she attended the lectures. Essays she prepared on the content were well received by John Addington Symonds and Mandell Creighton.

The 1875 election of Martha Merington to a Board of Guardians had proven that women were eligible to serve on these bodies. Clifford and two other women stood for the Barton Regis Board of Guardians in 1882, and all three were elected. Clifford soon became the most prominent woman serving on a Board of Guardians, and developed a widely-adopted scheme for the fostering of orphans. She also believed that many orphans would be better off if they were moved to Canada, and developed an emigration scheme with Mark Whitwill. She championed reductions in the power of abusive parents over their children, which were passed into law in 1889. Due to Clifford's prominence, she was co-opted to the Central Committee of Poor Law Conferences, serving on it for twelve years. In 1898, the Barton Regis Board was absorbed into the Bristol Board of Guardians, and Clifford continued to win election to the larger body.

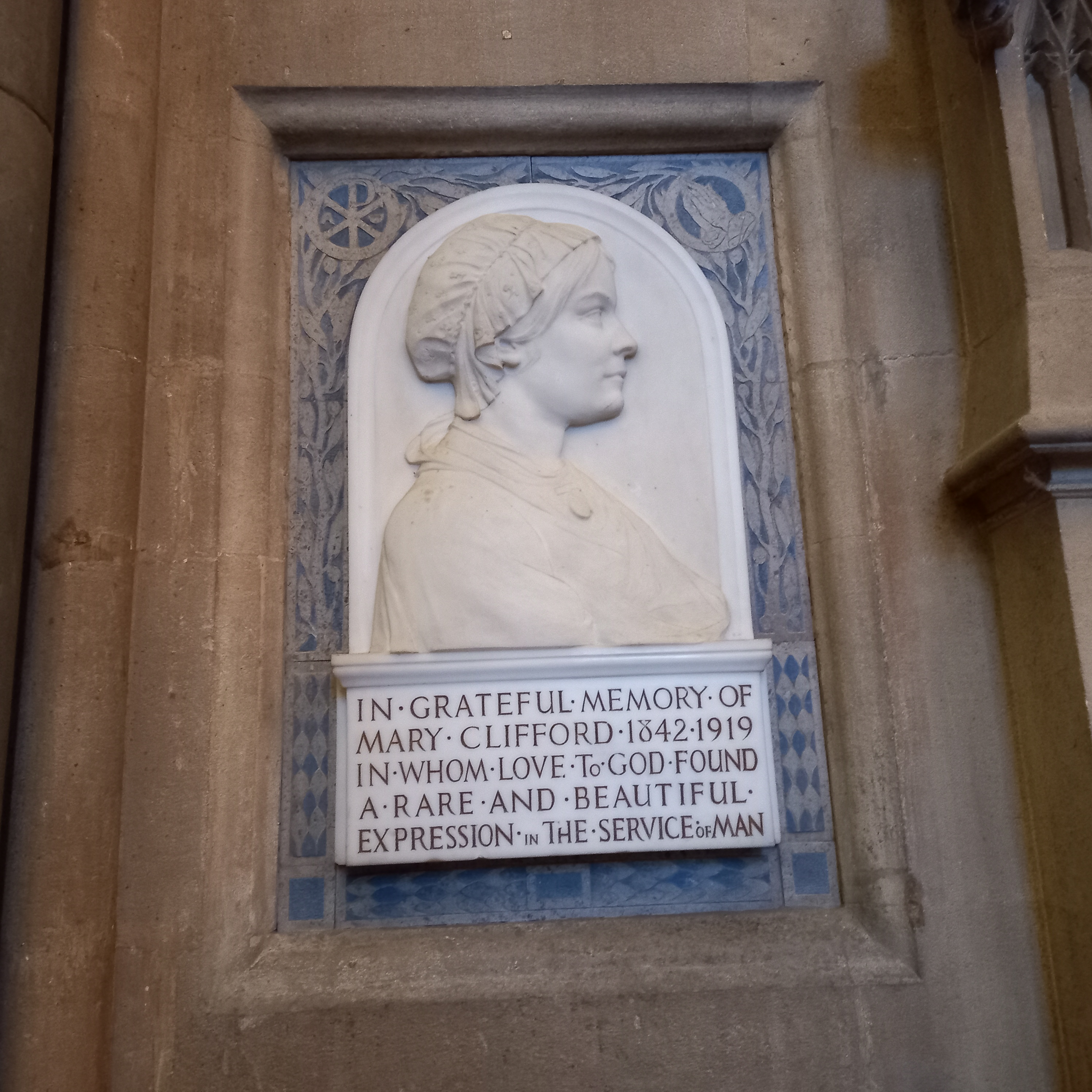
Memorial plaque to Mary Clifford in Bristol Cathedral.

Clifford was a founder member of the National Union of Women Workers (NUWW), and served as its president from 1903 to 1905. She was highly religious, and expressed concern that the organisation worked with bodies in other countries which did not share her religious views, but was satisfied that most leaders of the NUWW were Anglicans. She frequently attended and spoke at the Church Congress, and her 1899 speech on missionary work overseas was widely reported.

Clifford was known for wearing a hooded bonnet and a long cloak, considered old-fashioned at the time, and this created a myth that she was a Quaker.

Clifford retired from the Bristol Board of Guardians in 1907, due to poor health, but she lived a further twelve years.

Non-profit organization positions
| Preceded by Constance de Rothschild | President of the National Union of Women Workers; 1903–1905 | Succeeded by Elizabeth Cadbury |
