= Austin Robinson =

British economist (1897–1993)

Sir Edward Austin Gossage Robinson, CMG, OBE, FBA (20 November 1897 – 1 June 1993, Cambridge, England) was a University of Cambridge economist. He was an undergraduate at Christ's College, Cambridge, and a fellow of Sidney Sussex College, Cambridge.

A close associate of John Maynard Keynes, Robinson served as assistant editor during Keynes's time as editor of The Economic Journal; following Keynes's retirement in 1944, Robinson took over the joint editorship with Roy Harrod. He was at the centre of economic policy-making during and after the Second World War, holding posts in the Cabinet Office, the Ministry of Production and the Board of Trade. Robinson spent the postwar years working as a professor, editor, and economic adviser.

In the course of his life, Robinson also served as a seaplane pilot during the First World War, and spent two years in the 1920s tutoring a Maharajah in India. Disillusioned after his service in the war, Robinson found Keynes's lectures on his The Economic Consequences of the Peace to be "a revelation," influencing Robinson's entry into the study of economics.

He was president of the International Economic Association from 1959 to 1962.

The Faculty of Economics at the University of Cambridge is located in the Austin Robinson Building, a tribute to Robinson's contributions to the subject.

Robinson was the husband of economist Joan Robinson (1903–1983), and joined the Cambridge Circus. They had two daughters. Austin's brother was the Rt Revd Christopher Robinson, an Anglican bishop (firstly Bishop of Lucknow and later Bishop of Bombay).

== Major works ==
- The Structure of Competitive Industry (1931)
- Monopoly (1934)
