= Ed Condry =

Bishop of the Church of England

The Right Reverend Ed Condry
- Bishop of Ramsbury
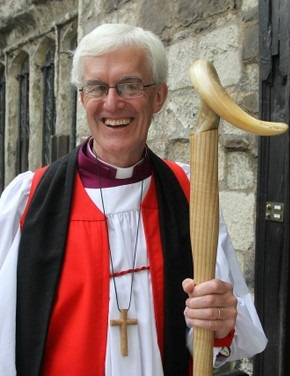
- Church: Church of England
- Diocese: Diocese of Salisbury
- In office: 2012 – 2018
- Predecessor: Stephen Conway
- Successor: Andrew Rumsey
- Other post: Canon Treasurer at Canterbury Cathedral (2002–2012)

Orders
- Ordination: 1982 (deacon); 1983 (priest)
- Consecration: 21 September 2012

Personal details
- Born: 25 April 1953 (age 73)
- Denomination: Anglican
- Spouse: Sarah Long (m. 1977)
- Children: 4
- Education: University of East Anglia; Exeter College, Oxford; Open University

Edward Francis Condry (born 25 April 1953) is a retired bishop of the Church of England. He was the suffragan Bishop of Ramsbury in the Diocese of Salisbury, 2012–2018, and Canon Treasurer of Canterbury Cathedral, 2002–2012.

== Early life and family ==
Ed Condry was born to Roy and Muriel Condry and attended Latymer Upper School in Hammersmith, London. He read for his BA at the University of East Anglia and for his BLitt at Exeter College, Oxford, graduating in 1974 and 1977 respectively. He then went on to study for his doctorate (a DPhil) from Oxford University and was awarded his doctorate in 1980 before training for the priesthood. Condry has since received an MBA through the Open University in 2002. He married Sarah Long (a school teacher) in 1977, and they now have four adult children: two sons, Felix and Jerome, and two daughters, Hannah and Frances. He played rugby for Oundle RFC and the Clodock Nomads. He ran the London Marathon for the charity Sense in 2025. Ed rows regularly with the Worshipful Company of Founders in their Thames Watermans Cutter, the Belle Founder. His son Jerome was married in Canterbury Cathedral in 2019 to Sita Elsaessa.

== Ordained ministry ==
Condry studied for the priesthood at Lincoln Theological College, being awarded his Diploma in Theology (DipTh; accredited by the University of Nottingham) in 1981. He was made a deacon at Petertide 1982 (27 June) and ordained a priest the Petertide following (26 June 1983), both times by Douglas Feaver, Bishop of Peterborough, at Peterborough Cathedral. He then served his three-year title post as assistant curate at Weston Favell, one year into which he was ordained a priest. His first incumbency was as vicar at Bloxham with Milcombe and South Newington, Oxfordshire, from 1985 until he became rector at the Rugby Team Ministry in 1993.

In 2002, Condry was appointed Canon Treasurer at Canterbury Cathedral.

=== Episcopal ministry ===
10 Downing Street announced on 19 June 2012 that Condry had been nominated suffragan Bishop of Ramsbury in the Diocese of Salisbury. He was consecrated as a bishop at Westminster Abbey on 21 September and welcomed (enthroned/installed) at Salisbury Cathedral on 23 September. As suffragan bishop, Condry had oversight of the Archdeaconries of Sarum and Wiltshire. In January 2018, it was announced that he would retire effective 30 April 2018.

After retirement, he became honorary assistant bishop in the dioceses of Peterborough and Coventry.

== Sources ==
- ‘Condry, Edward Francis’, Who's Who 2012, A & C Black, 2012; online edition, Oxford University Press, December 2011 Accessed 10 July 2012
- ‘Ed Condry Announced as the new Bishop of Ramsbury’, News from Canterbury Cathedral and the Diocese of Canterbury, Canterbury Diocese, 2012; https://web.archive.org/web/20110129102210/http://www.canterburydiocese.org/, June 2012 Accessed 10 July 2012
- ‘Suffragan See of Ramsbury’, Number 10 News, Number 10, 2012; number10.gov.uk, June 2012 Accessed 10 July 2012
- ‘Canon Treasurer: Edward Condry’, Who Does What, Canterbury Cathedral, 2012; www.canterbury-cathedral.org, 2012 Accessed 10 July 2012
