= Diocese of Nashik =

Diocese of Nashik may refer to:

- Roman Catholic Diocese of Nashik
- Diocese of Nasik (Church of North India)
