= Charles Saunders (bishop) =

Charles John Godfrey Saunders (1884 – 16 October 1973) was the Bishop of Lucknow from 1928 until 1938. He was born in 1884 and educated at Merchant Taylors' School and St John's College, Oxford. Ordained in 1912, he emigrated to India where he worked as a missionary with the SPG. From 1921 to 1925 he was Staff Chaplain at the headquarters of the Indian Army followed by another three years in a similar post serving the Metropolitan of Calcutta before his appointment to the episcopate. He was consecrated a bishop on St James's Day (25 July) 1928 at Allahabad.

On returning to England he was an Assistant Bishop of Chichester, along with a succession of Sussex incumbencies: Uckfield (1938–1942), Barcombe (1942–1947) and West Lavington (1947–1953); he retired in 1953. His last post was an honorary one, as part of the hospital chaplaincy team, in which capacity he wrote A History of the United Bristol Hospitals (Bristol, Board of Governors of the United Bristol Hospitals, 1960), in retirement at Bristol where he died on 16 October 1973.

Church of England titles
Preceded by George Westcott	Bishop of Lucknow; 1928–1938	Succeeded by Sydney Bill
