= Stephen Conway =

British Anglican bishop and Lord Spiritual (born 1957)

The Right Reverend Stephen Conway SCP
- Former Bishop of Lincoln
- Church: Church of England
- Diocese: Diocese of Lincoln
- In office: 2023–September 2026
- Predecessor: Chris Lowson
- Previous posts: Acting Bishop of Lincoln (2022–2023); Bishop of Ely (2010–2023); Bishop of Ramsbury (2006–2010)

Orders
- Ordination: 1986 (deacon); 1987 (priest) by Michael Ball (deacon); David Jenkins (priest)
- Consecration: 22 June 2006 by Rowan Williams

Personal details
- Born: 22 December 1957 (age 68)
- Denomination: Anglican
- Profession: Teacher (formerly)
- Education: Keble College, Oxford; Selwyn College, Cambridge

Member of the House of Lords
- Lord Spiritual
- Bishop of Lincoln; 21 November 2023 – 30 September 2026
- Bishop of Ely; 7 July 2014 – 21 November 2023

Stephen David Conway SCP (born 22 December 1957) is a former British Anglican bishop. From July 2023 to September 2026, he served as the Bishop of Lincoln. Prior to that he had been successively Bishop of Ramsbury (an area/suffragan bishop in the Diocese of Salisbury), then Bishop of Ely. Following allegations of sexual assault he was suspended and later resigned from his ministry.

== Early life and education ==
Conway was born on 22 December 1957. He was educated at Archbishop Tenison's Grammar School, a state grammar school in Lambeth, London. He studied modern history at Keble College, Oxford, graduating with a Bachelor of Arts (BA) degree; as per tradition, his BA was promoted to a Master of Arts (MA Oxon).

Conway remained at Keble College to undertake teacher training, and he completed a Postgraduate Certificate in Education (PGCE) in 1981. He then became a teacher, working as an assistant master at Glenalmond College, a private school in Perth, Scotland, between 1981 and 1983.

In 1983, Conway started at Westcott House, Cambridge, an Anglican theological college in the Liberal Catholic tradition, to train for ordained ministry. During this time he also matriculated, studying theology, at Selwyn College, Cambridge, and he graduated with a further Bachelor of Arts (BA) degree in 1985. After a further year of training, he left theological college in 1986 to be ordained in the Church of England.

== Ordained ministry ==
Conway was made a deacon at Petertide 1986 (29 June) by Michael Ball, Bishop of Jarrow, and ordained a priest the following Petertide (28 June 1987) by David Jenkins, Bishop of Durham — both times at Durham Cathedral. From 1986 to 1989, he served his curacy at St Mary's Church, Heworth in the Diocese of Durham. He was an assistant curate at Church of St Michael and All Angels, Bishopwearmouth, Sunderland, between 1989 and 1990, and then an honorary curate of St Margaret's Church, Durham, between 1990 and 1994. From 1989 to 1994, he was also Director of Ordinands for the Diocese of Durham. He then moved to St Mary's Church, Cockerton, Darlington, where he was Priest-in-Charge from 1994 to 1996 and Vicar from 1996 to 1998.

From here he became senior chaplain to Michael Turnbull, Bishop of Durham; and subsequently Archdeacon of Durham.

=== Episcopal ministry ===
On 2 May 2006, his nomination as Bishop of Ramsbury was announced, and he was consecrated on 22 June 2006. He was the last area bishop under that diocese's 1981–2009 area scheme. Following the retirement of David Stancliffe as Bishop of Salisbury in July 2010, Conway was made responsible for the administration of that diocese. On 31 August 2010, it was announced that he would be the next Bishop of Ely. He was elected by the College of Canons at Ely on 18 October 2010, and the election was confirmed by the provincial court on 6 December 2010, at which point he legally became the Bishop of Ely. His installation and enthronement was held in Ely Cathedral on 5 March 2011.

In accordance with constitutional practice, upon becoming the twenty-sixth most senior bishop in the Church of England (after the Archbishop of Canterbury, the Archbishop of York, the Bishops of London, Durham and Winchester, and the nineteen other longest serving Bishops), Conway became one of the Lords Spiritual of the House of Lords on 4 June 2014. He was introduced to the House on Monday, 7 July 2014.

It was announced that Conway was to serve as both Bishop of Ely and Acting Bishop of Lincoln (each half-time) from 1 January 2022. He stepped down as acting bishop on 20 April 2023, and returned to being the full-time Bishop of Ely.

On 24 May 2023, it was announced that Conway was to be translated to Lincoln as substantive bishop diocesan in "autumn" 2023; his translation was effected by the confirmation of his election on 20 July 2023 at St Mary-le-Bow. He was enthroned Bishop of Lincoln on Armistice Day.

On 20 February 2026 he was suspended from his ministry due to an ongoing safeguarding investigation. The suspension followed a complaint filed with the church's safeguarding team the previous month accusing Conway of sexual assault against a male complainant. Conway was arrested on 21 February as part of a police investigation into the allegation and later released on bail. Nicholas Chamberlain has assumed his duties as bishop pending the outcome of the investigation. In late February 2026, Conway resigned as episcopal visitor to the Shrine of Our Lady of Walsingham; this resignation was accepted by the Guardians of the Shrine. He resigned as bishop in September 2026.

=== Views ===
Following the conclusion of the Living in Love and Faith process in January 2023, Conway stated that he supports "faithful same-sex couples to have their union affirmed in church and for them to receive God's blessing".

In November 2023, he was one of 44 Church of England bishops who signed an open letter supporting the use of the Prayers of Love and Faith (i.e. blessings for same-sex couples) and called for "Guidance being issued without delay that includes the removal of all restrictions on clergy entering same-sex civil marriages, and on bishops ordaining and licensing such clergy".

== Styles ==
- The Reverend Stephen Conway (1986–2002)
- The Venerable Stephen Conway (2002–2006)
- The Right Reverend Stephen Conway (2006–present)

Church of England titles
Preceded by Peter Hullah	Bishop of Ramsbury; 2006–2010	Succeeded by Ed Condry
Preceded by Anthony Russell	Bishop of Ely; 2010–2023	TBA
Preceded by Chris Lowson	Bishop of Lincoln; 2023–present	Incumbent
