= Brooke Foss Westcott =

British bishop, scholar and theologian (1825–1901)

The Right Reverend Brooke Foss Westcott
- Bishop of Durham
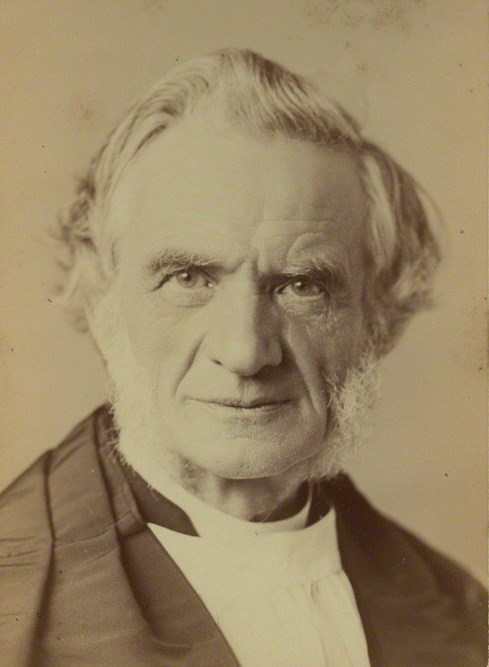
- Diocese: Durham
- In office: 1890–1901 (died)
- Predecessor: Joseph Lightfoot
- Successor: Handley Moule

Personal details
- Born: 12 January 1825 Birmingham, UK
- Died: 27 July 1901 (aged 76) Auckland Castle, County Durham, UK
- Buried: Auckland Castle chapel
- Denomination: Anglican
- Residence: Auckland Castle (as Bishop of Durham)
- Spouse: Sarah Louisa Mary Whithard (m. 1852)
- Education: King Edward's School, Birmingham
- Alma mater: Trinity College, Cambridge
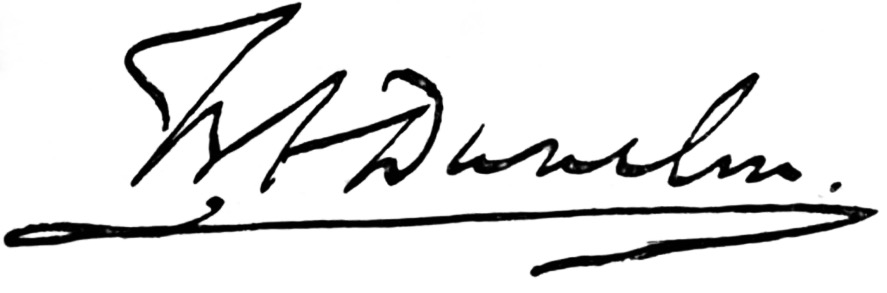
- Signature

Brooke Foss Westcott (12 January 1825 – 27 July 1901) was an English bishop, biblical scholar and theologian, serving as Bishop of Durham from 1890 until his death. He is perhaps most known for co-editing The New Testament in the Original Greek in 1881. He was an enthusiastic supporter of the British Empire.

== Early life and education ==
He was born in Birmingham. His father, Frederick Brooke Westcott, was a botanist. Westcott was educated at King Edward VI School, Birmingham, under James Prince Lee, where he became friends with Joseph Barber Lightfoot, later Bishop of Durham.

The period of Westcott's childhood was one of political ferment in Birmingham and amongst his earliest recollections was one of Thomas Attwood leading a large procession of men to a meeting of the Birmingham Political Union in 1831. A few years after this Chartism led to serious disturbances in Birmingham and many years later Westcott would refer to the deep impression the experiences of that time had made upon him.

In 1844, Westcott entered Trinity College, Cambridge, where he was invited to join the Cambridge Apostles. He became a scholar in 1846, won a Browne medal for a Greek ode in 1846 and 1847, and the Members' Prize for a Latin essay in 1847 and 1849. He took his BA degree in January 1848, obtaining double-first honours. In mathematics, he was twenty-fourth wrangler, Isaac Todhunter being senior. In classics, he was senior, being bracketed with Charles Broderick Scott, afterwards headmaster of Westminster School.

== Early teaching career ==
After obtaining his degree, Westcott remained in residence at Trinity. In 1849, he obtained his fellowship; and in the same year, he was made deacon by his old headmaster, James Prince Lee, now Bishop of Manchester. In 1851 he was ordained and became an assistant master at Harrow School. As well as studying, Westcott took pupils at Cambridge; fellow readers included his school friend Lightfoot and two other men who became his attached and lifelong friends, Edward White Benson and Fenton Hort. The friendship with Lightfoot and Hort influenced his future life and work.

He devoted much attention to philosophical, patristic and historical studies, but his main interest was in New Testament work. In 1851, he published his Norrisian prize essay with the title Elements of the Gospel Harmony. The Cambridge University Norrisian Prize for theology was established in 1781 by the will of John Norris Esq of Whitton, Norfolk for the best essay by a candidate between the ages of twenty and thirty on a theological subject.

He combined his school duties with his theological research and literary writings. He worked at Harrow for nearly twenty years under Charles Vaughan and Henry Montagu Butler, but he was never good at maintaining discipline among large numbers.

== Early theological writings ==
In 1855, he published the first edition of his History of the New Testament Canon, which, frequently revised and expanded, became the standard English work on the subject. In 1859, there appeared his Characteristics of the Gospel Miracles.

In 1860, he expanded his Elements of the Gospel Harmony essay into an Introduction to the Study of the Gospels. Westcott's work for Smith's Dictionary of the Bible, notably his articles on "Canon," "Maccabees", and "Vulgate," led to the composition of his subsequent popular books, The Bible in the Church (1864) and a History of the English Bible (1869). To the same period belongs The Gospel of the Resurrection (1866). It recognised the claims of historical science and pure reason. At the time when the book appeared, his method of apologetic showed originality but was impaired by the difficulty of the style.

In 1865, he took his B.D., and in 1870, his D.D. Later, he received honorary degrees of DC.L. from Oxford (1881) and of D.D. from Edinburgh (1883). In 1868, Westcott was appointed examining chaplain by Bishop Connor Magee (of Peterborough); and in the following year, he accepted a canonry at Peterborough, which forced him to leave Harrow.

== Regius Professorship of Divinity, Cambridge ==
For a time he was enthusiastic about a cathedral life, devoted to the pursuit of learning and to the development of opportunities for the religious and intellectual benefit of the diocese. But the Regius Professorship of Divinity at Cambridge fell vacant, and J. B. Lightfoot, who was then Hulsean Professor, refused it in favour of Westcott. It was due to Lightfoot's support almost as much as to his own great merits that Westcott was elected to the chair on 1 November 1870.

Westcott now occupied a position for which he was suited. He played a leading part in raising the standard of theological study at the university. Supported by his friends Lightfoot and Hort, he reformed the regulations for degrees in divinity and was responsible for the formation and first revision of the new theology tripos. He planned lectures and organised the new Divinity School and Library.

He worked hard and forwent many of the privileges of a university career so that his studies might be more continuous and that he might see more of his students.

=== Lectures ===
His lectures were generally on Biblical subjects. His Commentaries on St John's Gospel (1881), on the Epistle to the Hebrews (1889), and the Epistles of St John (1883), resulted from his public lectures.

One of his most valuable works, The Gospel of Life (1892), a study of Christian doctrine, incorporated the materials upon which he delivered a series of more private and esoteric lectures on weekday evenings. Lecturing was an intense strain to him, but his influence was immense: to attend one of Westcott's lectures was an experience which encouraged those to whom the references to Origen or Rupert of Deutz were unintelligible.

=== New Testament textual studies ===
Between 1870 and 1881, Westcott was also continually engaged in text critical work for an edition of the New Testament and, simultaneously, in the preparation of a new text in conjunction with Hort. The years in which Westcott, Lightfoot and Hort could thus meet frequently and naturally to discuss the work all three were engaged in, formed a happy period in their lives.

In the year 1881, there appeared the famous Westcott and Hort text of the New Testament, upon which had been expended nearly thirty years of incessant labour.

=== Educational reformer ===
The reforms in the regulations for degrees in divinity, the formation and first revision of the new theological tripos, the inauguration of the Cambridge Mission to Delhi and the subsequent founding of St. Stephen's College, Delhi, the institution of the Church Society (for the discussion of theological and ecclesiastical questions by the younger men), the meetings for the divinity faculty, the organisation of the new Divinity School and Library and, later, the institution of the Cambridge Clergy Training School (renamed Westcott House in 1901 in his honour), were all, in a very real degree, the result of Westcott's energy and influence as Regius professor. To this list should also be added the Oxford and Cambridge preliminary examination for candidates for holy orders, with which he was from the first most closely identified.

The departure of Lightfoot to become Bishop of Durham in 1879 was a great blow to Westcott. Nevertheless, it resulted in bringing him into still greater prominence. He was compelled to take the lead in matters where Lightfoot's more practical nature had previously been predominant.

=== Canonry at Westminster Abbey ===
In 1883, Westcott was elected to a professorial fellowship at King's. Shortly afterwards, having previously resigned his canonry at Peterborough, he was appointed by the crown to a canonry at Westminster Abbey, and accepted the position of examining chaplain to Archbishop Benson.

His little edition of the Paragraph Psalter (1879), arranged for the use of choirs, and his lectures on the Apostles' Creed, entitled Historic Faith (1883), are reminiscences of his vacations spent at Peterborough. He held his canonry at Westminster in conjunction with the regius professorship.

The strain of the joint work was very heavy, and the intensity of the interest and study which he brought to bear upon his share in the labours of the Ecclesiastical Courts Commission, of which he had been appointed a member, added to his burden.

Preaching at Westminster Abbey gave him an opportunity to deal with social questions. His sermons were generally portions of a series; and to this period belong the volumes Christus Consummator (1886) and Social Aspects of Christianity (1887). Westcott's presidency of the Christian Social Union from 1889 did much to draw mainstream, respectable churchgoers into calling for justice for the poor and unemployed in the face of the predominant laissez-faire economic policies.

== Bishop of Durham ==
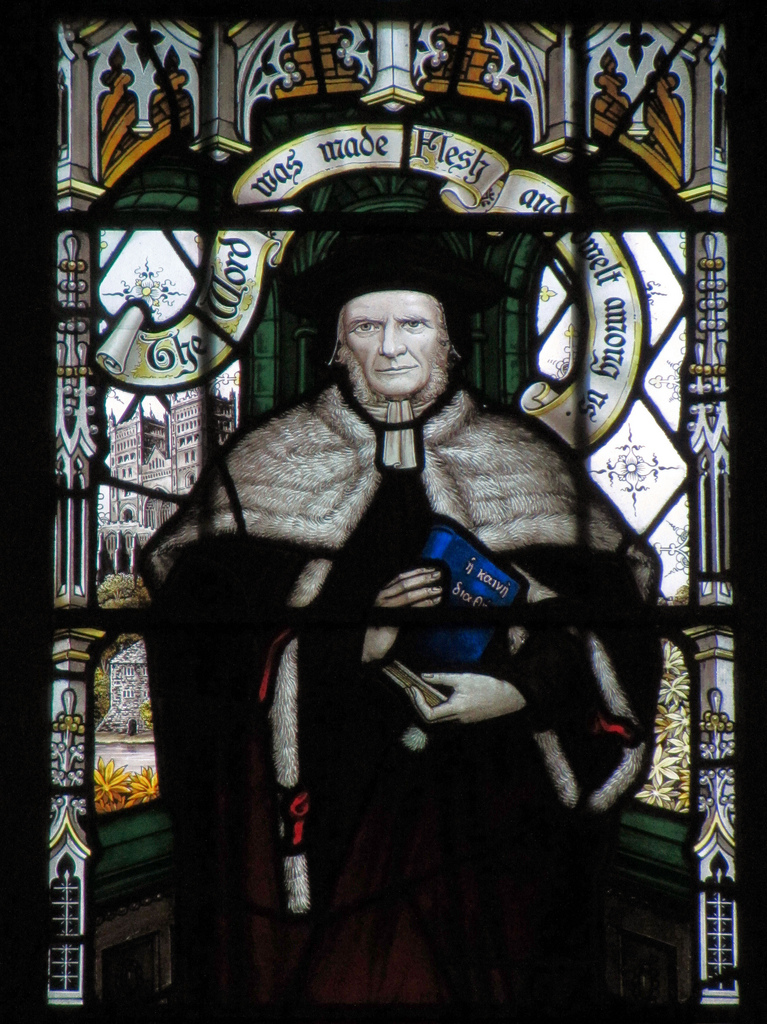
Bishop Westcott shown standing in front of Durham Cathedral in a window in All Saints Church, Cambridge.

In March 1890, he was nominated to follow in the steps of his beloved friend Lightfoot, who had died in December 1889. His election was confirmed by Robert Crosthwaite, Bishop of Beverley (acting as commissioner for the Archbishop of York) on 30 April at York Minster and he was consecrated on 1 May at Westminster Abbey by William Thompson, Archbishop of York, Hort being the preacher, and enthroned at Durham Cathedral on 15 May.

Contrary to his reputation as a recluse and a mystic, he took a practical interest in the mining population of Durham and in the shipping and artisan industries of Sunderland and Gateshead. On occasion, in 1892 he succeeded in bringing to a peaceful solution a long and bitter strike which had divided the masters and men in the Durham collieries.

Westcott was involved in appointing the first deaconess which was new but it underlined the proposal to create women deacons as imagined by his predecessor and as argued by Emily Marshall who aspired to see women serving on an equal basis in the Anglican church.

He has been described as a Christian socialist and was a staunch supporter of the co-operative movement. He was practically the founder of the Christian Social Union. He continually insisted upon the necessity of promoting the cause of foreign missions; four of his sons went on to do missionary work for the Church in India.

He was energetic to the very end, but during the last two or three years of his life, he aged considerably. His wife died suddenly in May 1901, and he dedicated to her memory his last book, Lessons from Work (1901). He preached a farewell sermon to the miners in Durham Cathedral at their annual festival on 20 July. Then came a short, sudden and fatal illness. He was buried in the chapel of Auckland Castle.

== Family ==
Westcott married, in 1852, Sarah Louisa Mary Whithard (ca 1830–1901), daughter of Thomas Middlemore Whithard, of Bristol. Mrs Westcott was for many years deeply interested in foreign missionary work. She became an invalid in her later years and died on 28 May 1901. They had seven sons and three daughters, including Frederick, who followed his father into the ministry in the Church of England, was headmaster of Sherborne School, Archdeacon of Norwich, and author of multiple books on the Letters of Saint Paul; George, Bishop of Lucknow; and Foss, who became Bishop of Calcutta and Metropolitan of India.

== Legacy and influence ==
Westcott was not a narrow specialist. He loved poetry, music and art. His literary sympathies were wide. He would never tire of praising Euripides, and studied the writings of Robert Browning. He was also said to be a talented draughtsman and used often to say that if he had not taken orders he would have become an architect. He followed with delight the development of natural science studies at Cambridge. He spared no pains to be accurate, or to widen the basis of his thought. Thus he devoted one summer vacation to the careful analysis of Auguste Comte's Politique positive.

He studied assiduously The Sacred Books of the East, and earnestly contended that no systematic view of Christianity could afford to ignore the philosophy of other religions. The outside world was wont to regard him as a mystic; and the mystical, or sacramental, view of life enters, it is true, very largely into his teaching. He had in this respect many points of similarity with the Cambridge Platonists of the 17th century, and with F. D. Maurice, for whom he had profound regard. An amusing instance of his unworldliness was his observation that "I never went to the Derby. Once, though, I nearly did: I happened to be passing through Derby, that very day".

He was a strong supporter of Church reform, especially in the direction of obtaining larger powers for the laity.

He kept himself aloof from all party strife. He describes himself when he says:

The student of Christian doctrine, because he strives after exactness of phrase, because he is conscious of the inadequacy of any one human formula to exhaust the truth, will be filled with sympathy for every genuine endeavour towards the embodiment of right opinion. Partial views attract and exist in virtue of the fragment of truth—be it great or small—which they include; and it is the work of the theologian to seize this no less than to detect the first spring of error. It is easier and, in one sense, it is more impressive to make a peremptory and exclusive statement, and to refuse to allow any place beside it to divergent expositions; but this show of clearness and power is dearly purchased at the cost of the ennobling conviction that the whole truth is far greater than our individual minds. He who believes that every judgement on the highest matters different from his own is simply a heresy must have a mean idea of the faith; and while the qualifications, the reserve, the lingering sympathies of the real student make him in many cases a poor controversialist, it may be said that a mere controversialist cannot be a real theologian

His theological work assigned great importance to Divine Revelation in Holy Scripture and in the teaching of history. His own studies have largely contributed in England to its current understanding of the doctrines of the Resurrection and the Incarnation.

Some American fundamentalists have denounced Westcott's and Hort's Greek text of the Bible as corrupt. Most of these critics subscribe to the King James Only movement.

A portrait of Westcott by William Edwards Miller is in the collection of Trinity College, Cambridge.

Brooke Foss Westcott is remembered in the Church of England with a commemoration on 27 July.

== Works ==
The following is a bibliography of Westcott's more important writings, giving the date of the first editions:

- Elements of the Gospel Harmony (1851)
- A General Survey of the History of the Canon of the New Testament (1855; revised 1875)
- Characteristics of the Gospel Miracles (1859)
- Introduction to the Study of the Gospels (1860; revised 1866)
- The Bible in the Church (1864)
- The Gospel of the Resurrection (1866; revised 1879)
- A General View of the History of the English Bible (1868; revised by W A Wright 1905)
- Christian Life Manifold and One (1869)
- On the religious office of the universities (1873)
- Paragraph Psalter for the Use of Choirs (1879)
- Commentary on the Gospel of St John in the Speaker's Commentary, Volume 2 of New Testament (1880), reprinted as a separate item The Gospel According to St John (1882)
- Commentary on the Epistles of St John (1883)
- The Revelation of the Risen Lord (1882)
- The Historic Faith: short lectures on the Apostles' Creed (1885)
- The Revelation of the Father: short lectures on the titles of the Lord in the Gospel of St John (1884)
- Some Thoughts from the Ordinal (1884)
- Christus Consummator (1886)
- Social Aspects of Christianity (1887)
- The Victory of the Cross: Sermons in Holy Week (1888)
- Commentary on the Epistle to the Hebrews (1889)
- From Strength to Strength (1890)
- Essays in the History of Religious Thought in the West (1891)
- The Gospel of Life: thoughts introductory to the study of Christian doctrine (1892)
- The Incarnation and Common Life (1893)
- Some Lessons of the Revised Version of the New Testament (1897)
- Christian Aspects of Life (1897)
- Lessons from Work (1901)
- Saint Paul's Epistle to the Ephesians: the Greek text (1906)
- The Two Empires: the Church and the World (1909)

== See also ==
- List of New Testament papyri
- List of New Testament uncials

== Sources ==
- Westcott, Arthur (1903). Life and Letters of Brooke Foss Westcott. Vol. I. London: MacMillan and Co. Ltd.

Church of England titles
Preceded by Joseph Lightfoot	Bishop of Durham; 1890–1901	Succeeded by Handley Moule
Academic offices
Preceded by James Jeremie	Regius Professor of Divinity at Cambridge; 1870–1890	Succeeded by Henry Barclay Swete
