= Hullah =

Hullah is a surname. Notable people with the surname include:

- Glynis Hullah (born 1948), English cricketer
- John Pyke Hullah (1812–1884), English composer and teacher
- Paul Hullah (born 1963), English writer
- Peter Hullah (born 1949), British Anglican bishop
