= Edward Clifford =

English artist and author (1844–1907)

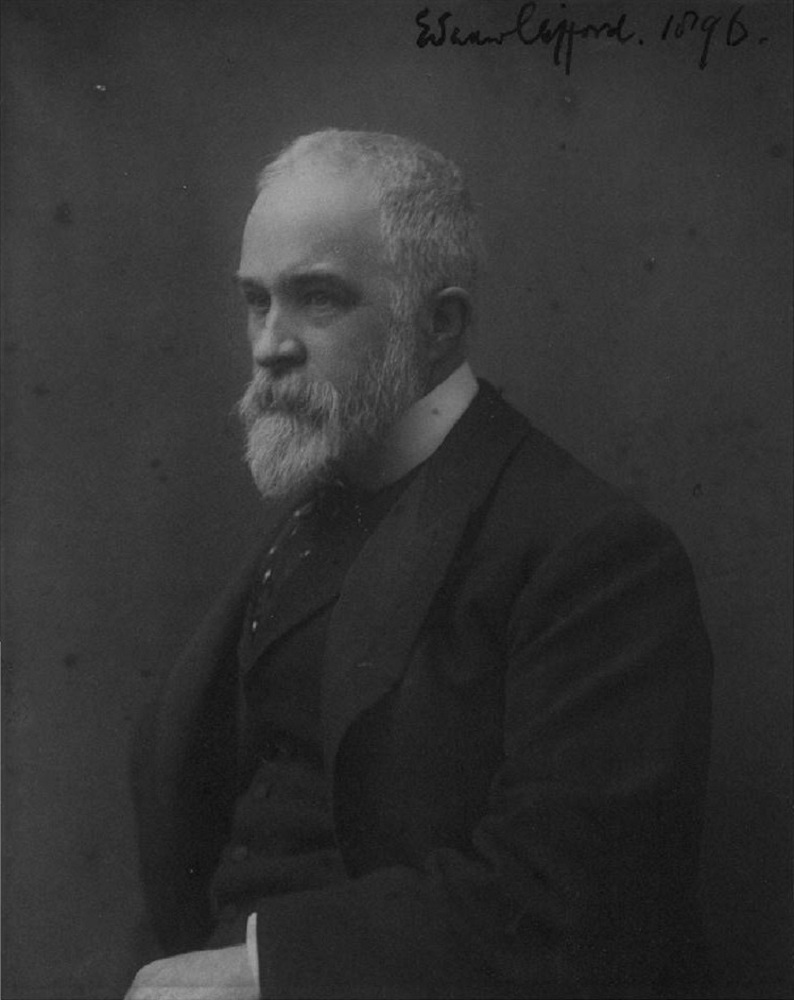
Edward Clifford in 1896

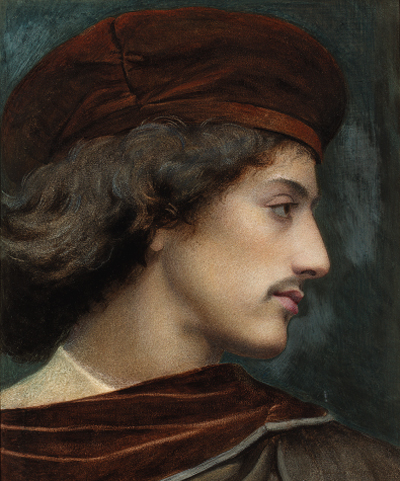
Tito Melema, pencil, watercolour and bodycolour, with gum arabic painting by Edward Clifford

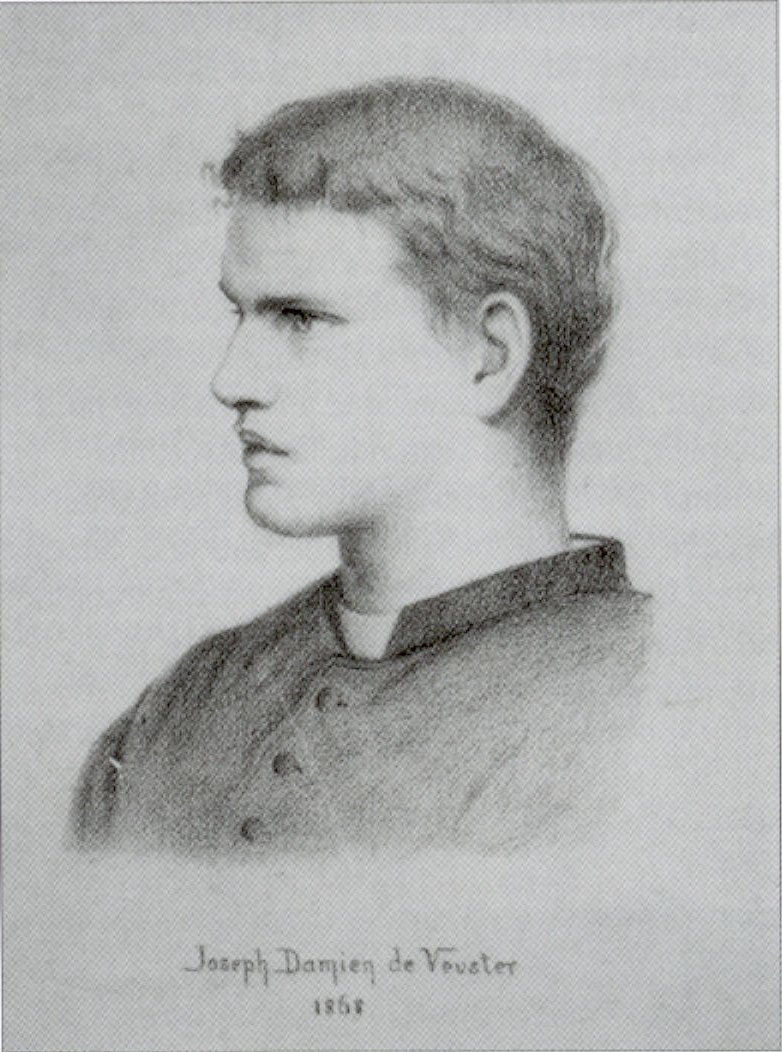
Portrait of Father Damien, by Edward Clifford, graphite on paper, 1889, Honolulu Museum of Art

Edward Clifford (1844 in Bristol – 1907) was an English artist and author.

Clifford was the younger brother of Mary, who later became a pioneering Poor Law Guardian, and the other brother of Alfred, who later served as Bishop of Lucknow.

== Work ==
Clifford is best known for his portraits in watercolor, and was associated with the Aesthetic Movement in late 19th-century England. He was also honorary Secretary of the Church Army, which evangelized for the Church of England. Clifford visited India and Kashmir to learn about methods of controlling leprosy. He returned to England and then traveled to Honolulu and visited the leper colony in Kalaupapa, Hawaii in 1888, where he met Father Damien. During this time, there was a widespread fear that leprosy might reach Great Britain, and Damien’s name had become synonymous with the fight against it. After returning to England, Clifford made watercolor paintings from portrait sketches made in Hawaii and eventually, in 1889, published an account of the journey.

The Bishop Museum (Honolulu), the Harvard University Portrait Collection, the Honolulu Museum of Art, the National Portrait Gallery (London), and the National Portrait Gallery (United States) are among the public collections holding work by Edward Clifford.
