= George Westcott =

English bishop (1862–1928)

George Herbert Westcott (18 April 1862 – 16 January 1928) was the Bishop of Lucknow from 1910 until his death in 1928.

George Herbert Westcott was born into a very distinguished clerical family: his father Brooke Westcott was Bishop of Durham from 1890 until 1901, and his younger brother Foss Westcott would be Bishop of Calcutta and Metropolitan of India from 1919 until 1945. He was educated at Marlborough College and Peterhouse, Cambridge. He was ordained in 1886 and, after a brief period as Chaplain at his old school, emigrated to India where he worked as a missionary with the SPG. From 1898 he was Examining Chaplain to the inaugural Bishop of Lucknow whom in time he succeeded. He died in post on 16 January 1928, his Times obituary noting his "missionary zeal to secure the self government of the Indian Church."

== Notes ==
Church of England titles
Preceded by Alfred Clifford	Bishop of Lucknow; 1910–1928	Succeeded by Charles John Godfrey Saunders
