= Peter Vaughan (bishop) =

Bishop of Ramsbury

The Right Reverend Peter Vaughan
- Bishop of Ramsbury
- Diocese: Diocese of Salisbury
- In office: 1989–1998
- Predecessor: John Neale
- Successor: Peter Hullah
- Other posts: Honorary assistant bishop in Gloucester (2005–2011) and in Bristol (2002–2011); in Bradford (1998–2001); Archdeacon of Westmorland and Furness (1983–1989)

Orders
- Ordination: 1957 (deacon); 1958 (priest)
- Consecration: 1989

Personal details
- Born: 27 November 1930
- Died: 4 April 2020 (aged 89)
- Denomination: Anglican
- Parents: Dr Victor & Dorothy
- Spouse: Elisabeth Parker (m. 1961)
- Children: 1 son; 2 daughters
- Education: Selwyn College, Cambridge

Peter St George Vaughan (27 November 1930 – 4 April 2020) was the area Bishop of Ramsbury from 1989 to 1998.

Vaughan was educated at Charterhouse School and Selwyn College, Cambridge, before beginning his ordained ministry as a curate at Birmingham Parish Church, followed by an appointment as a chaplain to The Oxford Pastorate based at St Aldate's Church, Oxford. He was then the vicar of Christ Church Galle Face, Colombo, Sri Lanka, from 1967 to 1972 before becoming the precentor of Holy Trinity Cathedral, Auckland and then principal of Crowther Hall, the Church Mission Society college at Selly Oak, and then (his final appointment before ordination to the episcopate) Archdeacon of Westmorland and Furness. In retirement he became a house-for-duty assistant bishop of Bradford until 2001, then as an honorary assistant bishop in the Diocese of Bristol and Diocese of Gloucester.

He died in April 2020 at the age of 89.

Church of England titles
Preceded by John Neale	Bishop of Ramsbury; 1989–1998	Succeeded by Peter Hullah
