= Andrew Rumsey =

British Anglican bishop (born 1968)

The Right Reverend Andrew Rumsey
- Bishop of St Albans
- Church: Church of England
- Diocese: Diocese of St Albans
- In office: 2026 to present
- Predecessor: Alan Smith
- Previous post: Bishop of Ramsbury (2019–2026)

Orders
- Ordination: 1997 (deacon); 1998 (priest)
- Consecration: 25 January 2019 by Justin Welby

Personal details
- Born: 11 February 1968 (age 58)
- Denomination: Anglicanism
- Spouse: Rebecca (m. 1998)
- Children: 3
- Education: University of Reading; Ridley Hall, Cambridge; King's College London

Andrew Paul Rumsey (born 11 February 1968) is a British Anglican bishop. Since 2026, he has been Bishop of St Albans in the Church of England. Previously, he undertook parish ministry and served as the Bishop of Ramsbury, a suffragan bishop of the Diocese of Salisbury, from 2019 to 2026.

== Early life and education ==
Rumsey was born in 1968 in Hitchin, Hertfordshire, England. He was baptised at St Martin's Church, Knebworth, where his father Canon Philip Rumsey was vicar. He studied history at the University of Reading, graduating with a Bachelor of Arts (BA) degree in 1989. He trained for ordination at Ridley Hall, Cambridge, and graduated with a Master of Arts (MA) degree in pastoral theology in 1998.

In later life, Rumsey took a Doctor of Theology and Ministry (DThMin) degree at King's College London, graduating in 2016. His doctoral thesis was titled "What kind of place is the Anglican parish? A theological description".

== Ordained ministry ==
Rumsey was ordained in the Church of England: made deacon at Petertide 1997 (26 June) by Richard Chartres, Bishop of London, at St Paul's Cathedral; and ordained priest the Petertide following (5 July 1998), by Graham Dow, Bishop of Willesden, at St Martin's Church, Ruislip. He was Vicar of Christ Church, Gipsy Hill, Lambeth, from 2001 to 2011, then until 2018 was Rector of St Mary's Church, Oxted, in the Diocese of Southwark.

=== Episcopal ministry ===
In October 2018, he was announced as the next Bishop of Ramsbury, a suffragan bishop in the Diocese of Salisbury. On 25 January 2019, he was consecrated a bishop by Justin Welby, Archbishop of Canterbury, during a service at Southwark Cathedral. In an interview following his consecration, he stated that Evensong is his favourite form of church service. He was welcomed into the diocese as the 17th Bishop of Ramsbury during Evensong at Salisbury Cathedral on 26 January 2019.

Rumsey has created several series of short video reflections on the theology of place, entitled Going to Ground, which are available on YouTube. The first series began in March 2020, at a time of national lockdown due to the COVID-19 epidemic. Many of the videos are recorded on the grounds of church buildings in and around Wiltshire, while others are recorded in the natural rural environment. He has written several books, most recently English Grounds in 2021, published by SCM Press.

On 19 March 2026, he was announced as the next Bishop of St Albans, the diocesan bishop of the Diocese of St Albans. The confirmation of election took place during a ceremony at St Mary-le-Bow, London, on 9 June 2026, whereby he legally and formally became the Bishop of St Albans. He was installed at St Albans Cathedral on 19 September 2026.

=== Views ===
In November 2023, he was one of 44 Church of England bishops who signed an open letter supporting the use of the Prayers of Love and Faith (i.e. blessings for same-sex couples) and called for "Guidance being issued without delay that includes the removal of all restrictions on clergy entering same-sex civil marriages, and on bishops ordaining and licensing such clergy".

Also in 2023, Rumsey took part in a ceremony to bless the River Marden as a sentient being, together with Kate Dineen, a shamanic practitioner. The event is to be repeated in March 2024.

== Personal life ==
In 1998, Rumsey married Rebecca. Together they have three children; two daughters and one son.

== Selected works ==
- Rumsey, Andrew (1998). Homing in. Milton Keynes: Paternoster Press. ISBN 9781900507721.
- Rumsey, Andrew (2009). Strangely Warmed: Reflections on God, Life and Bric-a-Brac. The Mowbray Lent Book 2010. ISBN 978-1441130686.
- Rumsey, Andrew (2017). Parish: An Anglican Theology of Place. London: SCM Press. ISBN 978-0334054849.
- Rumsey, Andrew (2021). English grounds: a pastoral journal. London: SCM Press. ISBN 978-0334061144.
