= Sydney Bill =

British bishop and chaplain

Sydney Alfred Bill was the Bishop of Lucknow from 1939 until 1947. He was born in 1884 and educated at Trinity College, Cambridge. Ordained in 1908 his first post was as Curate at St George’s Birmingham. He then emigrated to India in 1911 where he began his long association with the Lucknow Diocese, where he was successively the Bishop's Chaplain, Canon Residentiary at All Saint’s Cathedral and Archdeacon before his elevation to the episcopate. On returning to England he was Vicar of Instow for a further 8 years.

== Notes ==
Church of England titles
Preceded by Charles John Godfrey Saunders	Bishop of Lucknow; 1939 – 1947	Succeeded by Christopher Robinson
