= Henry Read =

British Anglican bishop in North India (1890–1963)

Henry Cecil Read (25 December 1890 – 29 May 1963) was an Anglican bishop in India from 1944 to 1957.

He was born on, Christmas Day 1890, educated at Wellington College and Caius and ordained in 1915. He was a CMS Missionary until he became Principal St Andrew Divinity School in 1930, a post he held for nine years. From 1940 to 1944 he was Archdeacon of Aurangabad when he became Bishop of Nasik. He was a Canon Residentiary at Rochester Cathedral until 1961 and died on 29 May 1963.

== Notes ==
Anglican Communion titles
Preceded by Philip Henry Loyd	Bishop of Nasik; 1944– 1957	Succeeded by Arthur William Luther
