= Arthur Luther =

Arthur William Luther (31 March 1919 – 25 January 2009) was an Anglican bishop in India from 1957 to 1973.

He was educated at Nagpur University and ordained in 1974. He was Chaplain to the Bishop of Nagpur then Headteacher of Bishop Cotton Boys' School before his appointment to the episcopate as Bishop of Nasik in 1957. Translated to Bombay in 1970, he retired three years later.

Church of England titles
Preceded by Henry Read	Bishop of Nasik; 1957– 1970	Succeeded by Jonathan Vairagar
Preceded by Christopher Robinson	Bishop of Bombay; 1970 – 1973	Succeeded by Dinesh Chandra Gorai
