= Alfred Clifford =

Anglican bishop (1849–1931)

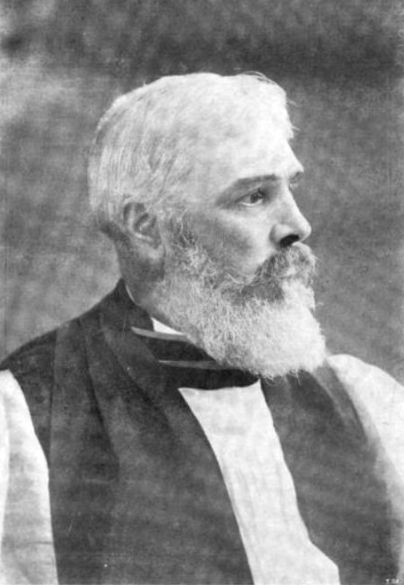
- Born: 1849; Torquay, England
- Died: 27 April 1931 (aged 82); Clifton, England
- Education: Corpus Christi College, Cambridge
- Occupation: Clergyman

Alfred Clifford (1849 – 27 April 1931) was a British Anglican bishop, the inaugural Bishop of Lucknow from 1893 until 1910.

== Biography ==
Alfred Clifford was born in Torquay in 1849 and educated at Corpus Christi College, Cambridge. He was the younger brother of Mary, who became a pioneering Poor Law Guardian, and Edward, who became a noted artist.

Clifford was ordained in 1872 and, after a brief period as curate at St Nicholas Nottingham, emigrated to India Here he worked for the Church Missionary Society before gaining the post of chaplain to the Bishop of Calcutta in 1885. Eight years later he ascended to the episcopate, a post he held for seventeen years. In retirement he returned to England and served as Vicar of Stoke Bishop.

He died at Clifton, Bristol on 27 April 1931.

Church of England titles
Preceded by Inaugural appointment	Bishop of Lucknow; 1893–1910	Succeeded by George Herbert Westcott
