= Bishop of Ramsbury =

Suffragan bishop in the Church of England

The Bishop of Ramsbury is an episcopal title used by a suffragan bishop of the Church of England Diocese of Salisbury, in the Province of Canterbury, England. The title takes its name from the village of Ramsbury in Wiltshire, and was first used between the 10th and 11th centuries by the Anglo-Saxon Bishops of Ramsbury; the modern See was erected under the Suffragans Nomination Act 1888 by Order in Council dated 24 October 1973. From the establishment of the Salisbury area scheme in 1981 until its abolition in 2009, the bishops suffragan of Ramsbury were area bishops. The bishop oversees the Wiltshire parts of the diocese, i.e. the Archdeaconries of Sarum and Wiltshire.

The diocese announced in August 2011 that the Bishop of Salisbury had commissioned (under new national guidelines) a consultation as to whether a new Bishop of Ramsbury should be appointed.

The Roman Catholic Church has also a Bishop of Ramsbury (Ramsbiria as latin name), a titular bishop since 1969 (currently James Curry, Auxiliary Bishop in Westminster).

== Modern bishops suffragan ==
Bishops of Ramsbury
From	Until	Incumbent	Notes
1974	1988	John Neale	b. 1926; first area bishop from 1981
1989	1998	Peter Vaughan	b. 1930
1999	2005	Peter Hullah	b. 1949
2006	2010	Stephen Conway	b. 1957; last area bishop until 2009; translated to Ely.
2012	2018	Ed Condry	b. 1953; nominated on 19 June 2012; consecrated 23 September 2012; retired 30 April 2018.
2019	2026	Andrew Rumsey	b. 1968; nominated on 22 October 2018; translated to St Albans.
