= Foss Westcott =

The Right Reverend Foss Westcott
- Bishop of Calcutta and Metropolitan of India
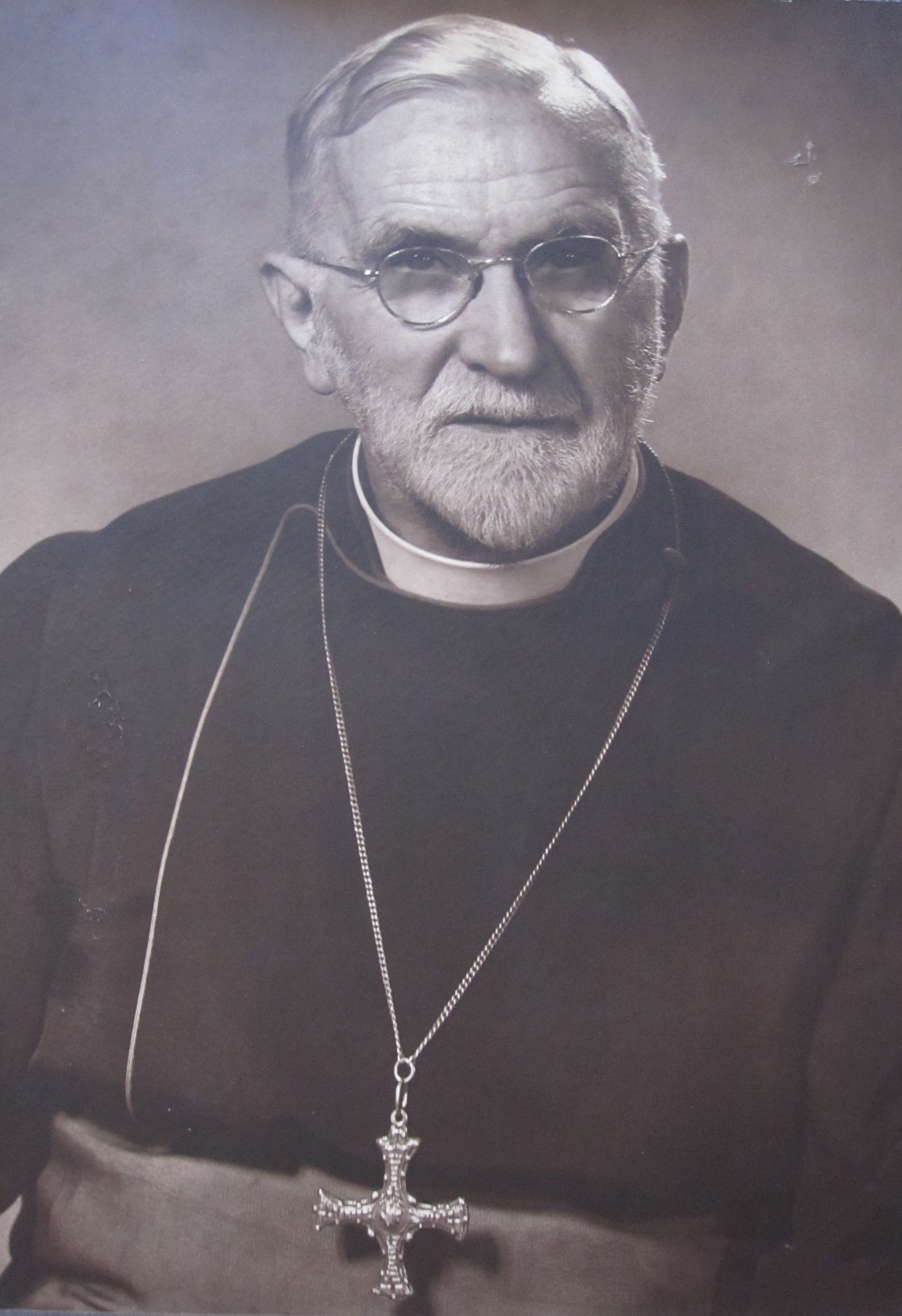
- Diocese: Calcutta

Personal details
- Born: 23 October 1863
- Died: 19 October 1949 (aged 85)
- Denomination: Anglican

Dr. Foss Westcott (23 October 1863 – 19 October 1949) was an English bishop.

Westcott was the son of a distinguished clergyman, Brooke Foss Westcott (and brother of George, Bishop of Lucknow) and was educated at Cheltenham College and Peterhouse, Cambridge. Ordained in 1887, his first post was as curate of St Peter's Church, Bishopwearmouth. Emigrating to India he was a Missionary with the SPG before ascending to the episcopate as Bishop of Chota Nagpore in 1905. Translated to Calcutta in 1919 he served as Metropolitan of India, Burma and Ceylon until 1945. In 1921 he saved 5 orphan girls from a flood-stricken area of West Bengal and brought them to Chota Nagpur which is now known as Namkom, Ranchi where he laid the foundation of the school namely Bishop Westcott Girls' School which is one of the best schools of eastern region. He retired to Darjeeling where he died. He was buried in the grounds of St. Paul's School, Darjeeling, a public school of which he had been the chairman of the board of directors for many years.
