= Bishop of St Albans =

Diocesan bishop in the Church of England

- Bishopric

anglican
- Incumbent; Rt Revd Andrew Rumsey

Location
- Ecclesiastical province: Canterbury
- Residence: Abbey Gate House, St Albans

Information
- Established: 1877
- Diocese: St Albans
- Cathedral: St Albans Cathedral

The Bishop of St Albans is the Ordinary of the Church of England's Diocese of St Albans in the Province of Canterbury. The bishop is supported in his work by two suffragan bishops, the Bishop of Hertford and the Bishop of Bedford, and three archdeacons.

The diocese covers the counties of Bedfordshire and Hertfordshire, as well as parts of the London Borough of Barnet and the western part of St Neots in Cambridgeshire. The see is in the City of St Albans in Hertfordshire, where the cathedra (bishop's seat) is located at St Albans Cathedral. The cathedral building itself was an abbey church (part of St Albans Abbey) prior to the Dissolution of the Monasteries. Following its purchase by the town in 1553, it was then a parish church until its elevation to cathedral status in 1877, when the diocese was created from the diocese of Rochester under Queen Victoria by the Bishopric of St. Albans Act 1875.

== Incumbent ==
The last incumbent was Alan Smith, 10th Bishop of St Albans, who signs + Alan St Albans. His nomination was announced by Downing Street on 13 January 2009, following the retirement of Christopher Herbert. Smith's election as bishop by the College of Canons of the Cathedral took place on 13 February and his Confirmation of Election with the Archbishop of Canterbury Rowan Williams followed on 31 March, at which point he legally took office as bishop. Smith was enthroned on 19 September 2009 and officially retired on the 31 May 2025.

On 19 March 2026, it was announced that the next Bishop of St Albans would be Andrew Rumsey, currently serving as Suffragan Bishop of Ramsbury in the Diocese of Salisbury.

The Bishop's residence is the Abbey Gate House, St Albans.

== List of bishops ==
Bishops of St Albans
From	Until	Incumbent	Notes
1877	1890	Thomas Legh Claughton	Translated from Rochester; nominated on 30 May and invested on 12 July 1877; resigned on 21 March 1890 and died on 25 July 1892
1890	1902	John Festing	Nominated on 10 June and consecrated on 24 June 1890; died in office on 28 December 1902
1903	1920	Edgar Jacob	Translated from Newcastle; nominated on 11 May 1903; resigned in December 1919 and died on 25 March 1920
1920	1944	Michael Furse	Translated from Pretoria, South Africa; nominated on 28 January and invested on 19 April 1920; resigned on 1 September 1944 and died on 18 June 1955
1944	1950	Philip Loyd	Translated from Nasik, India; nominated on 13 October and confirmed on 14 December 1944; resigned on 1 May 1950 and died on 11 January 1952
1950	1969	Michael Gresford Jones	Translated from Willesden; nominated on 23 January and confirmed on 25 July 1950; resigned on 16 December 1969 and died on 7 March 1982
1970	1980	Robert Runcie	Nominated on 10 January and consecrated on 24 February 1970; translated to Canterbury on 25 February 1980 and died on 11 July 2000
1980	1995	John Taylor	Nominated on 5 March and consecrated on 1 May 1980; also Lord High Almoner (1988–1997); retired in 1995 and died on 1 June 2016
1995	2009	Christopher Herbert	Nominated and consecrated in 1995; retired on 7 January 2009.
2009	2025	Alan Smith	Translated from Shrewsbury; nominated on 13 January, elected on 13 February and inaugurated on 19 September 2009; retired 31 May 2025.
2025	acting	Richard Atkinson, Bishop of Bedford	Acting diocesan bishop since 1 June 2025.
2026		Andrew Rumsey	Bishop designate as of March 2026

== Assistant bishops ==
Among those who have served as assistant bishops in the diocese are:

- 1914 – 1924 (ret.): Noel Hodges, former Bishop of Travancore and Cochin and Assistant Bishop of Durham and of Ely
- 1924 – 1934 (d.): Gerard Lander, Vicar of Holy Trinity New Barnet (until 1933), Archdeacon of Bedford (after 1933), and former Bishop of Victoria
- 1942 – 1951 (ret.): Bernard Heywood, Canon Residentiary of St Albans Abbey and retired Bishop of Ely
- 1961–1968 (res.): John Boys, Canon of St Albans and former Bishop of Kimberley and Kuruman

== Bibliography ==
- Fryde, E. B.; Greenway, D. E.; Porter, S.; Roy, I., eds. (1986). Handbook of British Chronology (3rd, reprinted 2003 ed.). Cambridge: Cambridge University Press. ISBN 0-521-56350-X.
- Whitaker's Almanack 1883 to 2004, Joseph Whitaker and Sons Ltd/A&C Black, London.
