= Philip Loyd =

Philip Henry Loyd (8 July 1884 – 11 January 1952) was an eminent Anglican Bishop and author, in the second quarter of the 20th century. He was educated at Eton and King's College, Cambridge and ordained in 1911. His first post was as a Curate at St Mary of Eton, Hackney Wick after which he was Vice-Principal of Ripon College Cuddesdon. From 1915 to 1944 he served the church in India rising in time to be Bishop of Nasik. In that year he was translated to St Albans where he served the Episcopate for a further six years.

== Notes ==
Religious titles
Preceded by Inaugural appointment	Bishop of Nasik; 1929–1944	Succeeded by Henry Read
Preceded by Michael Furse	Bishop of St Albans; 1944–1950	Succeeded by Michael Gresford Jones
