= Board of guardians =

Bodies that administered Poor Law in the UK

Boards of guardians were ad hoc authorities that administered Poor Law in the United Kingdom from 1835 to 1930.

== England and Wales ==
Boards of guardians were created by the Poor Law Amendment Act 1834, replacing the parish overseers of the poor established under the old poor law, following the recommendations of the Poor Law Commission. Boards administered workhouses within a defined poor law union consisting of a group of parishes, either by order of the Poor Law Commission, or by the common consent of the parishes. Once a union was established it could not be dissolved or merged with a neighbouring union without the consent of its board.

Each board was composed of guardians elected by the owners and bona fide occupiers of land liable to pay the poor rate. Depending on the value of the property held, an elector could cast from one to three votes. Electors could nominate proxies to cast their vote in their absence. Where property was held by a corporation or company, its governing body could nominate an officer to cast its vote or votes.

Each civil parish in the union was represented by at least one guardian, with those with larger populations or special circumstances having two or more. The exact constitution of each board was determined by the Poor Law Commissioners.

Guardians were subject to annual elections. In addition to the elected guardians, any justice of the peace residing in a parish of the union was entitled to be an ex officio guardian.

It was long unclear whether women were permitted to win election to boards of guardians. In 1875, Martha Merington was accepted as a candidate for the Kensington Board of Guardians, and was successful. Her election was upheld, although there was much opposition. She was disqualified after winning a further election in 1879 as she was moving house on the election day and so it was uncertain whether she technically met the property ownership requirements at that moment. In Ashton-under-Lyne, Bertha Mason was the first woman to be elected to the board and served until she moved to London in 1904.

By the Public Health Act 1875 (38 & 39 Vict. c. 55), boards of guardians became rural sanitary authorities for all areas outside a municipal borough or town with a local board.

The Local Government Act 1894 altered the system; members of newly established rural district councils became guardians for their areas, with poor law elections being limited to urban areas. At the same time, property qualifications were abolished, plural voting was ended and women were able to become guardians. The term of office of a guardian was increased to three years, with all guardians elected, and no ex officio or nominated board members. Boards were, however, permitted to co-opt a chairman, vice-chairman and up to two additional members from outside their own body, provided that they were qualified to be a guardian in a like manner to the elected members.

Boards of guardians were abolished in 1930 by the Local Government Act 1929, when their powers and responsibilities passed to local and national government bodies, including public assistance committees. Douglas Veale, private secretary to Neville Chamberlain, discussed their abolition, and Chamberlain's work on this, in an interview given to the historian, Brian Harrison, in February 1969 as part of the Suffrage Interviews project, titled Oral evidence on the suffragette and suffragist movements: the Brian Harrison interviews.

== Ireland ==
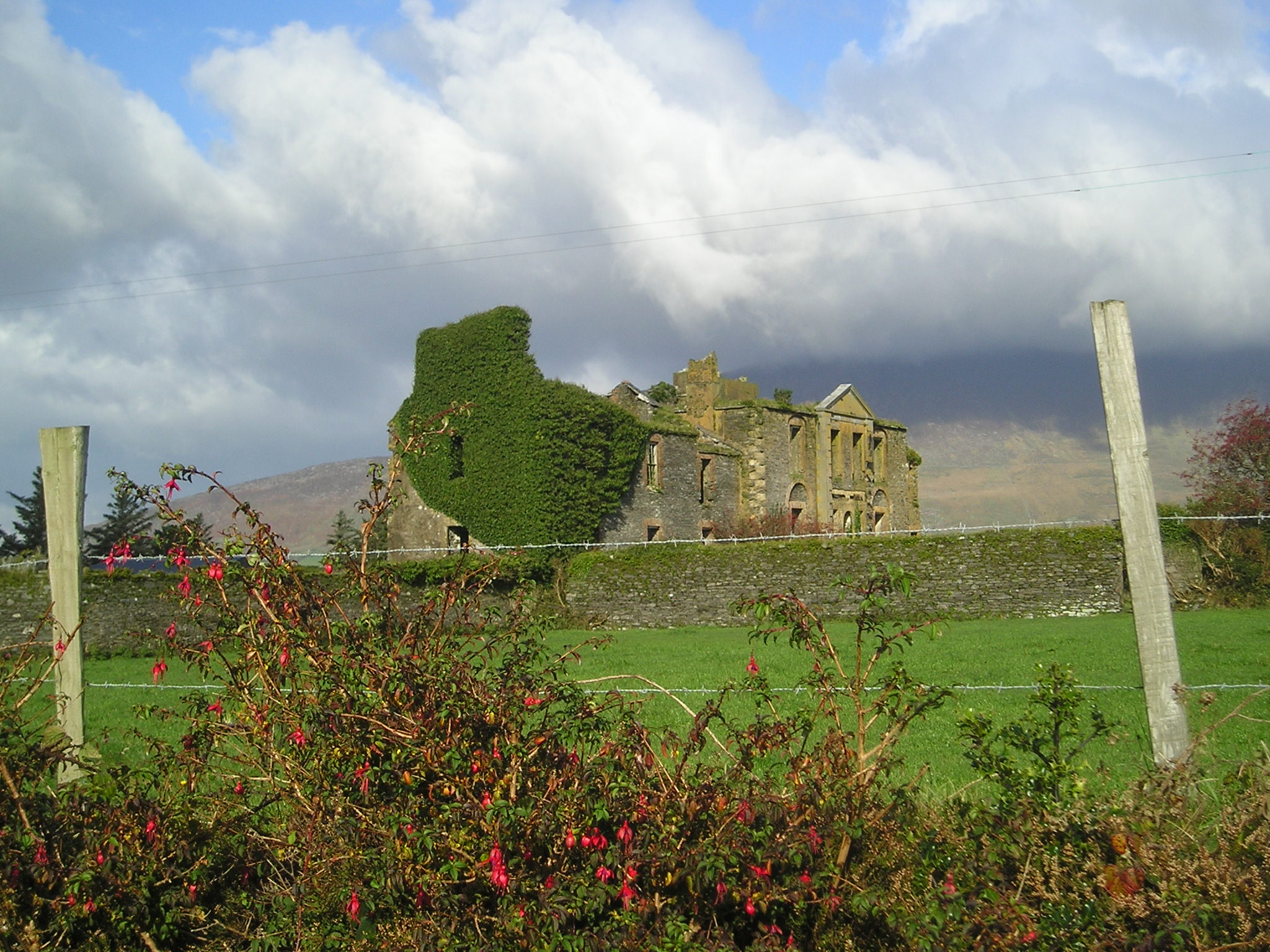
Workhouse ruin near Cahirciveen.

A similar system of Poor Law to that in England and Wales was introduced to Ireland in 1838, with boards of guardians elected by rate-payers. The Irish system differed from that in England and Wales, as the civil parish was not used as the basis for the election of guardians. In their place electoral divisions were formed by the agglomeration of townlands. The ratio of elected to ex officio guardians was to be at least three to one, with an election to be held among the qualified magistrates for ex officio positions if their number exceeded the limit.

Following the partition of the island in 1922 the guardians were abolished in the Irish Free State in 1925, being replaced by county boards of health. Guardians continued to exist until 1948 in Northern Ireland.

== Scotland ==
Under the reformed system introduced in Scotland in 1845, relief of the poor was the responsibility of parochial boards appointed in each civil parish, and boards of guardians were not formed. Adjacent parishes could form "combinations", however, to administer workhouses.
