= Peter Hullah =

British former Anglican bishop (born 1949

- Bishop of Ramsbury
- Diocese: Salisbury
- In office: 1999–2005
- Predecessor: Peter Vaughan
- Successor: Stephen Conway
- Other posts: Regional executive director, United Learning Trust (2009–2011)

Orders
- Ordination: c. 1974 (deacon); c. 1975 (priest)
- Consecration: 1999

Personal details
- Born: 7 May 1949 (age 77)
- Denomination: Anglican
- Parents: Ralph & Mary
- Spouse: Hilary Long (m. 1971; div. 2008); Penny (div.); Anne
- Children: 2
- Profession: Bishop and headmaster
- Education: King's College London

Peter Fearnley Hullah (born 7 May 1949) is a British former Anglican bishop who was Bishop of Ramsbury.

== Education and ministry ==
Hullah was educated at Bradford Grammar School and King's College London. He was ordained in 1974 and was a curate at St Michael and All Angels, Summertown, Oxford, and then chaplain (from 1978) and housemaster of the International Centre (1982-1985) at Sevenoaks School, chaplain of The King's School, Canterbury and headmaster of Chetham's School of Music before being ordained to the episcopate. He was Bishop of Ramsbury from 1999 to 2005 when he became principal of the Northampton Academy. He is now director of Hopeful Leadership Ltd and a consultant to various charities including Together for Sudan.

== Chetham's School of Music sex abuse scandal ==
When Hullah was headteacher of Chetham’s School of Music (1992–1999), he witnessed Michael Brewer, the school's director of music, sexually abusing a pupil, but chose to deal with the incident by announcing that Brewer had taken early retirement on the grounds of ill health in order to preserve the reputation of the school and the perpetrator.

Brewer was paid his full salary from when he left Chetham’s in December 1994 until August 1995, which Hullah considered to be a gesture of goodwill on the part of the governing body. Brewer continued to be associated with Chetham’s as an advisor and to work closely with young people as the artistic director of the National Youth Choir. Hullah did not notify the National Youth Choir, the local authority or the Department for Education (which at that time operated List 99, a barred list of those deemed unsuitable to work with children) of the circumstances or the fact of Brewer's resignation, although there was a statutory duty to notify the Department for Education of such resignations. Hullah did not consider that the circumstances of Brewer's resignation were such as to require any referrals or notification.

== Under clergy discipline for historic misconduct ==
Following complaints of sexual misconduct against him, Hullah was seen before a bishop's tribunal in 2022. He pleaded guilty and subsequently the Archbishop of Canterbury imposed the penalty of "prohibition for life" from exercising any ministerial functions in the Church of England.

== Role in the City of London ==
Hullah became the master of the Worshipful Company of Woolmen in September 2022.

Church of England titles
| Preceded by Peter Vaughan | Bishop of Ramsbury; 1999–2005 | Succeeded by Stephen Conway |
