= Martha Merington =

British politician (1831–1912)

Martha Crawford Merington (21 January 1831 – 2 September 1912) was a British politician, notable as the first woman to serve as a Poor Law Guardian.

Born in Islington, Merington was the daughter of Margaret and Richard Whiskin Merington, her father being a deputy principal at the Bank of England. She continued to live with her parents into her forties, and became involved in the movement for women to take up elected public posts. In 1872, she joined the Chelsea divisional committee of the London School Board, the committee focusing on encouraging school attendance. Other members of the committee included Emily Shirreff and Mary Anne Donkin. Throwing herself into education, Merington became the manager of three schools in Notting Hill, and also established creches for the babies of working women.

Merington stood for the Kensington Board of Guardians in 1875. Unusually, her candidacy was accepted, and she went to the poll. She received 3,893 votes, which saw her elected as the last of eighteen representatives. She was the first woman to serve as a Poor Law Guardian, and was very active in her duties. She served on a local relief committee, as a visitor to the local workhouse and its infirmary, and six months later joined a new committee which visited local schools and asylums. She also produced a report criticising conditions at a school in Herne Bay, where some Kensington children had been sent, and reorganised the staffing of the workhouse infirmary, producing significant savings.

Merington stood again in the 1877 elections, and received an improved vote, taking the twelfth of the eighteen seats. Thereafter, she rarely attended board meetings, but continued as a very active visitor to the schools and infirmary. She again faced re-election in 1879, but was moving house on election day. One local ratepayer challenged her election, claiming that she was ineligible as she did not technically meet the property requirements on the day of election, and the court disqualified her.

Merington supported women standing in the 1879 London School Board elections, and offered advice on how the board should run Upton House, its school for truants. She did not re-enter public life, but later became a private language tutor, living in Croydon and then in Wimbledon, where she died in 1912.
