= Diocese of Nasik (Church of North India) =

Location
- Country: India

Information
- Denomination: Church of North India
- Rite: CNI

Current leadership
- Bishop: Kamble Pradip

The Diocese of Nasik is a diocese of Church of North India headquartered in the city of Nashik.

== Bishops ==
The Bishop of Nasik was the Ordinary of the Anglican Diocese of Nasik from its inception in 1929 until the foundation of the Church in India, Pakistan, Burma and Ceylon in 1927. Since then, the Bishop of Nasik has been the head of one of the dioceses of the united church.

Tenure	Incumbent	Notes
1929–1944	Philip Loyd	Translated to St Albans
1944–1957	Henry Cecil Read	Formerly Archdeacon of Aurangabad (now called Chhatrapati Sambhajinagar)
1957–1970	Arthur William Luther	First Indian born bishop of diocese
1970–1994	Jonathan Vairagar	
1994–1999	George Ninan	Began the partnership with the Diocese of Derby
1999 -	Kamble Pradip	Current incumbent

== See also ==
- Christianity in India
- Church of North India
