= Christopher Robinson (bishop) =

English bishop (1903–1988)

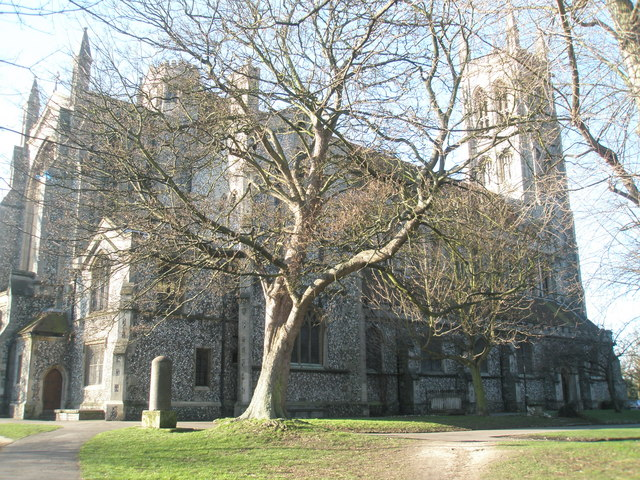
St Mary's Church, Portsea

Christopher James Gossage Robinson (10 June 1903 – 24 February 1988) was Bishop of Lucknow from 1947 to 1962, when he was translated to be the Bishop of Bombay until his retirement in 1970.

Robinson was born into a distinguished family and educated at Marlborough College and Christ's College, Cambridge,

After graduating in 1926 he went to India to be on the teaching staff of St Stephen's College, Delhi. He returned to England in 1929 to be ordained.

His first appointment was as a Curate at St Mary's Portsea, after which he returned to India, where he was a leading light in the Cambridge Mission to Delhi, (Vicar of St James's Delhi, then of St Thomas'd New Delhi) until his ordination to the episcopate.

He retired to Delhi in 1970. He had never married.

Church of England titles
| Preceded by Sydney Alfred Bill | Bishop of Lucknow; 1947–1962 | Succeeded by Joseph Amritanand |
| Preceded by William Quinlan Lash | Bishop of Bombay; 1962–1970 | Succeeded by Arthur William Luther |

== Notes ==
- Beeson, Trevor. Priests and Prelates: The Daily Telegraph Clerical Obituaries – The Right Reverend Christopher Robinson. Google Books
