= Petertide =

Petertide (also known as St Peter's Tide) refers to the Sunday nearest to St Peter's Day on 29 June and to the period around that day.

In Anglicanism, Petertide is one of two major traditional periods for the ordination of new priests (the other being Michaelmas, around 29 September).

Around Penzance in west Cornwall, the period has long been celebrated by Midsummer bonfires and sometimes the burning of effigies of unpopular residents. The feast at Mevagissey is celebrated on 29 June; though the church there was once dedicated to St Meva and St Issey it is now dedicated to St Peter (whose trade was that of a fisherman).

== See also ==
- Golowan Festival
