= Diocese of Lucknow (Church of North India) =

Diocese of Church of India headquartered in Lucknow, Uttar Pradesh

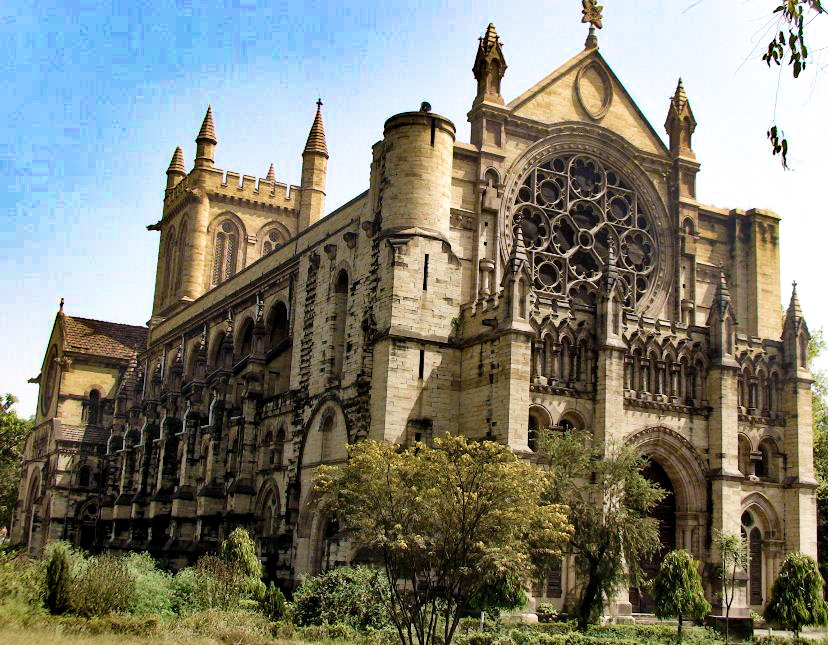

Location
- Country: India
- Territory: Eastern Uttar Pradesh
- Deaneries: Lucknow, Jhansi, Prayagraj, Lakhimpur, Gorakhpur, Varanasi, Mirzapur, Saharanpur
- Headquarters: Prayagraj, Uttar Pradesh

Statistics
- Parishes: 73+
- Congregations: 73+
- Schools: 40+ schools
- Members: 22000+

Information
- Denomination: (CNI)
- Cathedral: All Saints Cathedral
- Patron saint: All canonized Saints before English Reformation
- Language: English, Hindi

Current leadership
- Bishop of Diocese of Lucknow: Rt. Rev. Morris Edgar Dan

Website
- Diocese of Lucknow

The Diocese of Lucknow is a diocese of the Church of North India, headquartered in Prayagraj. Its jurisdiction mainly covers the eastern side of Uttar Pradesh.

== History ==
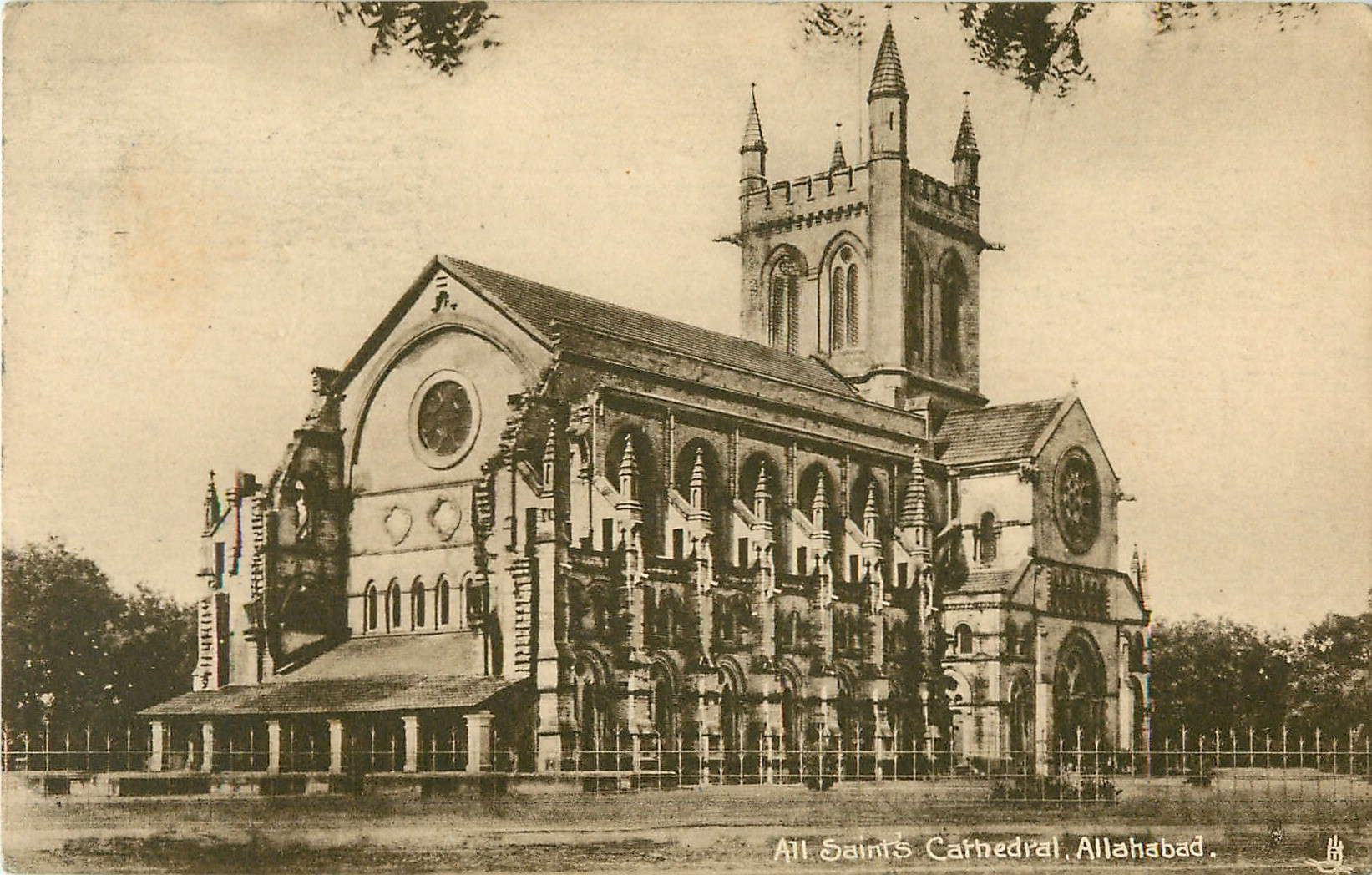

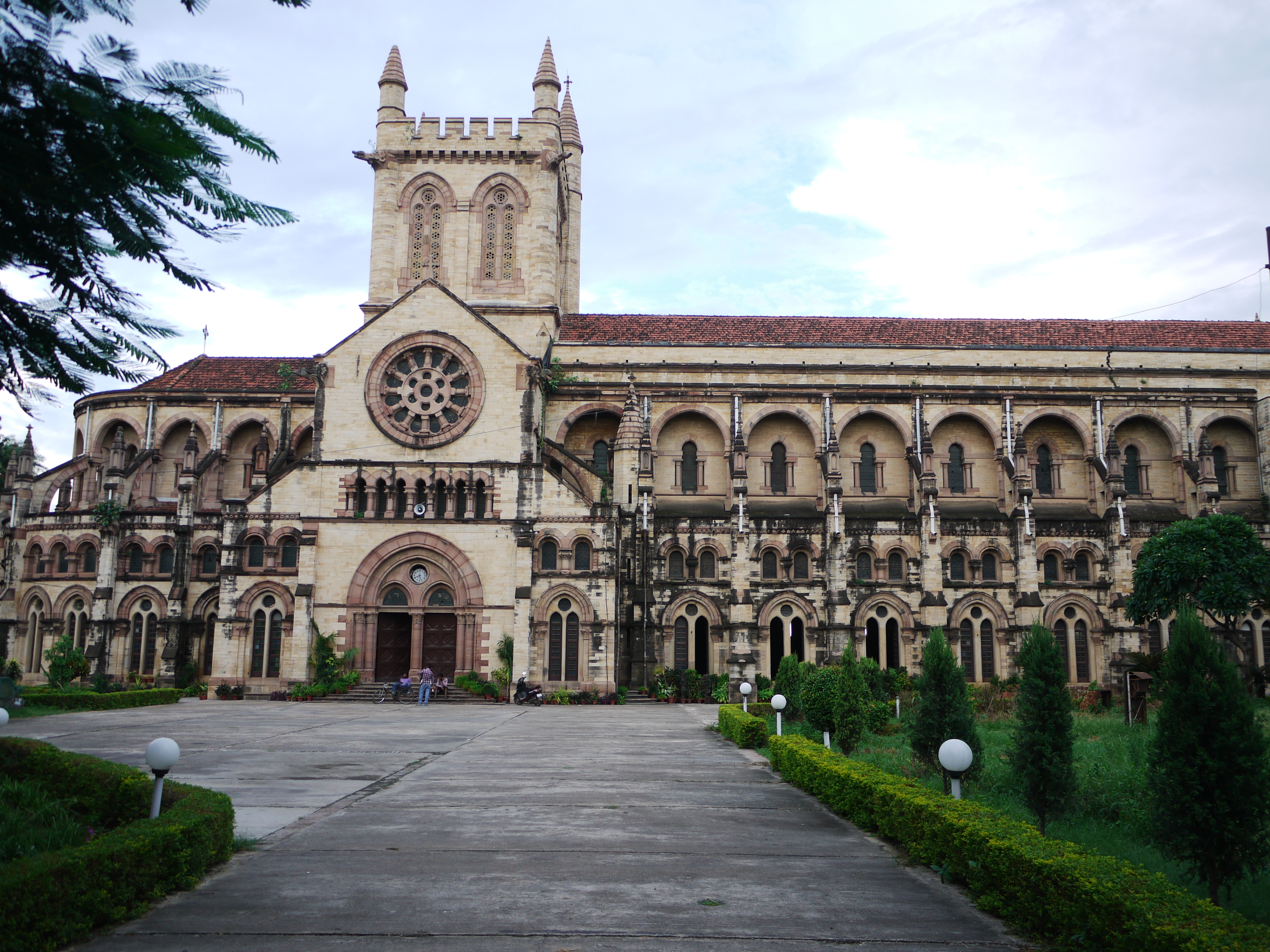

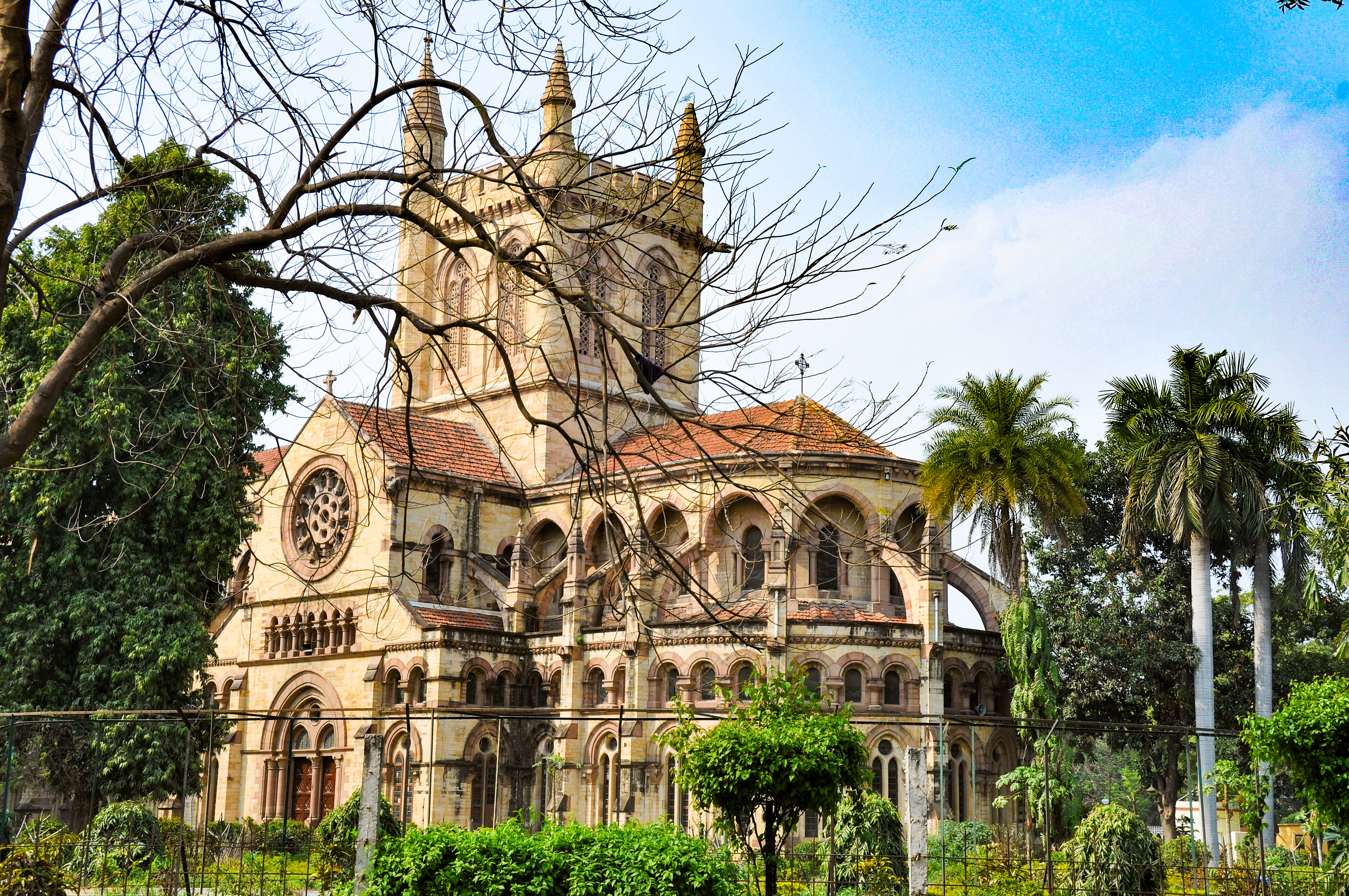

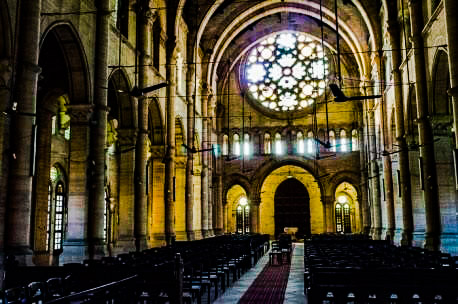

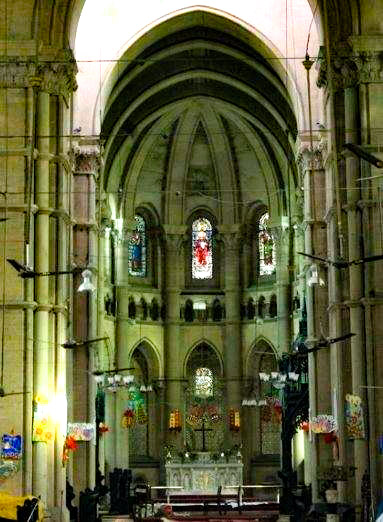

The diocese of Lucknow was established in 1893 by carving it out from the Diocese of Calcutta. The diocese was given the name of Lucknow, although the mother Cathedral, All Saints Cathedral, and the diocesan headquarters stayed in Prayagraj. This was because Prayagraj was situated within the legally defined territories of the diocese of Calcutta. It is the biggest Diocese in Uttar Pradesh and one of the oldest dioceses of the Church of North India.

== Bishops ==
The Bishop of Lucknow was the Ordinary of the Anglican Diocese of Lucknow from its inception in 1893 until the foundation of the Church in India, Pakistan, Burma and Ceylon in 1927 and its consequent merger with other Protestant Churches to form the Church of India in 1927; and since then head of one of the united church's biggest dioceses.

- Late Rt. Rev. Lord Alfred Clifford 1893–1910
- Late Most. Rev. Lord George Westcott 1910–1928
- Late Rt. Rev. Lord Charles Saunders 1928–1938
- Late Rt. Rev. Lord Sydney Bill 1939–1947
- Late Rt. Rev. Lord Christopher Robinson 1947–1962

Church of India

- Late Rt. Rev. Lord Joseph Amritanand 1962–1970
- Late Most Rev. Lord Deen Dayal 1970–1976
- Late Rt. Rev. Raja Yousef
- Rt. Rev. Anil R. Stephen
- Rt. Rev. Samuel P. Praksh
- Late Rt. Rev. Dr. Colin Christopher Theodore – Moderator's Episcopal Commissary
- Rev. Daniel Subhan – Moderator's Commissary
- Rt. Rev. Dr. Peter Baldev – Sent on long leave w.e.f. June, 2022
- Rt. Rev. Manoj Charan - Moderator's Episcopal Commissary - Resigned
- Rt. Rev. Andrew Rathod - Moderator's Episcopal Commissary
- Rt. Rev. Morris Edgar Dan
