= Multiple religious belonging =

Idea that individuals can belong to more than one religious tradition

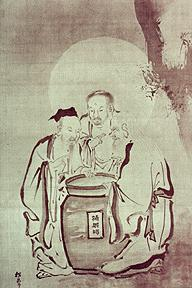
A traditional representation of The Vinegar Tasters, an allegorical image representing Buddha, Confucius, and Laozi

Multiple religious belonging, also known as double belonging, refers to the idea that individuals can belong to more than one religious tradition. While this is often seen as a common reality in regions such as Asia with its many non-exclusionary religions (such as Hinduism, Buddhism, Taoism, and Confucianism), religious scholars have begun to discuss multiple religion belonging with respect to religious traditions such as Judaism, Christianity, and Islam.

Those who practice double belonging claim to be an adherent of two different religions at the same time or incorporate the practices of another religion into their own faith life. It is increasing with globalisation. One such example is a person attending a Christian church but also finding meaning in yoga and in forms of meditation inspired by Eastern traditions, and enjoying attending a Jewish Seder at Passover.

The phenomenon of double belonging can occur within the same religion, where people hold membership in more than one religious denomination, for example a Christian who is a church member of both the Catholic Church and the Religious Society of Friends. In the United States, nearly half of practicing Christians (46%) attend more than one church. The participation of Christians in church services of another denomination is seen as an expression of Christian ecumenism. In Christian monasticism, certain monasteries of one denomination accept oblates of the various Christian denominations that exist; for example, The Congregation of the Servants of Christ at St. Augustine’s House in Michigan, a Lutheran monastery, accepts Christian oblates who are Lutheran, as well as non-Lutheran. Certain church buildings are shared by two Christian denominations, such as the Cathedral of St Peter in Bautzen, which is shared by the Lutheran Church and the Catholic Church; both Lutherans and Catholics there will often worship together on occasions such as the New Year's Eve watchnight Mass.

== Context ==
In some religions, such as Judaism, Christianity, and Islam, those who hold an exclusivist understanding of religion see multiple religious affiliations as problematic. This is in contrast with religious persons in countries such as China, Japan, Korea, Vietnam, India, Nepal, and Sri Lanka, whose cultures have a long history of being influenced by different religions. Moreover, in the postmodernity, people tend to question their identity because of the unlimited choices of religions, which makes it difficult to define their identity.

Van Bragt showed that 79% of Japanese self-identify as Shintoists and 75% self-identify as Buddhists. The reason for the extremely high percentage of both religions is that many Japanese consider themselves to be both Shintoists and Buddhists and do not consider it a problem to belong to more than one religion. (Whether this statistic is correct is arguable. (Note: According to Mark R. Mullins's figures, there are only 30–33% of Japanese who consider themselves as having "personal faith", while others usually see themselves as "without religion" (mushukyo). For further discussions, see Mullins 2011, pp. 197–198.)) This phenomenon, according to Van Bragt, is a "division of labour". Van Bragt argued that the cause of this phenomenon is that, different from the Western concept of religion, Shinto and Buddhism in Japan are defined by their rituals and practices, not by their moral and social authority. (Note: According to Van Bragt, while Buddhism and Shinto govern the rituals and practices of Japanese, Confucianism is regarded as the authority for morality and the source of principles of social life.) Thus, the Japanese can belong to several religions that do not conflict with each other in terms of social and ethical issues.

Scholars such as Catherine Cornille, Peter C. Phan, Francis Xavier Clooney, Jan Van Bragt, Aloysius Pieris, and Devaka Premawardhana have questioned the possibility of defining oneself as belonging to multiple religions. For these scholars, "religious belonging" is not an individual's subjective sense of a particular religion but rather, in Cornille's words, "the recognition of one's religious identity by the tradition itself and the disposition to submit to the conditions for membership as delineated by that tradition." For Cornille, the ultimate purpose of a scholarly discussion on multiple religious belonging is to transform one's religion through the understanding of other religions.

== Types of approaches ==
Based on Van Bragt's study, scholars have investigated the possibility that adherents of a religion such as Christianity may belong to multiple religions. The approach to Christian multiple religious belonging, according to Devaka Premawardhana, can be divided into two trends: Peter C. Phan's approach based on Christological grounds, in which he emphasises on Jesus's "asymmetrically superior status", and Francis Xavier Clooney's approach rooted in a methodological ground, which tries to cross boundaries into another religion just as religions must have discrete entities. These two approaches are summarised below.

=== Christological approach ===
Phan's approach emphasised the assymmetricality in which Jesus is the Logos made flesh and the climax of God dealing with humankind. In an attempt to resonate with one's cultural identity and tradition, Phan explained that multiple religious belonging is necessary for practitioners of multiple belonging to treat other religions as a qualifier of their identity. This approach, according to Phan, does not deny one's Christian identity, which functions substantively alongside non-Christian religions. Phan noted that multiple religious belonging is not a new issue in the twenty-first century but rather the common form of life of the first-century Christians—whom at the time were predominantly Jewish Christians—recorded in the book of Acts. In Phan's view, the disappearance of this trend was "a tragic loss to both Judaism and Christianity", because it led to a subsequent history of bitter hatred, especially from the side of Christianity.

=== Methodological approach ===
As a comparative theologian, Clooney writes about the diversity in the world nowadays, especially with respect to the flourishing of different religions. For Clooney, reflecting on one's religion in this pluralistic world is necessary, so that we can "see the others in light of our own, and our own in light of the other." Focusing on the study of scriptural and theological texts, Clooney compares them between Christian traditions and non-Christian religions, to "cross boundaries" to other traditions, so that one would rethink their own theology, which would thus shape their identity. After more than 40 years of studying Hinduism, Clooney concluded that he finds the distinctive disciplines of theology and Hinduism are "mutually enriching". By applying this approach, according to Clooney, one can start within their "home" tradition, enter a different tradition and return to their tradition, which is enriched and reformulated after crossing boundaries.

== Challenges and controversy ==
While scholars studying multiple religious belonging seek to appreciate other religions' traditions alongside their own, the conservative segment of Christianity tends to question the inclusivistic view of multiple religious belonging because it implies that salvation can be found elsewhere than in Jesus. (Note: For definitions of traditional typology such as exclusivism and inclusivism, see Migliore 2004, pp. 306–307.) In a 2010 article, Veli-Matti Kärkkäinen, a systematic theologian, questioned the approach of "othering" those who have traditions different from Christians' because God is the one who offers salvation; Christians, among other religious persons, only witness it. It is out of humility that Christians can say that salvation belongs to God, and God only, in Kärkkäinen's view. On the other hand, scholars studying multiple religious belonging such as John B. Cobb see this as an opportunity rather than a threat: "I do not see multiple religious belonging as the primary way into the future. The primary way is the transformation of the particular religious traditions, at least in the Christian case, through their new encounter with other traditions." For Cobb, engaging in interfaith dialogue helps smooth the tension between Christianity and Judaism and avoid misunderstanding toward Islam.

In a 2017 article, sociologist Steve Bruce pointed out that most of the published writings in which multiple religious belonging is studied are purely conceptual and offer "only anecdotes to illustrate theoretical or classificatory discussions". Bruce argued that the few attempts to gather empirical data on the phenomenon have conflated a variety of different attitudes that should not be given the label of "multiple religious belonging", attitudes such as: universalistic re-interpretation of multiple religions, multiple religious association through family ties, multiple religious interest or sympathies, ancillary religious respect for a specific aspect of a religion, and secular equal respect for all religions. Bruce argued that the term "multiple religious belonging" should be strictly confined to being "an observant 'member' of more than one religion (religion here meaning such high level abstractions as Christianity, Islam, Hinduism, Sikhism, Buddhism etc)", and since most religions have strict requirements for and expectations of observant members, sociologists should expect multiple religious belonging, defined in this way, to be "remarkably rare".

== See also ==
- Christianity and other religions
- Jewish Buddhist
- Religious liberalism
- Religious pluralism
- Syncretism
- Theology of religions
