= Gavin D'Costa =

British Catholic theologian and professor (born 1958)

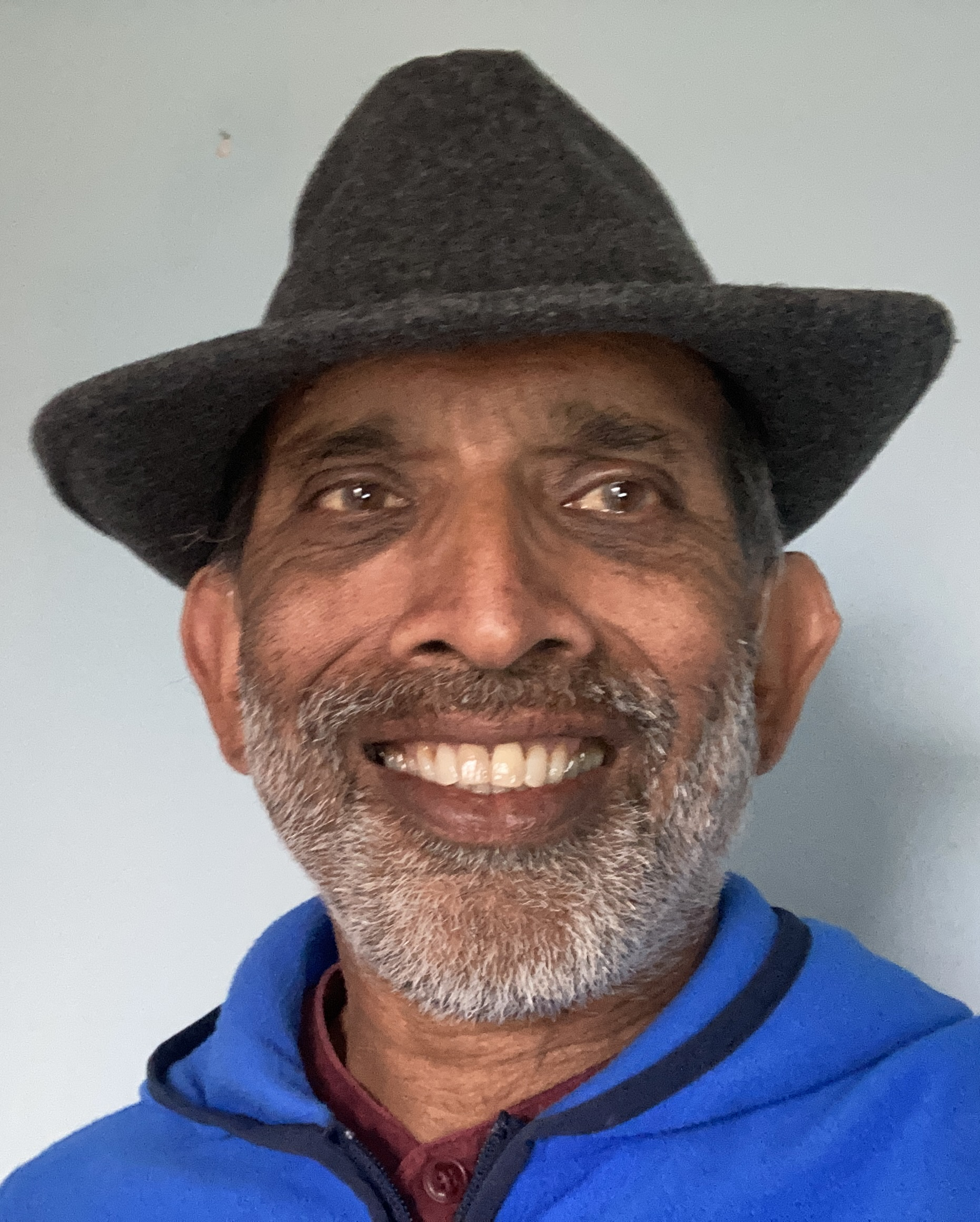
- Portrait of D'Costa
- Born: 1958 (age 67–68); Nairobi, Kenya
- Occupations: Emeritus Professor of Catholic theology at the University of Bristol; Visiting Professor at the Pontifical University of Saint Thomas Aquinas, Rome

Academic background
- Education: University of Birmingham, University of Cambridge
- Influences: John Hick, Karl Rahner, Karl Barth, George Lindbeck, Avery Dulles

Gavin D'Costa (born 1958) is the Emeritus Professor of Catholic Theology at the University of Bristol. His academic career at Bristol began in 1993. D'Costa was appointed a visiting professor of Inter-religious Dialogue at the Pontifical University of Saint Thomas Aquinas, Rome.

== Biography ==
D'Costa was born in Kenya and immigrated to Great Britain in 1968. He was educated at Goldington Junior School in Bedford, and afterwards at Bedford Modern School. He went on to study English & Theology at the University of Birmingham under the theologian John Hick. After graduating, he studied at the University of Cambridge before teaching at the West London Institute, Bristol University, and at the Pontifical University of Saint Thomas Aquinas, Rome. His research interests include systematic theology, theology of interreligious dialogue, Roman Catholic modern theology, the Second Vatican Council and Jewish-Catholic dialogue.

In 1998, he was a visiting professor at Rome's Gregorian University of the Jesuit Order. In 2020–2021 he was a visiting professor at Rome's Angelicum, Pontifical University of the Dominican Order. He has also worked on the Church of England and Roman Catholic Committees on Other Faiths, advising these communities on theological issues. He also advises the Pontifical Council for Other Faiths, Vatican City.

D'Costa has published his poetry in a joint collection, Making Nothing Happen (2013), and has had his poetry set to music by composer John Pickard.

== Theological publications ==
D’Costa’s first book, Theology and Religious Pluralism (1986) followed Alan Race and developed the threefold typology of pluralism, inclusivism, and exclusivism regarding the Christian theological approach to other religions. He examined the work of key representatives of each of these positions: John Hick as a pluralist, Karl Rahner as an inclusivist, and Hendrik Kraemer as an exclusivist. D’Costa defended Rahner's inclusivism that held to the universal love of God for all people as well as the necessity of Christ's grace for salvation. The combination of these two axioms allowed that other religions could be, in principle, mediations of the saving grace of Jesus Christ. D’Costa argues that pluralism only emphasized the universal love of God and that exclusivism only emphasizes the necessity of belief in Christ for salvation.

D’Costa has been a persistent critic of John Hick’s pluralism approach. In his doctoral work, John Hick’s Theology of Religions (1987), he tried to show that Hick’s claim that all religions lead to the same divine reality was problematic on three counts. First, it went against the orthodox claims of Christian theology. Second, Hick’s claim could only be sustained if all religions were re-interpreted, thus requiring that all religions conform to his demand that they abandon ultimate ontological convictions. Third, D’Costa tried to show that pluralism was internally incoherent, because it makes a privileged claim for its own position as the greatest truth.

In his next work, The Meeting of Religions and the Trinity (2000), D'Costa shifts his attention towards exclusivism. He argues that there is no such position as pluralism; pluralism is technically a disguised form of exclusivism, either religious (as in the case of the Dalai Lama, in his study of modern Tibetan Buddhism, or in the case of Sarvapelli Radhakrishnan, the modern proponent of Advaita neo-Hinduism), or a form of modernity (in the case of Hick and the Roman Catholic theologian Paul F. Knitter, and the Jewish theologian, Dan Cohn-Sherbok). Hence, these positions advocate that all religions are equal, but actually have an explicitly religious exclusivism (in the case of the Dalai Lama, there is no liberation until one has become a De Lug Buddhist monk), but one has endless lifetimes to achieve this; likewise for Radhakrishnan, but in this case (a non-dual Advaitin experience of moksha is required for final release from the cycle of birth and death), or a secular modern exclusivism (an ethical rule, that derives from Kant and stands in judgment upon all religions). D’Costa defends a trinitarian approach to other religions that refuses to see them as equal or provisional/imperfect forms of revelation or salvific means; nevertheless, he acknowledges the grace of God operative within these traditions in a fragmentary and inchoate manner. He relies heavily on the work of Alasdair MacIntyre and John Milbank.

D'Costa develops this position in his Theology in the Public Square (2005) in relation to the importance of Christian theology taking a decisive public stance and developing a public voice, the latter mainly through the idea of a Christian University.

In Christianity and the World Religions: Disputed Questions in the Theology of Religions (2009), D'Costa addresses four disputed questions in the field of theology of religions. He argues for a form of "exclusivism", although he criticizes the categories of pluralism, inclusivism, and exclusivism. He calls into question the prevailing definition of "religion", arguing that it is part of modernity's narrative and serves a certain rhetorical strategy related to the privatising of religion, and its reduction to cultic ritual acts robbed of their social and political significance. He explores how Islam and Catholic Christianity might better contribute to the religious public voice and strengthen real debate in the public square, claiming that they might better preserve religious plurality than secular liberalism. Finally, he explores the doctrine of hell and the circles within it.

In Vatican II: Catholic Doctrines on Jews and Muslims (2014), D'Costa turns to the authoritative Conciliar documents of the Catholic Church to establish what doctrines of God and God's activity are to be found that relate specifically to Judaism and Islam. He defends the view that the documents are either novel, continuous, and reforming, but not discontinuous with previous doctrinal teachings. D'Costa argues that invincible ignorance was crucial in moving to a positive attitude to other religions since they were no longer seen to explicitly and knowingly reject Catholic truth. He examines the drafts of Lumen Gentium 14–16 and Nostra Aetate 3–4 to show the positive doctrinal foundations for dialogue. He rebuts the charge of Jewish deicide and the alleged guilt of the Jewish people, while acknowledging the Jewish foundations of Christianity. In relation to Islam, there is a distance from the views of Louis Massignon, while at the same time an affirmation of a creator God who is the final judge. This theistic commonality is the crown of the Council's teaching, but gained at the cost of not mentioning the Qur'an and Muhammad. From this doctrinal basis, D'Costa indicates some of the postconciliar theological developments that have followed are from the Council.

In Catholic Doctrines on the Jewish People After Vatican II (2019), D'Costa continues his study of 2014 to trace the doctrinal trajectories related to three central questions regarding the status of Judaism. He establishes the Catholic Church's formal move away from supersessionism to a position that holds the covenant made by God with his people, Israel, is now viewed as valid and effective. He examines the tensions between this new teaching and the previous implicit teachings at the Council of Florence that view Jewish rituals negatively. He argues that these previous teachings assumed the free and knowing rejection of the truth of Christ by the Jewish people. Since this is no longer assumed, the new teachings can now draw on the significance of quasi-sacramentality attributed to Jewish religious practices. Second, he examines the land promise in the light of the creation of Israel in 1948. He argues for a tentative minimalist Catholic Zionism while upholding the rights of the Palestinian people and their claim to a nation and state. Finally, he argues that missionary work in Jewish communities is only viable if the Catholic Church allows for Hebrew Catholics to retain their Jewish religious culture while being Roman Catholics. He claims that in a post-supersessionist world view, any form of mission or witness that called into question Jewish religious legitimacy would be illegitimate.

D'Costa has followed up on this work by bringing together Faydra Shapiro, an Orthodox Jew, and an international collection of Roman Catholics to reflect on the people, land and state of Israel. The collection of essays, Contemporary Catholics Approaches to the People, Land and State of Israel (2022), reflects different Catholic positions, and presents a development of "minimal Catholic Zionism" for the first time.

D’Costa looks at the question of the relationship to non-Christian cultural artifacts in a wider sense in his Sexing the Trinity (2000). Here he engages with the thought of Luce Irigaray, a French feminist philosopher, to show how she both illuminates questions regarding the nature of the trinity while at the same time being called into question by Christian theology. D’Costa is critical of aspects of patriarchal theology and its social consequences, while also being critical of elements of feminist theology. He provides a close reading of Islam as presented through Salman Rushdie’s Satanic Verses and examines artistic representations of the trinity in Hindu and Christian culture.

== Criticisms ==
D’Costa has been criticized by pluralists, inclusivists and exclusivists. The strongest criticisms have come from pluralists. For example, John Hick has argued that D’Costa's claim that pluralism is just a disguised exclusivism is word play, and fails to deal with the substantial difference involved in the pluralist position. Hick has also claimed that D’Costa fails to recognize the hypothetical nature of the pluralist position and mistakes it for a religion. D'Costa's view of the descent into "hell" by Christ as a manner of resolving the necessity of explicitly knowing Christ as the condition for salvation also generated critical discussion. His study on Vatican II has had two journal issues devoted to the book. The criticisms vary regarding D'Costa's theological approach to the debate about continuity and discontinuity regarding Council teachings and specific claims made about the Council teachings regarding Jews and Muslims.

== Works ==
=== Books ===
- Theology and Religious Pluralism: the challenge of other religions. Oxford, OX & New York, NY: Wiley-Blackwell. 1986. ISBN 978-0-631-14518-9. OCLC 12807103.
- John Hick's Theology of Religions: a critical evaluation. Lanham, MD: University Press of America. 1987. ISBN 978-0-8191-6617-3. OCLC 16404874.
- Sexing the Trinity: Gender, Culture and the Divine. London: SCM Press. 2000. ISBN 978-0-334-02810-9. OCLC 45306597.
- The Meeting of Religions and the Trinity. Maryknoll, NY: Orbis Books. 2000. ISBN 978-1-5707-5303-9. OCLC 43615500.
- Theology in the Public Square: Church, Academy and Nation. Oxford: Blackwell. 2005. ISBN 978-1-4051-3509-2. OCLC 57893283.
- Christianity and the World Religions: Disputed Questions in the Theology of Religions. Oxford: Blackwell. 2009. ISBN 978-1-4051-7674-3. OCLC 276228967.
- Vatican II: Catholic Doctrines on Jews and Muslims. Oxford: Oxford University Press. 2014. ISBN 978-0-1996-5927-2.
- Catholic Doctrines on Jews after the Second Vatican Council. Oxford: Oxford University Press. 2019. ISBN 978-0-1988-3020-7.

=== As editor ===
- Christian Uniqueness Reconsidered: the Myth of a Pluralistic Theology of Religions. Faith Meets Faith. Maryknoll, NY: Orbis Books. 1990. ISBN 978-0-8834-4687-4. OCLC 21976208.
- Resurrection Reconsidered. Oxford, OX: Oneworld Books. 1990. ISBN 978-1-8516-8113-6. OCLC 35118246.
- D'Costa, Gavin; Gill, Sean; King, Ursula, eds. (1994). Religion in Europe: Contemporary Perspectives. Netherlands: Kok Pharos.
- The Catholic Church and the World Religions. A Theological and Phenomenological Account. London: T&T Clark. 2011. ISBN 978-0-5674-6697-6.
- D'Costa, Gavin; Crisp, Oliver; Davies, Mervyn; Hampson, Peter, eds. (2011). Theology and Philosophy: Faith and Reason. London: T&T Clark. ISBN 978-0-5674-1033-7.
- D'Costa, Gavin; Evans, Malcolm; Momood, Tariq; Rivers, Julian, eds. (2013). Religion in a Liberal State. Cambridge: Cambridge University Press. ISBN 978-1-1076-5007-7.
- D'Costa, Gavin; Harris, Emma Jane, eds. (2013). The Second Vatican Council: Celebrating its Achievements and the Future. London: T&T Clark. ISBN 978-0-5671-7911-1.
- D'Costa, Gavin; Nesbitt, Eleanor, eds. (2014). Making Nothing Happen: Five Poets Explore Faith and Spirituality. Routledge. ISBN 978-1-4094-5515-8.
- D'Costa, Gavin; Thompson, Ross, eds. (2015). Buddhist-Christian Dual Belonging: Affirmations, Objections, Explorations. Routledge. ISBN 978-1-4724-6091-2.

=== Articles and chapters ===
- D'Costa, Gavin (2010). "Pluralist Arguments: Prominent Tendencies and Methods". In Becker, Karl Josef; Morali, Ilaria (eds.). Catholic Engagement with World Religions. New York, NY: Orbis Books. pp. 329–344. ISBN 978-1-5707-5828-7.

=== Poetry ===
- Making Nothing Happen (2013)
