= Paterology =

Study of God the Father

Paterology, or patriology, in Christian theology, refers to the study of God the Father. Both terms are derived from two Greek words: πατήρ (patḗr, father) and λογος (logos, teaching). As a distinctive theological discipline, within Theology proper, Paterology is closely related to Christology (study of Christ as God the Son) and Pneumatology (study of the Holy Spirit as God the Spirit).

== Studies of God the Father ==
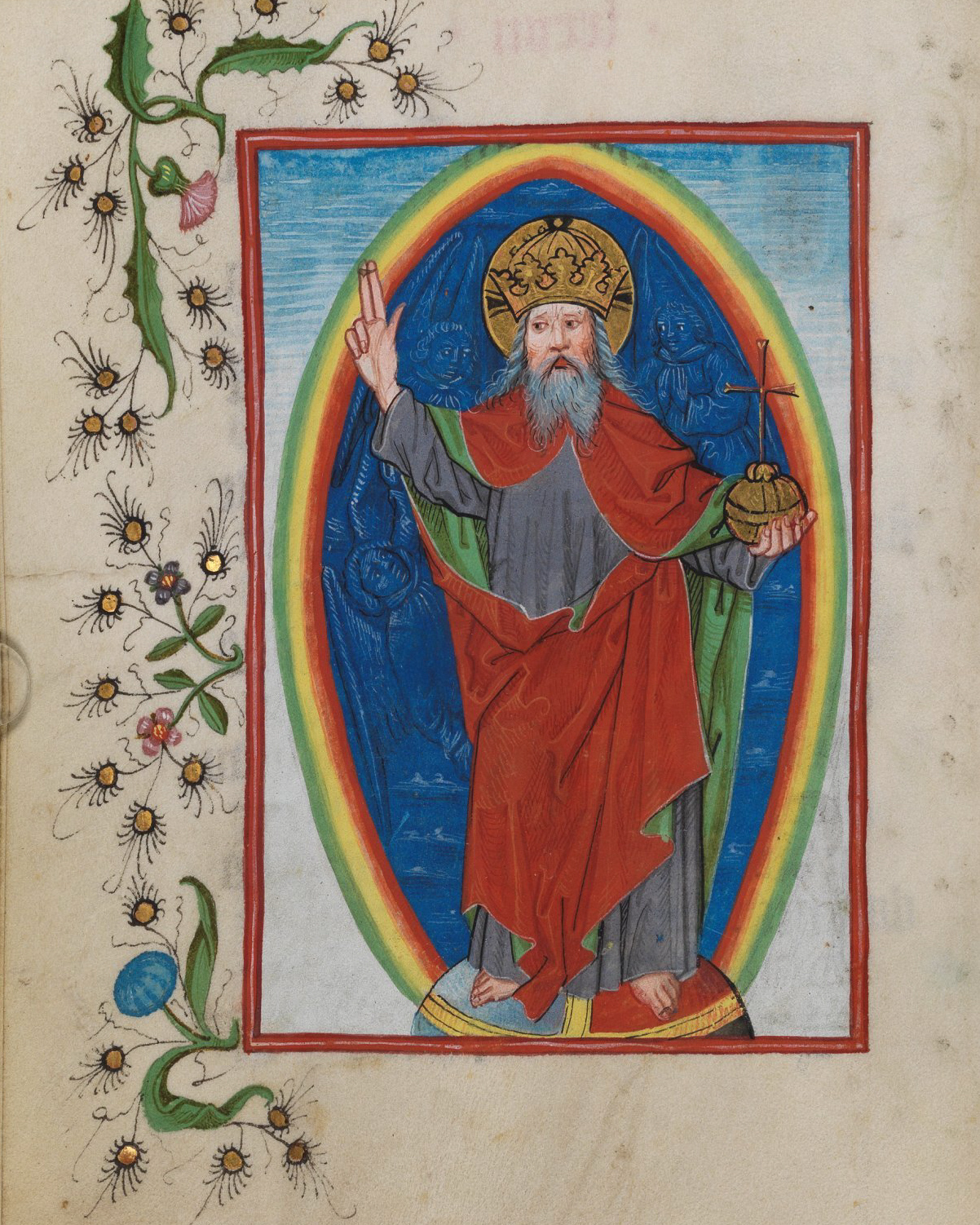
Representation of God the Father, in Medieval German prayer book (about 1486)

Christian Paterology is primarily based on the study and interpretation of Bible verses that refer to God as "Father". In the Old Testament, God is called by the title "Father". God is seen as "Father" to all men because he created the world (and in that sense "fathered" the world). In the Hebrew Scriptures, in Book of Isaiah 63:16 (JP) it reads: "For You are our father, for Abraham did not know us, neither did Israel recognize us; You, O Lord, are our father; our redeemer of old is your name." According to Judaism, God is attributed with fatherly role of protector. He is titled the Father of the poor, of the widows and orphans. He is also titled the Father of the king, as the teacher and helper over the judge of Israel.

There are three basic forms of the name of God the Father in the New Testament: Theos (θεός the Greek word for God), Kyrios (i.e. Lord in Greek) and Patḗr (Πατήρ i.e. Father in Greek). Also, the Aramaic word "Abba" (אבא; Father), is used in Mark 14:36 and in Romans 8:15 and Galatians 4:6. The word for Father was chosen to coin the name of the discipline because Paterology involves particular studies of the person of God the Father, and the works of the Father. In both the Old Testament and New Testament the term "Father" when used for God is a metaphor. It is not a proper name for God, but just one of many titles by which Jews and Christians speak of and to God.

In Christian theology, fatherhood of God is seen in a more substantive sense, centered around metaphysical rather than metaphorical interpretations of various questions about relations between the Father and the Son. Christian sense of participation in the eternal relationship of Father and Son, through Jesus Christ, is symbolically represented by the notion that Christians are adopted children of God:

But when the fullness of time had come, God sent forth his Son, born of woman, born under the law, to redeem those who were under the law, so that we might receive adoption as sons. And because you are sons, God has sent the Spirit of his Son into our hearts, crying, “Abba! Father!” So you are no longer a slave, but a son, and if a son, then an heir through God.

— Galatians 4:4–7

In Christianity, the concept of God as the Father of Jesus differs from the concept of God as the Creator and Father of all people.

At the end of the first century, Clement of Rome was referring to the Father regarding creation, 1 Clement 19.2 stating: "let us look steadfastly to the Father and Creator of the universe". Around AD 213 in Adversus Praxeas (chapter 3) Tertullian was developing a formal representation of the concept of the Trinity, meaning that God exists as one "substance" but three "Persons": The Father, the Son and the Holy Spirit, and with God the Father being the Head. This, however, is disputed by other scholars, according to whom Tertullian taught only the Father is truly God, as only he is eternal and not derived from any other substance, as the Son and Holy Spirit are. Tertullian was also discussing the relations of Holy Spirit to the Father and the Son. including the notion of procession "from the Father through the Son". (Note: Tertullian Adversus Praxeas 4 (ANF 3:599–600): "I believe the Spirit to proceed from no other source than from the Father through the Son") (Note: Tertullian Adversus Praxeas 5 (ANF 3:600–601).)

Different Christian denominations have different theological approaches to various paterological or patriological issues, concerning the person and works of God the Father.

Early creeds in the Western Church were affirming the belief in "God the Father (Almighty)", the primary reference being to "God in his capacity as Father and creator of the universe". This did not exclude the fact that "eternal father of the universe was also the Father of Jesus the Christ" nor that he had even "vouchsafed to adopt [the believer] as his son by grace".

Creeds in the Eastern Church began with an affirmation of faith in "one God" and usually expanded this by adding "the Father Almighty, Maker of all things visible and invisible" or similar words to that effect. The Nicene Creed, which dates to 325 and 381, states that the Son (Jesus Christ) is "eternally begotten of the Father", indicating that their divine Father-Son relationship is seen as not tied to an event within time or human history.

== See also ==
- God in Christianity
- Monarchianism
- Patripassianism
- Sabellianism
- Unitarianism

== Sources ==
- Barackman, Floyd H. (2001). Practical Christian Theology: Examining the Great Doctrines of the Faith (4th ed.). Grand Rapids, MI: Kregel Publications.
- Beeley, Christopher A. (2007). "Divine Causality and the Monarchy of God the Father in Gregory of Nazianzus". The Harvard Theological Review. 100 (2): 199–214.
- Kärkkäinen, Veli-Matti (2004). The Doctrine of God: A Global Introduction. Grand Rapids, MI: Baker Academic.
- Kelly, John N. D. (2006) [1972]. Early Christian Creeds (3rd ed.). London-New York: Continuum.
- Malina, Artur (2008). "Image of God the Father in the New Testament: Introductory Issues" (PDF). Śląskie Studia Historyczno-Teologiczne. 41 (2): 351–360.
- Mills, Watson E., ed. (1990). Mercer Dictionary of the Bible. Macon: Mercer University Press.
- O'Collins, Gerald; Farrugia, Mario (2015). Catholicism: The Story of Catholic Christianity (2nd ed.). Oxford: Oxford University Press.
- O'Grady, John F. (1992). Pillars of Paul's Gospel: Galatians and Romans. New York: Paulist Press.
- Olson, Roger E.; Hall, Christopher A. (2002). The Trinity. Grand Rapids, MI: William B. Eerdmans Publishing Company.
- Osborn, Eric F. (2003). Tertullian, First Theologian of the West. Cambridge, UK: Cambridge University Press.
- Rippee, Ryan L. (2018). That God May Be All in All: A Paterology Demonstrating That the Father Is the Initiator of All Divine Activity. Eugene, OR: Pickwick Publishers.
- Scott, Ian W. (2008). Paul's Way of Knowing: Story, Experience, and the Spirit. Grand Rapids, MI: Baker Academic.
- Thompson, Marianne M. (2000). The Promise of the Father: Jesus and God in the New Testament. Louisville: Westminster John Knox Press.
