= Theology proper =

Sub-discipline of systematic theology

Theology proper is the sub-discipline of systematic theology which deals specifically with the being, attributes and works of God. In Christian theology, and within the Trinitarian setting, this includes Paterology (the study of God the Father), Christology (the study of Jesus Christ) and Pneumatology (the study of the Holy Spirit).

== See also ==
- Apophatic theology
- Attributes of God
- Cataphatic theology
- Divine simplicity
- Divinization
- Eternality
- Godhead (Christianity)
- God the Father
- Immutability
- Impassibility
- Kenosis
- Monotheism
- Omnipotence
- Omnipresence
- Omniscience
- Ontology
- Prescience
- Transcendentals
- Trinity
- Theodicy
