= Transcendentals =

Truth, beauty, and goodness

In philosophy, the transcendentals (Latin: transcendentalia, from transcendere "to exceed") are the ultimate "properties of being" that exist beyond the material world, nowadays commonly considered to be truth, unity (oneness), beauty, and goodness. The formulation of the transcendentals as a set arose in medieval scholasticism, particularly with Aquinas, though the underlying ideas originated with Plato, Augustine, and Aristotle in the West.

From the time of Albertus Magnus in the High Middle Ages, the transcendentals have been the subject of metaphysics. Although there was disagreement about their number, there was consensus that, in addition to the basic concept of being itself (ens), unity (unum), truth (verum), and goodness (bonum) were part of the transcendental family. Since then, thing or reality (res), something (aliquid), and, more recently, beauty (pulchrum) have been added. Today, they are found in theology, particularly in Catholic thought, as unity, truth, goodness, and beauty.

== History ==
Parmenides was the first to inquire into the properties coextensive with being. Socrates, as presented by Plato, then followed (see Form of the Good).

Aristotle's substance theory (that being a substance belongs to being qua being) has been interpreted as a theory of the transcendentals. Aristotle discusses only unity ("One") explicitly because it is the only transcendental intrinsically related to being, whereas truth and goodness relate to rational creatures.

In the Middle Ages, Catholic philosophers elaborated the idea that there exist transcendentals (transcendentalia) and that they transcend each of the ten Aristotelian categories. Albert the Great formulated a doctrine of the transcendentality of the good. His pupil, Saint Thomas Aquinas, posited six transcendentals: ens, res, unum, aliquid, bonum, verum; that is, "being", "thing", "one", "something", "good", and "true". Saint Thomas derives the six explicitly as transcendentals, though in some cases he follows the typical list consisting of the One, the Good, and the True. The transcendentals are ontologically one and thus convertible: for example, where there is truth, there is also being and goodness.

In Christian theology, the transcendentals are treated in relation to theology proper, the doctrine of God. According to Christian doctrine, the transcendentals can be described as the ultimate desires of humanity. Humanity ultimately strives for perfection, which takes form through the desire for perfect attainment of the transcendentals. The Catholic Church teaches that God is Truth, Goodness, and Beauty, as indicated in the Catechism of the Catholic Church. Each transcends the limitations of place and time and is rooted in being. The transcendentals are not contingent upon cultural diversity, religious doctrine, or personal ideologies; they are the objective properties of all that exists.

Modern "integral" or holistic philosophy within the Wilberian lineage, as well as Steve McIntosh, author of Evolution's Purpose, seeks to integrate Beauty, Truth, and Goodness as necessary requisites of all evolution in the Kosmos (body, mind, soul, spirit) at both the microcosmic developmental level and the sociological level.

== Beauty, Goodness and Truth ==
The three terms Beauty, Goodness, and Truth form a subgroup within the family of transcendentals, and their development can be considered separately. In Plato's dialogues, the individual concepts are mentioned frequently, but nowhere in his works are beauty, goodness, and truth put forward as a specific group. The more common formulations in the dialogues are justice, goodness, and beauty, and justice, goodness, and wisdom. Aristotle similarly does not refer to the three concepts as a group, but in the Metaphysics he states that "each thing relates to being and truth in the same way," and in the Ethics that "good is said in as many ways as being."

In the second century CE, there was in Alexandria a group of early Christian Neoplatonists who were beginning to link the ideas of Plotinus, in particular the ideas of the One, the Soul, and the Intellect, to "the three persons of the Trinity" (Lilla 1997). St. Augustine, a little later, developed an early notion of the transcendentals, namely Being, Goodness, and Truth, and a connection began to be made between these and the three human faculties of being, willing, and knowing. In the sixth century, Pseudo-Dionysius compiled a list of divine names that attributed to God the concepts of the One, the Good, Light, Love, Beauty, Truth, and many other terms.

These notions were carried forward into the medieval period, where Thomas Aquinas took from his mentor Albert the Great the idea that the transcendentals were a set of three, namely Unum, Bonum, Verum (the One, the Good, and the True), referring to them as the Ens Realissimum, or the most real Being. It has been suggested that Bonaventure, while agreeing that the One, the Good, and the True could be seen as three aspects of Being, proposed adding a fifth concept to the list of transcendentals, that of Pulchrum or Beauty, but this has been disputed.

In the fifteenth century in Florence, the philosopher Marsilio Ficino was instrumental in reviving interest in Plato, and the first definitive formulation of Beauty, Goodness, and Truth has been attributed to him. The specific passage is found in the Commentaries (1496):

"So the action of the intelligence is directed to some end. For in so far as it understands, its end is the truth; in so far as it wills, its end is the good; in so far as it acts its end is the beautiful"

The idea seems to have been taken up by the Humanist writers who followed Ficino, for example Baldassare Castiglione, and it may be assumed that one of these, perhaps Gian Giorgio Trissino, the patron of the architect Palladio, influenced the latter's reference in his book I Quattro Libri (1570) to the "true, good and beautiful method of building," the first known use of the terms consecutively.

Although there are references to the threefold group in Italian thought (e.g., Muratori 1706) and German thought (König 1727), it was in France (Diderot from 1747 onward) that the triad began to appear with any great significance. In 1762, in a letter to Voltaire, Diderot referred to "the true, the good and the beautiful [as] a kind of trinity," and Victor Cousin's book Du vrai, du beau et du bien (Of the True, the Beautiful and the Good) appeared in its final form in 1853.

Towards the end of the eighteenth century, Immanuel Kant put the concepts to use in his three great works, Critique of Pure Reason (1781), Critique of Practical Reason (1788), and Critique of Judgment (1790), in which the subjects of truth, goodness, and beauty were dealt with in turn. Nowhere did he refer specifically to the set of three, but he did say of another set taken from medieval logic, namely "the One, the Good, and the True," that although seemingly empty, it may have had "some rules of understanding... wrongly interpreted."

Seventy years later, Charles Sanders Peirce, influenced by Kant, began to develop an idea of three larger categories under which the three concepts might fall. To these categories he gave the names Firstness, Secondness, and Thirdness, and used them to give an order to, among other things, "the three normative sciences: aesthetics, ethics and logic," terms which may be compared with Beauty, Goodness, and Truth. Although the order in which the terms appear has varied throughout history, Peirce's own conclusion was that "Logic follows Ethics and both follow Aesthetics."

The specific grouping together of Beauty, Goodness, and Truth was not, it seems, of particular importance to Kant or Peirce and was not mentioned by them. Nietzsche, too, rejected consideration of the group, saying that it was "unworthy of a philosopher." There was a shift, however, among philosophers around this time from seeing the group not in terms of metaphysical concepts but as three important human values. Franz Brentano was one of the first proponents of this way of thinking, and his list of values (1889) included, among others, Beauty, Virtue, and Knowledge; G. E. Moore included similar values in his Principia Ethica of 1903; and A. N. Whitehead, another philosopher of the early twentieth century, referred in his book Process and Reality (1929) to the "vision of truth, beauty and goodness" which continues to lead us on.

== See also ==
- Transcendence (philosophy)

== Bibliography ==
- Jan A. Aertsen, Medieval Philosophy and the Transcendentals: the Case of Thomas Aquinas, Leiden: Brill, 1996.
- Jan A. Aertsen, Medieval Philosophy as Transcendental Thought. From Philip the Chancellor (ca. 1225) to Francisco Suárez, Leiden: Brill, 2012.
- John P. Doyle, On the Borders of Being and Knowing. Late Scholastic Theory of Supertranscendental Being, Leuven: Leuven University Press, 2012.
- Graziella Federici Vescovini (éd.), Le problème des Transcendantaux du XIVe au XVIIe siècle, Paris: Vrin, « Bibliothèque d’Histoire de la Philosophie », 2001.
- Bruno Pinchard (éd.), Fine folie ou la catastrophe humaniste, études sur les transcendentaux à la Renaissance, Paris, Champion, 1995.
- Piero di Vona, Spinoza e i trascendentali, Napoli: Morano, 1977.
