= Comparative theology =

Discipline within theology

Comparative theology is a discipline within theology which holds together "comparative" and "theology" in creative tension. It represents a particular type of theological practice committed to deep interreligious learning ("comparative") while staying rooted in a particular religious tradition ("theology"). Moreover, while many of its proponents come from the Christian religious tradition, it can have as a starting point the theology of any religious tradition.

== Relations to other disciplines ==
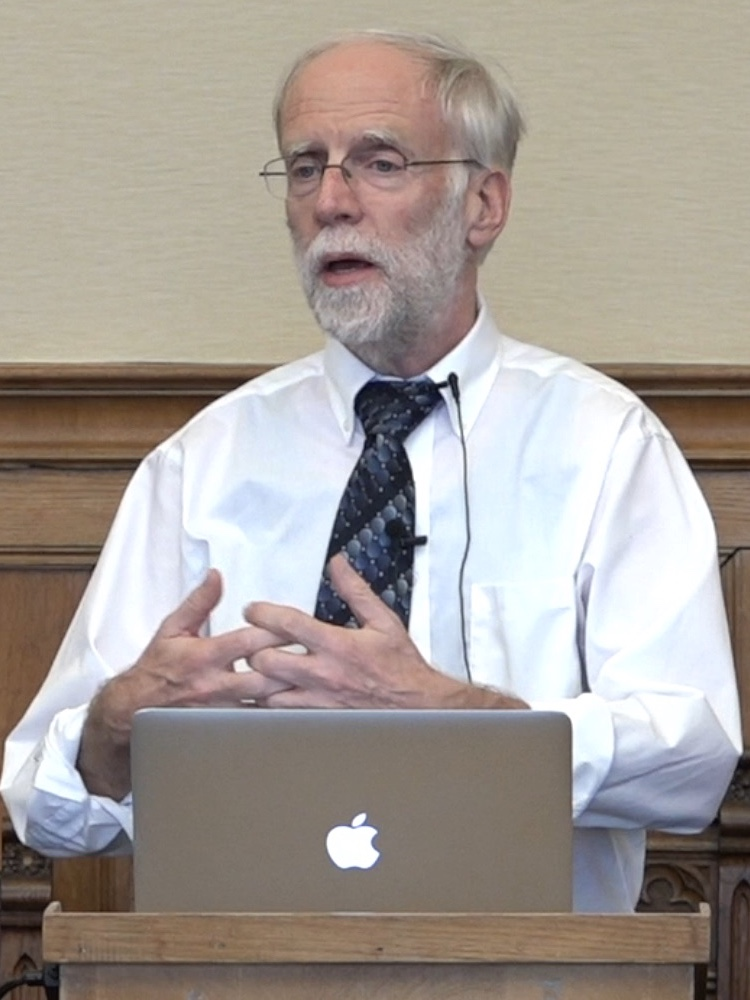
Francis X. Clooney, a leading exponent of comparative theology

Francis Xavier Clooney, a leading figure within comparative theology, sees comparative theology essentially as "faith seeking understanding". He explains the distinctiveness of comparative theology by clarifying the relationship between comparative theology and the related disciplines of comparative religion, theology of religions, and interfaith dialogue.

=== Comparative theology vs. comparative religion ===
Comparative theology shares with comparative religion an interest in the comparative study of religion. However, in contrast to comparative religion, which seeks to examine the similarities and differences between a variety of religious traditions from a neutral point of view, comparative theology focuses on the theological reflection of one's own religion in light of the insights from another religious tradition. Rather than emphasizing a religiously-detached position, comparative theology is deeply rooted in a particular religious tradition. Clooney explains:

Comparative theology – comparative and theological beginning to end – marks acts of faith seeking understanding which are rooted in a particular faith tradition but which, from that foundation, venture into learning from one or more other faith traditions. This learning is sought for the sake of fresh theological insights that are indebted to the newly encountered tradition/s as well as the home tradition.

=== Comparative theology vs. theology of religion ===
Comparative theology shares with theology of religions a theological interest in the encounter between Christian faith and other religions; but from a different angle, and with a different emphasis and aim. Theology of religion attempts to clarify the relationship between Christian faith and other religious traditions with regard to how other religions can be understood in light of normative claims of Christian faith, in particular, related to salvation and Jesus. Theology of religion thus reflects on Christian theological claims, based on general descriptions of other religious traditions. In contrast to this, comparative theology is a theology of religious learning. It emphasizes an in-depth study of the particularities of other religious traditions instead of basing itself on general descriptions. "Comparative theology is not primarily about which religion is the true one, but about learning across religious borders in a way that discloses the truth of my faith, in the light of their faith."

=== Comparative theology vs. interreligious dialogue ===
Comparative theology shares with interreligious dialogue a commitment to engage in dialogue and listen carefully to the religious other. It must, however, go further than just listening: "The comparative theologian must do more than listen to others explain their faith; she must be willing to study their traditions deeply alongside her own, taking both to heart."

== Sources and methodology ==
The unique character of comparative theology derives from its sources and methodology.

Comparative theology works with two types of religious sources. While rooted in one tradition, comparative theology has its foundation also in at least one additional religious tradition. Clooney describes comparative theology

. . . as truly constructive theology, distinguished by its sources and ways of proceeding, by its foundation in more than one tradition (although the comparativist always remains rooted in one tradition), and by reflection which builds on that foundation, rather than simply on themes or by methods already articulated prior to comparative practice.

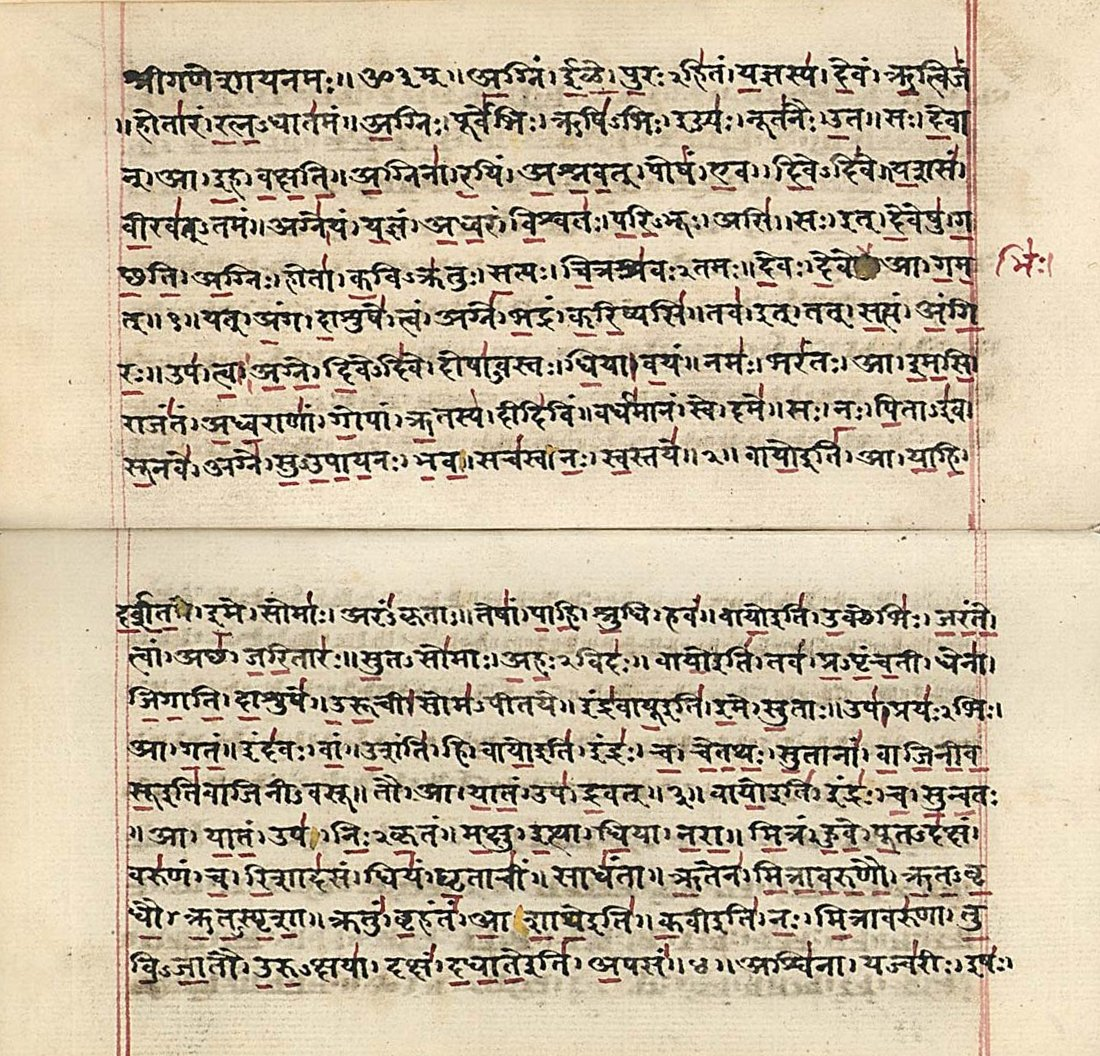
Rigveda manuscript in Devanagari

Comparative theology is dialectical practice. The comparison starts with a critical study of the other religion. This first step involves a persistent and disciplined in-depth study of the other religious tradition where the theologian exposes herself to the sacred texts of the other tradition. The comparative theologian practices "hermeneutical openness" in a manner where comprehension should precede judgment. This implies a "bracketing" of subjective commitments / theological judgments, allowing the other religious tradition to speak as much as possible on its own terms. It is a practice of making oneself "vulnerable to intellectual, imaginative, affective transformation."

The comparison, in turn, becomes a conversation with your own tradition. The insights emerging from the encounter with the other religious tradition might influence the conceptual framework for interpreting your own tradition, causing a reconsideration of your Christian identity. Correlations are made between the two traditions, which might imply recognition of similarities or recognition of differences. At this point "the 'normative theological judgments' that were temporarily suspended are brought back into the hermeneutical circle." Grounds are provided for raising more profound theological questions, conversation with other theologians, and potentially leading to new theological construction. This theological procedure resonates with Clooney's claim that

Comparative theology is a theology deeply changed by its attention to the details of multiple religious and theological traditions, a theology that occurs only after comparison.

Contemporary theology has, so far, been mainly a text-based discipline, and comparative theologians engage primarily with texts from one religious tradition outside their own, due to the in-depth study that is required. Although associated with Christian theology, the approach applied in comparative theology is not particularly Christian and can be a practiced grounded in other religious traditions as well.

== History and key figures ==
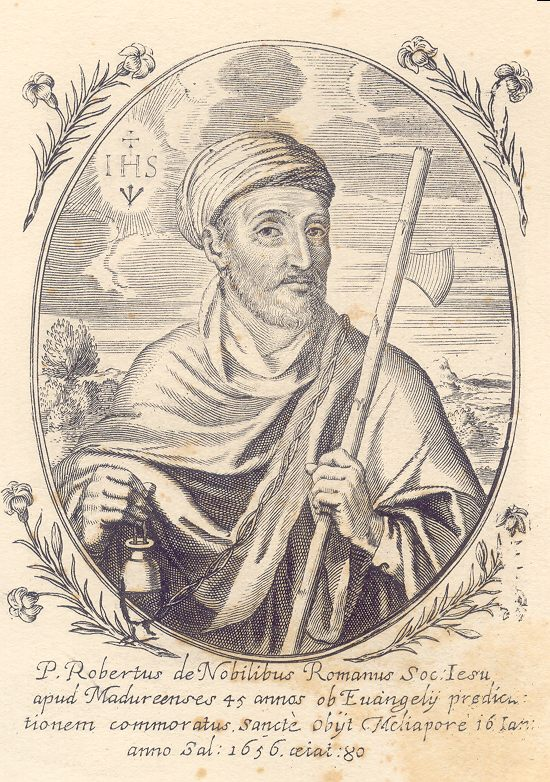
Roberto de Nobili (1577–1656), Jesuit missionary to India

Comparative theology has historical forerunners in figures such as the Jesuit missionaries Francis Xavier and Roberto de Nobili.

Since the 1980s, comparative theology has developed as a particular theological response to the growing religious diversity in the contemporary world. It has been introduced by Francis X. Clooney and James L. Fredericks, and is a methodology used by individuals such as David Tracy, Keith Ward, and Robert C. Neville. The discipline arose through the growing impact of Alan Race's three-fold understanding of theology of religions, that resulted in various arguments about the benefits of the models of theology of religions.

A new generation of comparative theologians is today expanding the discourse, drawing it in new directions.

== See also ==
- Multiple religious belonging
