= Paul F. Knitter =

American theologian (born 1939)

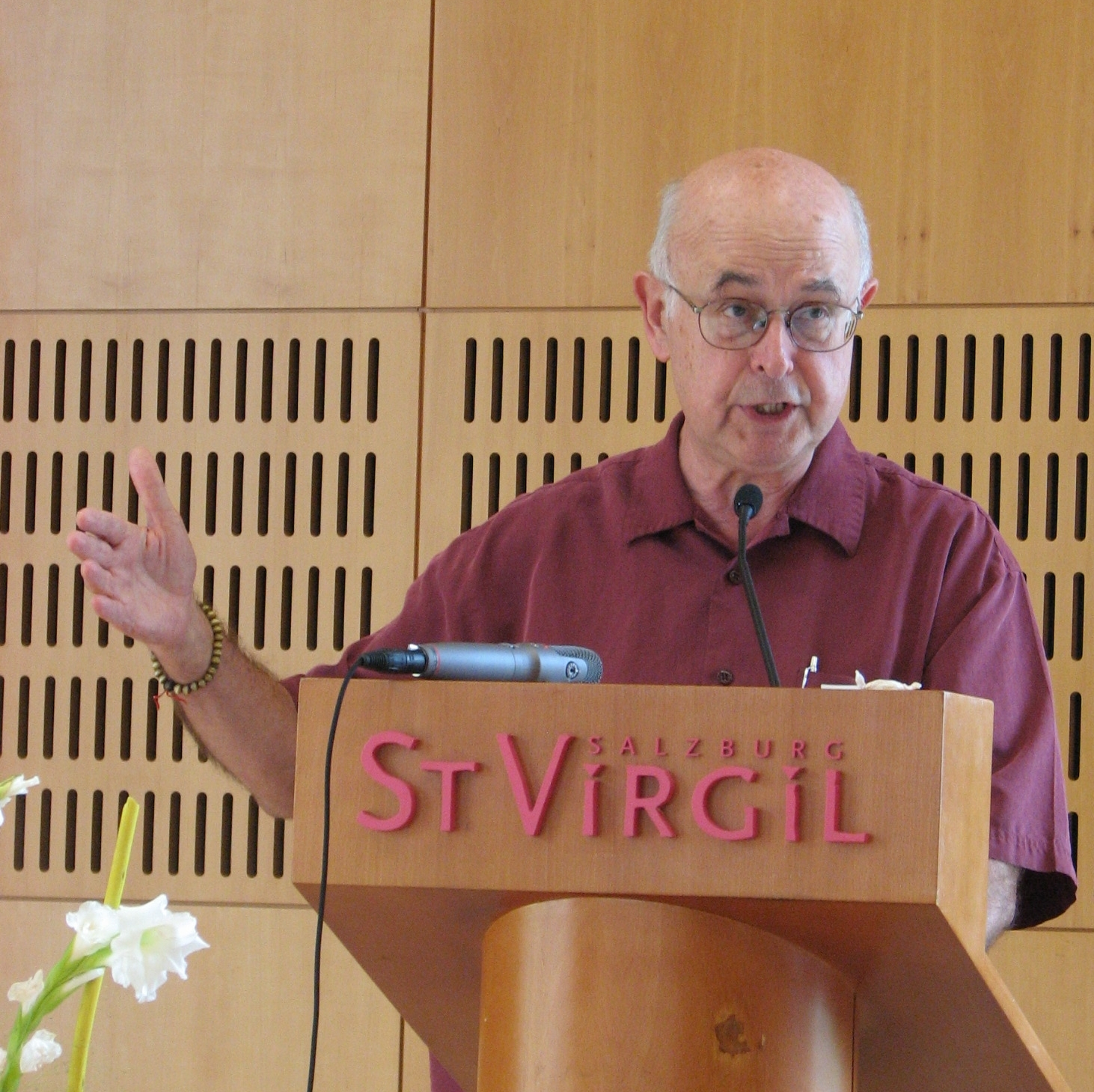
- Born: Paul Francis Knitter; February 25, 1939 (age 87); Chicago, Illinois, US
- Spouse: Cathy Cornell (m. c. 1984)

Academic background
- Education: Pontifical Gregorian University; University of Marburg

Academic work
- Discipline: Theology
- Institutions: Xavier University; Union Theological Seminary
- Main interests: Religious pluralism

Paul Francis Knitter (born February 25, 1939) is an American theologian. He is currently an emeritus professor at Union Theological Seminary, where he has served as the Paul Tillich Professor of Theology, World Religions and Culture since 2007. He is also Emeritus Professor of Theology at Xavier University in Cincinnati, where he taught for 28 years before moving to Union. Knitter is known for his work on religious pluralism and multiple religious belonging, particularly regarding Buddhism and Christianity.

== Life and career ==
Knitter was born in Chicago, Illinois. Ordained as a priest in the Roman Catholic Church shortly after the Second Vatican Council, he holds a licentiate from the Pontifical Gregorian University in Rome (1966), as well as a doctorate from the University of Marburg, Germany (1972). Knitter received permission to leave the priesthood in 1975, becoming a professor of theology at Xavier. He married Cathy Cornell, a Buddhist meditation teacher, in 1984.

Since publishing his book, No Other Name? (1985), Knitter has been widely known for his religious pluralism. Knitter, who identifies as a "Buddhist Christian," explores the phenomenon of multiple religious belonging in Buddhism and Christianity in Without Buddha, I Could Not Be a Christian (2009).

In 1984, Knitter was one of 97 theologians and religious persons who signed A Catholic Statement on Pluralism and Abortion, calling for pluralism and discussion within the Catholic Church regarding the church's position on abortion.

Knitter is a board member of CRISPAZ (Christians for Peace in El Salvador).

=== Criticism ===
Along with his friend and colleague, the Protestant philosopher of religion John Hick, Knitter came under criticism of Cardinal Joseph Ratzinger, then-prefect of Congregation of the Doctrine of the Faith and later Pope Benedict XVI, for "relativism." Similar concerns have been raised by other theologians. Catherine Cornille, addressing Knitter's claim that Jesus is not the "only" savior in Jesus and the Other Names, comments: "Not only are the religious views of different traditions at times directly opposed or mutually exclusive, but the very claim of ultimacy of one religion necessarily precludes the truth of the claims of others." Robert Magliola criticizes Knitter's proposed "one universal Spirit" concept, asserting that it perpetuates the modernist idea of "equable holism" or "openness" (the "modern idol") rather than the "jagged, asymmetrical" nature of reality. Critiquing Knitter's views on religious double belonging, Joseph A. Bracken argues that "in ethical reflection one should begin with the recognition of the Otherness of the Other" rather than with "the sustained meditation by the self on one's moral responsibility for others":

In a review of Jesus and Buddha: Friends in Conversation, Magliola critiqued Knitter and Roger Haight's discussion of the possibility of double belonging in Catholicism and Mahayana Buddhism:

Mahayana Buddhism affirms the Two truths doctrine, mundane truth and Ultimate truth, are mystically identical, i.e., "form is emptiness and emptiness is form." Catholic Christianity, for its part has teachings such as . . . the presence of God in all things via "essence, presence, and power," but matter and form are never regarded as absolutely identical. Thus, in regard to the Ultimate, Mahayanist affirmation of the absolute identity (via the Dharmakāya) and Catholic rejection of the absolute identity (at any level or degree) are two tenets that irreducibly contradict each other.

== Works ==
=== Thesis ===
- Knitter, Paul F. (1974). Towards a Protestant Theology of Religions (PhD). Marburger Theologische Studien. Vol. 11. Marburg: N.G. Elwert. ISBN 9783770804856. OCLC 611481104.

=== Books ===
- ——— (1985). No Other Name? A Critical Survey of Christian Attitudes toward World Religions. American Society of Missiology series. Vol. 7. Maryknoll, NY: Orbis Books. ISBN 9780883443477.
- ———; Hick, John, eds. (1987). The Myth of Christian Uniqueness: Toward a Pluralistic Theology of Religions. Maryknoll, NY: Orbis Books.
- ———; Hill, Brennan; Madges, William (1989). Faith, Religion, and Theology: A Contemporary Introduction. Twenty-Third Publications. ISBN 9780896224155.
- ———; Corless, Roger, eds. (1990). Buddhist Emptiness and Christian Trinity Essays and Explorations. Mahwah, NJ: Paulist Press. ISBN 9780809131310.
- ———; Cobb, Jr., John B.; Hellwig, Monika; Swidler, Leonard (1990). Death or Dialogue: From the Age of Monologue to the Age of Dialogue. London: SCM Press. ISBN 9780334024453.
- ———, ed. (1990). Pluralism and Oppression: Theology in World Perspective. Annual publication of the College Theology Society. Vol. 34. Lanham: University Press of America. ISBN 9780819179043.
- ——— (1995). One Earth Many Religions: Multifaith Dialogue and Global Responsibility. Maryknoll, NY: Orbis Books. ISBN 9781570750373.
- ——— (1996). Jesus and the Other Names: Christian Mission and Global Responsibility. Maryknoll, NY: Orbis Books. ISBN 9781570750533.
- ——— (1997). Swidler, Leonard; Mojzes, Paul (eds.). The Uniqueness of Jesus: A Dialogue with Paul Knitter. Maryknoll, NY: Orbis Books. ISBN 9781570751233.
- ——— (2002). Introducing Theologies of Religions. Maryknoll, NY: Orbis Books. ISBN 9781570754197.
- ———; Muzaffar, Chandra, eds. (2002). Subverting Greed: Religious Perspectives on the Global Economy. Maryknoll, NY: Orbis Books. ISBN 9781570754463.
- ——— (2005). The Myth of Religious Superiority: multifaith explorations of religious pluralism. Maryknoll, NY: Orbis Books. ISBN 9781570756276.
- ——— (2009). Without Buddha I Could Not Be a Christian. Oxford: Oneworld. ISBN 9781851686735.
- ——— (2015). Jesus and Buddha: Friends in Conversation. Maryknoll, NY: Orbis Books.

== See also ==
- Wilfred Cantwell Smith
