= Veli-Matti Kärkkäinen =

Finnish theologian (born 1958)

- Born: 1958 (age 67–68); Finland
- Occupation: Professor

Academic background
- Education: University of Helsinki, Fuller Theological Seminary, University of Jyväskylä

Academic work
- Discipline: Systematic Theology
- Institutions: Fuller Theological Seminary

Veli-Matti Kärkkäinen (born 1958) is a Finnish theologian. He is Professor of Systematic Theology at Fuller Theological Seminary. He is an ordained Lutheran minister (ELCA - Evangelical Lutheran Church in America) and an expert on Pentecostal-Charismatic theologies.

== Biography ==
Veli-Matti Kärkkäinen was born into a Finnish Lutheran family. As a teenager, he would eventually become affiliated to a local Pentecostal church in his homeland. Later in life, he has been ordained as minister of ELCA and serves as part-time associate pastor for Finnish Lutheran Church in California and Texas (under Southwest California ELCA synod).

After receiving a M.Ed. from the University of Jyväskylä, Kärkkäinen pursued a M.A. in theology from Fuller Theological Seminary. He returned to Finland and was ordained as a minister of the Full Gospel Church of Finland, pastoring a local congregation from 1989 to 1991. In 1991, he moved his family to Thailand and taught at the Full Gospel Bible College in Bangkok. Three years later he returned to Finland, becoming president of the Iso Kirja Bible College in Keuruu in 1994. He completed his doctorate at the University of Helsinki in 1998.

Kärkkäinen joined the faculty of Fuller in 2000 as associate professor of systematic theology and became full professor in 2003. Kärkkäinen also serves as Docent of Ecumenics at the University of Helsinki.

== Theology ==
Kärkkäinen has written textbooks offering "global introductions" to pneumatology, ecclesiology, and christology.

In 2017 he completed the fifth of his projected five-volume systematic theology series called Constructive Christian Theology for the Church in the Pluralistic World, which engages questions of science and religion, global theology, and dialogue with other religions through comparative theology.

According to Amos Yong, he is "fast becoming one of the more important theologians to be reckoned with in our time."

== Writings ==
Main works:

- Kärkkäinen, Veli-Matti (2002). Pneumatology: The Holy Spirit in Ecumenical, International, and Contextual Perspective. Grand Rapids, MI: Baker Academic. ISBN 9780801024481.
- Kärkkäinen, Veli-Matti (2004). The Doctrine of God: A Global Introduction. Grand Rapids, MI: Baker Academic. ISBN 9780801027529.
- Kärkkäinen, Veli-Matti, ed. (2010). Holy Spirit and Salvation: The Sources of Christian Theology. Louisville, KY: Westminster John Knox Press. ISBN 9780664231361.
- A Constructive Christian Theology for the Pluralistic World (Eerdmans; 5 Volumes):
1. Christ and Reconciliation (2013) ISBN 978-0-8028-6853-4
2. Trinity and Revelation (2014) ISBN 978-0-8028-6854-1
3. Creation and Humanity (2015) ISBN 978-0-8028-6855-8
4. Spirit and Salvation (2016) ISBN 978-0-8028-6856-5
5. Hope and Community (2017) ISBN 978-0-8028-6857-2
- Kärkkäinen, Veli-Matti (2019). Christian Theology in the Pluralistic World: A Global Introduction. Grand Rapids, MI: Eerdmans. ISBN 9780802874658.
