= Christianity and other religions =

This article documents the various relationships which exist between branches of Christianity and other (i.e. non-Christian) world religions.

== Christian views on religious pluralism ==
=== Western Christian views ===
Some Christians have argued that religious pluralism is an invalid or a self-contradictory concept. Maximal forms of religious pluralism claim that all religions are equally true, or they claim that one religion can be true for some people and another religion can be true for others. Some Christians hold the view that such pluralism is logically impossible. The Catholic Church teaches that while it is the fullest and most complete revelation of God to man, other Christian denominations have also received genuine revelation from God.

Although Calvinists believe that God and the truth of God cannot be plural, they also believe that those civil ordinances of man which restrain man from doing evil and encourage man to do good, are ordinances of God (regardless of the religion, or the lack of it, of those who wield that power). Christians are obligated to be at peace with all men, as far as it is up to them, and they are also obligated to submit to governments for the Lord's sake, and pray for their enemies. Calvinism is not pacifistic, and as a result, Calvinists have been involved in religious wars, most notably, they were involved in the French Wars of Religion and the English Civil War. Some of the first parts of modern Europe where religious tolerance was practiced had Calvinistic populations, most notably the Netherlands.

Evangelical Christians believe that religious pluralism is heresy and contradicts the Bible.

=== Modern (post-Enlightenment) Christian views ===
In recent years, some Christian groups have become more open to religious pluralism; this has led to many cases of reconciliation between Christians and people of other faiths. The liberalization of many seminaries and theological institutions, particularly in regards to the rejection of the notion that the Bible is an infallible document, has led to a much more human-centered and secular movement within Mainline Christian denominations, particularly in the United States. Some Mainline churches no longer hold to exclusivist views on salvation.

In recent years there has been much to note in the way of reconciliation between some Christian groups and the Jewish people. Many modern day Christians, including many Catholics and some liberal Protestants, have developed a view of the New Testament as an extended covenant; they believe that Jews are still in a valid relationship with God, and that Jews – qua Jews – can avoid damnation and earn a heavenly reward. For these Christians, the New Testament extended God's original covenant to cover non-Jews. The article Christian–Jewish reconciliation deals with this issue in detail.

Multiple smaller Christian groups in the US and Canada have come into being over the last 40 years, such as "Christians for Israel". Their website says that they exist in order to "expand Christian-Jewish dialogue in the broadest sense in order to improve the relationship between Christians and Jews, but also between Church and Synagogue, emphasizing Christian repentance, the purging of anti-Jewish preliminary attitudes and the false 'Replacement' theology rampant throughout Christian teachings."

A number of large Christian groups, including the Catholic Church and several large Protestant churches, have publicly declared that they will no longer proselytize Jews.

Other Modern Christian views, including some conservative Protestants, reject the idea of the New Testament as an extended covenant, and retain the classical Christian view as described above.

=== Modern views specific to Catholicism ===
For the Catholic Church, there has been a move at reconciliation not only with Judaism, but also with Islam and other faiths.

The Second Vatican Council states that salvation includes others who acknowledge the same creator, and explicitly lists Muslims among those (using the term Mohammedans, which was the word commonly used among non-Muslims at the time). The official Catholic position is therefore that Jews, Muslims and Christians (including churches outside of Rome's authority) all acknowledge the same God, though Jews and Muslims have not yet received the gospel while other churches are generally considered deviant to a greater or lesser degree.

The Council directed that clerical training should provide an introduction to "[the] other religions which are more widespread in individual regions", so that future clergy would be able to "acknowledge more correctly what truth and goodness these religions, in God's providence, possess, and so that they may learn to refute their errors and be able to communicate the full light of truth to those who do not have it".

The most prominent event in the way of dialogue between religions has arguably been the 1986 Peace Prayer in Assisi, to which Pope John Paul II, against considerable resistance also from within the Roman Catholic church, invited representatives of all world religions. John Paul II's remarks regarding Christian denominations were found in his Ut unum sint address. This initiative was taken up by the Community of Sant'Egidio, who, with the support of John Paul II, organized yearly peace meetings of religious representatives. These meetings, consisting of round tables on different issues and of a common time of prayer, have done much to further understanding and friendship between religious leaders and to further concrete peace initiatives. In order to avoid the reproaches of syncretism that were leveled at the 1986 Assisi meeting where the representatives of all religions held one common prayer, the follow-up meetings saw the representatives of the different religions pray in different places according to their respective traditions.

The question of whether traditional Chinese ancestor veneration, consists of worshipping a God or veneration of a saint was important to the Roman Catholic church during the Chinese Rites controversy of the early 18th century. This dispute was between the Dominicans who argued that Confucianism and Chinese folk religion was worship, and therefore incompatible with Catholicism, and the Jesuits, who argued the reverse. The pope ultimately ruled in favor of the Dominicans, a decision which greatly reduced the role of Catholic missionaries in China. However, this decision was partially reversed by Pope Pius XII in 1939; after this, Chinese customs were no longer considered superstition or idolatry, but a way of honoring esteemed relatives (not entirely dissimilar to the Catholic practice of praying for the dead).

== Relationship with the Baháʼí Faith ==
The Baháʼí Faith believes that there is one God who sends divine messengers to guide humanity throughout time, which is called progressive revelation (Baháʼí)—and is different from the Christian belief of progressive revelation (Christian). They believe in the divine knowledge and essence of Jesus, among other messengers such as Muhammad, Zoroaster, Moses, Buddha, Krishna, and others. Interpretations vary, but the Baháʼí Faith is sometimes considered an Abrahamic faith. The followers of the Baháʼí Faith believe in God, as do Christians, and recognize Jesus' teachings, but they have different views of the Trinity and divinity of Jesus. The Baháʼí view of prophets is that although they have both human and divine characteristics, they are not themselves God, but rather "divine manifestations". They also see the Trinity as symbolic where Jesus and the Holy Spirit are polished mirrors that reflect the pure light from God. Although Baháʼís affirm the Bible as sacred scripture, they do not consider the Bible to be wholly authentic as Shoghi Effendi, the Guardian of the Baháʼí Faith, affirmed that "The Bible is not wholly authentic, and in this respect not to be compared with the Qur’án, and should be wholly subordinated to the authentic Sayings of Bahá’u’lláh."

Baháʼís share some views with Christianity regarding moral and immoral behavior. Baháʼís condemn polygamy, premarital sex, and homosexual acts while treating everyone, including homosexuals, with love, respect, and dignity.

== Relationship with Buddhism ==
In the 19th century, some scholars began to perceive similarities between Buddhist and Christian practices. For example, in 1878, T.W. Rhys Davids wrote that the earliest missionaries to Tibet observed that similarities have been seen in Christianity and Buddhism since the first known contact was made between adherents of the two religions. In 1880 Ernest De Bunsen made similar observations and noted that except for the death of Jesus on the cross, and the Christian doctrine of atonement, the most ancient Buddhist records noted that similarities existed between Buddhist and Christian traditions.

Buddhism and Protestantism came into political conflict in 19th century Sri Lanka and Tibet c. 1904 (the Francis Younghusband Expedition). Various individuals and organizations have helped introduce various strains of Buddhist theology and meditation to several generations of Western spiritual seekers (including some Catholic religious). Relations between both religions are generally good, except in South Korea where Christians have damaged Buddhist temples and engaged in other forms of Christian extremism. The Russian republic of Kalmykia recognizes Tibetan/Lamaist Buddhism and Russian Orthodoxy as its official religions.

== Relationship with Druze ==
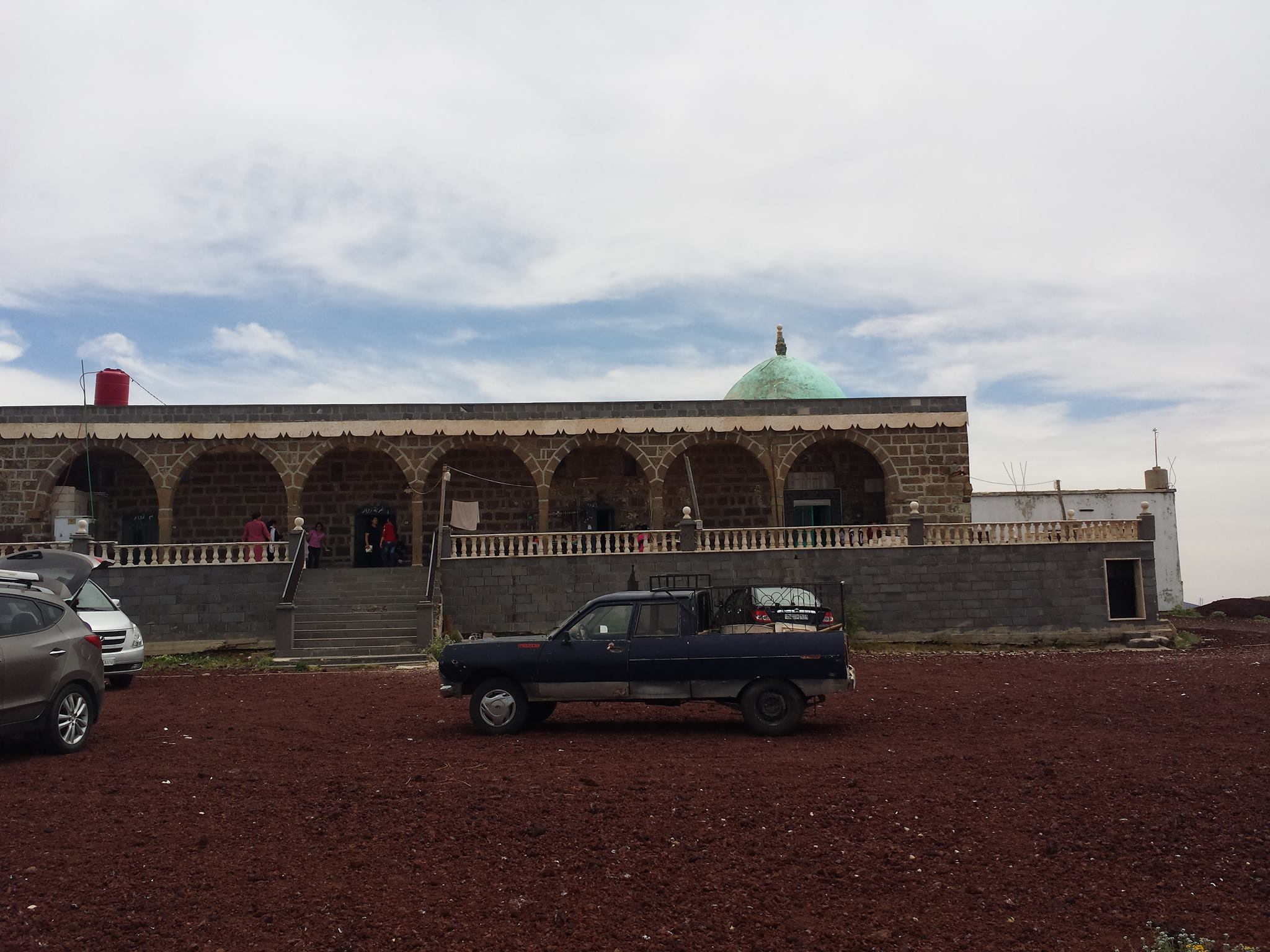
The Druze Maqam al-Masih (Jesus) in As-Suwayda Governorate: Both religions revere Jesus.

Christianity and Druze are Abrahamic religions that share a historical traditional connection with some major theological differences. The two faiths share a common place of origin in the Middle East, and consider themselves to be monotheistic. The relationship between the Druze and Christians has been characterized by harmony and peaceful coexistence, with amicable relations between the two groups prevailing throughout history, with the exception of some periods, including 1860 Mount Lebanon civil war. Conversion of Druze to Christianity used to be common practice in the Levant region. Over the centuries, several prominent members of the Druze community have embraced Christianity, including some of Shihab dynasty members, as well as the Abi-Lamma clan.

Christian and Druze communities share a long history of interaction dating back roughly a millennium, particularly in Mount Lebanon. Interaction between Christian communities (Maronites, Eastern Orthodox, Melkite Catholic, and others) and the Unitarian Druze, led to the presence of mixed villages and towns in Mount Lebanon, Chouf, Wadi al-Taym, Jabal al-Druze, the Galilee region, Mount Carmel, and Golan Heights. The Maronite Catholics and the Druze founded modern Lebanon in the early eighteenth century, through a governing and social system known as the "Maronite-Druze dualism" in the Mount Lebanon Mutasarrifate.

Druze doctrine teaches that Christianity is to be "esteemed and praised" as the Gospel writers are regarded as "carriers of wisdom". The Druze faith incorporates some elements of Christianity, and other religious beliefs. The full Druze canon or Druze scripture (Epistles of Wisdom) includes the Old Testament, the New Testament, the Quran and philosophical works by Plato and those influenced by Socrates among works from other religions and philosophers, and adopted some Christian elements. The Druze faith shows influence of Christian monasticism, among other religious practices. Some scholars suggest that early Christian Gnostic beliefs might have influenced Druze theology, particularly in concepts of divine knowledge and reincarnation. These influences and incorporations of Christian elements encompass the adoption of the concept of Christianizing al-Mahdi's persona among the Druze, as well as the integration of verses from the Bible concerning the Messiah by certain Druze founders.

In terms of religious comparison, mainstream Christian denominations do not believe in reincarnation or the transmigration of the soul, contrary to the beliefs of the Druze. Christianity teaches evangelism, often through the establishment of missions, unlike the Druze who do not accept converts to their faith. Marriage outside the Druze faith is rare and is strongly discouraged. Similarities between the Druze and Christians include commonalities in their view of monogamous marriage and divorce, as well as belief in the oneness of God and theophany.

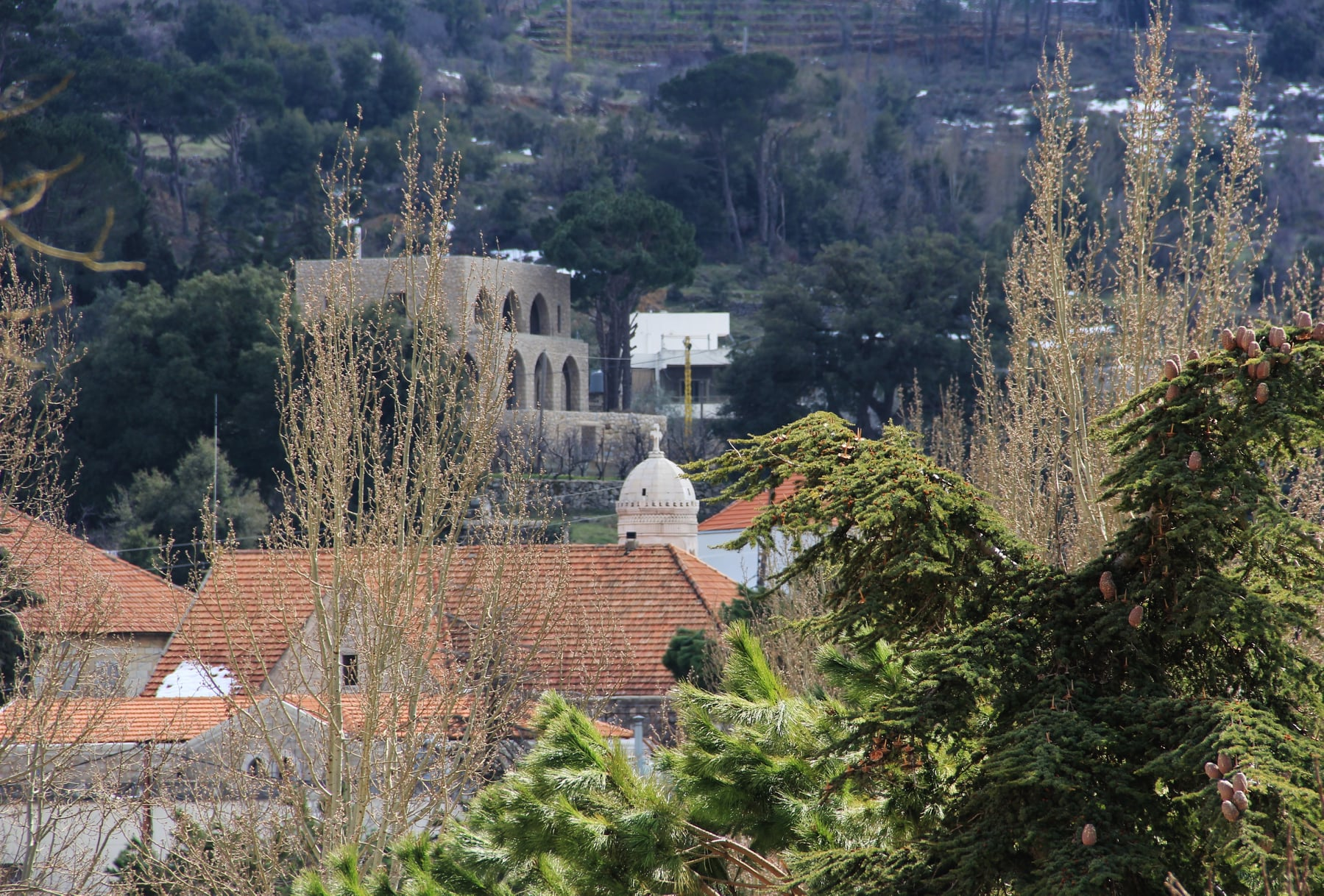
Christian Church and Druze Khalwa in Chouf District: Historically; the Druzes and the Christians in the Shuf Mountains lived in complete harmony.

Christianity does not require male circumcision, with covenant theology teaching that the Christian sacrament of baptism fulfills the Israelite practice of circumcision, both being signs and seals of the covenant of grace. Most mainstream Christian denominations currently maintain a neutral position on the practice of non-religious circumcision. Male circumcision is commonly practiced in many predominantly Christian countries and many Christian communities, and in the Coptic Orthodox Church, the Ethiopian Orthodox Church and the Eritrean Orthodox Tewahedo Church it is seen as a rite of passage. While male circumcision is widely practiced by the Druze, the procedure is practiced as a cultural tradition, and has no religious significance in the Druze faith. Some Druzes do not circumcise their male children, and refuse to observe this practice.

Both faiths give a prominent place to Jesus: Jesus is the central figure of Christianity, and in the Druze faith, Jesus is considered an important prophet of God, being among the seven prophets who appeared in different periods of history. The Druze revere Jesus "the son of Joseph and Mary" and his four disciples, who wrote the Gospels. According to the Druze manuscripts Jesus is the Greatest Imam and the incarnation of Ultimate Reason (Akl) on earth and the first cosmic principle (Hadd), and regards Jesus and Hamza ibn Ali as the incarnations of one of the five great celestial powers, who form part of their system. In the Druze tradition, Jesus is known under three titles: the True Messiah (al-Masih al-Haq), the Messiah of all Nations (Masih al-Umam), and the Messiah of Sinners. This is due, respectively, to the belief that Jesus delivered the true Gospel message, the belief that he was the Saviour of all nations, and the belief that he offers forgiveness.

Both religions venerate the Virgin Mary, John the Baptist, Saint George, Elijah, Luke the Evangelist, Job and other common figures. Figures in the Old Testament such as Adam, Noah, Abraham, and Moses are considered important prophets of God in the Druze faith, being among the seven prophets who appeared in different periods of history. In the Old Testament, Jethro was Moses' father-in-law, a Kenite shepherd and priest of Midian. Shuaib or Jethro of Midian is considered an ancestor of the Druze who revere him as their spiritual founder and chief prophet.

Historians notes that the Druze have historically maintained a positive relationship with Christians, as evidenced by shared traditions and social practices in Mount Lebanon. This interaction has led to overlapping symbols, customs, mutual veneration of saints and their shrines, and shared terminology for God. Sites such as the Church of Saidet et Tallé in Deir el Qamar, historically a popular Marian pilgrimage site among the Druze, exemplify this cultural exchange. The Druze also venerate Christian saints like Saint George and the Prophet Elijah, admired for their "bravery and warrior-like qualities". Scholar Pierre-Yves Beaurepaire observes that these warrior saints resonate with the Druze due to their parallels with Druze militarized traditions.

== Relationship with Hinduism ==
Hinduism and Christianity differ in their fundamental beliefs with regard to heaven, hell and reincarnation, to name a few. From the Hindu perspective, heaven (Sanskrit svarga) and hell (Naraka) are temporary places, where every soul has to live, either for the good deeds which they have done or for the sins which they have committed.

There are also significant similarities between Christian and Hindu theology, most notably, both religions present a trinitarian view of God. The Holy Trinity in Christianity, which consists of the Father, the Son, and the Holy Spirit, is sometimes seen as being roughly analogous to the Trimurti in Hinduism, whose members—Brahma, Vishnu, and Shiva—are seen as the three principal manifestations of Brahman, or Godhead. However, Brahma, Vishnu, and Shiva are recognized as distinct deities as opposed to a singular being, thus the Trimurti is closer to modalist heresy than to orthodox trinitarian doctrine.

Christian-Hindu relations are a mixed affair. On one hand, Hinduism's natural tendency has been to recognize the divine basis of various other religions, and to revere their founders and saintly practitioners. In Western countries, Vedanta has influenced some Christian thinkers, while others in the anti-cult movement have reacted against the activities of immigrant gurus and their followers. (See also: Pierre Johanns, Abhishiktananda, Bede Griffiths, Dalit theology.)

The Christian ashram movement, a movement within Christianity in India, embraces Vedanta and the teachings of the East, attempting to combine the Christian faith with the Hindu ashram model and Christian monasticism with the Hindu sannyasa tradition. Brahmoism is considered a syncretism of Hinduism with Protestantism or Lutheranism.

== Relationship with Islam ==
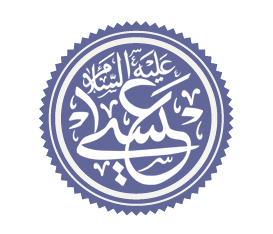
The name Jesus son of Mary written in Islamic calligraphy followed by Peace be upon him

Islam shares a number of beliefs with Christianity. They share similar views on judgment, heaven, hell, spirits, angels, and a future resurrection. Jesus is acknowledged as a prophet by Muslims. However, while Islam relegates him to a lesser status than God — "in the company of those nearest to God" in the Qur'an, mainstream (Trinitarian) Christianity since the Council of Nicea teaches without question the belief that Jesus is both fully man and fully God the Son, one of the three Hypostases (common English: persons) of Christianity's Trinity, divinely co-equal and co-eternal with the Father and the Holy Spirit.

Both religions share the belief in the virgin birth of Jesus, his miracles and healings, and they also share the belief that he ascended bodily into heaven. However, Jesus is not accepted as the Son of God by Muslims, who strictly maintain the belief that he was a human being who was loved by God and exalted to the ranks of the most righteous by God. They believe that God is a single entity, and do not accept the first person in the Trinity as God as the vast majority of Christians do. Additionally, Muslims do not accept Jesus's literal crucifixion and subsequent resurrection. Since Muslims believe in the worship of a strictly monotheistic form of God the Father who they do not believe assumed human form in the Holy Trinity through Jesus Christ, they do not accept the use of icons to worship God, which they consider shirk (idolatry). Muslim influence played a part in the initiation of iconoclasm and their conquests caused the iconoclasm in the Byzantine Empire. For the same reason, they do not worship or pray to Muhammad, Jesus, or any other prophets; they only pray to God.

Adherents of Islam have historically referred to themselves, Jews, and Christians (among others) as People of the Book since they all base their religion on Abrahamic books that are considered to have a divine origin. Christians, with the notable exception of Chrislam adherents, neither recognize the Qur'an as a genuine book of divine revelation, nor agree with its lowly assessment of Jesus only as a prophet, on par with Muhammad, nor for that matter accept that Muhammad was a genuine prophet of God. In the 7th century text Concerning Heresy, Saint John of Damascus named Islam as Christological heresy, referring to it as the "heresy of the Ishmaelites" (see medieval Christian views on Muhammad). The position has remained popular in Christian circles well into the 20th century, by theologians such as the Congregationalist cleric Frank Hugh Foster and the Roman Catholic historian Hilaire Belloc, the latter of who described it as "the great and enduring heresy of Mohammed."

Most Muslims, for their part, believe that parts of the Gospels, Torah and Jewish prophetic books have been forgotten, misinterpreted, or distorted by their followers. Based on that perspective, Muslims view the Qur'an as correcting the errors of traditional Judeo-Christianity. For example, with the exception of Messianic Islam and sometimes Koranism, Muslims in general on an anti-Catholic basis reject belief in the Trinity or any other expression of the divinity of Jesus as incompatible with monotheism.

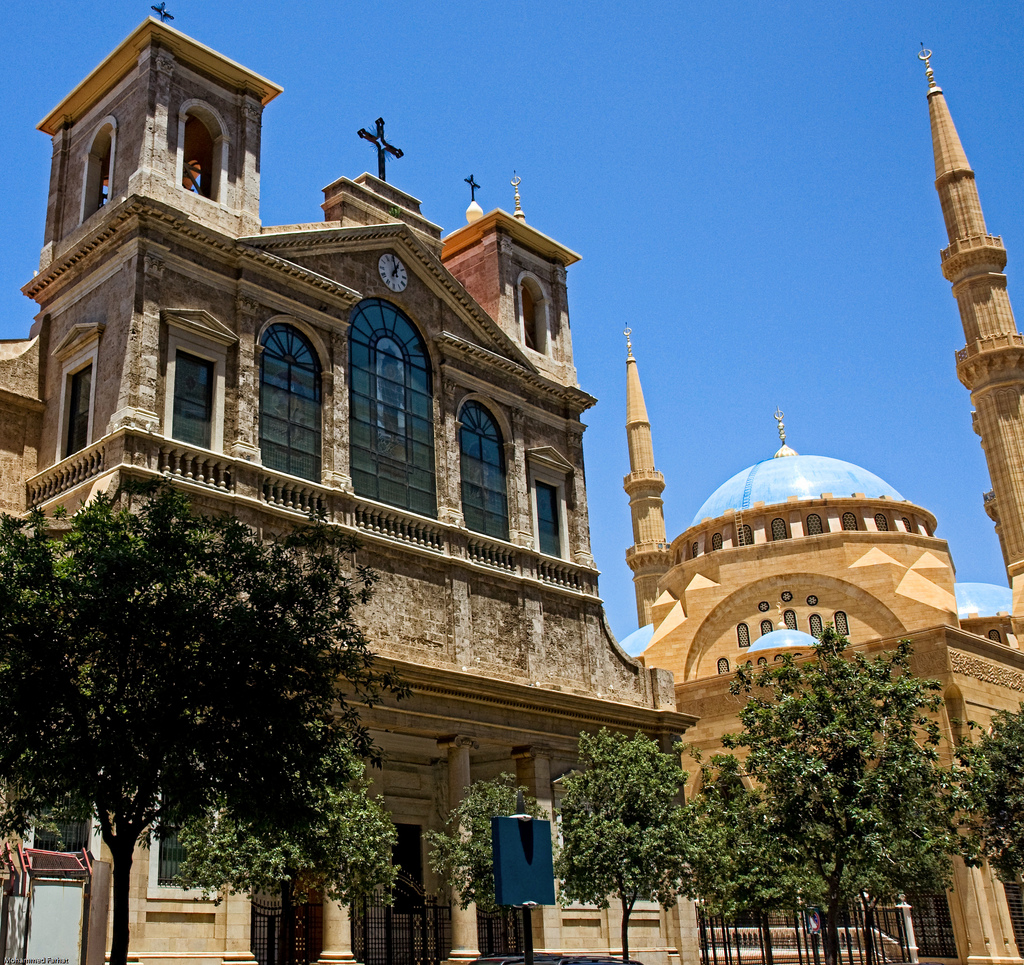
Saint George Maronite Cathedral and the Mohammad Al-Amin Mosque, Beirut

The two faiths have often experienced mutual controversy and conflict (an example being the Crusades, fought in response to Islamic conquests and attitudes to non-Muslims, in the near and Middle East). At the same time, much fruitful dialogue has occurred with the Catholic Church as well, especially since in the wake of the modernizing liberal reforms of Vatican 2 regarding proper Catholic relations with many other major world religions. The writings of Catholic theologian Thomas Aquinas frequently cite those of the Jewish philosopher Moses Maimonides, as well as Muslim thinker Averroes ('Ibn-Rushd).

On the other hand, the two faiths have experienced mutual peaceful coexistence, interaction, and cultural and sociala, and there was a cultural and human exchange between the Christian and Islamic worlds. The Muslim world is home to some of the world's most ancient Christian communities, and some of the most important cities of the Christian world—including three of its five great patriarchates (Alexandria, Antioch, and Constantinople). Scholars and intellectuals agree Christians have made significant contributions to Arab and Islamic civilization since the introduction of Islam, and they have had a significant impact contributing the culture of the Middle East and North Africa and other areas. Pew Research Center estimates indicate that in 2010, more than 64 million Christians lived in countries with Muslim majorities (excluding Nigeria). The Pew Forum study finds that Indonesia (21.1 million) has the largest Christian population in the Muslim world, followed by Egypt, Chad and Kazakhstan.

According to a 2020 Pew Research Center study, the Christian population in the world’s 53 Muslim-majority countries was approximately 168 million, including Nigeria. By comparison, the Muslim population living in the world’s 120 Christian-majority countries was estimated at around 159 million. Nigeria (92.7 million), Indonesia (28.2 million), and Egypt (about 8 million) host the largest Christian minorities in the Muslim world, while Ethiopia (43.1 million), Tanzania (18.2 million), and Russia (11.9 million) host the largest Muslim minorities in the Christian world.

On May 6, 2001, Pope John Paul II, the first pope to pray in a mosque, delivered an address at Umayyad Mosque in Damascus, saying: "It is important that Muslims and Christians continue to explore philosophical and theological questions together, in order to come to a more objective and comprehensive knowledge of each other's religious beliefs. Better mutual understanding will surely lead, at the practical level, to a new way of presenting our two religions not in opposition, as has happened too often in the past, but in partnership for the good of the human family." This Mosque of Damascus is famous for containing the head of John the Baptist.

== Relationship with Judaism ==
The relationship between Christianity and Judaism has been strained. In the past, Christians were often taught that "the Jews" killed Christ, for whose "murder" they bear a collective guilt (an interpretation which most major denominations now reject). Meanwhile, Jews have tended to associate Christianity with various pogroms, or in better times, they have tended to associate it with the dangers of assimilation. Anti-Semitism has a long history in Christianity (see Antisemitism in Christianity), and it is far from dead (for example, it exists in contemporary Russia). However, since the Holocaust, much dialogue which is aimed at Christian–Jewish reconciliation has taken place, and relations between Jews and Christians have greatly improved. Today, many conservative evangelicals support Christian Zionism, much to the irritation of Arab Christians, partly based on the Millennialist belief that the modern state of Israel represents the fulfillment of Biblical prophecy.

According to Anna Sapir Abulafia, most scholars agree that Jews and Christians in Latin Christendom lived in relative peace with one another until the 13th century. Sicut Judaeis (the "Constitution for the Jews") was the official position of the papacy regarding Jews throughout the Middle Ages and later. The first papal bull was issued in about 1120 by Calixtus II, intended to protect Jews who suffered during the First Crusade, and was reaffirmed by many popes, even until the 15th century although they were not always strictly upheld. The bull forbade, besides other things, Christians from coercing Jews to convert, or to harm them, or to take their property, or to disturb the celebration of their festivals, or to interfere with their cemeteries, on pain of excommunication.

The phenomenon of Messianic Judaism has become something of an irritant to Jewish / Christian relations. Messianic Jews, who generally seek to combine a Jewish identity with the recognition of Jesus, are rejected by mainstream Jewish groups, who dismiss Messianic Judaism as little more than Christianity with Jewish undertones.

The Jewish conception of the messiah (משיח mashiach in Hebrew) holds certain similarities to that of Christians, yet there are substantial differences. According to Jews, the Hebrew Scriptures contain a small number of prophecies concerning a future descendant of King David, who will be anointed (Hebrew: moshiach) as the Jewish people's new leader and will establish the throne of David in Jerusalem forever. In the Jewish view, this fully human and mortal leader will rebuild the land of Israel and restore the Davidic Kingdom. This subject is covered in the section on Jewish eschatology. Some Christians have a different understanding of the term messiah, and believe that Jesus is the messiah referred to in the Old Testament prophecies; that the kingdom in these prophecies was to be a heavenly kingdom, not an earthly one; and that Jesus' words and actions in the New Testament provide evidence of his identity as messiah and that the remainder of messianic prophecy will be fulfilled in the Second Coming. Other Christians acknowledge the Jewish definition of messiah, and hold that Jesus fulfills this, being 'fully man' (in addition to being 'fully God'), and believe that the Second Coming will establish the Kingdom of God on earth, where Jesus, as messiah and descendant from David, will reign from Jerusalem.

== Relationship with Mithraism and Sol Invictus ==
There are many parallels between Mithraism, the religion of Sol Invictus, and Christianity. Aurelian is believed to have established the Dies Natalis Solis Invicti (Day of the Birth of Sol Invictus) as an annual festival held on the day when the sun's daily declination visibly starts rising again after the winter solstice, namely on December 25; the birth of the central figure was thus celebrated on the day which Christians later used to celebrate Jesus' birth (having always celebrated this on Epiphany). Other similarities include the stories of Christ and Mithra as children being visited by shepherds, the trinity, and the immortal soul. Sunday itself was imposed as the official day of rest by Constantine, who referred to it as the Day of the venerable Sun. (Although Christians worshiped on Sunday from at least 150 years before Constantine)

The earliest attestation of Mithraism is Plutarch's record of it being practised in 68BC by Cilician pirates, the first mithraists. Tertullian, a Christian writer who lived between the 2nd and 3rd centuries, admitted there was a strong similarity between the practises of the two faiths:

the devil, ... mimics even the essential portions of the divine sacraments...he baptises some, that is his own believers, ... he promises the forgiveness of sins... Mithraism, .... also celebrates the oblation of bread, and introduces a symbol of the resurrection... – Tertullian

Justin Martyr, an earlier 2nd century Church Father, agreed that the similarities existed, claiming that Mithraism had copied the Eucharist. Justin argued that the devil had invented Mithraism to mock Christianity. Christian apologist Ronald H. Nash stated:

allegations of an early Christian dependence on Mithraism have been rejected on many grounds. Mithraism had no concept of the death and resurrection of its god and no place for any concept of rebirth—at least during its early stages...During the early stages of the cult, the notion of rebirth would have been foreign to its basic outlook...Moreover, Mithraism was basically a military cult. Therefore, one must be skeptical about suggestions that it appealed to nonmilitary people like the early Christians.

== Relationship with Scientology ==
In the 2008 book Vintage Jesus: Timeless Answers to Timely Questions, authors Mark Driscoll and Gerry Breshears write: "According to Scientology, Jesus is an 'implant' forced upon a Thetan about a million years ago", and Jack Huberman writes in 101 People Who Are Really Screwing America that in Scientology Jesus is seen as having been "implanted in humanity's collective memory", by the character Xenu from Scientology space opera.

Professor Paul Blankenship of the Memphis Theological Seminary studied Scientology and commented on this view, saying "They do not do a lot of talking about God or Jesus. It's more getting your mind cleared, and I could see how they could say that that could be compatible. Scientology has not really developed into a complete religious tradition. They may very well develop."

The Church of Scientology claims that their belief system is different from Christianity because it is based "solely on reason" and that its members "possess a practical system of ethics and justice." The church likewise claims that "anything religious teachers said or Buddha promised, even the visions of Christianity, are attained in Scientology as a result." Muck, Netland and McDermott emphasize that this clearly shows that Scientology is incompatible with Christianity.

In the book New Religions and the Theological Imagination in America (1995) by Mary Farrell Bednarowski, the author comments that "In the game of life as Scientology understands it, sin does not call for repentance as much as it does the eradication of error, and that must come through the technology, the auditing process, sometimes referred to as pastoral counseling. In fact, in regard to getting rid of sin, Scientology sees parallels between the goals of its technology and Jesus's saving action." Bednarowski quotes from the Scientology publication The Scientology Catechism in noting these parallels between the stated mission of Scientologists and the teachings imparted by Christ to his disciples. She notes that Scientology founder L. Ron Hubbard is not regarded in Scientology as a "divine savior", but rather a "loved friend and teacher". Writing in Signs of the Times: The New Religious Movements in Theological Perspective (1996), John A. Saliba cites Mary Bednarowski, and goes on to note "Helle Medgaard asserts that Scientology also misunderstands Jesus and repudiates the key Christian doctrine of the forgiveness of sins." In his book The Sociology of Religious Movements (1996), William Sims Bainbridge cites the research of Roy Wallis, in noting "Scientology ... has no discernible connection to Christianity".

== Possible relationship with Zoroastrianism through Judaism ==
Many scholars believe that the eschatology of Judaism and the idea of monotheism as a whole possibly originated in Zoroastrianism, and it may have been transferred to Judaism during the Babylonian captivity, and it eventually influenced Christian theology. Bible scholar P.R. Ackroyd states: "the whole eschatological scheme, however, of the Last Judgment, rewards and punishments, etc., within which immortality is achieved, is manifestly Zoroastrian in origin and inspiration." However, the theory is questioned by other mainstream historians and scholars. The Oxford History of the Biblical World states "There is little if any effect of Zoroastrian elements on Judaism in the Persian period." Nevertheless, scholars such as Soloman Nigosian contend, in regarding the similar ideas of Zoroaster and later Jewish writers, that "the ideas were indigenous to Iran...it is hardly conceivable that some of the characteristic ideas and practices in Judaism, Christianity, and Islam came into being without Zoroastrian influence." The new faith (Zoroastrianism) emerged in larger Persian empires. "Zoroastrianism reflected the cosmopolitan society of the empires". During this time Zoroastrianism profoundly effected the beliefs and values of Judaism, Christianity, and Islam ("Traditions & Encounters: A brief global History", Jerry H. Bentley. pg. 93). It is also possible that Zoroastrianism and later Jewish theology came from a common source.

For more on this theory, see Jewish history, Judaism, and Zoroastrianism.

In the Younger Avesta, three divinities of the Zoroastrian pantheon are repeatedly identified as ahuric, meaning that each, as Ahura, act together in both representing and protecting Asha, or the divine truth governing the universe. These three are Ahura Mazda, Mithra and Burz, and hence known as the "Ahuric triad." Similarities with the Christian Trinity can be seen between Ahura Mazda and God the Father, Mithra and Christ the Logos, as well as between Burz and the Holy Spirit, both of which are associated symbolically with water. Zoroastrianism and Christianity consider themselves to be monotheistic, but like all other monotheisms they have highlighted certain aspects or energies of the divine to emphasize, and these are not meant to be interpreted as separate divinities. In both religions there are guardian angels, or fravashi, which are considered to be created beings and are distinct from the Energies of God or divine emanations. The Zoroastrian term yazata, however, has variously been interpreted as meaning emanations or "sparks" of the divine, or as being roughly synonymous with the term "angels." There have been various theories on the possible relationship between these aspects of Zoroastrianism and ideas of divine emanation in esoteric Christianity, Jewish Kabbalah, Islamic mysticism (Sufism), and other religious systems, such as Gnosticism, Yazidism, and the Druze, among others.

== Sociological aspects ==
The spread of Christianity has been international, and in some cases it has entirely displaced the religions of those people who it was proselytized to and it has also altered their customs. At times, this centuries-long process has been met with violent opposition, and likewise, the spread of Christianity has been carried out with martial force in some cases. To some extent, the relationship between Christianity and other faiths has been encumbered by this history, and modern Christians, particularly in the West, have expressed embarrassment over the violence which existed in Christianity's past.

The conversion of adherents of other religions is widely accepted within Christianity. Many Christian organizations believe that they have a duty to make converts among every people. In recent years, ecumenism and dialogue between different religions has been endorsed by many official representatives of the Christian churches, as a way of effecting reconciliation between Christian people and people of other faiths, leading to many cases of reconciliation. In some cases, this endorsement is accompanied by a complete disavowal of all proselytizing efforts under the banner of religious pluralism.

This is specially marked by the inauguration, or installation, of Archbishop of York Dr John Sentamu from Uganda, on November 29, 2005. Dr Sentamu is the first black African archbishop of the Church of England. He is also the first archbishop to beat bongo drums in the cathedral at his own inauguration. The newspaper Guardian, which dedicated the double middle page of the following day's issue to a full picture of the grinning archbishop in full apparel at the porch of the cathedral, said that: "Dr Sentamu's sermon was a stern lecture to the Church of England to grow out of being a 'judgmental and moralising' congregation of 'pew-fillers, sermon-taters, Bible readers, even born-again believers and Spirit-filled charismatics' and go out to make friends in the world. 'We have lost the joy and power that makes real disciples and we've become consumers of religion, not disciples of Jesus-Christ', he said. 'Christians, go and make friends among Buddhists, Hindus, Jews, Muslims, Sikhs, agnostics, atheists, not for the purpose of converting them to your beliefs but for friendship, understanding, listening, hearing.' His remarks were greeted with applause, not with silence as the order of the service instructed."

A special case is the issue of Christian–Jewish reconciliation, in which significant reconciliation has been reached.

=== Syncretism ===
Christian converts have often carried some of their former customs into their new faith. On occasion, this has led to syncretisms, that are often not accepted by mainstream Christians:

- In Cuban Santería, the West African orishas are venerated in the shape of Catholic saints.
- The Chinese Taiping Rebels replaced the Bible with the Confucian classics.
- The God's Army of Myanmar mixed Karen traditions with Protestantism.
- The Vietnamese syncretic religion Cao Dai locates Jesus in the celestial Council of Great Spirits that directs the universe. It also has a pope with an elaborate hierarchy and its temples are influenced by Catholic churches.
- The Lacandon people of Central America acknowledge Äkyantho', the god of foreigners. He has a son named Hesuklistos (Jesus Christ) who is supposed to be the god of the foreigners. They recognize that Hesuklistos is a god but do not feel he is worthy of worship as he is a minor god.

== See also ==
- Christ myth theory
- Christian views on astrology
- Christian views on magic
- Comparative religion
- Institute for Interreligious Dialogue
- Interfaith dialogue
- Islam and other religions
- Jewish views on religious pluralism
- Missiology
- Theology of religions
