= Catherine Cornille =

Belgian-American comparative theologian

Catherine Cornille (born 1961) is a Belgian-American theologian. She is a professor of comparative theology with a specialization in the theology of religions and interreligious dialogue. She is the Newton College Alumnae Chair of Western Culture at Boston College.

== Biography ==
Cornille received a B.A. from KU Leuven and an M.A. from the University of Hawaiʻi. She completed her Ph.D. at KU Leuven in 1989, where she also taught comparative religion. She joined the department of theology at Boston College in 2005 and teaches comparative theology, theology of religions, and inter-religious dialogue.

== Works ==
- Cornille, Catherine (1992). The Guru in Indian Catholicism: Ambiguity of Opportunity of Inculturation?. Grand Rapids, Michigan: Wm. B. Eerdmans Publishing. ISBN 978-0-8028-0566-9.
- Cornille, Catherine (2008). The Im-possibility of Interreligious Dialogue. Crossroad Publishing Company. ISBN 978-0-8245-2464-7.
- Cornille, Catherine, ed. (2010). Many Mansions? Multiple Religious Belonging and Christian Identity. Eugene, OR: Wipf and Stock Publishers. ISBN 978-1-60899-453-3.
- Cornille, Catherine; Bloechl, Jeffrey (2015). Christian Identity: Between Secularity and Plurality. Banglalore: Dharmaram Publications. ISBN 9789384964344.
