= Exclusivism =

Disregard for opinions and ideas different from one's own

Exclusivism is the practice of being exclusive, a mentality characterized by the disregard for opinions and ideas which are different from one's own, or the practice of organizing entities into groups by excluding those entities which possess certain traits.

== Religious exclusivism ==
Religious exclusivism, one of the three classic typologies which describe religions relative to one another, states that one religion, to the exclusion of all others, has the correct understanding of God, truth and salvation, and eternal paradise is contingent on one's belief in the core tenets of that religion.

According to American religious professor, Diana Eck:

Exclusivism is more than simply a conviction about the transformative power of the particular vision one has; it is a conviction about its finality and its absolute priority over competing views.

While it was originally used to define Christianity, exclusivism can apply to any religious belief system, as can Race's other two categories inclusivism and pluralism. In his 1982 Christians and Religious Pluralism, Race defined pluralism as all religions being equally beneficial, with no single religion dominating. Inclusivism attempts to straddle the poles of pluralism and exclusivism by agreeing with the latter that one religion (Christianity) has the most value, and agreeing with the former by stating that other religions still have significant value. While Race's three categories have been criticized, amended and refuted, most religious studies and interfaith scholars and students find the typologies useful as a starting point for conversations about the diversity of religions.

Accordingly, the Nichiren Shoshu religion based on the foothills of Mount Fuji, Japan is an example of an ultra-traditionalist Buddhist sect claiming only it is The True Buddhism based on the exclusivist teachings of the 13th-century Buddhist priest Nichiren (1222–1282).

== Three—point typology ==
=== Pluralism ===
Pluralism was borne out of a criticism of exclusivism, saying that no single tradition has a monopoly on revelation or salvation, and that we have no way to judge between the salvific claims by adherents of any faith tradition. Paul Hedges suggests that each religion knows "transcendent reality ('God') yet in partial perspective", much like the oft-quoted parable of the seven blind men and the elephant. Gavin D'Costa says pluralists have two main critiques of exclusivists: that they do not know their own scriptures well enough, and people of other religions are good and loving. Alvin Plantinga says that pluralists' problem with exclusivism stems from its seeming immorality and arrogance. He quotes William Cantwell Smith (a leading proponent of pluralism):

Except at the cost of insensitivity or delinquency, it is morally not possible actually to go out into the world and say to devout, intelligent, fellow human beings: '…we believe that we know God and we are right; you believe that you know God, and you are totally wrong.

Along with Smith, another major proponent of pluralism is John Hick, who writes:

[Exclusivism], with its baleful historical influence, in validating centuries of anti-semitism, the colonial exploitation by Christian Europe of what today we call the third world, and the subordination of women within a strongly patriarchal religious system, not only causes misgivings among many Christians but also alarms many of our non-Christian neighbors, creating invisible but powerful barriers within the human community.

D'Costa has argued persuasively that logically, pluralism can no longer be considered a category, because when it makes the declarative truth claim that no single faith has a monopoly on revelation or salvation, it becomes another form of exclusivism.

=== Inclusivism ===
Inclusivism claims that aspects of the one true religious belief can be represented in other religions. A specific form of Christian inclusivism holds that, while Christianity is true, other truths can be found in fragments within other religions. Karl Rahner states it succinctly: "Insofar as they in good conscience practice what is good in their religion, people in other religions receive God's grace and are 'anonymous Christians', people who are being saved through Christ, though they do not realize it." Inclusivists point to the biblical parable of the sheep and the goats in which the saved sheep show surprise at being rewarded for their service to Jesus (Matthew 25:31-40). According to Alan Race, the history of the Abrahamic faiths' exclusivism – as well as inclusivism – goes back to the words of the Bible and the Quran. Christian exclusivists point to the gospel of John (14:6), which quotes Jesus as saying, "I am the way and the truth and the life. No one comes to the Father except through me". After Jesus' death, his disciple Peter said publicly, "Salvation is found in no one else, for there is no other name under heaven given to mankind by which we must be saved" (Acts 4:12). Likewise, the Quran (3:85) states, "If anyone desires a religion other than Islam (submission to Allah), never will it be accepted of him; and in the Hereafter He will be in the ranks of those who have lost (all spiritual good)". While Judaism does not stress salvation, the First Commandment (Exodus 20:3) is "You shall have no other gods before me". Race says, "The tension between Christian experience and the recognition of potential authentic practice outside of the Christian revelation, in fact has always existed in Christian history from the beginning, from the words of Jesus himself in the gospel of Luke: in Luke 9:50 he says, 'He who is not against us is for us'". Daniel Strange points out what Race neglects to mention that in the same gospel (11:23) Jesus says, "He who is not with me is against me".

== "No salvation outside the Church" ==
In the Roman Catholic Church, the idea of "no salvation outside of the (Christian) church" (Latin: Extra Ecclesiam Nulla Salus) has roots as early as the Christian patriarch Origen of Alexandria in the third century. However, the doctrine is often interpreted as not referring merely to the visible church, or as meaning that for non-Christians who are saved, their salvation is mediated by the church.

While the Bible speaks about many topics of inclusion, diversity and tolerance in both the Old and New Testament – attitudes toward the alien and stranger; the hope of Christians being drawn from all nations and languages; God's universal care and sustaining of creation; the universal scope of the gospel and the universal mandate to take the gospel to the nations the overwhelming feeling in the Church throughout most of its history mimics that of the Council of Florence in 1422:

The Council firmly believes, professes and proclaims that those not living within the Catholic Church, not only pagans, but Jews, heretics and schismatics, cannot participate in eternal life, but will depart into everlasting fire which has been prepared for the devil and his angels.

The former German Catholic priest and later renowned Protestant, Martin Luther continued the exclusivist theological bent:

For where Christ is not preached, there is no Holy Spirit to create, call and gather the Christian Church, and outside it no one can come to the Lord Christ.

In the 20th century, the missionary movement, through the Dutch missionary Hendrik Kraemer wrote that Jesus is the one who has the complete authority to judge other religions' efficacy. Highlighting a unique contemporary take on the salvation problem, Strange introduces George Lindbeck's contention that those who do not know the Bible cannot be condemned for their lack of knowledge.

== New wave of exclusivism ==
Mara Brecht states that the problem with classic exclusivism is that it deals mainly with Christianity and salvation (or "top down"). She highlights the work of the "New Wave of exclusivism," led by Griffiths, D'Costa and Netland, who employ a "bottom up" approach to religious diversity. New Wave Exclusivists focus more on the religious believers' "ways of knowing and understanding of religious beliefs as expressive truth," resulting in a broader possibility for interfaith engagement. For example, Netland sets aside comparing religions' salvation when he says dialogue should focus on the most important question all religions deal with – the question of truth. Brecht reaches the conclusion that exclusivism is tenable for Christians – and by extension other religious believers – if believers come into contact with believers of other religions who can possibly "defeat" their own, so they can have something to base their truth claims on. Brecht says, "Practically, this means that, for example, reflective Christians will consider their beliefs to be as probable as alternatives from within their own tradition, somewhat more probable than the relevant alternatives from within Judaism and considerably more probable than Buddhist alternatives. In other words, believers will weigh their beliefs against other beliefs."

== Divisions of exclusivism ==
Douglas Pratt further defines exclusivism, dividing it into three subdivisions – open, closed and extreme. Citing t'Hooft and Kraemer, Pratt says open exclusivism, while never ceding the superior position, 'may at least be amenably disposed toward the other,' if only in order to know Them well enough for possible conversion. The relationship is not entered into on equal ground, therefore, nor with the openness to a significant reciprocal change of self-identity. If dialogue is entered into, it is only for mutual edification and an increase in good will. Closed exclusivism offers no chance for a relationship, other than acknowledging the other's right to exist. An extreme, hard-line exclusivism often leads to a fundamentalist perspective. Pratt writes:

Fundamentalism, as a mindset, is a mentality that expresses the modern quest for universality and coherence writ large: only one truth; one authority; one authentic narrative that accounts for all; one right way to be.

The negation of otherness is perhaps critical, for it involves a devaluing and dismissal of the "other," whether in terms of rival community or competing alterities, ideological or otherwise. In the process of negating the other, the self is asserted as inherently superior. My god is greater than your god.

The American religious professor, Paul Moser posits two forms of exclusivism: logical religious exclusivism, which asserts that since the contradictory, foundational truth claims for each religion excludes some or many of them from being true; and the doxastic redemptive exclusivism based on the Athanasian Creed, which states if a person does not believe the Christian concept of the Trinity, that person is condemned. Moser further believes that a God who would exclude people from salvation for neither hearing nor understanding the concept of the Trinity does not have a moral character, and is therefore undeserving of worship.

== Exclusivism in other religions ==
While most attention of exclusivism points toward Christianity, many religions have a branch that falls into the exclusivist category. D'Costa points out whether one considers oneself Buddhist or Hindu or Muslim – or indeed a pluralist – each version states that "only one single revelation or one single religion is true and all other 'revelations' or religions are false" without providing any scriptural support for his claim.

While acknowledging that historically, Christianity showed the most extreme forms of exclusivism, Pratt contends that many fundamentalist religions compete for that title, with Islam leading other worthy contenders in ways that are not always obvious. The purging of the Rohingya in Myanmar, for example, is portrayed as an exclusivism of the Buddhist traditions.

== In Ancient Greece ==
The Decree of Diopithes (430 BCE) forbade the worship of and belief in gods other than those of the Olympian pantheon recognised by the Athenian polis. The introduction of other gods was treated as asebeia, or impiety, and was punishable by death. Several philosophers Anaxagoras, Protagoras, Socrates, Stilpo, Theodorus of Cyrene, Aristotle, and Theophrastus were accused of impiety under this decree. Socrates was found guilty of the charge of introducing new gods and condemned to death by drinking Conium maculatum. Antiochus IV Epiphanes, Seleucid ruler of Israel, decided to Hellenize the Jews by ordering the worship of Zeus; when they refused, Antiochus sent an army to enforce his decree.

According to Herodotus, the Caunians, a Greek people who claimed to have originated in Crete and settled in Asia Minor, worshiped the Olympian Gods exclusively. "They determined that they would no longer make use of the foreign temples which had been established among them, but would worship their own old ancestral Gods alone. Then their whole youth took arms, and striking the air with their spears, marched to the Calyndic frontier, declaring that they were driving out the foreign Gods."

Plato, in his Laws, advocates that the state should punish those who deny the existence of the Olympian Gods or believe that the gods exist but think they are indifferent to mankind or can easily be bought by bribes.

Interpretatio graeca, the common tendency of ancient Greek writers to identify foreign divinities with members of their own pantheon, can be seen as a kind of exclusivism. The syncretism of the Hellenistic period whereby aspects of the cults of foreign Gods such as iconography and epithets, can also be seen as a kind of exclusivism.

== Exclusivism and religious diversity in America ==
In a sociological survey of Americans and their relationship with religions other than Christianity, nearly 90 percent of respondents either strongly or somewhat agreed that "religious diversity has been good for America," which reinforces the idea that Americans value diversity and religious freedom. However, respondents who identified in the exclusivist category or believed that the United States was a Christian nation displayed much more negative views and a decreased willingness to include other religious people in the lives of their community. Stephen Merino concludes, "It may be that when many Americans think of 'religious diversity,' they have only Christian diversity in mind." Nevertheless, they also provided research to back up their statement, "Prior contact with non-Christians will be associated with more positive views of religious diversity and increased willingness to include non-Christians into social life."

== Exclusivism and truth ==
In answering the pluralist charge, and hearkening back to Netland, Brad Stetson baldly states, "It is possible exclusivism is true." It is this statement, he says, that upsets pluralists who charge exclusivists with arrogance and bad form. "It is simply not true, as pluralists imply, that disagreeing with someone […] about religious truth is tantamount to treating them badly.[…] [a]n exclusivist claim about religious truth is not defeated strictly because such claims are believed to militate against human harmony and peace." In addition, Hick, Smith and other pluralists balk at the idea that an all-loving God would condemn some people to hell, or that anyone actually deserves to be damned. Stetson quotes CS Lewis: "The doors of hell are locked on the inside."
