= Pneumatology =

Branch of Christian theology that studies the Holy Spirit

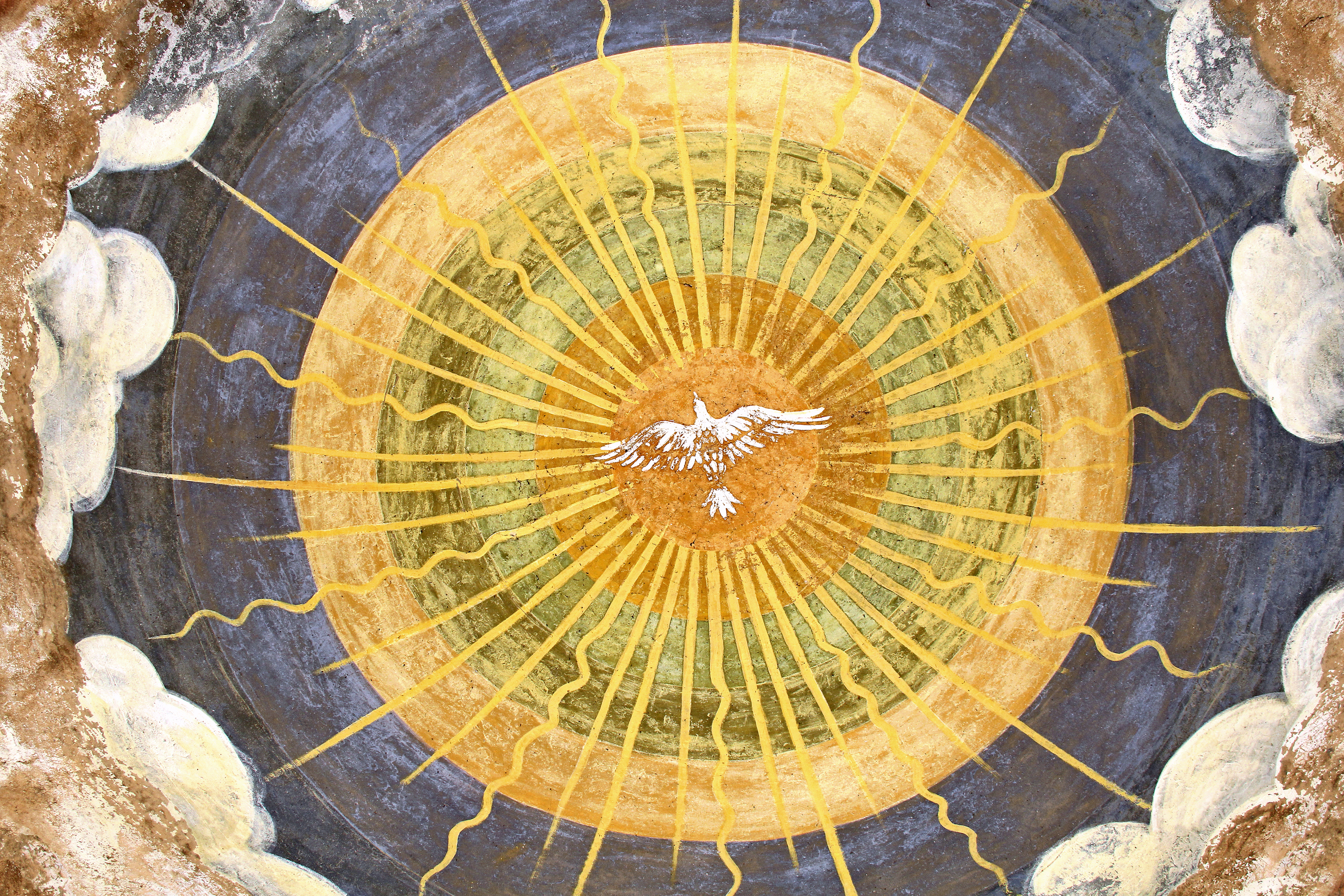
Symbolic representation of the Holy Spirit as a dove, from medieval Monastery of Žiča

Pneumatology refers to a particular discipline within Christian theology that focuses on the study of the Holy Spirit. The term is derived from the Greek word Pneuma (πνεῦμα), which designates "breath" or "spirit" and metaphorically describes a non-material being or influence. The English term pneumatology comes from two Greek words: πνεῦμα (pneuma, spirit) and λόγος (logos, teaching about). Pneumatology includes study of the person of the Holy Spirit, and the works of the Holy Spirit. This latter category also includes Christian teachings on new birth, spiritual gifts (charismata), Spirit-baptism, sanctification, the inspiration of prophets, and the indwelling of the Holy Trinity (which in itself covers many different aspects). Different Christian denominations have different theological approaches on various pneumatological questions.

== Development ==
History of Christian theology is traditionally divided into four main stages, representing also the main periods in historical development of Christian pneumatology:

1. Patristic period. The early Church engaged in a debate over the divinity of Jesus, with Arius asserting that the Son is a "creature" or "angel" and Athanasius countering that the Son possesses divine attributes (such as immutability, transcendence, ability to sanctify, and involvement in creation). Although the debate was not pneumatological in nature, it led to a very similar debate between the Pneumatomachians and the Cappadocian Fathers.
2. Medieval period. In this period ensued a debate regarding the relationship between Christ and the Holy Spirit. The Eastern Church asserted that the Holy Spirit "proceeds" from the Father alone (as stated in the Niceno-Constantinopolitan Creed), while Augustine of Hippo and the medieval Catholic Church added the "filioque" clause to the Creed (the Spirit proceeds from the Father "and the Son").
3. Reformation and Counter-Reformation. Here the relationship between the Spirit and the Scriptures is re-examined. Martin Luther and John Calvin hold that the Spirit has a certain "interpretive authority" to "illuminate" scripture, while Counter-Reformation theologians respond that the Spirit has authorized the Church to serve as authoritative interpreter of Scripture.
4. Contemporary era. The contemporary church understands a distinctive relationship between the Spirit and the Church community. Various contemporary theologians grant the Spirit as authority to govern the church, to liberate oppressed communities, and to create experiences associated with faith. Contemporary pneumatology is often marked by the Pentecostal Movement.

== See also ==
- Holy Spirit in Christianity
- God in Christianity
- Names of God in Christianity
- Patriology
- Christology
- Filioque
- Pneumatomachi
- Theological differences between the Catholic Church and the Eastern Orthodox Church

== Sources ==
- Burgess, Stanley M. (1989). The Holy Spirit: Eastern Christian Traditions. Peabody, Mass.: Hendrickson Publishers. ISBN 9780913573815.
- Graham A. Cole, He Who Gives Life: The Doctrine of the Holy Spirit (Wheaton, IL: Crossway, 2007)
- Ilesanmi, Dele A. (2023). Pneumagogy: A Proposed Theory for Effective Teaching and Learning in Christian Kingdom Education. In: African Journal of Kingdom Education, Vol. 1 (2).
- Kärkkäinen, Veli-Matti (2002). Pneumatology: The Holy Spirit in Ecumenical, International, and Contextual Perspective. Grand Rapids, MI: Baker Academic. ISBN 9780801024481.
- Kärkkäinen, Veli-Matti, ed. (2010). Holy Spirit and Salvation: The Sources of Christian Theology. Louisville, KY: Westminster John Knox Press. ISBN 9780664231361.
- Kasper, Walter (2004). "The renewal of pneumatology in contemporary Catholic life and theology: towards a rapprochement between east and west". That they may all be one: the call to the unity. London [u.a.]: Burns & Oates. ISBN 978-0-86012379-8.
- Linton M. Smith Jr. "Not By Might Nor By Power: The Bible Believer's Guide to the Doctrine of the Holy Spirit" (DayStar Publishing; Miamitown, OH 1995)
- John McIntyre, The shape of pneumatology: studies in the doctrine of the Holy Spirit (Edinburgh: T&T Clark, 1997)
- Meyendorff, John (1983). Byzantine Theology: Historical Trends and Doctrinal Themes (Revised 2nd ed.). New York: Fordham University Press. ISBN 9780823209675.
- G. James Olsen, "Why Angels Have Wings: A Pneumatological Assay of Beings from the Spirit Realms" (Chicago, IL: Eschaton, 1997)
