= Francis Xavier Clooney =

American Jesuit professor and scholar of Hinduism (born 1950)

The Reverend Dr. Francis X. Clooney SJ
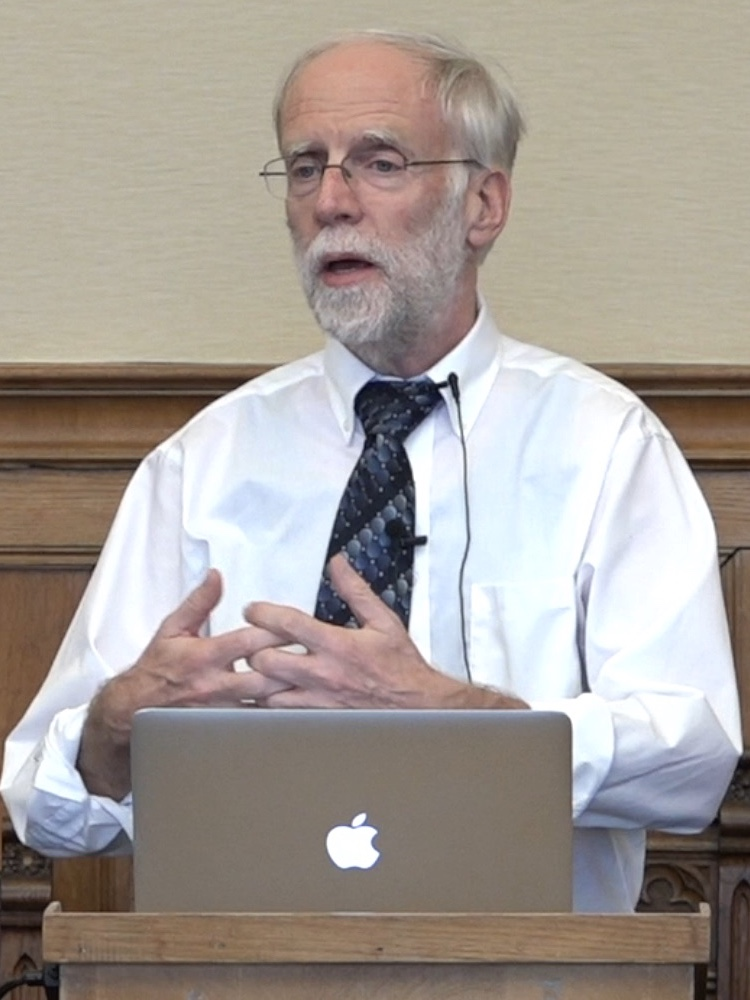
- Born: 1950 (age 75–76); Brooklyn, New York City, U.S.

Academic background
- Education: Fordham University; Weston School of Theology; University of Chicago

Academic work
- Discipline: Theology
- Institutions: Boston College; Harvard University
- Main interests: Comparative theology

Francis Xavier Clooney SJ FBA (born 1950) is an American Jesuit priest and scholar of Hinduism. He is currently a professor at Harvard Divinity School in Cambridge, Massachusetts.

== Career ==
A native of Brooklyn, New York, he graduated from Regis High School in Manhattan and entered the novitiate of Society of Jesus in 1968 and was subsequently ordained in 1978. Following that, he earned his bachelor's degree at Fordham University in the Bronx, New York.

After earning his doctorate in South Asian Languages and Civilizations at the University of Chicago in 1984, Clooney taught at Boston College until 2005, serving also as the Academic Director of the Oxford Centre for Hindu Studies (a recognised independent centre of the University of Oxford), when he became the Parkman Professor of Divinity and Professor of Comparative Theology at Harvard Divinity School. In 2010, he became the Director of Harvard's Center for the Study of World Religions but is no longer in that role. That same year he was named a Fellow of the British Academy.

His primary areas of scholarship are theological commentarial writings in the Sanskrit and Tamil traditions of Hindu India, and the developing field of comparative theology, a discipline distinguished by attentiveness to the dynamics of theological learning deepened and enriched through the study of traditions other than one's own. He has also written on the Jesuit missionary tradition, particularly in India, and the dynamics of dialogue in the contemporary world.

Clooney sits on editorial boards, was the first president of the International Society for Hindu-Christian Studies and, from 1998 to 2004, was coordinator for interreligious dialogue for the Jesuits of the United States. Clooney has authored several articles and books, and served as the editor of the OCHS Hindu Studies book series for Routledge. His current projects include a study of yoga and Jesuit spirituality.

In 2010, he was the recipient of Henry Luce III Fellow in Theology, awarded by the Association of Theological Schools. In 2017, he was nominated as the winner of the John Courtney Murray Award.

== Works ==
=== Hindu Wisdom for All God's Children ===
Hindu Wisdom for All God’s Children is an introduction to comparative theology. It provides a brief history of his experience with Hinduism during Clooney's time spent teaching in Nepal. This book doesn't initially require much previous knowledge of Hinduism or Indian culture to understand and therefore provides a good initial introduction to comparative theology and Clooney. It also shows what one can learn about God from the Hindu religious tradition by taking a look at various Hindu gods. Hindu Wisdom for All God's Children began first as a series of lectures given at John Carroll University in 1996 and was later developed into a book.

The book's introduction is significant to understanding Clooney's interest in eastern religions. As part of his early Jesuit training, Clooney was expected to teach high school. He chose to travel to Kathmandu, Nepal, and teach 9th-grade boys at St. Xavier's High School. Looking for a way to teach moral values to his students, Clooney turned to the Bhagavad Gita. This was the first time that Clooney had studied the Bhagavad Gita. Similarly, he also used the stories of the Buddha's life and teachings to relate to the Nepali boys he was teaching.

=== Hindu God, Christian God ===
In Hindu God, Christian God: How Reason Helps Break Down the Boundaries Between Religions, Clooney compares Christian theology and Hindu theology in four areas: the existence of God, what is the true God, divine embodiment, and the revelation of God. Clooney considers the similarities between Christianity and Hinduism's theological answers to these topics. Clooney then draws four major conclusions about God: the world is complex and there is a God who created the world, this God can be further identified by drawing reasonable conclusions about who God is and how He will likely act, God is not limited to the restrictiveness of a body but can choose to assume this limited form, and there is divine revelation. This book is helpful in seeing how Clooney's ideas about God develop through his studying of the theology of religions outside of Christianity.

== Personal life ==
As a Jesuit, Clooney observes vows of poverty, chastity, and obedience. He regularly celebrates Mass at a local parish in Sharon, Massachusetts. Most of his free time is spent writing and presenting his work in academic circles domestically and abroad.

== Major publications ==
- Learning Interreligiously: In the Text, in the World (Fortress Press, 2018) ISBN 978-1506417714
- His Hiding Place Is Darkness: A Hindu-Catholic Theopoetics of Divine (Stanford, 2013)
- Comparative Theology: Deep Learning Across Religious Borders (Wiley-Blackwell, 2010)
- The Truth, the Way, the Life: Christian Commentary on the 1,531 Holy Mantras of the Srivaisnava Hindus (Wm. B. Eerdmans Publishing Company, 2009) ISBN 978-0-8028-6413-0
- Beyond Compare: St. Francis de Sales and Sri Vedanta Desika on Let’s Surrender to God (Washington, DC: Georgetown University Press, 2008) ISBN 978-1-58901-211-0
- Divine Mother, Blessed Mother: Hindu Goddesses and the Virgin Mary (New York: Oxford University Press, 2004) ISBN 978-0-19-517037-5
- Hindu God, Christian God: How Reason Helps Break Down the Boundaries between Religions (New York: Oxford University Press, 2001) ISBN 978-0-19-513854-2
- Hindu Wisdom for All God’s Children. (Orbis Books, 1998) ISBN 978-1-59752-068-3
- Seeing through Texts: Doing Theology among the Srivaisnavas of South India. (State University of New York, 1996) ISBN 978-0-7914-2996-9
- Theology after Vedanta: An Exercise in Comparative Theology. (State University of New York Press, 1993) ISBN 978-0-7914-1366-1

Clooney became a vegetarian in 1974 as part of his spiritual practice.
