= Hendrik Kraemer =

Dutch Reformed Church member (1888–1965)

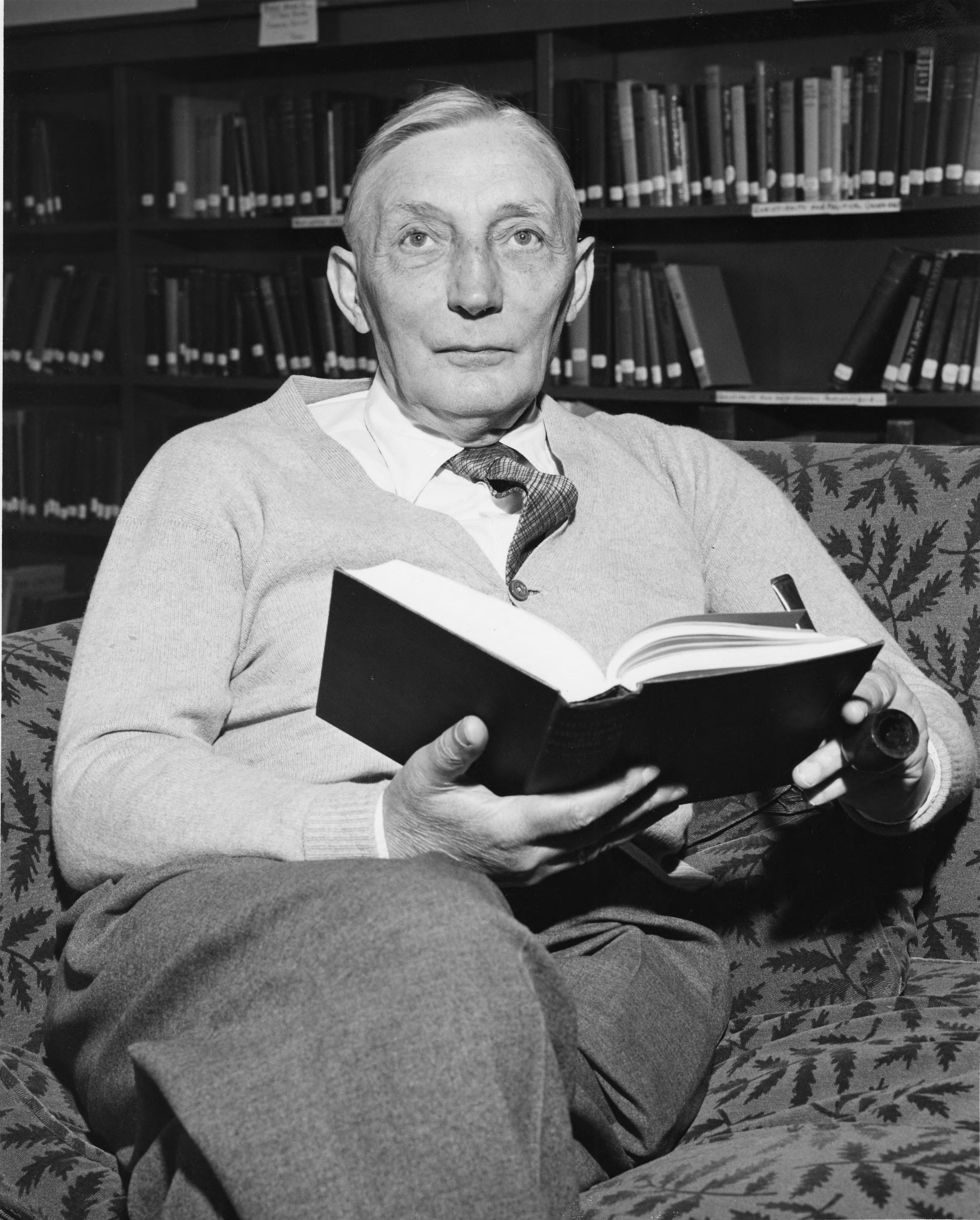
Hendrik Kraemer (ca. 1952)

Hendrik Kraemer (17 May 1888 – 11 November 1965) was a lay missiologist and figure in the ecumenical movement from Dutch Reformed Church in the Netherlands. He was a missionary of the Dutch Bible Society in the Netherlands Indies (1922—1937), chair of Comparative Religion at Leiden University (1937—1947) and the first director of the World Council of Churches' Ecumenical Institute in Bossey (1948—1955).

== Biography ==
Kraemer lost his parents at 12 years old, and stayed in an orphanage, where at the age of 16, he decided to become a missionary. Kraemer got married in 1919. He learned the Bible by himself, and he never entered theological seminary.

During his time in the Netherland Indies, he encouraged the Dutch to permit the spread of missionary activities outside of the Dutch East India Company-restricted area in eastern Indonesia to the rest of the archipelago.

Kraemer wrote The Christian Message in a Non-Christian World (1938) in preparation for the International Missionary Council at Tambaram (Madras) in 1938. Drawing on the theology of Karl Barth, Kraemer argued that there was a sharp contrast between "biblical realism" and non-Christian experiences—whether that be the secularism of the West or the non-Christian religions of the East. This led to his position in the theology of religions, whereby he supported an exclusivist understanding of religion.
