= Theology of religions =

The theology of religions is the branch of theology (mostly represented by Christian, Hindu, Islamic and Jewish theology) and religious studies that attempts to theologically evaluate the phenomena of religions. Three important schools within Christian theology of religions are pluralism, inclusivism, and exclusivism, which describe the relation of other religious traditions to Christianity and attempt to answer questions about the nature of God and salvation.

== Purpose of the theology of religions ==
The American theologian Langdon Brown Gilkey argued that the political situation of the West following World War II created a need for Christian thinkers to reconsider the place of other religions specifically because of the changing political world:

Colonies vanished, Europe disappeared as a major power, other non-western power centers appeared representing other ways of life and other religions. The West no longer ruled the world... Western religion became one among the other world religions.

== Basic three-point model ==
The most common model of the views that Christians take of other religions is a simple three-point model first articulated by Alan Race.

=== Pluralism ===
Pluralism is the belief that multiple religions are true and equally valid in communicating the truth about God, the world, and salvation. The chief expounder of this view is John Hick of Claremont Graduate School in California, who first propounded it in his book God and the Universe of Faiths (1973).

==== Criticism ====
John Hick's argument was notably criticized in the declaration Dominus Iesus by Cardinal Joseph Ratzinger.

To a pluralist such as Hick, Christianity is not the absolute, unique, and final way to God but one among several. While pluralists assert the validity of all religions, they also deny the finality of all religions. Hick challenges the older view that Jesus or Christianity must be seen at the center of religions and argues instead that God must be seen at the center of religions, a view also called theocentrism. The pluralistic contention is that although religions have different outward forms, all have the same source in the same god.

To an evangelical Christian, such pluralism only means the abolition of the kerygmatic mission (i.e., the mission of evangelizing the world to the Christian Gospel). Pluralism has been criticized as an invasive force that masquerades as Christianity while imperialistically demanding the surrender of Christian distinctiveness. Pluralists respond that Christian pluralism is not an invasive force at all but actually arises from tensions within the Christian tradition through a process of auto-deconstruction. Some have pointed out similarities between Hick's theocentrism and Hindu pluralism as propounded in the Bhagavad Gita:

By whatsoever way men worship Me, even so do I accept them; for, in all ways, O Partha, men walk in My path" (IV.11)

Another common evangelical criticism of pluralism is that the world's religions are fundamentally and irreconcilably different and that valuing them equally requires a devaluation of propositional truth claims. For this reason, pluralism is often treated as a form of self-defeating relativism, though pluralists generally do not accept this label. According to John Hick, "Religious pluralism is emphatically not a form of relativism." Hick considers himself a critical realist.

=== Inclusivism ===
Inclusivism is the belief that God is present in non-Christian religions, saving (i.e., bestowing eternal life) non-Christian adherents through Jesus (without them being Christians). The inclusivist view has given rise to the concept of the "anonymous Christian," an adherent of a non-Christian religion whom the Christian God nevertheless saves through Jesus. This position was popularized by the Roman Catholic theologian, Karl Rahner (1904–1984).

Christian inclusivism is based on two axioms: the first is that salvation is through Jesus alone, and the second is that God wills the whole world to be saved. Consequently, argue inclusivists, God saves people through Jesus alone; however, he makes this possible through ways that extend to all humanity.

To Rahner, a non-Christian religion is a lawful religion, for until its followers have received a Christian witness, it is a means by which non-Christians gain a right relationship with God. Also, religion is included in God’s plan of salvation, which God has ordained to communicate his grace. Inclusivism greatly appeals to people because of its sympathetic approach to religion.

=== Exclusivism ===
Exclusivism is the theological position that holds that there is no salvation in non-Christian religions. Notable among the exclusivists of the twentieth century are Samuel Zwemer, Hendrik Kraemer, and Lesslie Newbigin.

Citing the Aristotelian concept of truth as one and not many, exclusivists regard all religious claims other than Christianity as false and invalid. Exclusivists hold that salvation is through Jesus alone and that non-Christians cannot be saved because they neither recognize Jesus's uniqueness nor lordship.

Extremist exclusivism perceives all non-Christian religions as demonic and enemies of Christian truth. Moderate exclusivism sees some non-Christian religions as containing elements whereby a dialogue with them can be initiated.

Exclusivists argue that all claims to truth, including those made by pluralists and inclusivists, must exclude alternative claims. However, some exclusivists acknowledge that the Christian Bible also speaks of the Christian God as involved in the history of the nations. Thus, though being very vociferous in his attacks on Hinduism, Nehemiah Goreh could say that "Most erroneous as is the teaching of such books as the Bhagvadgita, the Bhagvata, etc., yet they teach something of ananyabhakti (undivided devotedness to God), of vairagya (giving up the world), of namrata (humility), of ksama (forbearance), etc., which enables one to appreciate the precepts of Christianity.’

Hendrik Kraemer's exclusivism is based on a skepticism towards claims of similarity between religions: "Every religion is an indivisible, and not to be divided." Religion "is not a series of tenets, institutions, practices that can be taken one by one as independent items of religious life."

== Knitter's four-point model ==
A significant expansion of the three-point model was proposed by Paul F. Knitter in his 2002 book Introducing Theologies of Religions. He outlined four possible views or models that one could adopt.

=== The replacement model ===
Knitter's "replacement model" corresponds to Exclusivism in the three-point model, but is split into two subsections: Total Replacement and Partial Replacement. The Total Replacement model is most frequently found in Fundamentalist/Evangelical churches, and largely represents the work of Karl Barth. It suggests that the reason the Christian religion is considered true is that it realizes that all religion is false (including itself), and recognizes that the only true belief can be found in Jesus. It does not necessarily say that there is nothing of value in other religions, but simply that there is no use in studying other religions, as everything of value can be found in Christ. The Partial Replacement model has similar things to say about other religions, but does not go so far as to say that there is nothing of value in other religions. It suggests that other religions might have access to God's revelation, but not to God's salvation. This is an important distinction, as it implies that some truth can be found in other religions, but not whole of the truth, and not enough to receive salvation. This view is largely based on the views expressed by the World Council of Churches in their discussion on religious dialogue and theology.

=== The fulfillment model ===
Knitter's main contribution, informed by his Christian faith and the idea that Christianity is a fulfillment of Judaism, implies that, while the previous religion was not wrong, it was incomplete and awaiting later fulfillment. This view is also held by some forms of Islam with respect to Christianity and Judaism before them, as well as by Mormonism and all other faiths who feel they have a later clarification from God.

However, one's religion does not have to be founded after others in order to see one's religion as a fulfillment. For instance, some Christian theologians argue that if their faith *arrives* later than the indigenous religion, even if in history Christianity came first, such indigenous systems were "God's placeholder," often with common truths learned from nature mixed with erroneous revelatory truths, that can be fulfilled and corrected with the revealed truth of the Christian Scriptures.

Proponents of this view include Karl Rahner, whose appreciation of the phrase "all grace is Christ's grace" led him to the controversial theory of "anonymous Christians" - those who are already saved by the light they have, yet have not yet heard the gospel.

=== The mutuality model ===
This model admits that an admixture of truth, error, and incompleteness of revelation exists in all religions, and we need one another to understand and find the truth. While this is a type of pluralism, it does not go so far as to admit that everyone is right, or that there is no objective truth - it only admits that we must learn from one another to find it. It may be that one or another faith is wrong on even major doctrines - but it is also right and has some value in contributing to the whole.

=== The acceptance model ===
This is Knitter's analog of pure pluralism. All paths may lead to God, and no one can affirm surely that their way is correct. We must all learn from one another, and pull back from making any absolute claims about spiritual matters. The acceptance model takes a subjective approach that admits that various viewpoints may work or not work for any given individual, and that is the measure of truth, and any claims beyond that are speculation.

== See also ==
- Divisions of the world in Islam
- Theocracy
- Philosophy of religion
- Nontheistic religion
- Religious naturalism
- Religion and happiness
- Religion and peacebuilding

== Bibliography ==
- Ames, Edward Scribner. The Psychology of Religious Experience, New York: Houghton Mifflin Company, 1910.
- Baillie, John. Our Knowledge of God, London: Oxford University Press, 1952.
- Bambrough, Renford. Reason, Truth and God, London: Methuen & Co. Ltd., 1969.
- Boyd, Robin. Indian Christian Theology, Delhi: ISPCK, 1975, rev. edn.
- Gnanakan, Ken. The Pluralistic Predicament, Bangalore: TBT, 1992.
- Kant, Immanuel. Religion Within the Limits of Reason Alone, tr. Theodore M. Greene & New York: Basic Books, Inc. Publishers, 1963.
- Otto, Rudolf. Mysticism East and West, trs. Bertha L. Bercey & Richena C. Payne, New York: The Macmillan Company, 1960.
- Singh, Narendra. A Christian Theology of Religions, Bangalore: SAIACS Press, 2005.
- Sumithra, Sunand. Christian Theologies from an Indian Perspective, Bangalore: Theological Book Trust, 1990.
- Tan, Loe-Joo. "The Catholic Theology of Religions: A Survey of Pre-Vatican II and Conciliar Attitudes Towards Other Religions." Scottish Journal of Theology 67, no. 03 (2014): 285-303.
