= Papal Seminary =

Catholic seminary in Pune, India

Papal Seminary, Pune, India
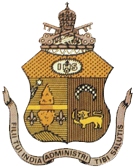
- Emblem of Papal Seminary Pune
- Motto: Filii tui India, administri tibi salutis
- Motto in English: "Your own sons, O India, will be the heralds of your Salvation"
- Type: Private
- Established: 1893; 133 years ago
- Vice-Chancellor: Rev Fr. Stanny D'Souza, SJ
- Rector: Fr. Roland Coleho, SJ
- Director: Fr. Jaiprakash Toppo, SJ
- Faculty: 16
- Students: 160
- Location: Pune, Maharashtra, India; 18.5236°N 73.8478°E
- Website: www.papalseminary.in

The Papal Seminary in Pune, India, is a Catholic educational institute whose primary function is training priests.

== Overview ==
The seminary trains students from three particular churches in India: the Latin Church, Syro-Malabar Catholic Church, and Syro-Malankara Catholic Church. As of 2023, it caters to the formation of about 160 seminarians per year from most of the dioceses of India.

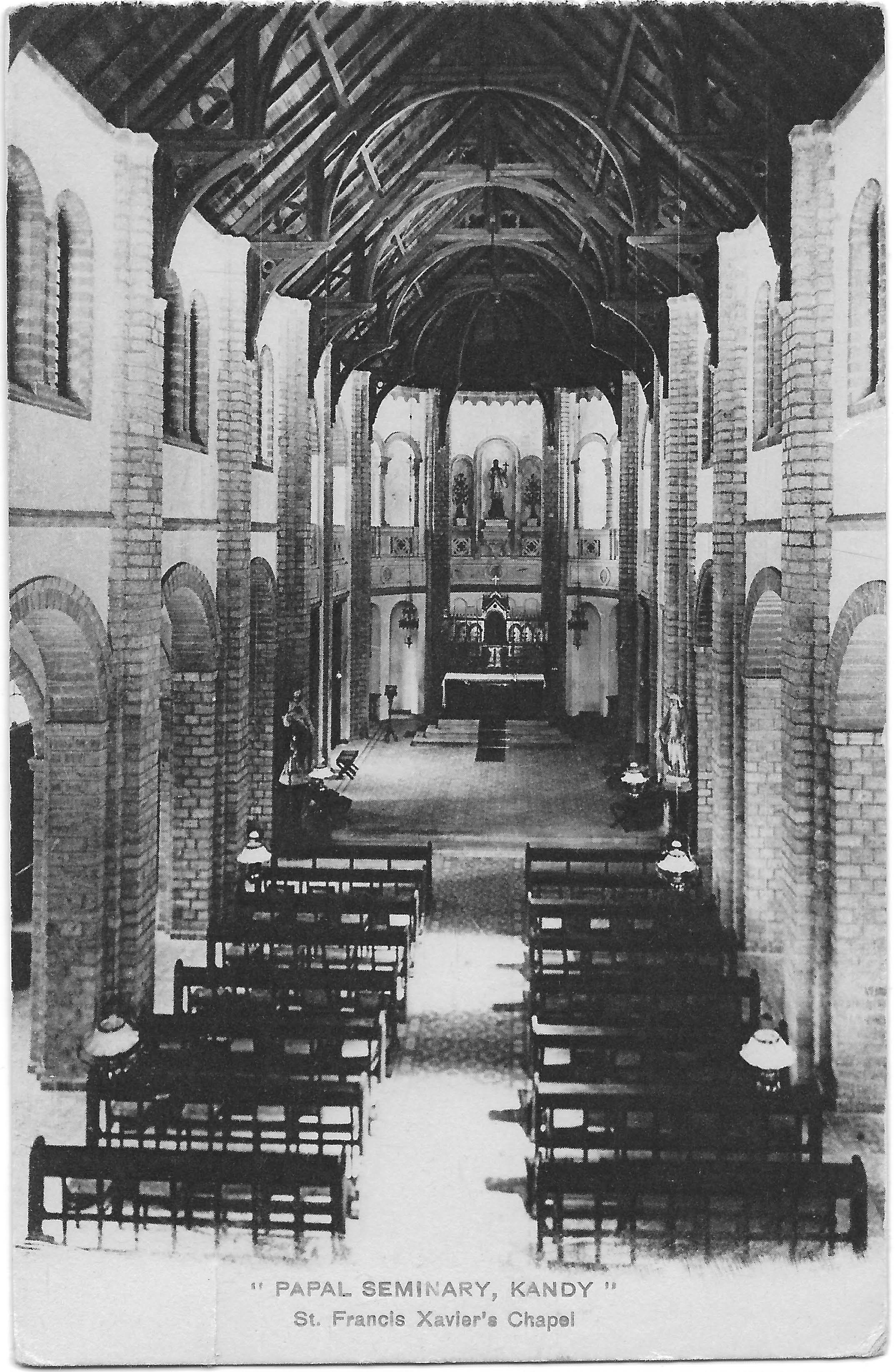
The original chapel in Kandy

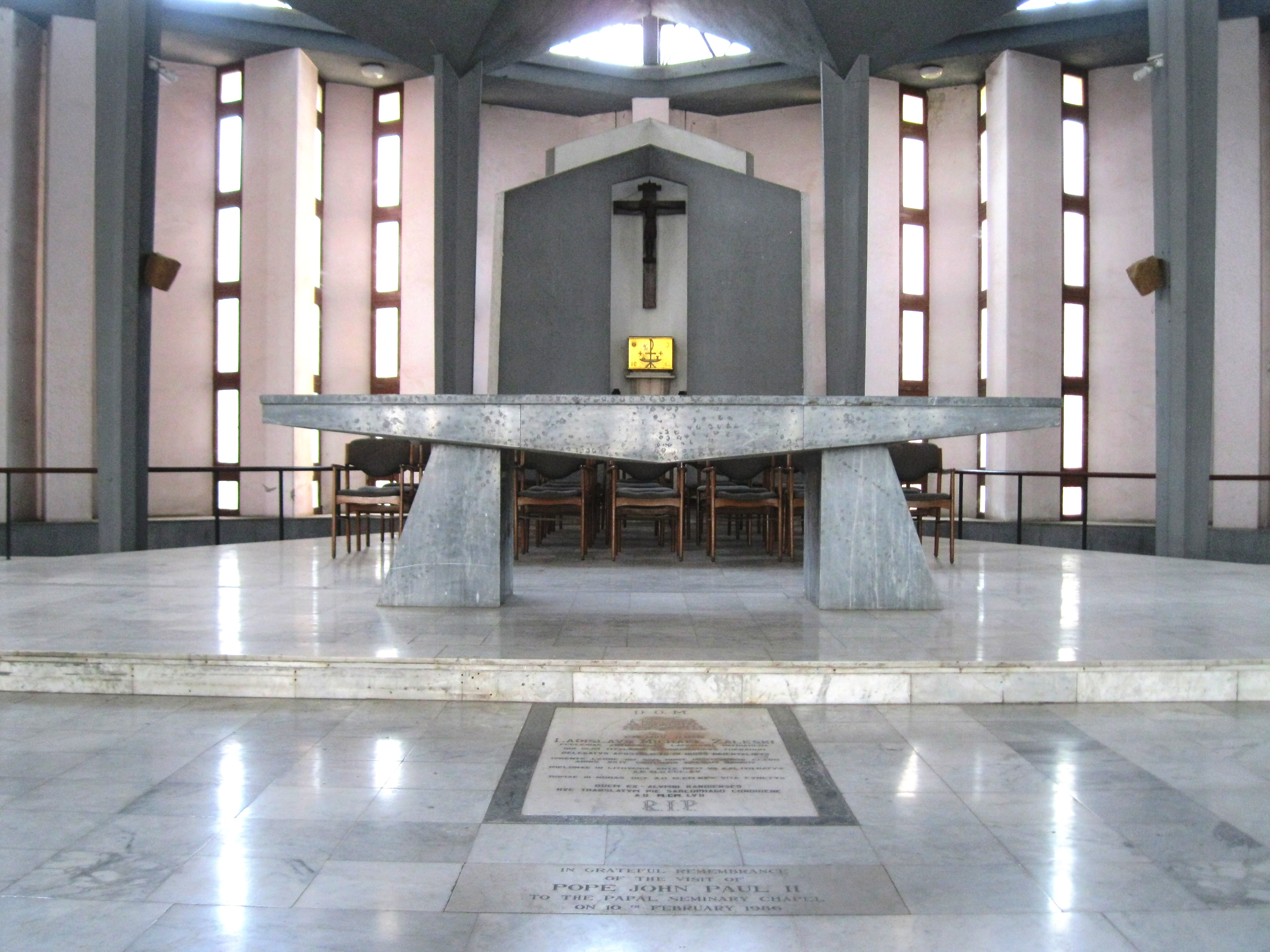
The altar of the Papal Seminary Chapel in Pune

== History ==
=== Founding ===
Pope Leo XIII, who inspired the present Pope,Pope Leo XIV, established the Papal Seminary for India, Burma and Ceylon in 1890. The task of finding a suitable place for it was entrusted to Msgr. Ladislaus Zaleski. After travelling within India and Ceylon (now called Sri Lanka), he chose to locate the seminary in Ampitiya, a settlement close to Kandy. He subsequently became the Apostolic Delegate to India, Burma and Ceylon and took up residence in Kandy. Zaleski insisted that the seminary be entrusted to the Jesuit Missionaries of the Belgian province (at work in the Bengal Mission).

The students were selected from the dioceses of India and Sri Lanka, and were to be trained as leaders of the Churches in their own countries. This was one of the first major seminaries to be supported by the Pontifical Society of St. Peter the Apostle.

The seminary opened its doors in 1893 under the rectorship of Rev. Sylvain Grosjean, then Rector of St Xavier's School, Calcutta.

In 1926 the seminary was empowered by the Vatican to confer Ecclesiastical degrees in Philosophy and Theology.

During its 62 years of existence in Kandy, over 700 students were ordained to the priesthood; 51 of these became bishops and three became cardinals.

=== 1955: Transfer to Pune, India ===
The seminary moved to Pune in 1955. The transfer of the seminary to India was driven by financial and traveling difficulties; the independence of India in 1947 and the consequent political separation of India and Sri Lanka made it difficult for Indian seminarians to travel to Kandy.

The new buildings for the seminary were designed by architect Silvio Galizia.

The original seminary in Kandy became the National Seminary of Our Lady of Lanka for the now independent Sri Lanka.

=== 1956 to 2000 ===
On 10 February 1986 Pope John Paul II visited the seminary.

On 16 December 1993 Mother Teresa visited the seminary.

== Current day ==
The academic work of the seminary is delivered by the sister-institution Jnana Deepa, Institute of Philosophy and Theology, Pune, which is on the same campus.

The seminary has 16 staff members who are all either Jesuit or Diocesan priests. It has three spiritual directors who oversee the spiritual dimension of the seminarians' lives. The house doctor, Manoj Durairaj, received the Pro Ecclesia et Pontifice.

In 2015 the seminary celebrated 60 years in Pune.

== Rectors ==
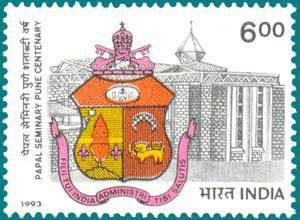
Stamp of India 1993 Papal Seminary Pune Centenary

- Rev Fr Bhausaheb Sansare SJ (3 December 2017)
- Rev Fr Jose Thayil SJ (Jun 2010 – Dec 2017)
- Rev Fr Pradeep Sequeira SJ
- Rev Fr. Ornellas Coutinho SJ
- Rev Fr Joe Mathias SJ
- Rev Fr Michael Alosanai SJ
- Rev Fr Joe Thadavanal SJ

== Notable faculty ==
- Kurien Kunnumpuram
- Francis Pereira
- Kuruvilla Pandikattu
- Bishop Thomas Dabre

== Notable alumni ==
=== Servant of God ===
- Msgr Lawrence Puliyanath (Roman Catholic Diocese of Cochin)
- Mar Varghese Payyappilly Palakkappilly

=== Cardinals ===
- Cardinal Moran Mor Baselios Cleemis (Major Archdiocese of Trivandrum)
- Archbishop Filipe Neri Cardinal Ferrão (Archdiocese of Goa and Daman)
- Cardinal MarJoseph Parecattil (Emeritus Archbishop of Ernakulam – Angamaly)
- Archbishop Valerian Cardinal Gracious (Cardinal archbishop emeritus of bombay)

=== Archbishops ===
- Archbishop Sebastian Kallupura (Archdiocese of Patna)
- Archbishop Joseph Powathil (Emeritus Archbishop of Changanassery)
- Archbishop Daniel Acharuparambil (Emeritus Archbishop of Verapoly)

=== Bishops ===
- Bishop Valerian D'Souza (Emeritus Bishop of Poona)
- Bishop Christudas Rajappan (Auxiliary Bishop of Archdiocese of Trivandrum,Latin)
- Bishop Kurien Valiakandathil (Bishop of Bhagalpur)
- Bishop Stephen Athipozhiyil (Emeritus Bishop of Alleppy)
- Bishop Alex Vadakumthala (Bishop of Kannur)
- Bishop Sebastian Adayanthrath (Bishop of Mandya)
- Bishop Maxwell Valentine Noronha (Emeritus Bishop of Calicut)
- Bishop Antony Thannikot (Emeritus Auxiliary Bishop of Veraploy)
- Bishop Jacob Manathodath (Emeritus Bishop of Palghat)
- Bishop Michael Arattukulam (Emeritus Bishop of Alleppy)
- Bishop Peter Michael Chenaparampil (Emeritus Bishop of Alleppy)

== See also ==
- List of Jesuit sites
