= Job Kozhamthadam =

Indian Catholic priest and historian

Reverend Job Kozhamthadam SJ

Education
- Education: University of Maryland

Philosophical work
- Region: Indian philosophy
- School: Science–religion dialogue; history and philosophy of science
- Institutions: Jnana Deepa; Indian Institute of Science and Religion (IISR)
- Main interests: History and philosophy of science; relationship between science and religion; cosmology; ethics of technology
- Notable works: The Discovery of Kepler's Laws; Science, Technology and Values; East–West Interface of Reality; Science, Mysticism and East–West Dialogue

Job Kozhamthadam SJ is an Indian Jesuit priest, historian and philosopher of science, widely regarded as a pioneer of the science–religion dialogue in India. He has taught at Jnana-Deepa Vidyapeeth (JDV), Pune, served as its president, and is founder–president of the Indian Institute of Science and Religion (IISR), Delhi.

== Early life and education ==
Kozhamthadam completed a B.Sc. (Honours) in Physics at Ranchi University, earning the Deen Tarini Gold Medal for securing the highest marks in 1969. He subsequently obtained an M.Sc. in physics from Patna University (1972), a B.Ph. from Jnana-Deepa Vidyapeeth (1975), a B.Th. from Vidyajyoti, Delhi (1978), an M.A. in History and Philosophy of Science from the University of Notre Dame (1980), and a Ph.D. in History and Philosophy of Science from the University of Maryland (1986).

== Academic career ==
From 1986 onwards Kozhamthadam taught Philosophy of Science, Cosmology, Hume, and Science and Religion at Jnana Deepa, Institute of Philosophy and Theology in Pune, where he also served as department chair and dean of philosophy. He was visiting professor of Philosophy of Science at Loyola University Chicago in 1989, 1990, 1992 and 1994.

Kozhamthadam founded the Association of Science, Society and Religion (ASSR) and later the Indian Institute of Science and Religion (IISR), serving as its first president and director. IISR organises seminars on topics such as artificial intelligence and robotics in relation to ethics and religion. A Templeton Foundation project lists him as co-leader of a master's programme in science and religion in India.

He has been a member of the Indian National Commission for the History of Science (Indian National Science Academy), the New York Academy of Sciences, the British Society for the Philosophy of Science, and the International Society for Science and Religion, Cambridge.

== Thought and contributions ==
Kozhamthadam is widely described as "the pioneer of science–religion dialogue in India". His historical reconstruction of Kepler's work highlights how empirical, philosophical, and religious elements interact in scientific discovery. The book received positive academic reviews including in The British Journal for the Philosophy of Science.

His public writing and interviews stress "constructive collaboration" between science and religion as mutually enriching ways of interpreting reality.

His later works explore complementarity between scientific cosmology, Eastern religious intuition, and mystical experience, arguing that both science and spirituality point to a deeply interconnected universe.

== Selected works ==
=== Monographs ===
- The Discovery of Kepler's Laws: The Interaction of Science, Philosophy, and Religion. University of Notre Dame Press, 1994.
- East–West Interface of Reality: A Scientific and Intuitive Inquiry into the Nature of Reality. ASSR / IAISS, 2003/2005.
- Science, Mysticism and East–West Dialogue. ISPCK / IISR, 2016.

=== Edited volumes ===
- Interrelations and Interpretation: Philosophical Reflections on Science, Religion and Hermeneutics in Honour of Richard De Smet, S.J. and Jean de Marneffe, S.J. Intercultural Publications, 1997.
- Science, Technology and Values: Science–Religion Dialogue in a Multi-Religious World. ASSR Publications, 2003.
- The Human Soul in a World of Neurological Sciences. ISPCK / IISR, 2021.
- Artificial Intelligence and the Future of Humanity. ISPCK / IISR, 2024.

=== Articles ===
- "Modern Science and Eastern Intuition: Coexistence or Complementarity?" Disputatio Philosophica 3 (2001): 111–122.
- "Modern Science in India and the Emergence of a New Worldview" in New Perspectives in Indian Science and Civilization (Routledge, 2019).

== See also ==
- Science and religion
- Kuruvilla Pandikattu
- Richard De Smet
