= Teape Lectures =

The Teape Lectures were established at Cambridge University in 1955. They form the major activity of the Teape Trust (Charity No 250095), created from an endowment made posthumously by William Marshall Teape (St John's College, Cambridge 1882, died 1945). The object of the trust is 'The advancement of education by the provision of lectures on the relationship between Christian and Hindu thought and subject thereto the study of Christian and Hindu religious thought and the promotion of Christian-Hindu relations'.

The lectures are among the most prestigious engagements for Christian-Hindu relations, as evidenced from the list of major speakers who have held the appointments, and from the internationally significant publications that have emerged from many of the lecture series.

The lectures are typically delivered in Cambridge by a speaker from India or in India by a speaker with a Cambridge connection. They reflect a close association between Westcott House, Cambridge and St. Stephen's College, Delhi.

Lecturers:

In India (generally in Delhi, Bangalore, Kolkata):

1955 Charles Raven (Regius Professor of Divinity Emeritus, Cambridge) 'Religion, Science and Technology'
1958 Owen Chadwick (Master of Selwyn College, Cambridge) 'The Experience of Religion'
1962 Robert Runcie (Principal of Cuddesdon College) 'Christianity and Culture'
1964 Ninian Smart (H. G. Wood Professor of Theology, Birmingham)'The Upahishads and Christian Theology', pub. as The Yogi and The Devotee (Allen & Unwin 1968)
1967 Leonard Schiff 'Secularisation in East and West'
1969 Robert Charles Zaehner (Spalding Professor of Eastern Religions and Ethics, Oxford) 'Sri Aurobindo and Teihard de Chardin', pub. as Evolution in Religion (OUP 1971)
1972 Stephen Neill (Professor of Philosophy and Religious Studies, Nairobi) 'Tamil Classics and Christianity', pub. as Bhakti, Hindu and Christian (Christian Literature Society 1974)
1973 Geoffrey Parrinder (Professor in the Comparative Study of Religions, King's College London) 'Mysticism in Hindu and Christian Thought', pub. as Mysticism in the World's Religions (Oneworld Publications, New ed. 1995)
1975 John Hick (H. G. Wood Professor of Theology, Birmingham) 'The Hindu Idea of Reincarncation and Christian Eschatology', pub. as part of Death and Eternal Life (Collins 1976)
1978 JAT Robinson (Dean of Chapel, Trinity College, Cambridge) pub. as Truth is Two-Eyed (SCM 1979)
1979 Judith Brown (University of Manchester) 'Religious Experience of the Twentieth Century Hindus and Christians', pub. as Men and Gods in a Changing World (SCM 1980)
1981 Julius Lipner (University Lecturer, Cambridge) 'The Life and Thought of the Hindu-Catholic Nationalist, Brahamabandhab Upadhyay (1861–1907), pub. as Brahmabandhab Upadhyay: The Life and Thought of a Revolutionary (OUP India 2001)
1983 Brian Hebblethwaite (Lecturer in Philosophy of Religion, Cambridge) 'The Overcoming of Evil', pub. as part of Evil, Suffering and Religion (SPCK, rev. ed. 2001)
1986 Ursula King (Senior Lecturer, Leeds) 'Women and Spirituality, some Hindu, Christian and Secular Reflections', pub. as part of Women and Spirituality, Voices of Protest and Promise (Palgrave Macmillan, 2nd ed 1993)
1989 Keith Ward (Professor of Philosophy of Religion, University of London) 'Theism European and Indian: Conflict or Convergence'
1990 Dermot Killingley 'Rammohun Roy in Hindu and Christian Tradition'
1992 Daniel O’Connor 'Relations in Religion'
1994 Nicholas Lash (Norris-Hulse Professor of Divinity, Cambridge) 'The Upanishads of the Catholic Church' pub. as part of The Beginning and the End of 'Religion' (Cambridge: CUP, 1996)
1996 Roger Hooker 'Narrating Our Nations'
1998 Michael Barnes 'The Dialogue between Theology and Post-Modernity', pub. as Walking The City - Christian Discipleship in a Pluralist World (ISPCK 1999)
2000 Eric Lott (United Theological College, Bangalore) 'Religious Faith, Human Identity –Dangerous Dynamics in Global and Indian Life', pub. same title (Asian Trading Company, 2005)
2002 Martin Forward 'The Divine in Human Form in India', pub. as The Nature and the Name of Love: Religion for the Contemporary World (Epworth Press, 2008)
2004 Ian Markham 'Dialogue Done Differently'
2006 Douglas Hedley (Reader in Hermeneutics and Metaphysics, Cambridge) 'The One and the Many'
2009 David Gosling 'Darwin, Science and the Indian Tradition – Commemorating Darwin's Bicentenary', pub. as
2011 Andrew Wingate 'Encounter between Hindus and Christians in Britain'
2015 Francis X Clooney, SJ (Parkman Professor of Divinity, Harvard University), "The Future of Hindu-Christian Studies: Rebuilding the Intellectual-Spiritual Foundations"

In Cambridge:

1957 Paul David Devanandan 'The Gita and the Gospel'
1963 F Mulayil 'Karma and Salvation'
1966 Raimundo Panikkar 'Five Great Utterances of the Upanishads', pub. as The Vedic Experience (Darton, Longman and Todd, 1979)
1968 E Sambaya 'The Upanishads and Christian Thought'
1970 Paul Sudhakar 'The Gita and the New Testament'
1973 Nalini Devadas 'Ananda, the Concept of Bliss in the Upanishads'
1974 S.J. Samarha 'Studies in Hindu-Christian Dialogue'
1976 JDM Stuart 'Swami Abhishitananda, a Study in Christian-Hindu Understanding'
1978 Anima Bose 'Christian Thought and the Gandhian Way'
1980 Samuel Rayan 'A Relentless Quest: Three Upanishad Myths in Relation to Christian Themes'
1982 Aloysius Peiris 'The Buddhist World View and the Christian Kerygma'
1983 Margaret Chatterjee 'The Concept of Spirituality'
1989 Sara Grant (Society of the Sacred Heart), published as Towards an alternative theology: Confessions of a non-dualist Christian (Asian Trading Company, 1991)
1995 Jyoti Sahi 'The Art Ashram'
1998 Eric Lott (United Theological College, Bangalore) 'Set Free by a Dancing God'
1999 Mark Tully 'The East-West Person'
2001 Christel Devadawson 'Travelling through Britain: India's Road to Post-Colonialism', pub. as part of Reading India, Writing English (Macmillan India, 2005)
2003 Roger Gaikwad 'The Interplay of Religion, Politics and Communalism in India'
2005 K P Aleaz 'For a Christian Philosophy from India'
2017 Renish Geevarghese Abraham (St. Stephen's College, Delhi) 'Negotiating Hinduism and Christianity in the History of Kerala'
