= ACPI (disambiguation) =

ACPI (Advanced Configuration and Power Interface) is a computer firmware standard.

ACPI may also refer to:

- Animation Council of the Philippines, Inc.
- Association of Christian Philosophers of India
- America's Cup Properties Inc, in International C-Class Catamaran Championship
