= Rahne =

Rahne is both a surname and a given name. Notable people with the name include:

- Ricky Rahne (born 1980), American football player and coach
- Rahne Jones (born 1987), American actress

== See also ==
- Rahner
