= George Panthanmackel =

- Born: 19 January 1959 (age 66)
- Education: Doctor of Western Philosophy (Innsbruck, Austria), Doctor of Indian Philosophy (Bangalore, India), Doctor of Theology (Bangalore, India)
- Organizations: Suvidya College, India
- Website: www.suvidya.org

George Panthanmackel (born 19 January 1959) is professor of philosophy at Suvidya College, Bangalore. He has also been a visiting professor to several other Institutes teaching both graduates and postgraduates.

== Biography ==
In 2009–2010 he worked at Indira Gandhi National Open University (IGNOU) as senior consultant of philosophy and organized its BA Philosophy Syllabus, especially by editing the entire 238 Units (Chapters). He has published about 70 research papers and articles in national and international Journals. He has learned 11 languages and one dialect: Greek, Latin, Hebrew, German, English, French, Hindi, Telugu, Tamil, Malayalam, Kannada, Lotha (dialect).

He was dean of Suvidya College from 1993 to 1996, and registrar of the same college from 2004 to 2009. He had been the president of the Association of Christian Philosophers of India (ACPI) from 2006 to 2012. He became a member of the same association in 1992 and was on its executive committee from 1994 to 2002, and as its secretary from 2002 to 2006. He is currently an editor, appointed by the MSFS Superior General, of the History of the Missionaries of St Francis de Sales.

He has been the chief editor of the Fransalian International since 2004. He is also on the editorial boards of Indian Journal of Spirituality, Suvidya Journal of Philosophy and Religion, and the Associate Editor of the ACPI Encyclopedia of Philosophy, 2010. He has presented Papers at national and international conferences, some of which he has organized.

== Professional experience ==
He has been a teacher for 24 years. He has taught several subjects: metaphysics, epistemology, philosophy of religion, philosophical anthropology, methodology, sociology, public administration, political science, history of Western philosophy, contemporary Indian philosophy, Marxism, Trinity, and English literature.

He holds three doctorates: Doctor of Philosophy, Western (Innsbruck, Austria), Doctor of Philosophy, Indian (Bangalore, India), and Doctor of Theology (Bangalore, India). He has authored nine books.

== Bibliography ==
=== Books ===
- Nature of Jesus Christ According to Karl Rahner.
- One in Many: An Investigation into The Metaphysical Vision of Karl Rahner.
- Coming and Going: An Introduction to Metaphysics from Western Perspectives.
- A Form in Forms: The Form of Postmodernism.
- In Struggle and Dialogue With: A Concise History of Western Medieval and Renaissance Philosophy.
- Society in Being: Metaphysical Foundation of Sociology.
- The Constitution of India: A Philosophical Review (editor).
- God of Love: An Investigation into Transcendent Love in the Spirituality of St Francis de Sales
- Authentic Existence: A Philosophical Probe (editor)
- : Makers of a mission history, The Missionary Movement of the Missionaries of St.Francis de Sales ( Fransalians)
- :ACPI Encyclopedia I & II Volumes Chief Editor
