= National Seminary of Our Lady of Lanka =

Roman Catholic Seminary in Sri Lanka

- Sinhala: ලංකා අප ස්වාමිදුවගේ ජාතික සෙමනේරිය
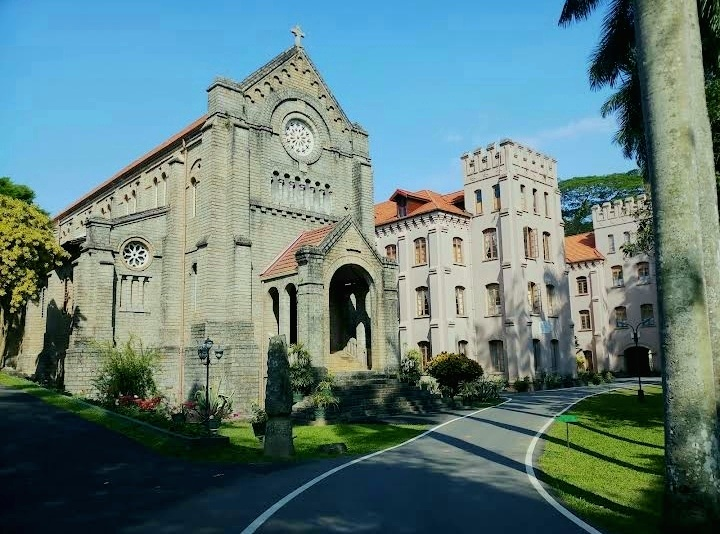
- Old chapel and new buildings at the National Seminary
- Motto: Latin: Parare Plebem Perfectam
- Motto in English: To prepare perfect people
- Type: Roman Catholic Seminary
- Established: 1955; 71 years ago
- Affiliations: Christianity
- Religious affiliation: Roman catholic
- Academic affiliations: Philosophy; Theology
- Chairman: Most Rev Dr Valence Mendis
- Rector: Very Rev. Fr. Quintus Fernando
- Director: Rev. Fr. Tharanga Hemal Kumaraperu
- Students: 280
- Location: Kandy, Central Province, Sri Lanka; 7.28217°N 80.65508°E
- Language: English; Sinhala; Latin

National Seminary of Our Lady of Lanka (Sinhala: ලංකා අප ස්වාමිදුවගේ ජාතික සෙමනේරිය Lanka Api Swamiduvage Jathika Semaneriya) is a Roman Catholic Seminary situated in Ampitiya, Kandy, Sri Lanka. It was established in 1955 from the Papal Seminary buildings after the Papal Seminary was transferred from Kandy to Pune, India. Many priests, even from the Archdiocese of Colombo, serve here.

The National Seminary was entrusted to the Oblates of Mary Immaculate who were already instructing priests at St. Bernard's Seminary, Colombo. The first academic year of the National Seminary of Our Lady of Lanka commenced on 10 September 1955.

== History ==
In 1890, as per the request of Pope Leo XIII, Monsignor Ladislaus Zaleski started exploring the possibility of a Papal Seminary for India, Burma and Ceylon. Zaleski took up residence in Kandy, and chose an upland known as Ampitiya, that overlooks the Dumbara Valley. The Papal Seminary was established in 1893. It was one of the first major seminaries to be supported by the Pontifical Society of St. Peter the Apostle.

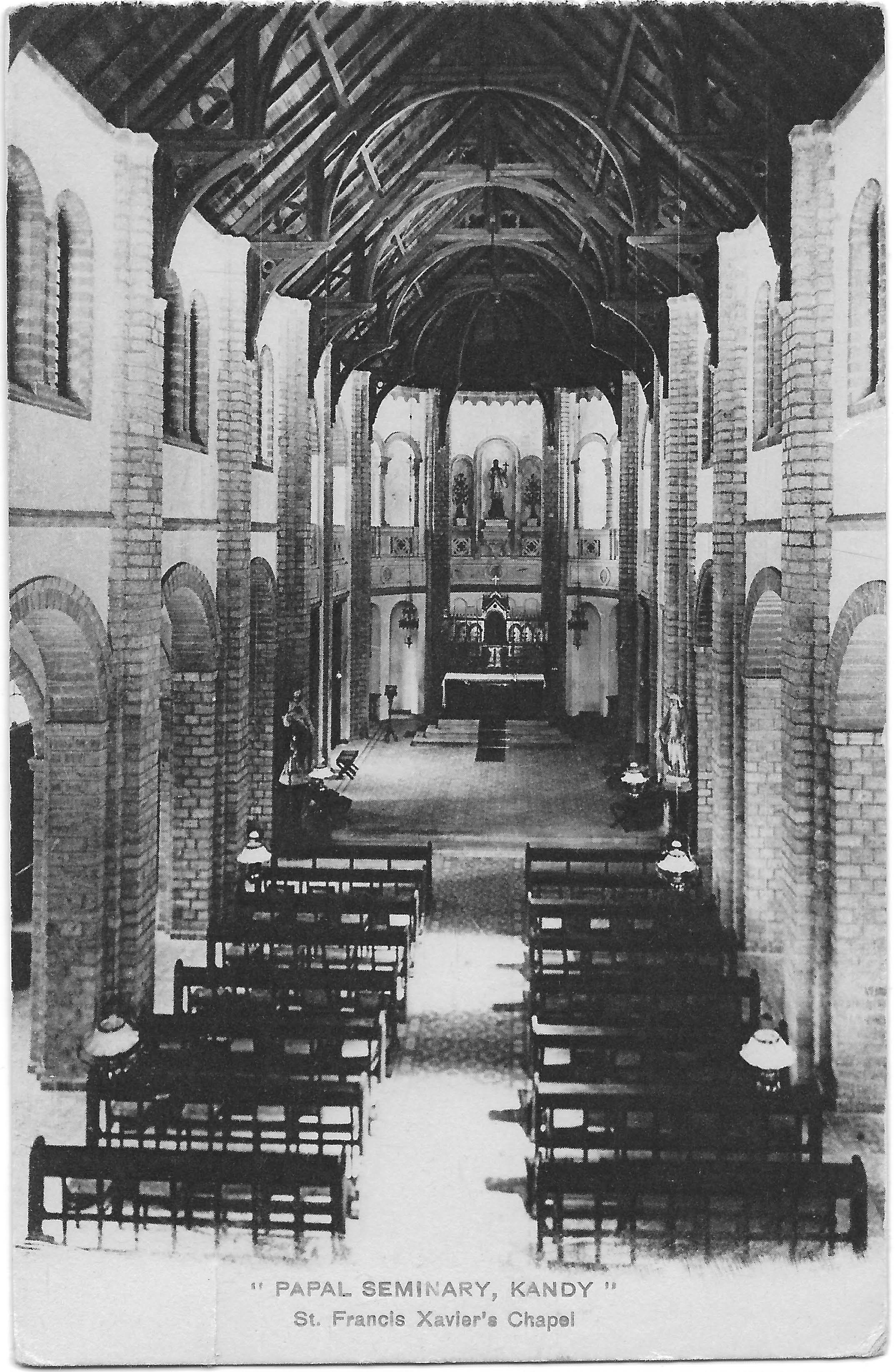
St. Xavier's Capel, Papal Seminary, Ceylon

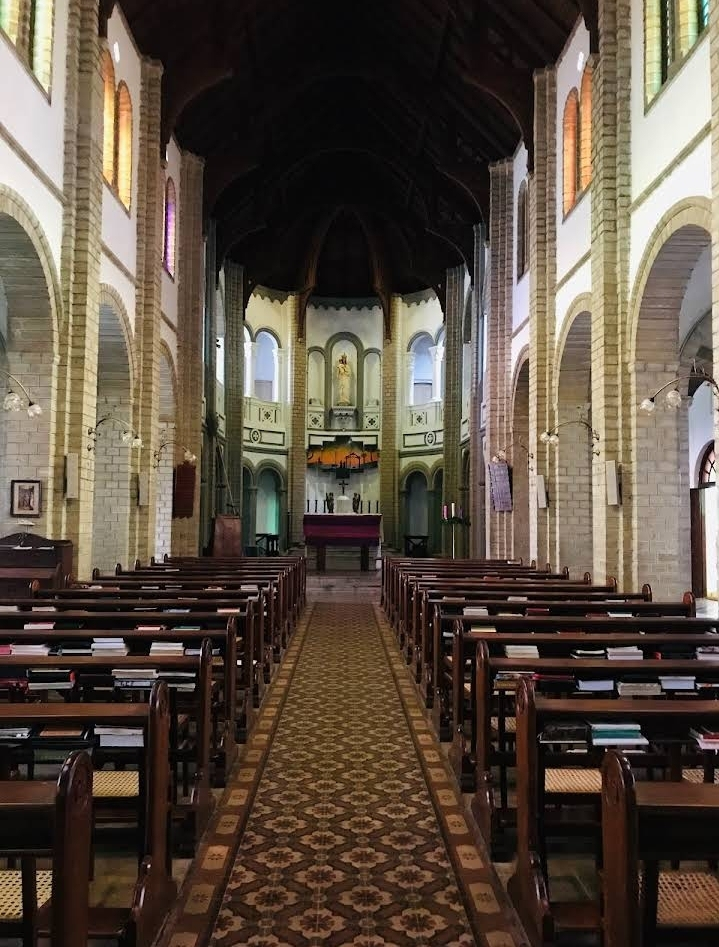
St. Xavier's Chapel in the National Seminary 2022

After the Papal Seminary was moved to Pune, India, the former buildings became the home to the National Seminary of Our Lady of Lanka in 1955. The administration was entrusted to the Oblates of Mary Immaculate who were already instructing priests at St. Bernard's Seminary, Colombo. The first academic year of the National Seminary of Our Lady of Lanka commenced on 10 September 1955.

== Teaching ==
One of the former instructors is the Bishop of Alaminos Napoleon Siplay, who taught at the National Seminary between 2006 and 2015.

From 1955 to 1971, Fr. Michael Rodrigo served as a lecturer of theological studies at the National Seminary.
