= Divyadaan: Journal of Philosophy and Education =

- Language: English

Publication details
- Former names: Divyadaan: A Philosophical Annual; Divyadaan: Journal of Philosophy
- History: 1984–present
- Publisher: Divyadaan: Salesian Institute of Philosophy (India)
- Frequency: Triannually

Standard abbreviations
- ISO 4: Divyadaan

Indexing
- ISSN: 0972-2211

Divyadaan: Journal of Philosophy and Education is published three times a year by Divyadaan: Salesian Institute of Philosophy, Nashik, India. It focuses mainly on philosophy, with interest also in the streams of education and communication, which are the two specializations offered by the Institute. The Institute is run by the Society of St Francis de Sales, also known as the Salesians of Don Bosco, an international Catholic religious congregation whose primary mission is the education of young people, especially those who are disadvantaged. The congregation also interests itself in the welfare of middle- and working-class people, hence its interest in popular communication.

== Earlier names ==
Originally entitled Divyadaan: A Philosophical Annual, in 1995 it was renamed Divyadaan: Journal of Philosophy, and in 1996 Divyadaan: Journal of Philosophy and Education. Articles are indexed in The Philosopher's Index.

== Features ==
Besides articles, the journal offers 'Dissertation Abstracts' (of doctoral dissertations in philosophy, education and communication published in the South Asia region) and 'Reviews and Notices'.

In 2009 (vol. 20/2) the journal began serializing Richard De Smet's 'Guidelines in Indian Philosophy', which up to then had existed only in the form of cyclostyled notes for students at Jnana Deepa Vidyapeeth, Pune.

== Editors ==
Joaquim D'Souza edited the journal from 1984-85 to 1987-88 (vols. 1-3); Albano Fernandes from 1993 to 1998 (vols. 5-9); Ivo Coelho in 1988-89 (vol. 4), and then again since 1999 (vol. 10). Since 2014 (vol. 25) Banzelao Julio Teixeira has joined as co-editor.
