= Areekara =

- village
- Location in Kerala, India
- Coordinates: 9°49′0″N 76°35′0″E
- Country: India
- State: Kerala
- District: Kottayam

Languages
  - Official: Malayalam, English
- Time zone: UTC+5:30 (IST)
- PIN: 686641
- Vehicle registration: KL-67
- Nearest city: Koothattukulam, Pala.
- Lok Sabha constituency Kaduthuruthy.: Kottayam

Areekara is a small agricultural village North of Kottayam District, Kerala, India. It is connected by Road to Veliyannoor, Puthuvely, Uzhavoor and Ramapuram. There is an Upper Primary School, St. Rockey's, Catholic Church and Hindu Temple. The village is primarily agricultural with no business or industrial locations. Many people from Areekara live in Gulf and Western countries and that is one of the major source of income of the village. All Kerala Tug of War competition conducted by Areekara Club is one of the famous events which takes place every year in Areekara.

Aerial view of Areekara:

The philosopher Kuruvilla Pandikattu was born in this village.
