= George Soares-Prabhu =

Indian Jesuit priest (1929–1995)

The Reverend Father George M. Soares-Prabhu, SJ Ayyagaru
- Born: November 17, 1929; Igatpuri (Maharashtra)
- Died: July 22, 1995 (aged 65); Poona (Maharashtra)
- Education: B. Sc. (Bombay); B. Th. (JDV); L. S. S. (PIB); Ph. D. (Lyon)
- Alma mater: St. Xavier's College, Mumbai, Bombay (Maharashtra); Jnana Deepa, Institute of Philosophy and Theology, Poona (Maharashtra); Pontifical Biblical Institute, Rome (Italy); University of Lyon, Lyon (France)
- Occupation: Priest-Teacher
- Years active: 1970-1995 (25 years)
- Known for: Biblical Exegesis
- Religion: Christianity
- Church: Society of Jesus
- Ordained: 24 March 1961
- Offices held: Teacher
- Title: The Reverend Father

George Soares-Prabhu (17 November 1929 – 22 July 1995) was an Indian Jesuit priest, exegete and biblical scholar, particularly known for his work in Indian Hermeneutics of the Christian Scriptures.

== Biography ==
Soares-Prabhu completed his Senior Cambridge at Jabalpur (Madhya Pradesh) in 1944 and then B. Sc. (Chemistry-Botany) at St. Xavier’s College, Bombay in 1949. Afterwards he joined the Society of Jesus and was ordained a priest on 24 March 1961 at De Nobili College, Pune.

He joined the Faculty of Theology at Pontifical Athenaeum (now known as Jnana Deepa, Institute of Philosophy and Theology), Pune. He went to the Pontifical Biblical Institute, Rome, to secure a licentiate in Scriptures and completed a PhD in Biblical theology in Lyon, France. He wrote his thesis An Enquiry into the Tradition History of Matthew 1-2 under the guidance of Xavier Léon-Dufour.

Soares-Prabhu returned to Pune in June 1969 and began teaching in 1970. Among various courses he taught, 'The Historical Jesus', 'Resurrection of Jesus and Dharma of Jesus' were most appreciated. Along with his colleagues, Francis X D'sa, Rui de Menezes and Kurien Kunnumpuram, he tried to articulate an Indian Christian theology. He was an ardent advocate of a Liberation Theology adapted to the Indian ethos and socio-religious context. He visualised a Church that is unprejudiced, all-embracing and all-inclusive.

He died in a road accident in Pune on 22 July 1995.

A collection of his works have been published in four volumes by Jnana Deepa, Institute of Philosophy and Theology, in Pune, India.

A festschrift was prepared in his honour, entitled The Dharma of Jesus.

== Writings ==
- The Formula Quotations in the Infancy Narrative of Matthew: An Enquiry into the Tradition History of Matthew 1-2 (Analecta Biblica, 63), Rome: Biblical Institute, 1976.
- Biblical Themes for a Contextual Theology Today (edited with an Introduction by Isaac Padinjarekuttu), Pune: Jnana Deepa, Institute of Philosophy and Religion, 1999.
- A Biblical Theology for India (edited with an Introduction by Scaria Kuthirakkattel, SVD), Pune: Jnana Deepa, Institute of Philosophy and Religion, 1999.
- Biblical Spirituality of Liberative Action (edited with an Introduction by Scaria Kuthirakkattel, SVD), Pune: Jnana Deepa, Institute of Philosophy and Religion, 2003.
- Theology of Liberation: An Indian Biblical Perspective (edited with an Introduction by Francis X. D’Sa, S. J.), Pune: Jnana Deepa, Institute of Philosophy and Religion, 2001.

The four Collected Works are as follows:

- CWG 1: Soares-Prabhu, George M. (1999). Biblical Themes for a Contextual Theology Today, Collected Writings of George M. Soares-Prabhu, S.J., Vol.1.Padinjarekuttu, Isaac (ed.) Pune: Jnana-Deepa Vidyapeeth Theology Series.
- CWG 2: Soares-Prabhu, George M. (1999). Biblical Theology for India, Collected Writings of George M. Soares-Prabhu, S.J., Vol.2, Kuthirakkattel, Scaria (ed.), Pune: Jnana-Deepa Vidyapeeth Theology Series.
- CWG 3: Soares-Prabhu, George M. (2003). Biblical Spirituality of Liberative Action, Collected Writings of George M. Soares-Prabhu, S.J., Vol.3. Kuthirakkattel, Scaria. (ed.), Pune: Jnana-Deepa Vidyapeeth Theology Series.
- CWG 4: Soares-Prabhu, George M. (2001). Theology of Liberation: An Indian Biblical Perspective, Collected Writings of George M. Soares-Prabhu, S.J., *Vol.4. D’Sa, Francis X. (ed.). Pune. Jnana-Deepa Vidyapeeth Theology Series.
