= Francis Pereira =

Indian Jesuit priest, scripture scholar and writer (1931-2014)

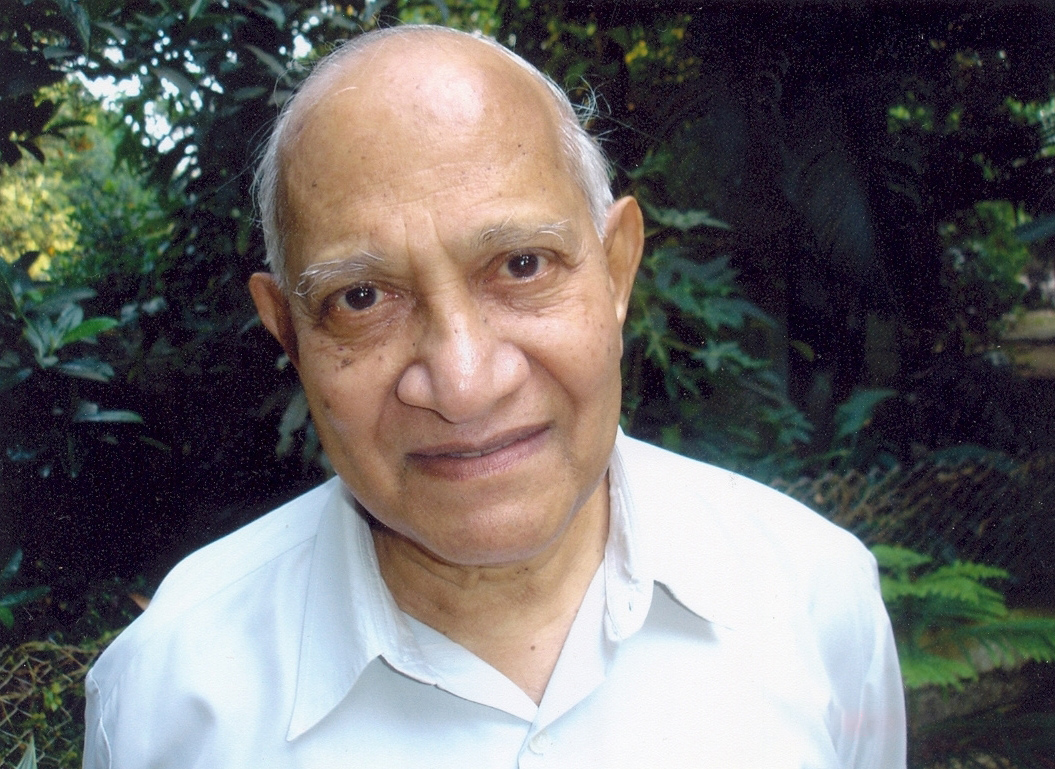
- Rev. Fr. Francis Pereira SJ
- Born: 4 December 1931; Vadawali, Palli, Vasai
- Died: 10 May 2014 (aged 82); Vinayalaya, Andheri, Mumbai

Rev Francis Pereira S.J. (4 December 1931 - 10 May 2014) was an Indian Jesuit priest, scripture scholar and Marathi writer. He is professor emeritus of Jnana Deepa, Institute of Philosophy and Theology, Pune, India. After obtaining both his licentiate and doctorate from the prestigious Biblicum, Rome, he has contributed to the study of the Bible and especially through his Biblical commentaries in Marathi, the language of Maharashtra, India.

== Early life and education ==
Francis Pereira was born on 4 December 1931, at Vadawali, Palli, Vasai to Catholic parents. His parents were simple people without much formal education, sufficiently well to do; they had their own farm and vegetable garden. Francis' parents him deep faith and genuine piety, integrity and honesty, love for all without discrimination of caste and creed, especially the poor and needy around in their neighbourhood.

Pereira and his brother and four sisters grew up in an atmosphere of peace and happiness within the family and in the neighbourhood. Two of his sisters were religious nuns.

After his high school studies, he obtained a Bachelor of Science (Hons) at Bombay University in 1953, after which he joined the Society of Jesus in Andheri, Mumbai. He obtained a master's degree in philosophy (Barcelona, Spain) and in theology (Pontifical Athenaeum, Jnana Deepa, Institute of Philosophy and Theology, Pune.

Pereira was ordained a priest on 18 March 1964.

== Academic career ==
Pereira was appointed to teach Sacred Scripture in Jnana Deepa, Institute of Philosophy and Theology. Accordingly, he did his Licentiate in Sacred Scripture at the Pontifical Biblical Institute, Rome. He started teaching New Testament Scripture in 1969.

After teaching for a couple of years, he did his Doctorate in Sacred Scripture at the same Biblical Institute in 1975, under the guidance of Fr. C.M. Martini, S.J. (later Cardinal Martini). Most of his life from 1969 onwards has been spent in teaching at Jnana Deepa, Institute of Philosophy and Theology (while staying at the Papal Seminary to which Jnana Deepa, Institute of Philosophy and Theology was attached in the beginning), except for a break of five years from 2000 to 2005, when he was called to St. Pius College Seminary at Goregaon, Mumbai, to teach Scripture and to be a spiritual guide.

== Written works ==
Pereira has written several Marathi commentaries on the New Testament, noteworthy due to the lack of commentaries that had previously been published in Marathi.

- Ephesus: Climax of Universalism in Luke-Acts. A Redaction Critical Study of Acts 19:23- 20:1 (1983); Gujarat Sahitya Prakash, Anand, India
- Gripped by God in Christ. The Mind and Heart of St. Paul (1990); St. Paul Publications, Bandra, Mumbai
- Jesus: The Human and Humane Face of God. The Portrait of Jesus in Luke’s Gospel (2000); The Bombay Saint. Paul Society, Bandra, Mumbai
- The Letters of St. Paul (2007); Jeevan Darshan Prakashan, Diocese of Vasai, Giriz, Vasai, Thane Dist., Maharashtra, India
- Gospel of St. Luke (2011); Media Commission Prakashan, Diocese of Vasai, Jeevan Darshan Kendra, Giriz, Vasai, Thane Dist., Maharashtra, India
- Gospel of St. John (2013); Media Commission Prakashan, Diocese of Vasai, Jeevan Darshan Kendra, Giriz, Vasai, Thane Dist., Maharashtra, India
- The Acts of the Apostles; Media Commission Prakashan, Diocese of Vasai, Jeevan Daeshan Kendra, Giriz, Vasai, Thane Dist., Maharashtra, India
- The Book of Revelation (2013); Media Commission Prakashan, Diocese of Vasai, Jeevan Darshan Kendra, Giriz, Vasai, Thane Dist., Maharashtra, India

== Personal life ==
=== Spiritual experience ===
Beginning in 1982, Fr. Francis has had a number of spiritual experiences which strengthened his faith. The first was the massive heart attack in 1982. In 1993, he fell in the bathroom at home in Vasai, and fractured his right femur and shoulder bone. The femur fracture, however, healed miraculously. While he was recovering from the shoulder bone minor fracture, he had a mild stroke in May 1994.

Starting in 2003 Fr. Francis has suffered from serious vertigo. In April 2008 he had a severe stroke, and a year later he had a prostate operation. In all these experiences, he has said he sincerely feels that the power of the Lord has allowed him to recover from these ailments.

=== The person ===
In the perception of the staff and students in the Papal Seminary:

- "Fr. Francis has been an effective spiritual director for so many young seminarians. He has guided them through proper direction and given them the message of love and intimate relationship with the Lord. Many bishops, provincials of both men’s and women’s Congregations have also profited from his spiritual guidance. Though he has dedicated his priestly ministry mainly to the formation of young seminarians, he has special love for the laity. This is evident when Fr. Francis gets visitors young and old from far and wide. As a person he is lovable, kind, understanding, outgoing, compassionate, and prayerful. Fr. Francis is always in the hearts of young seminarians. Many of his students still cherish the old memories of Fr. Francis and visit the Papal Seminary, the 'home of love'. Many of his students are holding high positions like cardinals, archbishops, bishops and VGs and good priests and religious in the church of India and the church at large. For him a priest is a man of God, a man for others; someone who aims at being 'fully human in Christ'."
