= Divurum Bodhi Viharaya =

Buddhist temple in Kandy, Sri Lanka

- දිවුරුම් බෝධී විහාරය
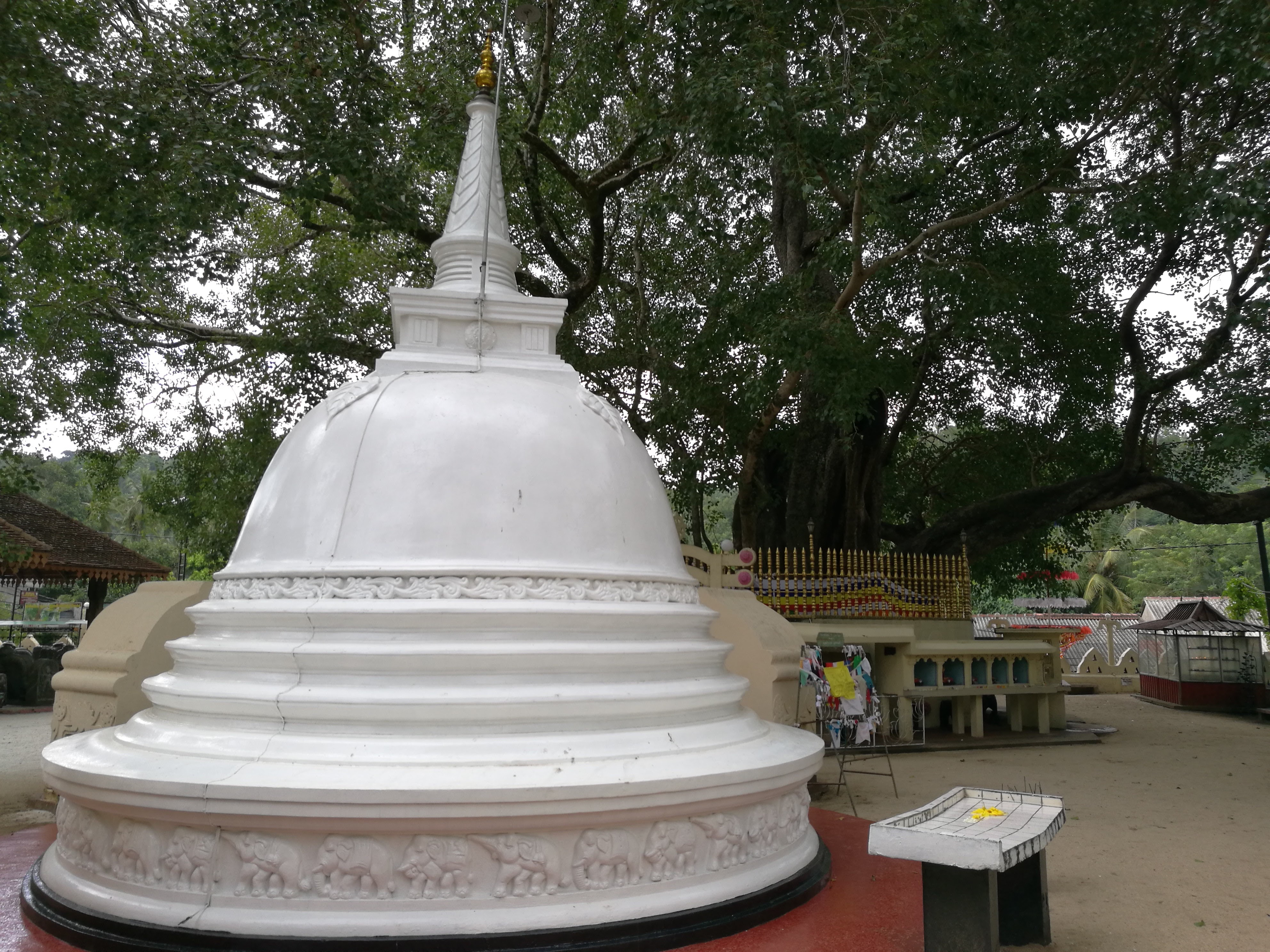
- Pagoda of Divurum Bodhi Viharaya

Religion
- Affiliation: Buddhism
- District: Kandy District
- Province: Central Province
- Patron: Ven. Kolabisse Tilakasiri Thera

Location
- Location: Ampitiya
- Municipality: Ampitiya
- Country: Sri Lanka
- Sector: Ramanya Nikaya

Architecture
- Type: Buddhist Temple
- Established: 1914

Divurum Bodhi Viharaya (Sinhala: දිවුරුම් බෝධි විහාරය or Purana Divurum Bodhi Maha Viharaya) is a Theravada Buddhist temple in the Kandy District, Sri Lanka. It is located on Ampitiya Road, Ampitiya.

According to locals, the Bodhi Tree is 650 years old. During the Kingdom of Kandy, kings had used a part of the temple ground as a court and made the accused swear that they haven't done the crime. Divurum Sinhala: දිවුරුම් translates to swearing. The accused had to touch a swearing stone, Divurum Gala Sinhala: දිවුරුම් ගල. According to Kandyan folklore, if the accused lied, within 3 days a cobra would bite them and kill the accused.

The swearing stone with the sun and the moon engravings believed to be constructed during Kingdom of Dambadeniya.
