= The Theological Method of Samkara =

The Theological Method of Samkara is Richard De Smet's doctoral dissertation, defended at the Pontifical Gregorian University, Rome, in 1953, with Fr Renatus Arnou, SJ as director. The dissertation, which rapidly became well-known, remains unpublished. The dissertation proposed that Sankara was not so much a pure philosopher, but rather a srutivadin or theologian, an exegete or hermeneutician of the scriptures. It also proposed that the doctrine of indirect signification (lakṣaṇā) plays a central role in Sankara's theological method. However, in the dissertation itself, De Smet does not arrive clearly at his later rejection of the classical illusionist (mayavadin) monistic interpretation of Sankara in favour of a non-dualist 'realist' one.

== Reception ==
De Smet himself reports that he sent the dissertation to various specialists in 1954, people like Olivier Lacombe, Hajime Nakamura, S. K. Belvalkar, Dhirendra Mohan Datta, Paul Hacker, Helmuth von Glasenapp, Pierre Johanns, A.J. Alston, Louis Renou, A.C. Mukerji, Daniel Ingalls, Jacques-Albert Cuttat, H.O. Mascarenhas and J.B. van Buitenen, who seem to have appraised it positively.

While De Smet's thesis has not been completely accepted among Indologists in general and among specialists of Sankara, it has received a positive reception by K. Satchidananda Murty in his Revelation and Reason in Advaita and by Anantanand Rambachan in his Accomplishing the Accomplished: The Vedas as a Source of Valid Knowledge in Sankara.

== Publication ==
In one of his last letters, De Smet had given permission for the publication of an updated and edited version of his thesis to George McLean, who worked with Bradley J. Malkovsky towards this end. In his introduction to the De Smet commemorative volume, Malkovsky indicates that publication is in process. The publication is still awaited.

== Bibliography ==
- De Smet, Richard. The Theological Method of Samkara. Pontifical Gregorian University, Rome, 1953 (unpublished).
- Murty, K. Satchidananda. Revelation and Reason in Advaita. Waltair: Andhra University Press, 1959; reprint Delhi: Motilal Banarsidass, 1974.
- Rambachan, A. Accomplishing the Accomplished: The Veda as a Source of Valid Knowledge in Śaṅkara. Honolulu: University of Hawaii Press, 1991.
- Malkovsky, Bradley J. “Introduction: The Life and Work of Richard V. De Smet, S.J.” New Perspectives on Advaita Vedānta: Essays in Commemoration of Professor Richard De Smet, S.J. Ed. Bradley J. Malkovsky. Leiden / Boston / Köln: Brill, 2000.
- Clooney, F.X. Theology after Vedānta: An Experiment in Comparative Theology. Albany: State University of New York Press, 1993. Delhi: Sri Satguru Publications, 1993.
- Coelho, Ivo. "Introduction." Understanding Sankara: Essays by Richard De Smet. Ed. Ivo Coelho. Delhi: Motilal Banarsidass, forthcoming. 1-30.
