= Sara Grant =

British Indologist and Christian missionary (1922–2002)

Sara Grant, RSCJ (19 December 1922 – 2002) was a British Indologist, Christian missionary, and one of the pioneers of interreligious dialogue in the twentieth century. She came to India in 1956, as a missionary and member of the Religious of the Sacred Heart of Jesus, became actively engaged in interreligious dialogue in India. In time, she became a leading figure in the inculturation (imbibing local cultures) movement that was started in India by Roman Catholic priest Fr Richard De Smet, SJ in the early 1970s, with whom she was closely associated. Her association with Swami Abhishiktananda, further led to working on the Advaita Vedanta (Nondualism) teachings of Hindu philosopher Adi Sankara, as revealed in her spiritual autobiography, Towards an Alternative Theology: Confessions of a Non-dualist Christian (1991).

She taught philosophy in Mumbai and Pune for several years, and spent many years as co-acharya of the Christa Prema Seva Ashram in Pune, which combines the Hindu ashram and sannyasa model and Christian monasticism.

== Early life and education ==
Sara Grant was born to Scottish parents in Shrewsbury, England, in 1922, and received her early education at the Convent of the Sacred Heart, Brighton.

Having converted to Roman Catholicism after finishing school at the age of 19, she joined the Religious of the Sacred Heart of Jesus order and entered the novitiate. She moved to countryside during the Second World War, and later to Oxford University, where she studied classics and philosophy and where one of her mentors was noted British author and philosopher, Iris Murdoch, herself then in the throes of a religious conversion.

== Career ==
Sr Sara Grant came as a missionary to India in 1956, to head the newly formed Department of Philosophy at Sophia College (University of Mumbai), Mumbai run by Society of the Sacred Heart of Jesus, here she taught for many years. Under the influence and guidance of Fr Richard De Smet, SJ, she studied Sanskrit and did a doctorate in the University of Bombay on the concept of relation in Adi Sankaracarya, (ca. 700 AD), the authoritative Hindu exponent of the doctrine of non-duality (Advaita). Here she also became close friends with Swami Abhishiktananda, a French Benedictine monk, whose biography she later published in 1998, as Swami Abhishiktananda: The man and his message. In the coming years, she drew upon philosophy of Thomas Aquinas, to embarked upon a path of reconciling Indian and Christian philosophy. Her work with Sankara, and focus on the understanding of Advaita Vedanta, culminated in the drawing parallels with Christian doctrines.

She became a member of the ecumenical religious community (Anglican and Catholic) of the innovative Christa Prema Seva Ashram (CPS), Shivajinagar, Pune - India. During these years, she also taught Indian philosophy at Jnana-Deepa Vidyapeeth, Pune, the Catholic Pontifical Institute of Philosophy and Theology.

She was invited on occasion to lecture on Sankaracarya at Sivananda Ashram, Rishikesh, where she reports that her interpretation of Sankara was well received.

Sara Grant was one of the most active Catholics in the area of interreligious dialogue in the second half of the twentieth century. She liked to describe herself as a 'Non-Dualist Christian' (see the bibliography below).

Her spiritual autobiography, Towards an Alternative Theology: Confessions of a Non-Dualist Christian was published in 1991. It was originally the Teape Lectures delivered at the University of Cambridge in 1989. In 1993 she received the first "Ba-Bapu Puraskar" Prize by Gandhians in Pune, followed by "eminent Ecumenical Educator Award", by the All-India Association for Christian Higher Education.

== Sources ==
Source:"Sara Grant, RSCJ (1922-2002)". Indian Christian Writings. 19 August 2009.

=== Primary source ===
- "The 'Viveka' within the Heart." Theological Education in India Today, ed. Felix Wilfred. Bangalore: Asian Trading Corporation, 1985. 103–109.
- The Lord of the Dance and Other Papers. Bangalore: Asian Trading Corporation, 1987.
- Descent to the Source: Texts for Meditation from the Hindu and Christian Scriptures. Bangalore: Asian Trading Corporation, 1987.
- "Growth in Community: A Theological Perspective." The Way Supplement 62 (Summer 1988) 33–51. [Check]
- "Shared Prayer and Sharing of Scriptures." Sharing Worship: Communicatio in Sacris, ed. Paul Puthanangady. Bangalore: NBCLC, 1988. 459–481.
- Towards an Alternative Theology: Confessions of a Non-dualist Christian (The Teape Lectures). Asian Trading Corporation, Bengaluru. 1991. ISBN 978-81-7086-154-6.
- Saṅkarācārya's Concept of Relation,. Motilal Banarsidass Publ., 1999. ISBN 81-208-1597-1.
- Swami Abhishiktananda: The man and his message, by Sara Grant, 1998, ISPCK, ISBN 81-7214-120-3.

=== Secondary literature ===
- Bertha Wilcox, RSCJ, and Josef Neuner, SJ. "In Memoriam: Sr. Sara Grant, RSCJ (1922-2002)." Vidyajyoti 64 (2000) 456–459.
- A Way into Meditation, by Sr. Sara Grant, RSCJ Monastic Interreligious Dialogue (MID), Bulletin 53, May 1995.
