= Silvio Galizia =

Swiss architect (1925–1989)

Silvio Galizia (August 5, 1925, in Muri AG – November 28, 1989, in Rome) was a Swiss architect and artist. Most of his life he lived and worked in Rome, Italy.

== Life ==
Silvio Galizia studied at the ETH Zurich. He gained his first professional experience in Zurich, Basel and Geneva. 1951–1952 he worked in Poona (India). In 1953 he settled in Rome (Italy). Here he first worked in Riccardo Morandi's studio, soon became self-employed and developed a lively planning and construction activity, mainly church buildings and other buildings for religious orders. From 1960 his artistic activity also included the design of the stained glass windows and mosaics, the altars and sculptures, the furniture and the other facilities.

1984–1985 he realized the university and planned the cathedral of Lomé (Togo). Silvio Galizia died on November 28, 1989, in Rome. In addition to his architectural works, he left behind an extensive oeuvre of pictures, drawings, etchings (portraits, landscapes and still lifes), collages and plastic works.

== Major works ==
- 1951–57: University College and church (Papal Seminary) in Poona (India)
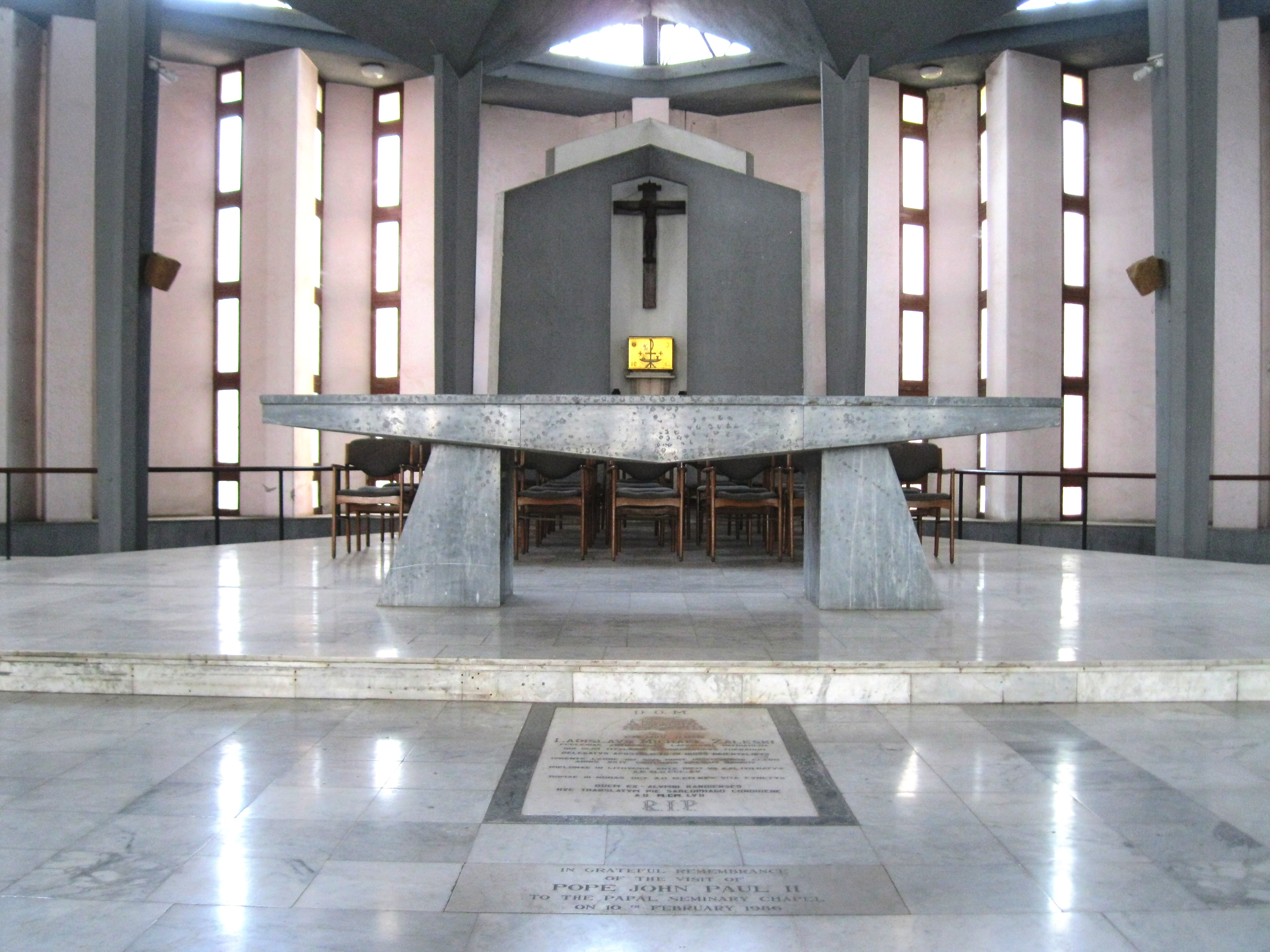
  Interior of the Papal Seminary Chapel in Pune
- 1955–56: Reconstruction and chapel of the Collegio Internazionale Agostiniano (Rome, via del S. Uffizio 25) (together with S. Scalesse)
- 1957/64: Two private villas in Fregene and San Felice Circeo near Rome
- 1956-62: Pension in Terracina near Rome (Casa Hegelberger)
- 1957–58: Curia and chapel of the Suore Missionarie dello Spirito Santo (Rome, via della Camilluccia 591); in collaboration with Christian Norberg-Schulz and H. Mielva
- 1959: Curia, chapel and retirement home of the Suore di Betania dello Spirito Santo (Rome, via Achille Mauri 14)
- 1959–62: Curia and church "San Giovanni Battista" of the Missionari Verbiti (Nemi near Rome) (with altars and sculptures by his brother Romano Galizia from Muri / AG, Switzerland)
- 1960–63: Curia, chapel and retirement home of the Suore della Divina Provvidenza (Rome, via S. Giovanni Eudes 25), later owned by the Daughters of St. Paul.
- 1962–66: Reconstruction and expansion of the Teutonic Cemetery in the Vatican
- 1962–66: Chapel of the Collegio Pio Brasiliano (Rome, via Aurelia 527)
- 1962–68: Reconstruction and expansion of the Palazzo Zuccari, seat of the Bibliotheca Hertziana / Max Planck Institute (Rome, via Gregoriana 28)
- 1964–67: Seminar of the Collegio Messicano (Rome, via del Casaletto 31) (together with F. Giardino)
- 1964–68: Curia and chapel of the Padri e Suore Missionarie di Mariannhill (Rome, via S. Giovanni Eudes 91)
- 1966–68: Generalate of the Suore Medico-Missionarie Olandesi (Rome, via Raffaello Sardiello 20); later the Generalate of the Sisters of the Good Shepherd.
- 1966–68: Generalate and Chapel of the Sisters of Saint Paul of Chartres (Rome, via della Vignaccia 193)
- 1967–69: Monastery and church of Santa Maria degli Angeli and country courtyard of the Franciscan Sisters of Dillingen Danube (Rome, via della Storta 783)
- 1970–72: Reconstruction and crypt of the church of the monastery of S. Chiara (Rome, via Vitellia 97)
- 1971–73: Church and bell tower of the Suore della Carità e dell'Immacolata Concezione di Ivrea (Rome, via di Val Cannuta 200), with colored windows by Ernesto Tross
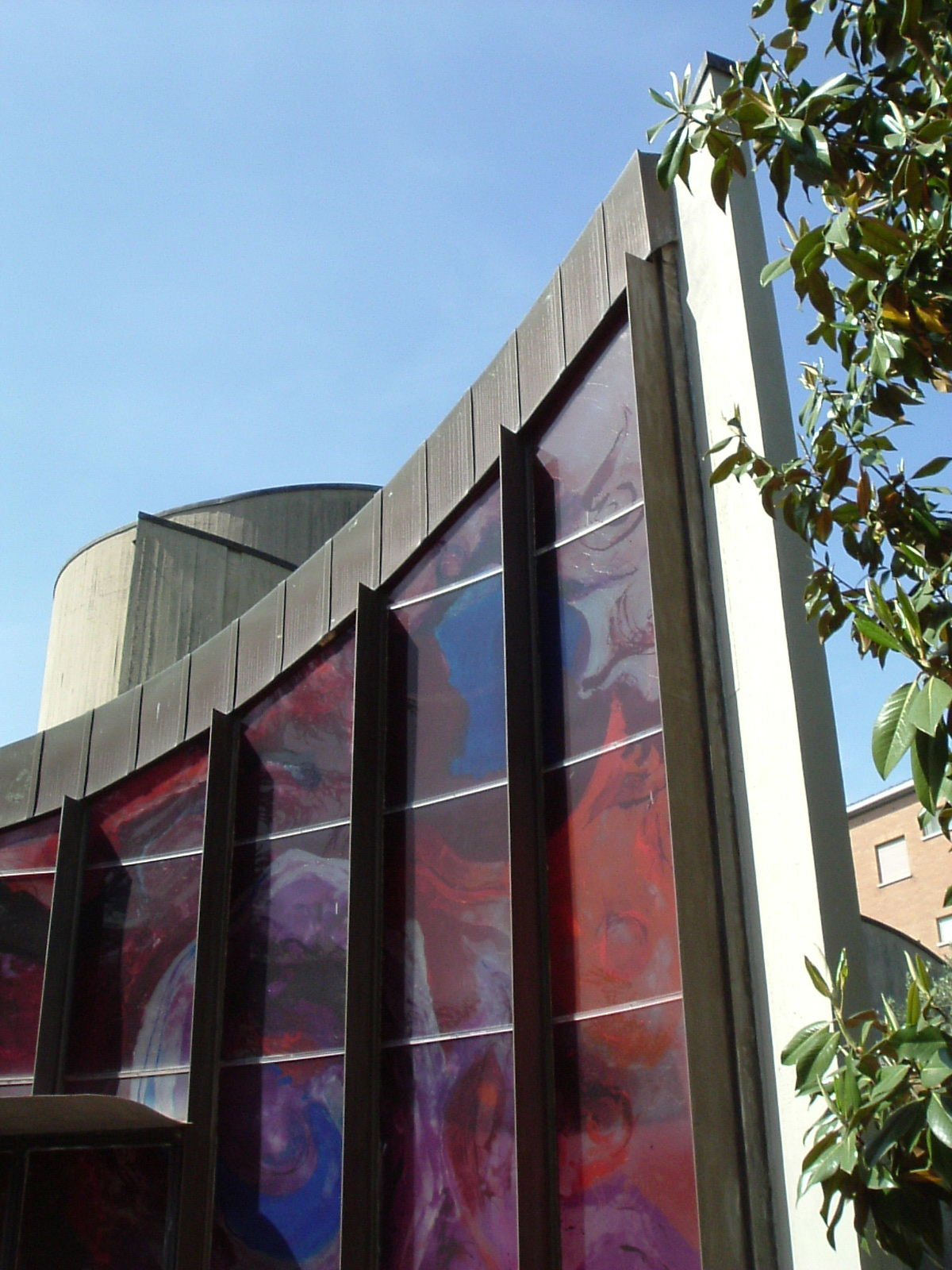
  External view of the Chapel in via di Val Cannuta 200, Rome
- 1973–76: Reconstruction and establishment of the Banca Popolare di Milano (Rome, P.le Flaminio 1) (in collaboration with V. Vannini)
- 1974 (approx.): Restoration and reconstruction of the church of the Convento francescano di S. Giuseppe in Assisi
- 1979-81: Restoration and construction of the crypt for the relics of St. Francis in the Basilica of the Saint in Assisi
- 1982-88: University College, Church and Seminary Jean Paul II in Lomé (Togo)

In 2005 the works and the personal archive of Silvio Galizia were included in the list of works of "historical interest" by the Italian state (Soprintendenza Archivistica).
