= Emerich Coreth =

Austrian philosopher and Catholic priest (1919–2006)

- Born: 10 August 1919; Raabs an der Thaya, Austria
- Died: 1 September 2006 (aged 87); Innsbruck, Austria
- Occupations: Philosopher, Catholic priest

Emerich Coreth, SJ (10 August 1919 – 1 September 2006) was an Austrian philosopher and Catholic priest. He is well known for his works on metaphysics and philosophical anthropology.

A close associate of Karl Rahner, Coreth is a renowned neo-Thomist of 20th century. He was the Rector of the University of Innsbruck and the Provincial of the Austrian Province of the Society of Jesus.

Born into an aristocratic family at Raabs an der Thaya, a small village in Lower Austria, near the border to the Czech Republic, he grew up in Vienna and joined the Jesuits in 1937. His sister Anna Coreth (1915–2008) was the director of the Austrian National Archives. Emerich's studies of philosophy in Pullach were interrupted by military service during the war. He completed his theological doctorate in Innsbruck and his philosophical doctorate in Rome, where he also worked as a tutor at the Germanicum. He then began teaching at the Faculty of Theology at the University of Innsbruck in 1950. Since 1955 he was Professor of Philosophy, and President, at the church-established Institutum Philosophicum Oenipontanum, and Head of the Institute for Christian Philosophy at the Faculty of Theology. In addition, he fulfilled leadership tasks in the Jesuit Order's administration of Innsbruck University: as Dean of the Faculty of Theology in 1957/58 and 1968/69, as Rector of the University of Innsbruck 1969–1971, and 1972–1977 as Provincial of the Austrian Province.

== Philosophy ==
Coreth specialised in metaphysics, philosophical anthropology, and history of philosophy. He was one of the philosophers who sought the creative recovery of Thomas Aquinas' metaphysics through the transcendental method introduced by Joseph Maréchal. Particularly, Coreth and other theologians attempted to revive the metaphysics of realism (Aristotelian-Thomistic metaphysics) by addressing the failure of Kantian philosophy using its presuppositions. One of Coreth's most important works was Metaphysik. This book refuted critics such as Etienne Gilson, who argued that transcendental turn among Thomists can only lead to phenomenalism or idealism.

Coreth maintained that instead of having an objective, metaphysics only has a subjective function. Metaphysics may thereby lose its foundation in being, but Coreth said that "our a priori knowledge is metaphysical knowledge of being, which opens for us the absolute horizon of being as such." He based his metaphysics on the human ability to ask questions and on the "conditions for the possibility" of questions. Using the transcendental method, questions attain better clarity.

== Books ==
- Das dialektische Sein in Hegels Logik. Wien: Herder 1952
- Grundfragen des menschlichen Daseins. Innsbruck; Wien; München: Tyrolia 1956
- Metaphysik: Eine methodisch-systematische Grundlegung. Innsbruck; Wien; München: Tyrolia 1961
- Metaphysics. New York: Herder and Herder 1968 (Translated by Joseph Donceel).
- Grundfragen der Hermeneutik: Ein philosophischer Beitrag. Freiburg i. Br.; Basel; Wien: Herder 1969
- Was ist der Mensch?: Grundzüge einer philosophischen Anthropologie. Innsbruck, Wien, München: Tyrolia 1973 ISBN 3-7022-1098-9
- With Harald Schöndorf: Philosophie des 17. und. 18. Jahrhunderts. Stuttgart u.a.: Kohlhammer Verlag 1983 ISBN 3-17-008030-X
- With Peter Ehlen und Josef Schmidt: Philosophie des 19. Jahrhunderts. Stuttgart u.a.: Kohlhammer Verlag 1984 ISBN 3-17-008031-8
- Vom Sinn der Freiheit. Innsbruck; Wien: Tyrolia 1985 ISBN 3-7022-1560-3
- With Peter Ehlen, Gerd Haeffner und Friedo Ricken: Philosophie des 20. Jahrhunderts. Stuttgart u.a.: Kohlhammer Verlag 1986 ISBN 3-17-008462-3
- (Ed.): Christliche Philosophie im katholischen Denken des 19. und 20. Jahrhunderts. 3 Bde. Graz; Wien; Köln: Styria 1987–1990
- Grundriss der Metaphysik. Innsbruck; Wien: Tyrolia 1994 ISBN 3-7022-1951-X
- Die Theologische Fakultät Innsbruck: ihre Geschichte und wissenschaftliche Arbeit von den Anfängen bis zur Gegenwart. Innsbruck: Leopold-Franzens-Univ. 1995 ISBN 3-901249-26-5
- Beiträge zur christlichen Philosophie. Hrsg. von Christian Kanzian. (Bibliography E. Coreth, pp. 409–415) Innsbruck; Wien: Tyrolia 1999 ISBN 3-7022-2257-X
- Gott im philosophischen Denken. Stuttgart u.a.: Kohlhammer Verlag 2001 ISBN 3-17-016723-5
- Otto Muck (Hg.): Sinngestalten. Metaphysik in der Vielfalt menschlichen Fragens. Festschrift für Emerich Coreth. Innsbruck/Wien 1989. (Bibliography E. Coreth, pp. 389–408): Tyrolia 1989 ISBN 3-7022-1697-9
