= Kuruvilla Pandikattu =

Indian philosopher (born 1957)

Kuruvilla Pandikattu Joseph
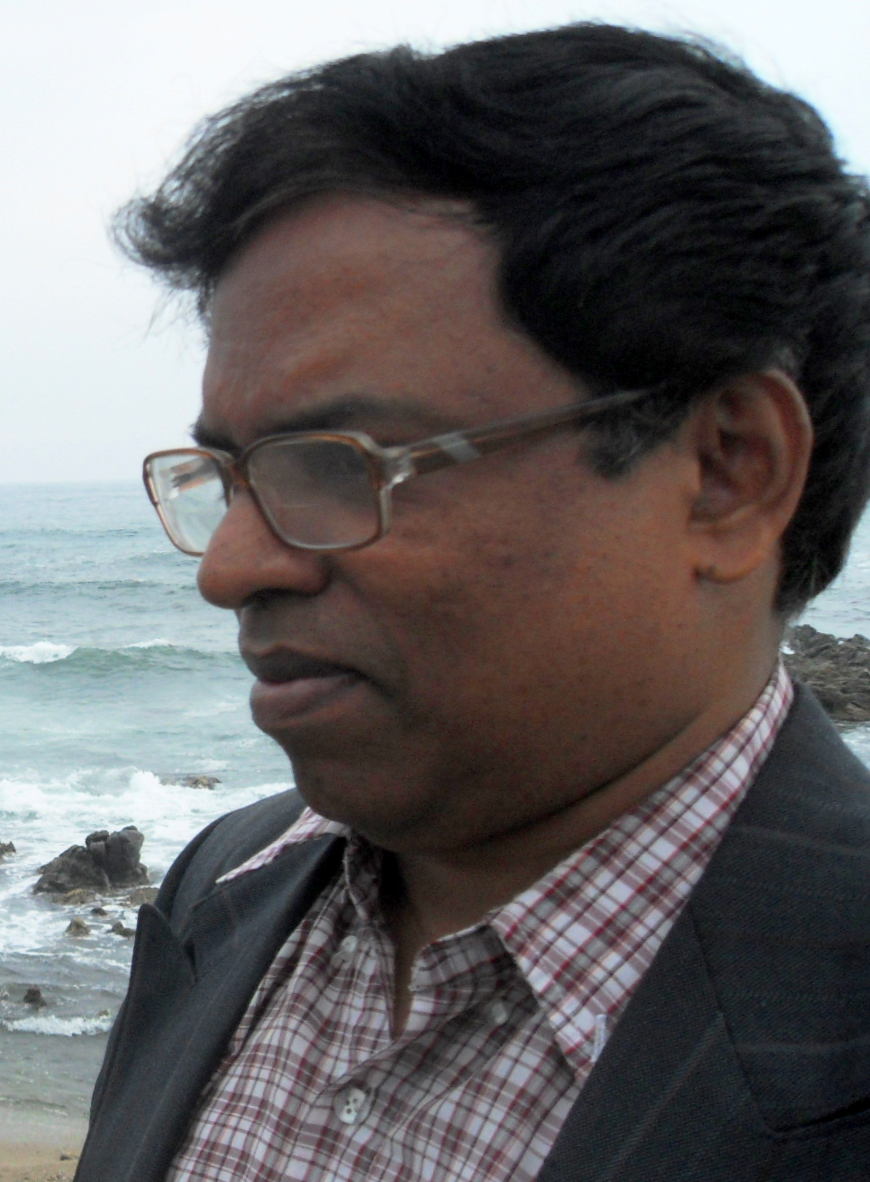
- Pandikattu in 2004
- Born: 28 November 1957 (age 68); Areekara, Kerala, India
- Mother: Mary Joseph Uthuppan

Education
- Education: University of Pune; University of Innsbruck, St. Joseph's College, Trichy
- Theses: Idols to Die, Symbols to Live: Paul Ricoeur (1996); Dialogue as Way of Life: Bede Griffiths (1995)
- Doctoral advisor: Emerich Coreth (PhD in Philosophy); Lothar Lies (PhD in Theology)

Philosophical work
- Era: Contemporary philosophy
- Region: Western philosophy
- School: Continental; Phenomenology; Hermeneutics
- Institutions: XLRI – Xavier School of Management
- Main interests: Phenomenology; Relationship between religion and science; Philosophy of death; Philosophy of technology; Personal identity; Transhumanism; Myths and symbols; Metaphor; Artificial intelligence; Business ethics
- Notable ideas: Dialogue as "ever approachable, never attainable"; Dialogue as "way of life"; human being as between before and beyond"; "Useless, but not meaningless"; Manageability trap
- Website: kuru.in

Kuruvilla Pandikattu Joseph (born 28 November 1957) is an Indian Catholic priest and philosopher. He is Professor (Emeritus) of Philosophy, Science and Religion at Jnana Deepa, Institute of Philosophy and Theology, Pune, Maharashtra, India. He was also Director of JDV Centre for Science-Religion Studies (JCSR) and Association of Science, Society and Religion (ASSR), Pune.

He has authored/edited 36 books and written more than 160 academic articles. He is also a co-founder and has been a co-publisher of two journals, Jnanadeepa: Pune Journal of Religious Studies and AUC: Asian Journal of Religious Studies. His weekly column on "Contemporary Spirituality" appeared in Financial Chronicle for eight years. He has been contributing regularly to both academic and popular journals.

He is involved in science-religion dialogue and science-related activities and teaches courses on them. His areas of interest (and specialization) include: Science-Religion Dialogue; Philosophical Anthropology (Emerich Coreth); Hermeneutics (Paul Ricœur) and inter-religious dialogue (Bede Griffiths).

== Early life and influences ==
Pandikattu was born in Areekara, Kerala, India He was born to Uthuppan and Mary Joseph. He had his early education at Government LP School, Veliyannoor (1962–65) and St. Rockey's U.P. School, Areekara (1965–70). Then he pursued his basic studies at Sacred Heart School, Changanassery, Kerala (1970–73), India.

After completing his School Secondary Leaving Certificate (S.S.L.C.) at Changanassery, he left for Guhiajori, Dumka, Bihar (now Jharkhand). Other places of his studies are: St. Xavier's School, Sahibganj (1976–78); Loyola College, Chennai (1978–81); St. Joseph's College, Trichy (1981–83); Jnana Deepa, Institute of Philosophy and Theology, Pune (1983–85), and University of Pune (1988–91).

== Philosophical approach ==
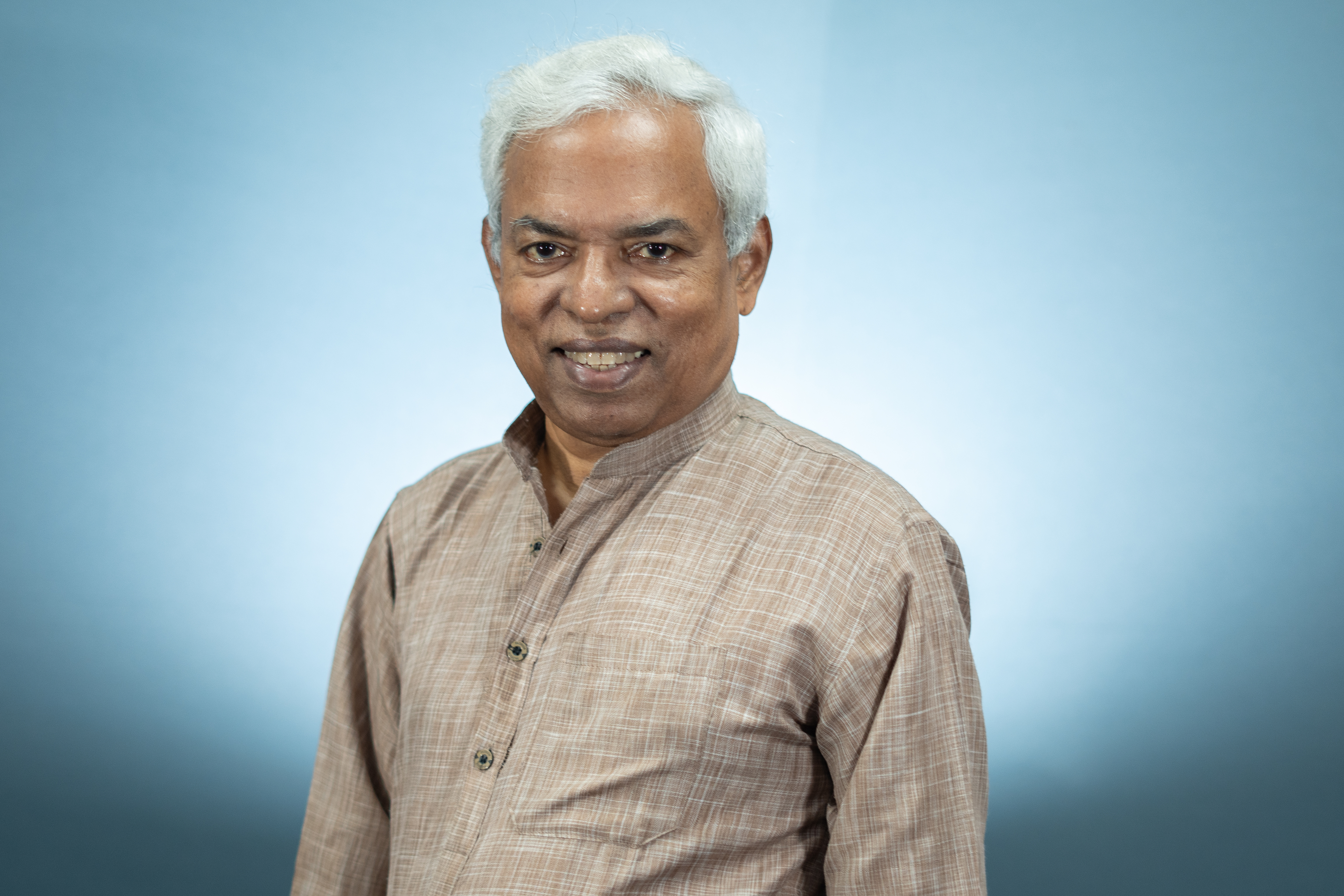
Prof Kuruvilla Pandikattu SJ, XLRI, Xavier School of Business, Jamshedpur

The starting points of Pandikattu's academic research are physics, philosophy (metaphysics) and religion (theology). He became interested in the quest for the unification of the fourfold forces of nature in physics and the hermeneutics of dialogue by Paul Ricoeur. This led him to explore the interpretive and symbolic (or mythic) nature of religious experience and inspired his first doctoral thesis: Idols to die, so that symbols might live. He traces the idol-symbol tension back to every aspect of human experience.

Evoking the tensional and paradoxical life of human beings, he holds to a dynamic and humanistic understanding of human beings, who transcend their own self-understanding and definitions. Human being is the tensional appropriation between the past and the future, the memory and hope, the actual and the potential. It is in this tensional existence that human beings realise their own ever-evolving nature, including that of bound freedom and limited relationship. As bound to freedom, they are finite beings seeking the infinite. Experiencing limited love, they want to widen the horizon of understanding. Based on the concrete experiences of pleasure, they are open to the infinite bliss that remains open and ever elusive.

Thus, he concludes that humans are free, to a very limited extent. This limited freedom provides him with the dignity and worth that they possess. They are capable of genuine love, also to a very limited extent, and establishing relationships, in spite of the contrary claims and experiences.

=== Death: Live It! ===
As part of the dynamically tensional existence, human beings are “being-unto-death,” where the possibility of their own impossibility is always on the horizon. At the same time, he is convinced that only "Once you learn how to die, you learn how to live" (Mitch Albom). ' Following Michel de Montaigne we may hold that “To philosophize is to learn to die.” So, as human beings, we are called to live gratefully and accept death gracefully! The paradox of life is when we recognise the depth of life, we also experience the depth of death!

Further, as human beings, we need to take seriously the possibility of our own collective annihilation (Sixth Mass Extinction, Ecological Crises, etc.) or enhancement (Artificial Intelligence, Technological Singularity, Moral Creativity, etc.).

=== Dialogue: Ever Approachable, Never Attainable ===
For him, human life is a dialogical encounter, this viewpoint suggests we approach the other more and more, but never exhaustively. Ours is always an asymptotic relationship that keeps on growing and does not achieve its fullness. In a dialogical mode, we are in the process, collectively, of realising our own selves. It is a challenging and painstaking process, demanding acceptance (of the past mistakes), forgiveness and readiness to reconcile.

Pandikattu considers the dialogical dimension not only to religions but also to human existence. His second doctoral thesis on Bede Griffiths was published under the title Dialog as Way of Life.. He also took up issues in science-religion dialogue, which, according to him, is "not an option but an obligation" for the very survival of the human species, believing it called for radical commitment. Two main areas of his research are physical immortality and a viable or sustainable lifestyle. He is convinced that genuine and painful dialogue is the only way forward for the human community.

From such a dialogical aspect, the whole reality is dialogical. The infinite or God (also referred to as "The Reality") is our human life's enticing and elusive dimension. God is ever-approachable, but never attainable exhaustively. Like the horizon, which invites and recedes from us, God is always near and far at the same time. He bases this insight on scientific details like the lowest temperature reachable (t →0) and knowing that the beginning of Big Bang (T →0) is like the "horizon" which is never fully attainable.

Pandikattu says that the dialogical reality is relational and, at the same time, paradoxical. The paradox of love is that when two people who have accepted their own emptiness and recognize their own nothingness affirm each other, there emerges authentic love that is infinite. Thus, when one truly looks at reality and accepts its nothingness (even absurdity), there emerge traces of infinity. That is the paradoxical beauty of love and of our existence.

Further, he pleads for a culture of dialogue between traditions, religions, nations and among science and religion. Without such dialogue, our human destiny is threatened. It is very challenging to enter into a dialogue with those who do not want it or are inimical to our world view, he acknowledges. Still, he believes that dialogue is the only way of life for contemporary society.

== Ethical commitment ==
Pandikattu has authored and edited several influential works on ethics, focusing on business responsibility, sustainability, and applied ethical reasoning. In 2023, he published Business Ethics: Textbook of Concepts and Cases, which consists of 65 thematic chapters and 20 case studies designed to illustrate the application of ethical principles in organizational and managerial contexts.

In July 2025, he served as editor of Applied Ethics and Rationality: Contemporary Indian Perspectives in Springer’s series Studies in Applied Philosophy, Epistemology and Rational Ethics (vol. 74). The book brings together Indian and international scholars to address issues such as organizational ethics, environmental responsibility, technology, and moral philosophy in practice.

His most recent contribution is Business Ethics: Advanced Concepts and Cases (2025), which presents 90 chapters across ten sections, integrating Jesuit values with contemporary challenges including ESG, AI ethics, and stakeholder capitalism. The book features a foreword by the 14th Dalai Lama and emphasizes moral leadership as essential for human flourishing.

Earlier, in 2022, he authored Ethics, Sustainability and Fratelli Tutti, a work that places Pope Francis’s encyclical Fratelli Tutti in dialogue with ecological responsibility, business ethics, and interreligious solidarity. The book argues that sustainability must be rooted not only in economic or environmental concerns but also in an inclusive spirituality that affirms human dignity and fraternity.

== Existential concern ==
Pandikattu has argued that humanity may be living in either its best generation, with unprecedented advances in science and technology, or potentially its last, given ecological crises, nuclear threats, and social fragmentation. For him, technological progress by itself cannot guarantee human survival; rather, the decisive factor is the cultivation of moral and spiritual consciousness. He resonates with Teilhard de Chardin’s conviction that “someday… we shall harness the energies of love,… without which we would be living the last generation.”

In this regard, Pandikattu also recalls Martin Luther King Jr.’s famous admonition: “We must learn to live together as brothers [or sisters] or perish together as fools.” He interprets this as an urgent call for solidarity, compassion, and ethical responsibility. For him, while technology may have made people neighbours, only spiritual and moral awakening can make them brothers and sisters. Without this ethical conversion, he warns, humanity risks forfeiting its future to violence, indifference, and ecological collapse.

== Major activities ==
Pandikattu has been actively involved in promoting science-religion dialogue, since he believes that there cannot be any real contradiction between these two (diverse and complementary) sources of knowledge. He is interested in looking at both science and religion critically and creatively, so that they can enrich each other and humanity. In this area, he has delivered numerous lectures, written numerous articles and books and organised conferences.

== Publications ==
=== Journals ===
- Former editor, Jnanadeepa: Pune Journal of Religious Studies
- Former editor, AUC: Asian Journal of Religious Studies
- Former editor, Vidyankur: Journal of Philosophical and Theological Studies
- Founder/Former editor, JD Philosophy Series

=== Books ===
He has authored/edited more than 68 books and written more than 210 academic articles.
