= Robert Antoine =

Belgian Jesuit priest, missionary in India and professor

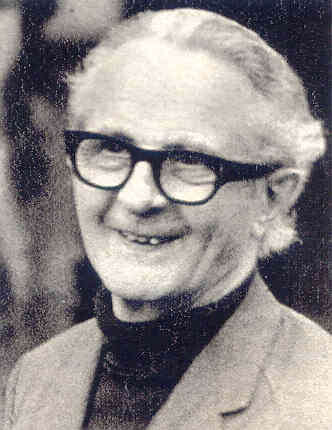
Robert Antoine (1914-1981)

Robert Antoine (1914 in Belgium – 1981 Calcutta, India) was a Belgian Jesuit priest, missionary in India. Professor of Comparative Literature at the Jadavpur University, he was a Sanskritist and musician. He was co-founder, with Pierre Fallon, of Shanti Bhavan, a dialogue centre at Calcutta.

== Education ==
Antoine entered the Society of Jesus in 1932, was sent to Calcutta in 1939, dedicated himself to the study of Sanskrit, and became the first Jesuit to obtain a master's degree from the University of Calcutta in Sanskrit philology. Besides this, he held a Licentiate in Philosophy, a Licentiate in Theology, a B.A. Classics.

== Work ==
Antoine arrived in India in 1939 and became an Indian citizen in 1950. His untimely death from liver cancer occurred in 1981. During the 42 years he spent in India, mainly in Calcutta, he contributed much to the Bengali culture, the diffusion of Sanskrit and the life of the Church in Bengal. In the words of Felix Raj, "he was an eminent priest, a scholar, an accomplished teacher, a gifted musician and singer and a dear friend". From 1956, he was lecturer in the Department of Comparative Literature of the Jadavpur University. He also taught at St. Xavier's College, Calcutta. In 1950 he founded the dialogue center Shanti Bhavan with Pierre Fallon as a center of inter-faith, inter-cultural dialogue and their home amidst a population of middle-class intelligentsia. For many years, their periodical, Darśan Cakra, attracted keen professors of philosophy and other intellectuals. But Shanti Bhavan was above all a centre of friendly conversations, music, songs, bhajans and Eucharistic liturgy. From there Antoine produced his ten books (Sanskrit manual, Bengali hymn book, translations, Indological essays, ecumenical dialogue, etc.) and as many articles.

Special mention must be made of Religious Hinduism, which Antoine, with some other Jesuit friends, had planned, first as a series of 24 monthly letters which appeared from June 1957 to June 1959, then, with Joseph Neuner and Richard De Smet as editors, as an enlarged book in 1964. Antoine contributed himself nine of the chapters of this book; a 'third' revised edition was produced in 1968, and a fourth in 1997.

Most of his articles are archived by the Jadavpur Journal of Comparative Literature, published by the Department of Comparative Literature, Jadavpur University, annually. In Volume 6 (1966), edited by Naresh Guha, Father Antoine's article titled "The Vision of Dante" was published. Here he discussed critically the approaches to Dante's The Divine Comedy, analyzing the role of Virgil and allegories used by Dante. The Volume 8 (1968), edited by Amiya Dev, have his article titled "Greek Tragedy and Sanskrit Drama". Here he discussed how both Greek Tragedies and Sanskrit literary pieces were inspired by their respective epic traditions, yet when the Greek literary pieces were meant for competition, Sanskrit pieces were to satisfy the ‘ critical taste of refined audience'. The 9th Volume of JJCL, published his article titled "Classical Forms of the Simile". He studied two different techniques in the use of literary images. He took the examples of Greek literature and Dante, and explained that when in West, literary images were taken as an analogy, in East, poets like Kalidasa preferred using images as alamkaras, extolling virtues. In used padas, succession of images can be traced, each describing virtues of the characters like Sita or Shakuntala. Antoine, critically commented on the use of these images and similes.

The 11th Volume was edited by Amiya Dev. It has an essay named "Calliope and the Epic of Ravana". Here he discussed oral epic tradition of Ramayana and Homeric epics, and how those symbolically represented multiple strands of culture and practice of their roots. Substantiating how Calliope's language was a language of myth and 'quest of a society', while the multiple layers of narration in The Ramayana played with narrative motifs, Antoine unpacked how the narrative voice and position had significant role in the oral narratives. The 12th Volume published his article titled "Calliope and Rama’s Initiation". With reference to The Ramayana and The Iliad, he argued that to fathom the framework and richness of epic tradition, the emphasis should be on the materials and messages of the long oral tradition, abandoning the concept of 'original'. JJCL 13th Volume published his article titled "From Aristotle to Roland Barthes", that was part of the annual lectures at the Amal Bhattacharjee Memorial Centre for European Studies in Calcutta. In this article he stated how Aristotle's ideas of plot structure and evaluation of plot can be interpreted with reference to Russian Formalism, Linguistic Analogies and Levels of Narratives. He stated that when Aristotle's propositions would be scrutinized in these critical approaches, the hidden dynamism of narratives would unfold the working of story-telling and synchronic character of its language. In the JJCL 16–17th Volume, his article titled " Bharata and Aristotle" explained how Greek Tragedy and Sanskrit comedy weren't merely two conceptions of dramatic action, but also be scrutinized if testified with the tenets by Bharata regarding 'five avasthas' and Aristotle's ideas on 'Complex Plot' as he discussed in his Poetics. The 20–21st Volume printed his essay " The Curse in Oedipus Rex and Abhijnanashakuntalam". Here he discussed how despite 'curse' being a motif of both the Greek Tragedy and Sanskrit drama, the world views shaped the plots in different tone. In the world of Kalidasa, curse could be mitigated. So, even when Dushyanta forgot due to Dushyanta's curse, the ring could bring back recognition of Shakuntala. Whereas in the Greek world, the curse wrecked Oedipus' s life, no matter how far he tried to escape from the oracle. Oedipus' strive to escape, rather brought him closer to the fulfillment of the oracle.

From Volume 20 to 24 of JJCL, his article titled " The Technique of Oral Composition in the Ramayana", was published, part by part. While the first part elucidated the shift from one literary level to the other and the juxtaposed or intermingled levels of composition in The Ramayana, the second part was on how 'maha compounds' with metrical patterns, use of dhimat, tejas, cetas, ojas, adjectives ending in –in, and compounds ending with atman were used. The profuse use of patronymics were discussed too, by him. As continuation of the article, in the 23rd Volume, with examples from the Sanskrit Ramayana, he discussed the metrical patterns and compounds used by the bards, whereas in 24th Volume, he concluded how despite the problems faced by traditional bards, with the traditional formulae consisting verbal expressions and roots, the adjectival or adverbial expression enhanced the narrative quality of the adikavya.

== Bibliography ==
=== Primary bibliography ===
- "Religious Symbolism in the Kausitaki Upanisad". Baroda Journal of the Oriental Institute (1951).
- "A Pioneer of Neo-Hinduism: Bankim C. Chatterjee". Indica, IHRI Commemoration Volume. Bombay: St. Xavier's College, 1953.
- "The Gospel and Modern Indian Thought". Lumen Vitae (Brussels) (1953).
- A Sanskrit Manual for High Schools. 2 parts. Calcutta, St. Xavier's College, 1953.
- "Music Indian and Western". The Annual Souvenir of 1958. Calcutta: Sarat Bose Academy, 1958.
- Where We All Meet: A Dialogue. Light of the East Series, no. 51, Calcutta: Catholic Orphan Press, 1957.
- "Indian and Greek Epic". Quest (April 1958).
- Gan Kara Nava Git: A Bengali Hymn Book. Calcutta: Shanti Bhavan, 1963.
- Liturgy of Holy Week. [See R. De Smet, "Foreword", Religious Hinduism: A Presentation and Appraisal, 3rd rev. edition, ed. R. De Smet and J. Neuner (Allahabad: St Paul Publications, 1968) 2.]
- "The Eucharist and the Industrialization". India and the Eucharist. Ed. Bede Griffiths et al. (Ernakulam: Lumen Institute, 1964) 61–70.
- "General Historical Survey". Religious Hinduism: A Presentation and Appraisal. 3rd rev. edition. Ed. R. De Smet and J. Neuner. Allahabad: St Paul Publications, 1968. 23–30.
- "Sacred Books and Religious Literature". Religious Hinduism: A Presentation and Appraisal. 3rd rev. edition. Ed. R. De Smet and J. Neuner. Allahabad: St Paul Publications, 1968. 31–40.
- "Hindu Ethics: 1. General Ethics". Religious Hinduism: A Presentation and Appraisal. 3rd rev. edition. Ed. R. De Smet and J. Neuner. Allahabad: St Paul Publications, 1968. 108–116.
- "Hindu Ethics: 2. Special Ethics (Caste, Āśramas, etc)." Religious Hinduism: A Presentation and Appraisal. 3rd rev. edition. Ed. R. De Smet and J. Neuner. Allahabad: St Paul Publications, 1968. 117–125.
- "Rituals and Worship". Religious Hinduism: A Presentation and Appraisal. 3rd rev. edition. Ed. R. De Smet and J. Neuner. Allahabad: St Paul Publications, 1968. 154–162.
- "Hindu Saṃskāras". Religious Hinduism: A Presentation and Appraisal. 3rd rev. edition. Ed. R. De Smet and J. Neuner. Allahabad: St Paul Publications, 1968. 163–171.
- "The Mahābhārata". Religious Hinduism: A Presentation and Appraisal. 3rd rev. edition. Ed. R. De Smet and J. Neuner. Allahabad: St Paul Publications, 1968. 215–224.
- "Nineteenth Century Reform Movements". Religious Hinduism: A Presentation and Appraisal. 3rd rev. edition. Ed. R. De Smet and J. Neuner. Allahabad: St Paul Publications, 1968. 276–286.
- "The Present Situation". [In collaboration with P. Fallon.] Religious Hinduism: A Presentation and Appraisal. 3rd rev. edition. Ed. R. De Smet and J. Neuner. Allahabad: St Paul Publications, 1968. 308–320.
- Introduction to Upanisads. Monograph. Pune: Papal Seminary, 1965.
- The Mystery of Man. Calcutta, Xavier Publication, 1967.
- Virgil’s Aeneid. Translated into Bengali. Calcutta, Jadavpur University, 1972.
- Kalidasa’s Raghuvamsa. Translated into English. Calcutta, Writer's Workshop, 1972.
- Seven Theban Tragedies. Translated from the Greek to Bengali. Calcutta, Jadavpur University, 1974.
- Rama and the Bards: Epic Memory in the Ramayana. Calcutta: Writer's Workshop, 1975.
- "Homo Viator". The Visvabharati Quarterly (Calcutta) 41/1-4 (1975–76) 1–17.
- "The Curse in Oedipus Rex and Abhijnanasakuntalam". Jadavpur Journal of Comparative Literature 18–19 (1980–81) 1–12.
- "The Technique of Oral Composition in the Ramayana". Jadavpur Journal of Comparative Literature 21 (1983) 1–21.
- "The Technique of Oral Composition in the Ramayana". (contd.) Jadavpur Journal of Comparative Literature 22 (1984).
- "Hindu Ethics: 1. General Ethics". Religious Hinduism. 4th rev. edition. Ed. R. De Smet and J. Neuner. Mumbai: St Pauls, 1997. 149–158.
- "Hindu Ethics: 2. Special Ethics (Castes, Āṣramas, etc.)." Religious Hinduism. 4th rev. edition. Ed. R. De Smet and J. Neuner. Mumbai: St Pauls, 1997. 159–169.
- "Rituals and Worship". Religious Hinduism. 4th rev. edition. Ed. R. De Smet and J. Neuner. Mumbai: St Pauls, 1997. 200–209.
- "The Hindu Saṃskāras". Religious Hinduism. 4th rev. edition. Ed. R. De Smet and J. Neuner. Mumbai: St Pauls, 1997. 210–219.
- "The Mahābhārata". Religious Hinduism. 4th rev. edition. Ed. R. De Smet and J. Neuner. Mumbai: St Pauls, 1997. 267–278.
- "Reform Movements of Modern India". Religious Hinduism. 4th rev. edition. Ed. R. De Smet and J. Neuner. Mumbai: St Pauls, 1997. 343–356.
