= Association of Christian Philosophers of India =

The Association of Christian Philosophers of India (ACPI) was founded in 1976 in Aluva, Kerala, India, inspired by Dr Richard De Smet, SJ, and initiated by Dr Albert Nambiaparambil, CMI.

== Activities ==
The chief activity is the annual meeting, held at different places in India, with a topic chosen a year in advance and papers presented largely by the members. Since 2000, the association has begun publishing the proceedings of its annual meetings (see below, Publications). Earlier, papers were published through Journal of Dharma, Divyadaan: Journal of Philosophy and Education, or other such journals.

Originally, the association would meet at the same venue as the Indian Philosophical Congress; members would join the IPC, and then hold their own meetings. Eventually, the decision was made to hold meetings independently of the IPC.

Membership is open to any Christian holding a doctorate or a master's degree in philosophy or related subjects, or even holding a teaching post in some institute of higher learning.

A recent major activity was the publication of the ACPI Encyclopedia of Philosophy.

== Publications ==
- The Postmodern ... A Siege of the Citadel of Reason
- Faith, Reason, Science: Philosophical Reflections with Special Reference to 'Fides et Ratio'. Ed. Varghese Manimala. Delhi: Media House, 2003.
- The Constitution of India: A Philosophical Review. Ed. George Panthanmackel
- Truth, Power, Money: A Postmodern Reading
- Philosophical Methods: Through the Prevalent to a Relevant
- Subaltern Perspectives: Philosophizing in Context
- Pluralism of Pluralism: A Pluralistic Probe into Philosophizing
- Romancing the Sacred: Towards an Indian Christian Philosophy of Religion
- Culture as Gift and Task: Philosophical Reflections in the Indian Context. Ed. Keith D'Souza
- Enigma of Indian Tribal Life and Culture: Philosophical Investigations. Ed. Vincent Aind
- Violence and its Victims: A Challenge to Philosophizing in the Indian Context. Ed. Ivo Coelho. Bangalore: Asian Trading Corporation, 2010.
- Tradition and Innovation: Philosophy of Rootedness and Openness. Ed. Saju Chacklackal. Bangalore: Asian Trading Corporation, 2011.

In 2010, the association published the ACPI Encyclopedia of Philosophy, eds Johnson J. Puthenpurackal and George Panthanmackel. Bangalore: Asian Trading Corporation, 2010.
