= Pierre Fallon =

Belgian Jesuit priest, missionary in India and professor

Reverend Pierre Fallon
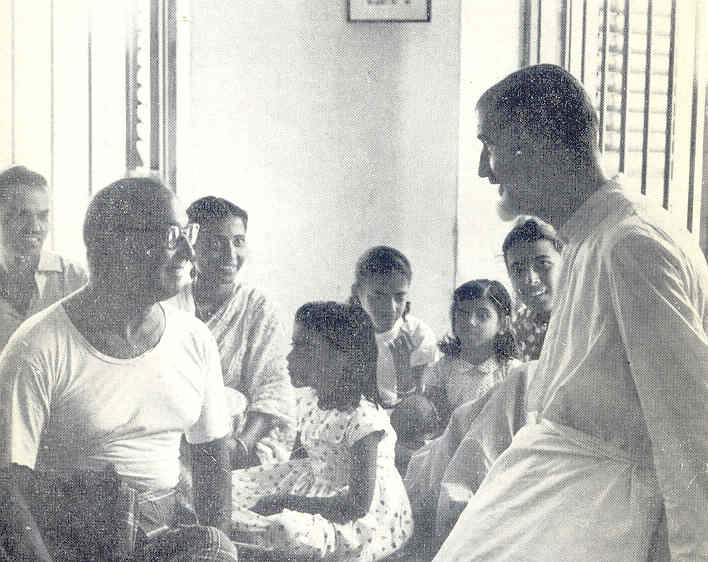
- Rev. Pierre Fallon with a Bengali family of Calcutta
- Born: 24 September 1912; Namur, Belgium
- Died: 20 September 1985 (aged 72); Calcutta (now Kolkata), West Bengal, India
- Occupation: Professor French literature at the University of Calcutta
- Years active: 1935 -1985
- Known for: Missionary in India

Pierre Fallon (24 September 1912, Namur, Belgium - 20 September 1985, Calcutta, India) was a Belgian Jesuit priest, missionary in India, Professor of French literature at the University of Calcutta. In 1950 he founded the dialogue centre Shanti Bhavan (with Robert Antoine) in Calcutta; in 1960 the similar Shanti Sadan in North Calcutta; and later took charge of Shanti Nir.

== Education ==
Fallon entered the Society of Jesus in 1930, and came to Calcutta, India in 1935. He obtained Indian citizenship in 1950. He held a licentiate in Indology from the University of Louvain, a licentiate in philosophy, a licentiate in theology, and was the first Jesuit to obtain an MA in Bengali philology from Calcutta University.

== Work ==
He founded Shanti Bhavan with Robert Antoine in 1950, and contributed much to make it a living centre of intercultural and interfaith dialogue.

Ten years later he founded a similar Shanti Sadan in a much poorer and crowded area of North Calcutta, and later, after the sudden death of Louis Winckelmans took charge of Shanti Nir (1978), in the southern suburbs of the city. He was an educationist of renown, but also took charge of charitable work for the famine-stricken and refugees.

For 25 years he was a professor of French literature at the University of Calcutta, where he also became a member of the senate and the academic council. He also taught at St. Xavier's College, Calcutta. He was known as a public orator in Bengali, French and English. However much of his work focused on translating Biblical and liturgical texts into Bengali for Christian. His Glossary of Bengali Religious Terms (1945) contributed to this effort. He was also involved in interfaith dialogue. The last words he typed before his fatal heart attack were: "Dialogue with Persons of Other Faiths..." That was in September 1985: Pierre Fallon was in fact preparing a text for the forthcoming visit of John-Paul II in Calcutta (February 1986).

== Bibliography ==
=== Primary bibliography ===
- Christianity in Bengal in Studies in the Bengal Renaissance edited by Atulchandra Gupta (1958), revised and enlarged by Jagannath Chakavorty, Jadavpur, Calcutta: National Council of Education, 1977.
- Glossary of Bengali Religious Terms. [See R. De Smet, "Foreword", Religious Hinduism, 4th rev. edition, ed. R. De Smet and J. Neuner (Mumbai: St Pauls, 1997) 17–18.]
- New Testament. Translation into Bengali. [See R. De Smet, "Foreword", Religious Hinduism, 4th rev. edition, ed. R. De Smet and J. Neuner (Mumbai: St Pauls, 1997) 17–18.]
- Mass Ritual. Translation into Bengali. [See R. De Smet, "Foreword", Religious Hinduism, 4th rev. edition, ed. R. De Smet and J. Neuner (Mumbai: St Pauls, 1997) 17–18.]
- "Introduction: A Christian Approach to Non-Christian Religions". Religious Hinduism: A Presentation and Appraisal. 3rd rev. edition. Ed. R. De Smet and J. Neuner. Allahabad: St Paul Publications, 1968. 15–22.
- "God in Hinduism: Brahman, Paramātman and Bhagavān". Religious Hinduism: A Presentation and Appraisal. 3rd rev. edition. Ed. R. De Smet and J. Neuner. Allahabad: St Paul Publications, 1968. 73–81.
- "The Gods of Hinduism". Religious Hinduism: A Presentation and Appraisal. 3rd rev. edition. Ed. R. De Smet and J. Neuner. Allahabad: St Paul Publications, 1968. 82–94.
- "Image Worship". Religious Hinduism: A Presentation and Appraisal. 3rd rev. edition. Ed. R. De Smet and J. Neuner. Allahabad: St Paul Publications, 1968. 172–182.
- "Bhagavata Purana and Bhakti Currents". Religious Hinduism: A Presentation and Appraisal. 3rd rev. edition. Ed. R. De Smet and J. Neuner. Allahabad: St Paul Publications, 1968. 236–245.
- "Doctrinal Background of the Bhakti Spirituality". Religious Hinduism: A Presentation and Appraisal. 3rd rev. edition. Ed. R. De Smet and J. Neuner. Allahabad: St Paul Publications, 1968. 246–254.
- "Ramakrishna, Vivekananda and Radhakrishnan". Religious Hinduism: A Presentation and Appraisal. 3rd rev. edition. Ed. R. De Smet and J. Neuner. Allahabad: St Paul Publications, 1968. 287–295.
- "The Present Situation". (In collaboration with R. Antoine.) Religious Hinduism: A Presentation and Appraisal. 3rd rev. edition. Ed. R. De Smet and J. Neuner. Allahabad: St Paul Publications, 1968. 308–320.
- "Introduction: A Christian Approach to Religious Hinduism". Religious Hinduism. 4th rev. edition, ed. R. De Smet and J. Neuner. Mumbai: St Pauls, 1997. 23–30.
- "God in Hinduism: Brahman, Paramātman, Īśvara and Bhagavān". Religious Hinduism. 4th rev. edition. Ed. R. De Smet and J. Neuner. Mumbai: St Pauls, 1997. 108–116.
- "The Gods of Hinduism". Religious Hinduism. 4th rev. edition. Ed. R. De Smet and J. Neuner. Mumbai: St Pauls, 1997. 117–129.
- "Image Worship". Religious Hinduism. 4th rev. edition. Ed. R. De Smet and J. Neuner. Mumbai: St Pauls, 1997. 220–230.
- Bhāgavata Purāṇa and the Great Bhakti Currents". Religious Hinduism. 4th rev. edition. Ed. R. De Smet and J. Neuner. Mumbai: St Pauls, 1997. 292–302.
- "Doctrinal Background of the Bhakti Spirituality". Religious Hinduism. 4th rev. edition. Ed. R. De Smet and J. Neuner. Mumbai: St Pauls, 1997. 303–313.
- "Śrī Rāmakrishna, Swāmi Vivekānanda and Sarvepalli Rādhākrishnan". Religious Hinduism. 4th rev. edition. Ed. R. De Smet and J. Neuner. Mumbai: St Pauls, 1997. 357–374.
