= Jnana Deepa, Institute of Philosophy and Theology =

- Motto: "The seer sees the Self through his/her own self" (Paśyaty-ātmānam-ātmanā; पश्यत्यात्मानमात्मना Mahabharata 12.242.10ab)
- Type: Ecclesiastical Institute of Higher Education
- Established: 1893 at Kandy, Sri Lanka (133 years ago); 1955 moved to Pune, India (71 years ago)
- Affiliations: Roman Catholic, Jesuit
- President: Fr. Dollichan Kollareth, SJ
- Vice-Chancellor: Fr. Stany D'Souza, SJ
- Faculty: 60
- Students: 900
- Location: Pune, Maharashtra, India; 18.5236°N 73.8478°E
- Campus: Urban: Ramwadi, Pune
- Website: jdv.edu.in

Jnana Deepa (JD), Institute for Philosophy and Theology is located at Pune, India. It is the academic component of Papal Seminary, Founded by Pope Leo XIII with the motto “Filii tui India administri tibi salutis” in Kandy (Sri Lanka) in 1893, it was transferred to Pune (India) in 1955, being joined to the Jesuit faculty of Theology 'De Nobili College'. Catering primarily to the formation of catholic priests it is also open to Catholic faithful and religious orders it is entrusted by the Holy See to the Society of Jesus for training Catholic leaders.

== History ==
A catholic seminary was founded in 1893 in the hills of Kandy Ceylon. by the Apostolic Delegate to India, Mgr Lasdislaus Zaleski and entrusted to the Belgian Jesuits, led by Fr Sylvain Grosjean. This was in response to the letter Ad extremas of Pope Leo XIII calling for the establishment of institutes for the training of the local clergy. Ceylon (Sri Lanka), with India and Burma were then part of the British Empire.

After the Independence of India, it became increasingly difficult for Indian citizens to go to Sri Lanka for studies. In 1955, the Papal Seminary along with its Athenaeum moved to Pune, Maharashtra (India), near the already existing Jesuit Theologate 'De Nobili College'.

In the wake of Vatican II the Papal Seminary adopted the Indian name 'Jnana Deepa' (1972). In 2015 it celebrated its diamond jubilee of transfer to Pune. It continues to offer philosophy and theology courses for those studying for the Catholic priesthood. It also serves as an intellectual centre for the Catholic Church in India, having taken a leading role in promoting inculturation since the 1970s. Its "Department of Indian Studies" brings "Indian" insights to the Christian faith.

== Programs ==
In the 1970s and 1980s JD was the driving force for inculturation, inter-religious dialog, and "liberation theology" for the Indian church. Personalities like Richard De Smet, George Lobo, and George-Soares Prabhu enabled JD to lead a Catholic movement toward the concerns of the poor and marginalised in Indian society. Sara Grant taught philosophy and theology at the institute.

JD has continued in its pioneering activities in the Indian catholic church, for more than a decade pursuing dialog between science and religion. It offers a Licentiate in Science and Religion (MSPR). More practical, contextual studies in sacred scripture have seen a revival, with the addition of a Licentiate programs in contextual spirituality. Diploma and Licentiate Programme in Ignatian Spirituality began in the academic year 2016–17. Also, a pastoral management course was instituted for the administrative and service sector. It publishes an interdisciplinary quarterly, Jnanadeepa: Pune Journal of Religious Studies.

== Eminent faculty ==
- Richard De Smet, Indology. See the Memorial Lecture
- Jean de Marneffe, Systematic Philosophy. See the Memorial Lecture
- George Soares-Prabhu, Sacred scriptures (New Testament)
- John Vattanky, Indology, Navya Nyaya philosophy
- Kurien Kunnumpuram, Ecclesiology
- Cyril Desbruslais, Systematic Philosophy, Philosophy of liberation
- Francis Pereira, Sacred Scripture
- Kuruvilla Pandikattu, Anthropology, Science-Religion
- Job Kozhamthadam, Science-Religion Dialogue

== See also ==
- List of Jesuit sites
