= Ampitiya =

Ampitiya අම්පිටිය
- Suburb
- Interactive map of Ampitiya
- Country: Sri Lanka
- Province: Central Province
- District: Kandy District
- Nearest City: Kandy

Government
  - Type: Municipal Council
  - Body: Kandy Municipal Council
  - Village Council: Gangawata Korale
- Time zone: UTC+5:30 (Sri Lanka Standard Time)

Ampitiya (Sinhala: අම්පිටිය) is a suburb of the city of Kandy, Sri Lanka. It is located within the country's Central Province.

Ampitiya is approximately 3 miles from the Kandy city centre.

Ampitiya is administratively divided into the two sections of Ampitiya north and Ampitiya South.

== Points of interest ==
Divurum Bodhi Viharaya is a well-known Buddhist temple located in Ampitiya.

== See also ==
- List of towns in Central Province, Sri Lanka
