= Richard De Smet =

Belgian Jesuit priest, missionary in India and Indologist

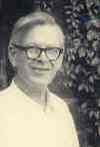
Father Richard De Smet

Richard De Smet (16 April 1916 – 2 March 1997) was a Belgian Jesuit priest, and missionary in India. As Indologist he became a renowned Sankara specialist.

== Life ==
Born at Montignies-sur-Sambre, near Charleroi in Belgium, he came to India as a young Jesuit student of theology in 1946. Upon completion of his theological studies, he studied Sanskrit in Calcutta under Georges Dandoy, Pierre Fallon and Robert Antoine, all members of the so-called "Calcutta School" of Jesuit Indologists.

Provoked by a talk by Dr S. Radhakrishnan at a meeting of the Indian Philosophical Congress at Calcutta in 1950, where Radhakrishnan claimed that Sankara was a purely rational philosopher, De Smet decided to show that he was, instead, a srutivadin, a theologian who subordinated reason to the revealed (apauruṣeyā) scripture. De Smet went on to do his doctorate on The Theological Method of Samkara, completing it at the Gregorian University, Rome, in 1953. Though he never got round to publishing this thesis, it became famous among Indologists and there are hundreds of copies in circulation.

Returning to India in March 1954, De Smet began to teach at the newly opened centre for philosophical studies of the Jesuits at De Nobili College, Pune. At first he was assigned courses traditional in Roman Catholic seminaries (which he taught in Latin, also composing Guidelines for students): Introduction to Philosophy + Minor Logic; General Metaphysics: Rational Theology (which he subtitled Brahma Jijnasa), Special Questions of Metaphysics. By 1968, he was able to open a special section for Indian Studies in his institute, by now renamed Jnana-Deepa Vidyapeeth (JDV). Over the years 1968–75, he composed his Guidelines in Indian Philosophy, cyclostyled notes for students beginning with the Ancient Indian Vedic period and going up to Sankara.

In the meantime, right from 1954 De Smet began attending various meetings of Indologists and Indian Philosophers: the Indian Philosophical Congress, the Poona Philosophy Association, the Bombay Philosophy Union, the newly formed Indian Philosophical Association. After an initially suspicious reception (a Dr Chubb roundly accused him of excessive missionary zeal at the Kandy session of the Indian Philosophical Congress in 1954), his competence and self-possession won the day and he soon found himself being invited to lecture or give courses at universities and colleges across the country. He was also asked to collaborate with the Marathi Encyclopedia of Philosophy (Marathi Tattvajnana Mahakosa) project in Pune, and went on to become the most prolific contributor with a total of 68 articles. Besides these, he wrote some 128 entries for Verbo: Enciclopedia Luso-Brasileira de Cultura, of which some 47 are still to be found in the latest edition, and 2 entries for the Telugu Encyclopedia.

De Smet engaged not only in dialogue not only with academics and scholars but also with religious people. He was a frequent invitee to the Sivananda Ashram at Rishikesh, where he would lecture on Sankara and other topics, but also, on request, about Jesus and Christianity. He visited the Ramakrishna missions in various parts of the country, and also the Aurobindo Ashram at Pondicherry. He had contacts with the Caitanya Vaisnava movement at Vrindavan. Invited by the Sikhs to the four hundredth anniversary celebrations of their founder, he spoke about Guru Nanak and Jesus Christ. Despite not being an expert in Islam, he found himself being invited also by Muslims of the Jamia Millia University in Delhi. He spoke often to the Jains of Pune and wrote for their The Voice of Ahinsa. He participated in the pro-dialogue meetings organized by Swami Abhishiktananda (the French Benedictine monk Dom Henri Le Saux) under the patronage of the Swiss Ambassador, J.-A. Cuttat. He was invited for lectures on Hinduism to the Kurisumala Ashram founded by Francis Acharya (Fr Francis Mahieu) at Vagamon, Kerala. He also engaged willingly with Christians of other denominations, teaching in their universities and seminaries, participating in their conferences, meetings and seminars, and even giving retreats to staff and students, far before the word ecumenism became popular in the Catholic Church.

De Smet will be remembered for two major contributions to Indological scholarship. The first was his fresh interpretation of Sankara as a non-dualist realist rather than a world-denying illusionist. This interpretation hinged on his discovery, or rather reinforcement of Olivier Lacombe's discovery, of the fact that Sankara used analogical predication in expounding the meaning of the mahāvākyas (great sentences) of the Upanisads such as Tat-tvam-asi and Satyam Jnanam Anantam Brahma. The world is neither atyanta Sat like Brahman, nor is it atyanta Asat like the son of a barren woman. It is, instead, a reality that is completely and ontologically dependent on Brahman. And once the notion of creation is purified of anthropomorphism, it is possible to speak of Brahman as creator and cause of the world, without detriment to its oneness, immutability, perfection and freedom. The second was his demonstration that, given the original meaning of 'person' which was coined by Christian theologians to speak precisely of the divine mysteries of the Trinity and the Incarnation, the supreme Brahman (Nirguna Brahman), far from being impersonal, is indeed personal in the highest and supreme sense of the term.

Richard De Smet died in Brussels, Belgium on 2 March 1997. Julius J. Lipner, professor at Cambridge, student and friend of De Smet, called him one of the "unsung pioneers" of the interpretation of Indian thought, and his death "the end of an era in the annals of Indological scholarship in India," the era of "the foreign missionary scholar who made India a home over many years, loved its peoples and its cultures, empathetically studied rich strands of its religious inheritance, and sought in a spirit of enlightened appreciation to enter into a dialogue at depth." Bradley J. Malkovsky calls him "one of the twentieth century's giants in Hindu-Christian dialogue" and "one of the foremost authorities in the twentieth century on the Hindu theologian Samkara."

== Writings ==
Early in his career, De Smet made the option to meet requests arising from his dialogical activity inside India rather than produce pieces of Indological research. He also decided to give preference to the requests of Hindus, Jains, Sikhs, Muslims, etc. over those of Christians. As a consequence, most of his production consisted of occasional pieces in a wide variety of relatively inaccessible Indian publications. This also resulted in his hardly being known outside India. Even in India, the scattered nature of his output has resulted in his largely being ignored in Christian theological circles.

Among his few books are the following:

- Philosophical Activity in Pakistan. Pakistan Philosophical Congress Series. Lahore, 1961.
- Hinduismus und Christentum (ed. and contributor). Vienna: Herder, 1962.
- Religious Hinduism (ed., with J. Neuner, and contributor). Allahabad: St. Paul Publications, 1964, 1968, 1997.
- La quête de l’Éternel; approches chrétiennes de l’hindouisme, Museum Lessianum, Section missiologique, no. 48. Paris: Desclee de Brouwer, 1967.
- Brahman and Person: Essays by Richard De Smet. Ed. Ivo Coelho. Delhi: Motilal Banarsidass, 2010.
- Understanding Sankara: Essays by Richard De Smet. Ed. Ivo Coelho. Delhi: Motilal Banarsidass, 2013.

Among his articles:

- "Indiens Beitrag zur allgemeine Metaphysik". [Indian Contribution to General Metaphysics.] Kairos (Salzburg) 3/4 (1961) 161–182.
- "Patterns and Theories of Causality". Philosophy Today 9/2-4 (1965) 134–146.
- "Some Governing Principles in Indian Philosophy.” Philosophy Today 9/3-4 (1965) 192–199.
- "Māyā or Ajñāna?” Indian Philosophical Annual 2 (1966) 220–225.
- "Zum indischen Menschenbild". [Concerning the Indian View of Man.] Kairos (Salzburg) 8/3-4 (1966) 197–202.
- "The Indian Renaissance: Hindu Philosophy in English". International Philosophical Quarterly 8/1 (1968) 5–37.
- "Śaṅkara and Aquinas on Liberation (Mukti).” Indian Philosophical Annual 5 (University of Madras) (1969) 239–247.
- "The Law of Karma: A Critical Examination". Indian Ecclesiastical Studies 8/3 (1969) 181–187.
- "Śaṅkara and Aquinas on Creation". Indian Philosophical Annual 6 (1970) 112–118.
- "The Indian Understanding of Man". Indian Ecclesiastical Studies 10/3 (1971) 169–178.
- "Is the Concept of 'Person' Suitable in Vedanta?” Indian Ecclesiastical Studies 12/3 (1973) 155–162.
- "Advaitavada and Christianity". Bulletin of the Secretariate for Non-Christians 23–24 (1973) 143–146.
- "Suggestions for an Indian Dialogical Theology". Bangalore Theological Forum 5/1 (1973) 74–80.
- "Towards an Indian View of the Person". Contemporary Indian Philosophy. Series II. Muirhead Library of Philosophy. Ed. M. Chatterjee. London: Allen and Unwin, 1974. 51–75.
- "Pathways for Evangelization in India". Lumen Vitae 29/3 (1974) 403–417.
- "The Open Person and the Closed Individual". Journal of the Philosophical Association 15/47 (1974).
- "The Status of the Scriptures in the 'Holy History' of India". Research Seminar on Non-Biblical Scriptures. Ed. D.S. Amalorpavadass. Bangalore: NBCLC, 1974. 280–299.
- "A Copernican Reversal: The Gītākāra’s Reformulation of Karma". Philosophy East and West 27/1 (1977) 53–63.
- A Short History of the Person. Abstracts from Indian Philosophical Quarterly 4/1 (Oct. 1976), 4/2 (Apr. 1977) and 2/4 (July 1975). Poona: University of Poona, 1977.
- "The Philosophers' Transition from Atheism to Theism from the Fourth to the Eleventh Century A.D". Challenges of Societies in Transition. Ed. M. Barnabas, P.S. Jacob and S.K. Hulbe. New Delhi: Macmillan, 1978. 310–338.
- "Origin: Creation and Emanation". Indian Theological Studies 15/3 (1978) 266–279.
- "The Indian Ascertainment of the Godhead (from the Vedas to Udayanācārya).” Indica 16/1 (1979) 59–73.
- "The Integrative Doctrine of God in the Bhagavad-Gītā". Prayer and Contemplation. Ed. C.M. Vadakkekara. Bangalore: Asian Trading Corporation, 1980. 139–158.
- "Forward Steps in Śaṅkara Research". (Pratap Seth Endowment Lecture on Śaṅkara Vedānta: Indian Philosophical Congress, 62nd session, 6–9 June 1987, University of Kashmir, Srinagar.) Darshana International (Moradabad, India) 26/3 (1987) 33–46.
- "Dynamics of Hinduism and Hindu-Christian Dialogue". Communio: International Catholic Review 15 (Winter 1988) 436–450.
- "Radhakrishnan’s Interpretation of Śaṅkara". Radhakrishnan Centenary Volume. Ed. G. Parthasarathi and D.P. Chattopadhyaya. Delhi: Oxford University Press, 1989. 53–70.
- "Radhakrishnan’s Second Presentation of Śaṅkara’s Teaching". Prajña: Kashi Hindu Vishvavidyalaya Patrika (Special issue for S.R.'s Centenary smṛti) 34 (1989) 83–96.

== Festschrifts ==
- Kozhamthadam, Job, ed. Interrelations and Interpretation: Philosophical Reflections on Science, Religion and Hermeneutics in Honour of Richard De Smet, S.J. and Jean de Marneffe, S.J. New Delhi: Intercultural Publications, 1997.
- Malkovsky, Bradley J., ed. New Perspectives in Advaita Vedanta: Essays in Commemoration of Professor Richard De Smet, SJ. Leiden / Boston / Köln: Brill, 2000.

== Secondary literature ==
- Coelho, Ivo. "Fr. Richard V. De Smet (1916–97): Reminiscences". Divyadaan: Journal of Philosophy and Education 8/1 (1997) 3–15.
- Coelho, Ivo. "Introduction". Brahman and Person: Essays by Richard De Smet. Ed. Ivo Coelho. Delhi: Motilal Banarsidass, 2010. 7–24.
- Coelho, Ivo. "De Smet, Richard." ACPI Encyclopedia of Philosophy. Ed. Johnson J. Puthenpurackal. Bangalore: ATC Publications, 2010. 1:382–385.
- Coelho, Ivo. "Richard V. De Smet, SJ (1916–1997): A Life. Part I: The Student and the Teacher". Mission Today 13/3 (2011) 235–260.
- Coelho, Ivo. "Richard V. De Smet, SJ (1916–1997): A Life. II: The Scholar". Mission Today 13/4 (2011) 367–378.
- Coelho, Ivo. "Richard V. De Smet, SJ (1916–1997): A Life. III: The Man of Dialogue". Mission Today. Forthcoming.
- Coelho, Ivo. "Richard V. De Smet, SJ (1916–1997): A Life." Divyadaan: Journal of Philosophy and Education 23/1 (2012). Forthcoming.
- Grant, Sara. Śaṅkarācārya’s Concept of Relation. Delhi: Motilal Banarsidass, 1999.
- Lipner, Julius. "Śaṁkara on Metaphor with reference to Gītā 13.12–18". Indian Philosophy of Religion. Ed. R.W. Perrett. Kluwer Academic Publishers, 1989.
- Lipner, Julius. "Śaṃkara on satyaṃ jñānam anantaṃ brahma (TaiUp. 2.1.1).” Relativism, Suffering and Beyond: Essays in Memory of Bimal K. Matilal. Ed. P. Bilimoria and J.N. Mohanty. Delhi: Oxford University Press, 1997.
- Malkovsky, Bradley J. "The Personhood of Śaṃkara’s Para Brahman". The Journal of Religion 77 (1997) 541–562.
- Malkovsky, Bradley J. "Advaita Vedānta and Christian Faith". Journal of Ecumenical Studies 36/3-4 (1999) 397–422.
- Malkovsky, Bradley J. The Role of Divine Grace in the Soteriology of Śrī Śaṃkarācārya. Leiden / Boston / Köln: Brill, 2001.
- Satyanand, Joseph. Nimbārka: A Pre-Śaṁkara Vedāntin and His Philosophy. New Delhi: Munshiram Manoharlal, 1997.
- Vattanky, John. "Fr Richard De Smet, S.J.: Friend, Scholar, Man of Dialogue". Vidyajyoti: Journal of Theological Reflection 71/4 (April 2007) 245–261.

== De Smet-de Marneffe Annual Memorial Lectures ==
A memorial lecture is organized annually for the staff and students of The Faculty of Philosophy, Jnana-Deepa Vidyapeeth, Pune, India, in honour of their two stalwarts, Prof Richard De Smet and Jean de Marneffe, both Jesuits from Belgium.

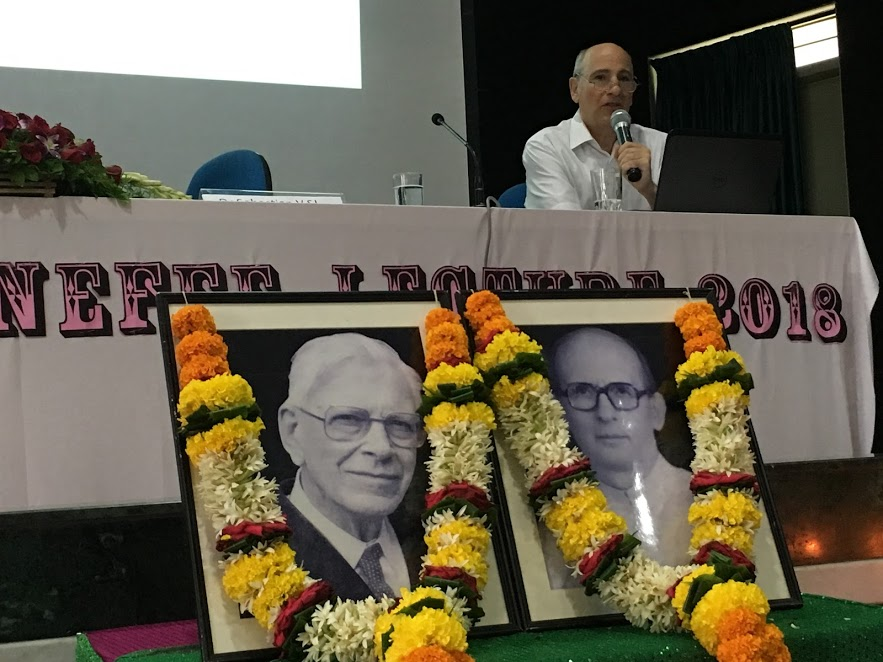
Lecture series on Richard De Smet and Jean de Marneffe

- 2005 Prof Winand Callewaert, University of Leuvein, on "New Age Literature and Upanisads."
- 2006 Prof Richard Sorabjee, University of Oxford, on "Self-Awareness and Morality."
- 2007 Prof Archana Barua, IIT, Gauhati, on "Philosophy: East-West Perspectives."
- 2008 Prof George F Mclean, Catholic University of America on "Contribution of Philosophy to the Growth of Civilizations: Eastern and Western Perspectives."
- 2009 Prof Francis Clooney, Center of World Religions, Harvard University on "Comparative Philosophy and the Future of Interreligious Learning."
- 2010 Lecture was given by Prof Dr. Ramachandra Pradhan, University of Hyderabad, on 21 January 2011. He talked on "The Contributions of Western Philosophy to the World Cultures and the Future of Philosophy".
- 2011 Lecture: "With and Beyond Plurality of Standpoints: Pluralization and the Sadhana of Multi-Valued Logic and Living" by Ananta Kumar Giri, Madras Institute of Development Studies, Chennai.
- 2012 Lecture: 15 June: "Thomas Berry's Contribution to Earth Theology: His Indebtedness to Teilhard, Yoga, Buddhism and Jung" by Christopher Key Chapple, Loyola Marymount University, USA
- 2013 This year the Memorial lecture is transformed into an international conference on "Themes and Issues in Eastern and Western Hermetical Traditions," held on 31 Jan–Feb 1, 2014, with 16 paper presentations.
- 2014 Lecture: 23 January 2015. Prof Sebastian Velassery, Panjab University on "Transcendence and the Transcendent: A Phenomenological Re-Thinking on Otherness" and "Apophasis as Negative Theology: Upanishads and Medieval Christianity."
- 2015 Lecture: 21–22 January 2016. International Conference on "Public Philosophy" with 15 papers. Chief Guest: Dr Deepak Tilak, VC, Tilak Maharashtra Vidyapeeth, Pune 41137, India.
- 2016 Lecture: 19 August 2016. Prof James Ponniah, University of Madras. "Religious Violence in South Asia: Exploring Convergences and Divergences Across Nations." The book Nishant Alphonse Irudayadason (ed) "Musings and Meanings: Hermeneutical Ripples ..." based on 2013 also released.
- 2017 Lecture: 8–9 December 2017. Prof Francis X D'Sa is keynote speaker. Theme: "Cosmotheandric Vision of Raimundo Panikkar." Other speaks: Mohan Doss SVD, George Joseph, Jose Nandhikkara CMI, Isaac Parackal OIC, Kuruvilla Pandikattu SJ, Johnson Puthenpurackal OFM Cap, Donald R Frohlich, Carlos Miguel Gómez-Rincon, Sebastian Velassery, EP Mathew. Chief Guest: George Pattery SJ. Proceedings published.
- 2018 Lecture: 6–7 July 2018. Prof Louis Caruana, SJ, Dean, Faculty of Philosophy, Gregorian University, is the keynote speaker: Theme is "Nature and Its Intrinsic Value."
- 2019 Lecture: 17–18 Jan 2020. "Humanization of Social Life," Two-day seminar. Resource Persons: Dr Donald Frohlich, St. Thomas University, Houston; Dr Barry Rodrigue, SSLA, Pune; Dr Sebastian Vallasery, Panjab University, Chandigarh; Dr Laxmikanta Padhi, University of North Bengal; Dr Vinay Kumar, Professor (Emeritus), Goa University; Dr Victor Ferrao, Rachol Seminary, Goa; Dr Job Kozhamthadam, Indian Institute of Science and Religion, Delhi; Dr Sooraj Pittappillil, Kottayam, Kerala; Dr Ginish Cheruparambil, Christ University, Lavasa, Pune; Dr Abhayankar Vishnu, Pune; Dr Roy Pereira, St. Xaviers' College, Mumbai; Dr Kamaladevi Kunkolienkar, PES’s College of Arts and Sciences, Farmgudi; Dr Lilly Pereira, Mater Dei, Goa; Dr Subhash Anand, Udaipur; Dr Paul Thelakat, Light of Truth, Ernakulam; Dr Shashikala Gurpur, Dean, Symbiosis Law School, Pune; Nishant Irudayadason, JDV, Pune; Kuruvilla Pandikattu, JDV, Pune.
