= Veliyannoor =

- suburb
- Country: India
- State: Kerala
- District: Kottayam

Government
  - Type: Panchayat Raj
  - Body: Grama Panchayat

Population (2011)
  - Total: 9,917

Languages
  - Official: Malayalam, English
- Time zone: UTC+5:30 (IST)
- Vehicle registration: KL-67

Veliyannoor is a village in Kottayam district in the state of Kerala, India.

== Demographics ==
As of 2011 India census, Veliyannoor had a population of 9917 with 4942 males and 4975 females.
