= Rahner =

Rahner may refer to:

- Helmut Rahner (born 1971), German soccer player
- Hugo Rahner (1900–1968), German Jesuit theologian
- Karl Rahner (1904–1984), German Jesuit theologian
- Raymond M. Rahner, better known as Ray Rayner (1919–2004), American television presenter
- Wilhelmina Beatrice Rahner, better known as Bess Houdini (1876–1943), stage assistant and wife of Harry Houdini

== See also ==
- Rayner
