= The Light of the East =

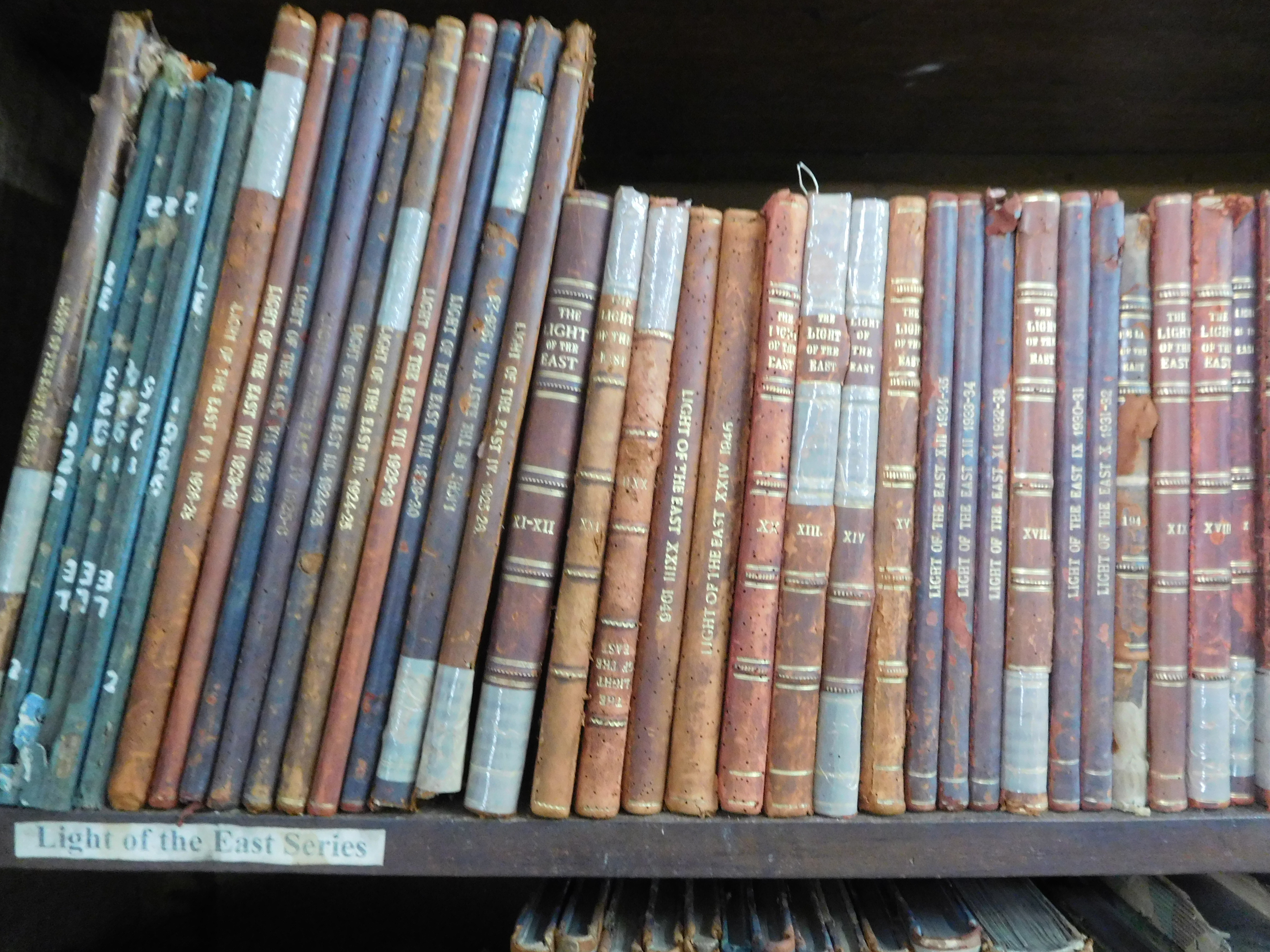
Light of the East collection

The Light of the East was a monthly review founded in 1922 at Calcutta by Georges Dandoy, SJ (1882-1962) and Pierre Johanns, SJ. Dandoy was the chief editor. The monthly ceased publication in 1934.

== Founding and objective ==
Dandoy and Johanns were young Jesuits, newly arrived in India, when they met Brahmachari Animananda, disciple of Brahmobandhav Upadhyay. Animananda encouraged them in their desire to begin a journal that would carry on the spirit of inquiry initiated by Upadhyay. P. Turmes reports that Animananda's face brightened up when the two Jesuits laid before him the proposal for a journal that would present Christ to India in a way adapted to her mentality and culture.

Both Dandoy and Johanns contributed regularly to the review. Several of Johanns' contributions were later published in book form under the title To Christ to the Vedanta. Other contributors included members of the so-called Calcutta School of Indology.

== Holdings ==
The Indian Institute of the University of Oxford has an incomplete set. The Yale University Library has a complete set on microfilm.

== Bibliography ==
Sean Doyle, Synthesizing the Vedanta: The Theology of Pierre Johanns, S.J. Oxford: P. Lang, 2006.

Sean Doyle, Light of the East: the Calcutta School of Jesuit Indology on Hindu Advaita Non-Dualism. Boston College: Jesuit Sources, 2026.
