= Dandoy =

Dandoy is a surname. Notable people with the surname include:

- Aimé Dandoy, founder of the Belgian National Movement World War II resistance group in 1940
- Georges Dandoy (1882–1962), Belgian Jesuit priest, theologian, and Indologist
- Gilliam Dandoy (fl. 1640–1654), Flemish painter and draughtsman
