= Guilliam =

Guilliam is a given name. Notable people with the name include:

- Guilliam van Deynum (c. 1575–after 1624), Flemish painter, illuminator and miniaturist
- Guilliam du Gardijn (1595/1596–1647/1657), Dutch painter
- Guilliam Visagie (c. 1751–after 1793), Cape Colony trekboer
