= Gerard van Deynen =

Dutch painter

Gerard van Deynen (fl. 1665 – after 1673), was a Dutch painter, who was enrolled in the Guild of Saint Luke of The Hague from 1665 to 1673.

Gerard van Deynen is sometimes confused with G. van Deynum (also sometimes referred to as Guilliam van Deynum), a still life painter who worked in Antwerp.
