= Calcutta School of Indology =

The Calcutta School of Indology (also known as the 'Bengal School' of Indology) consists of a group of Jesuit missionary scholars based mostly in Calcutta and including William Wallace, SJ (1863–1922), Pierre Johanns (1882–1955), Georges Dandoy, Joseph Putz, Joseph Bayart, Robert Antoine, Camille Bulcke, Michael Ledrus, Pierre Fallon and Jan Feys. They were joined in their efforts by Animananda, a disciple of Upadhyaya.

== History ==
The group drew its inspiration from Brahmobandhav Upadhyaya's efforts to think out and practice an original and fresh encounter of Christianity and Hinduism. The originator of this vision was William Wallace, SJ. Thanks to his representations to the Belgian Province of the Jesuits, brilliant young Jesuits like Pierre Johanns and Georges Dandoy were sent to India to study deeply the sources of the Hindu religion. Udayan Namboodiry says: "The ‘Bengal School,’ which these came to be clubbed under, was the lasting contribution to India of Father William Wallace."

Johanns and his group tried to effect a rapprochement between Hinduism and Christianity at the doctrinal level. Their organ was a monthly publication with the title The Light of the East which began in 1922 and continued for two decades. In the very first issue, the journal declared its aim: "What we... wish... to do is... to help India... to know and understand Jesus. ...We have no intention to put out the existing lights. Rather we shall try to show that the best thought of the East is a bud that fully expanded blossoms into Christian thought."

The school soon came to be known by its outstanding representative, P. Johanns, whose most important piece of writing is now available under the title To Christ through the Vedanta, but which was originally published in the form of articles regularly contributed to The Light of the East.

Given his links with several of the members, Richard De Smet might also be included in the School. He pursued his study of Sanskrit in Calcutta with G. Dandoy, P. Johanns, and R. Antoine, who held a master's degree in Sanskrit from the Calcutta University; and with P. Fallon who knew not only Sanskrit but also Bengali. Antoine and Fallon had started the first dialogue centre, Shanti Bhavan, in Calcutta. De Smet did his doctoral dissertation at the Pontifical Gregorian University, Rome, under the direction of R. Arnou; he got help also from M. Ledrus, at the time Professor of Ascetical and Mystical Theology in the same university.

== Bibliography ==
=== Primary ===
- See Pierre Johanns.
- P. Johanns. Hinduism. London: Catholic Truth Society, 1934.
- P. Johanns. Introduction to Vedanta. Calcutta: Light of the East Series, 23. 42 pp.
- P. Johanns. A Synopsis of 'To Christ through Vedanta' Part I, Sankara. 3rd ed. Calcutta: Light of the East Series, 4. 40 pp.
- P. Johanns. Verse le Christ par le Vedanta. T. I. Cankara et Ramanuja. Tr. from the English by M. Ledrus. Louvain: Museum Lessianum, 1932. 264 pp.
- P. Johanns. La Pensee Religieuse de l'Inde. Tr. by L.M. Gauthier. Namur: Facultes Univ. / Paris: Vrin / Louvain: Nauwelaerts, 1952. 224 pp.
- The Light of the East (1922–1946). Ed. P. Johanns and G. Dandoy.
- G. Dandoy. An Essay on the Doctrine of the Unreality of the World in the Advaita. Reprint from the Catholic Herald of India, Calcutta, Orphan Press, 1919. 66 pp.
- G. Dandoy. L'ontologie du Vedanta. Tr. of the above by Louis-Marcel Gauthier. Paris Desclee de Brouwer, 1932.
- G. Dandoy. Karma, Evil, Punishment. 2nd ed. Calcutta: Light of the East Series, 31. 96 pp.
- J.F. Pessein. Vedanta Vindicated. Tiruchirapally: St Joseph Press, 1925.
- J. Bayart. "Le triple visage du divin dans l'Hindouisme." Nouvelle Revue Theologique (mars 1933).
- C. Bulcke. The Theism of the Nyaya-Vaisesika. Calcutta: Oriental Institute, 1947.
- M. Ledrus. "Bhasya-agama-advaita-drstanta: An illustration of Catholic Advaita." Light of the East 10 (Dec. 1931).
- M. Ledrus. "Apavada in Catholic Advaita." Light of the East 10 (June 1932).
- M. Ledrus. "The Pratijna in Catholic Advaita." Light of the East 10 (Aug 1932).
- M. Ledrus. "L'Absolu Brahmanique." Gregorianum (1932) 261–272.
- M. Ledrus."Chronique de philosophie orientale." Revue Neo-scolastique de Philosophie 35 (about 1933) 426–458.
- M. Ledrus. "The Eternal Brahmanhood." The New Review [Calcutta] 2 (1935) 72–78.
- M. Ledrus. "Themes et tendances de la philosophie indienne." Gregorianum fasc. I (1942) 7–34.
- M. Ledrus. "De Recursu ad Deum apud ethnicos Indiae specimina classica." Studia Missionalia 2 (1946) 55–71.
- M. Ledrus. 'Cursus de Philosophia Samkhyana.' Unpublished.
- See Richard De Smet.

=== Secondary ===
- Anathil, George M. Theological Formation of the Clergy in India. Pune: Pontifical Athenaeum, 1966, 160.
- Coelho, Ivo. “Pierre Johanns, SJ of the ‘Calcutta School’ of Indology.” Review of Sean Doyle, Synthesizing the Vedanta: The Theology of Pierre Johanns, S.J. (Oxford, etc.: Peter Lang, 2006). Divyadaan: Journal of Philosophy and Education 22/1 (2011) 133–140.
- De Smet, Richard. 'The Theological Method of Samkara.' Doctoral dissertation at the Pontifical Gregorian University, Rome, 1953 (unpublished).
- De Smet, R. “Philosophical Topics,” The Clergy Monthly Supplement 4/2 (1958) 89–90.
- De Smet, R. “Śaṅkara Vedanta and Christian Theology,” Review of Darshana 1/1 (1980) 33–48.
- De Smet, R. “The Christian Encounter with Advaita Vedanta: A Survey of Four Centuries,” unpublished.
- De Smet, R. “Surrounded by Excellence: An Evocation,” Jivan: Jesuits of South Asia: Views and News 11/10 (December 1990) 10–11.
- De Smet, R. “Le dialogue vivifié par les textes,” Rhythmes du Monde 15/3-4 (1967) 197–205.
- Doyle, Sean. Synthesizing the Vedanta: The Theology of Pierre Johanns, S.J. Oxford: P. Lang, 2006.
- Doyle, Sean. Light of the East: The Calcutta School of Jesuit Indology on Hindu Advaita Non-Dualism. Boston College: Jesuit Sources, 2026.
- England, John C., Jose Kuttianimattathil, John M. Prior, Lily A. Quintos, David Suh Kwang-sun, Janice Wikeri, ed. Asian Christian Theologies: A Research Guide to Authors, Movements, Sources. Vol. 1: Asia Region 7th–20th centuries; South Asia; Austral Asia. Delhi: ISPCK / Claretian Publishers; Maryknoll: Orbis, 2002. 220-1: Pierre Johanns, sj (1882–1955). [The other members of the school do not find mention in this important publication.]
- Mattam, J. Land of the Trinity: A Study of Modern Christian Approaches to Hinduism. Bangalore: TPI, 1975. 17–43.
- Mattam, J. “Interpreting Christ to India Today: The Calcutta School,” Indian Journal of Theology 23 (1974) 198–202.
- Wilfred, Felix. Beyond Settled Foundations: The Journey of Indian Theology. Madras: Dept. of Christianity at the University of Madras, 1993, 37–40.
