= Pierre Johanns =

Luxemburger Jesuit priest, missionary in India and Indologist

Pierre Johanns (1 April 1882, Heinerscheid, Luxembourg – 8 February 1955, Arlon, Belgium) was a Luxemburger Jesuit priest, missionary in India and Indologist.

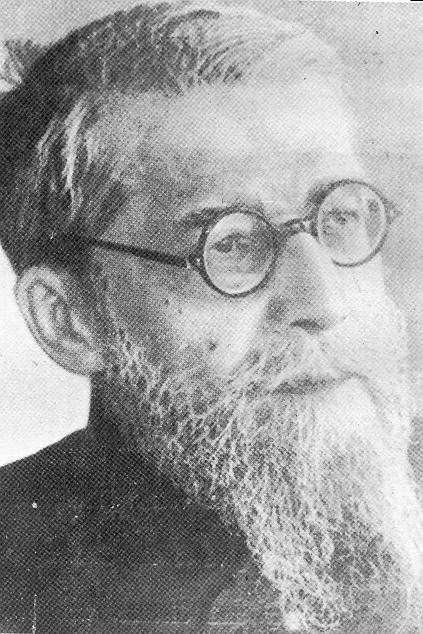
Pierre Johanns (1882–1955).

== Education ==
Johanns was ordained priest on 1 August 1914 at Louvain, three days before World War I broke out and Germany invaded Belgium. He had studied philosophy under the prestigious metaphysician and mystic, Pierre Scheuer. Johanns' superior intelligence, nearing genius, had been recognized and he was destined to further studies while awaiting a still impeded passage to India. He took a full Licentiate in Philosophy from the Catholic University of Leuven (Belgium), and was then sent to Oxford as soon as the end of the war permitted it, in 1919. To evaluate his doctoral dissertation on "The Agent Intellect in the Western and Eastern Philosophies," Oxford University could not find suitable examiners, and had to have recourse to Cambridge. From there came the extraordinary verdict: "only once in a hundred years does one meet such an intellect." Oxford gave him the doctorate with the highest honours and offered him, despite his being a Roman Catholic and Jesuit, a professorship. But his call was for Calcutta, which he reached in November 1921. He taught philosophy at St. Xavier's College, Calcutta, at St Mary's, the Jesuit theologate at Kurseong, Darjeeling, and even in a Vaisnava monastery. He studied ever more deeply the Hindu tradition. Because he always approached the Real in terms of Value, he felt attuned to the aims and methods of Vedanta. As early as October 1922, he and another Oxford graduate and Jesuit confrere, Georges Dandoy, started The Light of the East, a monthly directed to the Hindu intelligentsia as an instrument of interfaith reflection and dialogue. His contributions amounted to 216, 146 of which constitute the work To Christ through the Vedanta. In 1938 ill health forced him to go back to Belgium, where he reached the "Indian Juniorate" (founded in 1935) which, until 1971, would train young Jesuits for work in Bengal.

== Christian approach to Hinduism ==
A pioneer in promoting a new approach to Hindu Spirituality and Theology which he popularized through his Review Light of the East he prepared the radical change of outlook towards Eastern non-Christian religions that ultimately found its way into the Vatican II declaration Nostra aetate (on non-Christian Religions). Inspired by the writings of Brahmabandhab Upadhyay (1861–1907), Johanns found in Shankara, the great Hindu Philosopher of the 9th century, spiritual and theological paths leading to Christ. Doing so he initiated an 'inculturation' movement of the Christian faith. His main work was published in 1932–33 : Vers le Christ par le Vedanta (2 vol.). Due to ill health he returned to Europe and died in Arlon (Belgium) in 1955.

== Bibliography ==
=== Primary ===
- "The Agent Intellect in the Western and Eastern Philosophies". Th.D. dissertation, Oxford University, n.d.
- "To Christ through the Vedanta". The Light of the East 1–13 (Oct. 1922) 3; (Nov. 1922) 3–4; (Dec. 1922) 2; (Jan. 1923) 3–4; (Feb. 1923) 3; (Mar. 1923) 2–3; (Apr. 1923) 3; (May 1923) 3–4; (Jun. 1923) 4–5; (Jul. 1923) 3–4; (Aug. 1923) 4; (Sep. 1923) 3–4; (Oct. 1933) 5; (Nov. 1923) 5–6; (Dec. 1923) 3–4; (Jan. 1924) 3–5; (Feb. 1924) 3–5; (Mar. 1924) 4–6; (Apr. 1924) 3–4; (May 1924) 5–6; (Jun. 1924) 4–5; (Jul. 1924) 3–4; (Aug. 1924) 3–4; (Sep. 1924) 3.5; (Oct. 1924) 3–4; (Nov. 1924) 3–4; (Dec. 1924) 3–4; (Jan. 1925) 4–5; (Feb. 1925) 3–4; (Mar. 1925) 5–7; (Apr. 1925) 3–4; (May 1925) 3–5; (Jun. 1925) 3–5; (Jul. 1925) 4–6; (Aug. 1925) 3–6; (Sep. 1925) 4–5; (Oct. 1925) 3–4; (Nov. 1925) 3–4; (Dec. 1925) 4–5; (Jan. 1926) 2–4; (Feb. 1926) 4–6; (Mar. 1926) 4–5; (Jun. 1926) 6–7; (Jul. 1926) 7–8; (Aug. 1926) 4–6; (Sep. 1926) 4–5; (Oct. 1926, p. 5; (Nov. 1926) 4–5; (Dec. 1926) 5–6; (Jan.1927) 4–6; (Feb.1921) 4–6; (Mar. 1927)4–5; (Apr. 1927) 4–6; (May 1927) 4–5; (Jun. 1927) 4–5; (Jul. 1927) 4–5; (Aug. 1927) 4–5; (Sep. 1927) 3–4; (Oct. 1927) 4–5; (Nov. 1927) 5–6; (Dec. 1927) 5–6; (Jan. 1928) 5–6; (Feb. 1928) 4–6; Mar. 1928) 3–5; (Apr. 1928) 4–6; (May 1928) 4–5; (Jun. 1928) 4–6; (Aug. 1928) 4–8; (Sep. 1928) 4–5; (Oct. 1928) 5–6; Nov. 1928) 5–7; (Dec. 1928) 5–6; Jan. 1929) 4–6; (Feb. 1929) 5–6; (Mar. 1929) 6–8; (Apr. 1929) 3–5; (May 1929)4–5; Jun. 1929) 5–6; Jul. 1929) 5–7; (Aug. 1929) 3–5; (Sep. 1929) 4–6; (Oct. 1929)4–6; (Nov. 1929) 4–6; (Dec. 1929) 4–7; Oct. 193f) 8–12; (Nov. 1931) 21–23; (Dec. 1931) 31–34; (Jan. 1932) 44–47; (Mar. 1932) 69–72; (Apr. 1932) 82–84; (May 1932) 94–96; (Jun. 1932)106–108; (Jul. 1932) 116–119; (Aug. 1932) 129–132; (Sep. 1932)141–144; (Oct. 1932) 10–12; (Nov. 1932) 16–19; (Dec. 1932) 30–32; (Jan. 1933) 45–48; (Feb. 1933) 55–57; (Mar. 1933) 67–69; (Apr. 1933) 79–81; (Jun. 1933) 104–106; (Jul. 1933) 113–116; (Aug. 1933) 125–127; (Sep. 1933) 140–142; Oct. 1933) 6–8; (Nov. 1933) 19–22; (Dec. 1933) 30–34; (Mar. 1934) 69–71; (Apr. 1934) 78–81.
- "Three Views on Nature". The Light of the East (Jul. 1924) 1–2.
- "The Goal of Christian Spirituality". The Light of the East (Jan. 1934) 42–45.
- "Short Outlines of Hinduism". The Light of the East (Jul. 1934) 115–119; (Sep. 1934) 140–142; (Jan. 1935) 43–47; (Feb. 1935) 54–57; (Mar. 1935) 68–71; (Oct. 1935) 7–9, (Nov. 1935) 20–24; (Dec. 1935) 32–35.
- "Pure Actuality and World Possibility". The Light of the East (Mar. 1936) 67–69.
- "Deiformity and Deiformation". The Light of the East (Apr. 1936) 81–84.
- "Christian Faith and Vedanta". The Light of the East (May 1936) 93–96.
- "Outlines of a Philosophy of the Ideal". The Light of the East (Jun. 1936) 106–108; (Jul. 1936) 117–129; (Sep. 1936) 129–132.
- "Panentheism". The Light of the East (Sep. 1936) 142–144.
- "The Quest for God in the Rigveda". The Light of the East (Jan. 1937) 16–17.
- "The Quest of God in the Brahmanas". The Light of the East (Apr. 1937) 76–77.
- "Quest of God in the Older Upanishads". The Light of the East (Oct. 1937) 196- 199.
- "The Quest of God in the Upanishads". The Light of the East (Dec. 1937) 234–236; (Mar. 1938) 56–58.
- "To Christ through the Vedanta". Synopsis. MS (1930), in Indian Academy Papers 1930, St Mary's Kurseong, 769–817. [See Baago 49.]
- A Synopsis of To Christ through the Vedanta. Part I: Samkara. Part II: Rāmānuja. Part III: Vallabha. Part IV: Chaitanya. Light of the East Series nos. 4, 7, 9, 19. Calcutta: Light of the East Secretariate / Ranchi: Catholic Press, 1944 (for the last vol.; the first 3 vols were publ. in 1930–1932).
- Vers le Christ par le Vedanta. 2 vols. Louvain: Museum Lessianum, section philosophique, 1932–33.
- Hinduism. London, 1935.
- Introduction to the Vedanta. Light of the East Series, no. 23. Calcutta: Light of the East Office, 1943. [The date is from De Smet, "Bibliography," Guidelines in Indian Philosophy ([Pune: JDV,] 1968) 3.]
- La pensée religieuse de l'Inde. Namur, 1952 (with a Préface by Olivier Lacombe).
- Veronica: A Passion Play. The Light of the East Series, no. 5.
- Refuge of Sinners: A Mystery Play. The Light of the East Series, no. 8.
- Annunciation: A Mystery Play. The Light of the East Series, no. 14.
- The Little Way. The Light of the East Series 15. Calcutta, 1931.
- To Christ through the Vedānta: The Writings of Reverend P. Johanns, S.J. 2 vols. Ed. Theo de Greeff. Bangalore: The United Theological College, 1996.
- "General Historical Survey. Part I (B.C. 1200 – A.D. 700)." Religious Hinduism. 4th rev. edition. Ed. R. De Smet and J. Neuner. Mumbai: St Pauls, 1997. 31–48. [Taken from Hinduism, London 1935, see De Smet, "Foreword" 19.]
- "General Historical Survey. Part II (A.D. 700 – 1600)." Religious Hinduism. 4th rev. edition. Ed. R. De Smet and J. Neuner. Mumbai: St Pauls, 1997. 49–64. [Taken from Hinduism, London 1935, see De Smet, "Foreword" 19.]

=== Secondary ===
- Aleaz, K.P. Christian Thought through Advaita Vedanta. Delhi: ISPCK, 1996.
- Coelho, Ivo. "Pierre Johanns, SJ of the 'Calcutta School' of Indology". Review of Sean Doyle, Synthesizing the Vedanta: The Theology of Pierre Johanns, S.J. (Oxford, etc.: Peter Lang, 2006). Divyadaan: Journal of Philosophy and Education 22/1 (2011) 133–140.
- De Smet, Richard. "Foreword." Religious Hinduism. 4th ed. Ed. R. De Smet and J. Neuner. Mumbai: St Pauls, 1997. 19.
- Doyle, Sean, Synthesizing the Vedanta: the Theology of Pierre Johanns S.J. Oxford: P. Lang, 2006.
- Doyle, Sean. Light of the East: The Calcutta School of Jesuit Indology on Hindu Advaita Non-Dualism. Boston College: Jesuit Sources, 2026.
- Mattam, Joseph, Land of the Trinity: A Study of Modern Christian approaches to Hinduism, Bangalore, TPI, 1975.
- Mattam, Joseph, "Interpreting Christ to India: The Calcutta School". Indian Journal of Theology 23 (1974) 198–202.
- Wilfred, Felix, Beyond Settled Foundations: The Journey of Indian Theology, Madras, Department of Christian Studies at the University of Madras, 1993. Ch. 3 A: "Fr P. Johanns and the Calcutta School," 37–40.
- England, John C., Jose Kuttianimattathil, John M. Prior, Lily A. Quintos, David Suh Kwang-sun, Janice Wikeri, eds. Asian Christian Theologies: A Research Guide to Authors, Movements, Sources. Vol. 1: Asia Region 7th–20th centuries; South Asia; Austral Asia. Delhi: ISPCK / Claretian Publishers; Maryknoll: Orbis, 2002. 220-1: Pierre Johanns, sj (1882–1955).
