= William Wallace (Jesuit) =

William Wallace (2 March 1863 in Battibrack, Dublin – 14 November 1922 in Kurseong, West Bengal) was an Anglican priest who later became a Roman Catholic priest, member of the Society of Jesus (Jesuits) and Indologist.

== Life ==
William Wallace was personally tutored by his father, an Evangelical minister. He attended Trinity College Dublin in 1882, received a degree in divinity, and sought ordination in the Anglican tradition at the age of 24. He took up parish work in the Midlands in England, but, after an illness, returned to Ireland to recuperate. Two years later, he decided to become a missionary with the Church Missionary Society, and was appointed to Krishnagar, West Bengal, in 1889. Disillusioned with the Christianity practiced by his fellow Anglicans, he left the Mission quarters and took up residence in a little hut in Krishnagar where he devoted himself to the study of Bengali and Gaudiya Vaisnavism. His life of simplicity and seeking endeared him to his Indian neighbours. His contact with Bengali Hindus led him to the opinion that Protestant spiritualty was inadequate to meet the needs of his deeply spiritual Vaisnava friends.

After serving seven years in Bengal, he returned to Ireland on home leave. There he made a study of Catholic theology and spirituality, and became convinced that only Catholicism could provide him with the means of dialoguing with his Hindu associates, and that only Catholic spirituality was worth preaching to the Bengalis. Having been rejected by the Mill Hill Fathers, he requested admission to the Jesuit Order whose members were active in Bengal. He was accepted by the Belgian provincial and entered the novitiate on the 15 February 1898. Upon finishing the two years spiritual training in England, he arrived in Calcutta on 13 December 1901.

He engaged in further studies in philosophy and theology at Shembaganur and St Mary's, Kurseong before being appointed as a lecturer in English literature at St Xavier's College, Calcutta. He was later sent to Darjeeling as lecturer and parish priest among the Anglo-Indians. It was at this time that he composed his autobiography, From Evangelical to Catholic by Way of the East, and also several works on Hindu philosophy and yoga. He wanted to make use of Indian philosophy to make an acceptable presentation of Christianity to the Hindus. With his health beginning to fail, he was transferred back to St Mary's, Kurseong, in 1921. He died on 14 November 1922.

== Significance ==
Wallace's significance rests on the influence he exerted upon his contemporaries and on younger Jesuits about the way mission was done in Bengal. He helped shift the mentality toward Indian spirituality among the Jesuits and influence the spiritual formation of the novices who were preparing for service in India. He entreated his superiors in Belgium to send their most talented scholastics to engage in the deep study of Hindu texts. Pierre Johanns and Georges Dandoy were fruits of this vision of Wallace. These St Xavier's Jesuits "produced a durable synthesis of Catholicism and Hinduism.... The 'Bengal School,' which these came to be clubbed under, was the lasting contribution to India of Father William Wallace." The 'Bengal School' is also known as the 'Calcutta School of Indology'.

Wallace was inspired by the efforts of Brahmabandhab Upadhyay and Animananda. With them he felt that Christianity had to be Indianized if it had to gain a successful hearing in Bengal. He had read Upadhyay's articles in Sophia and had been impressed by his basic motivations. In his own writings, he reiterated Upadhyay's approach regarding the suitability of Indian philosophy as a natural foundation for a supernatural religion.

== Bibliography ==
=== Primary bibliography ===
- From Evangelical to Catholic by Way of the East. The Light of the East Series, no. 35. Calcutta: Catholic Orphan Press, 1923.
- Introduction to Hindoo Clairvoyance. Kurseong, 1920. Typescript, unpublished. MS at Goethals Library, St Xavier's College, Calcutta.
- A Bengali Commentary on the Yoga Philosophy. 1923. Polycopied, unpublished. MS at Goethals Library, St Xavier's College, Calcutta.
- The Everlasting Religion of the Hindoo Sages in Relation to the Catholic Religion of the Christian Fathers. Typescript, unpublished. Varia of Wallace, Goethals Library, St Xavier's College, Calcutta.

=== Secondary bibliography ===
- Doyle, Sean. Synthesizing the Vedanta: The Theology of Pierre Johanns, S.J. Oxford: P. Lang, 2006. 123–126.
- Doyle, Sean. Light of the East: The Calcutta School of Jesuit Indology on Hindu Advaita Non-Dualism. Boston College: Jesuit Sources, 2026.
- Gille, Albert. "In Memoriam: William Wallace, 1863–1922." The Catholic Herald of India 5 (22 November 1922) 803–4.
- Namboodiry, Udayan. St Xavier's: The Making of a Calcutta Institution. New Delhi: Viking/Penguin Books India, 1995.
- Francis X. Clooney, SJ, "Alienation, Xenophilia, And Coming Home: William Wallace, SJ's From Evangelical to Catholic by Way of the East," Common Knowledge 24.2 (2018), 280–290
