= Jan Baptist van Deynum =

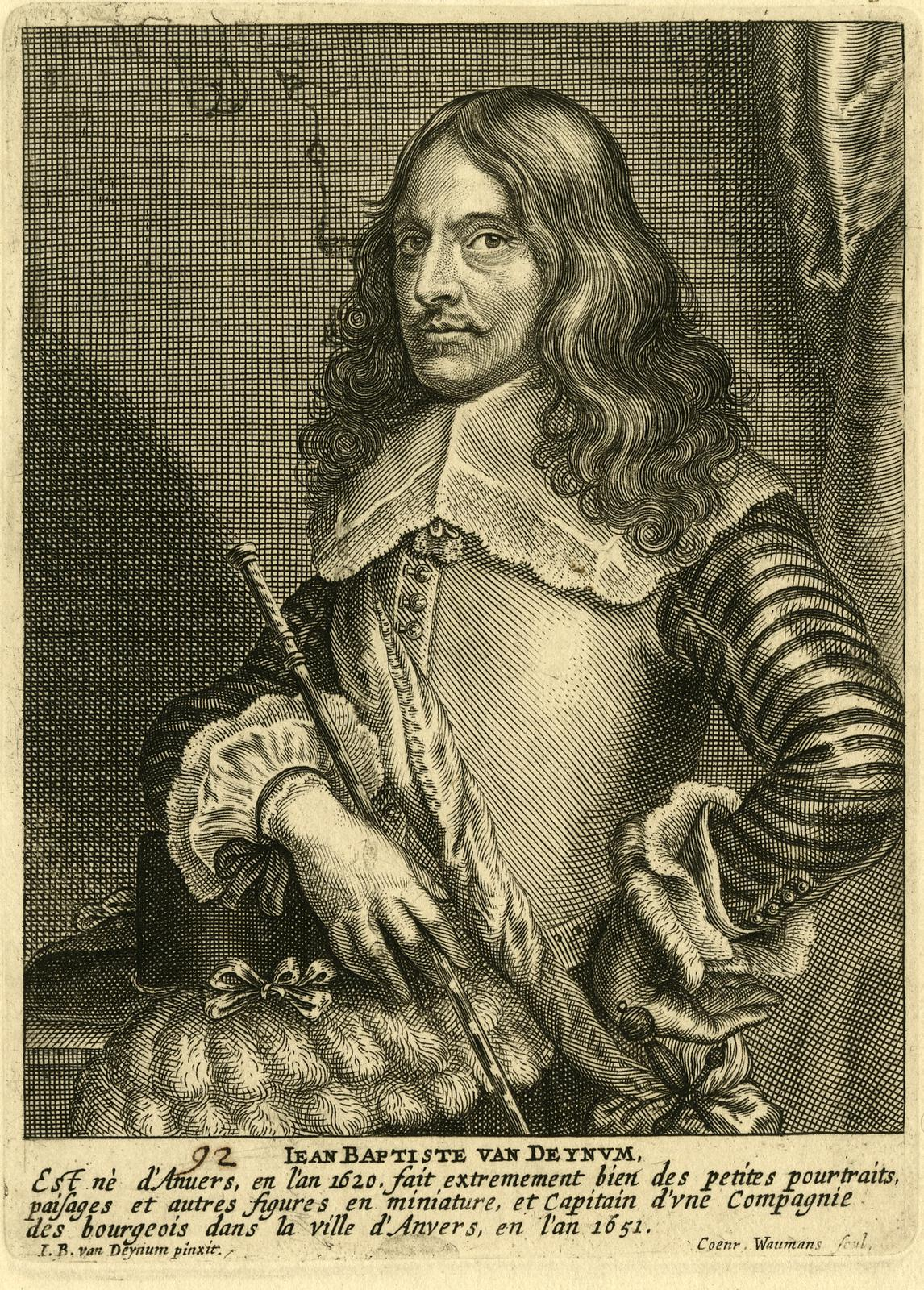
- Jan Baptist van Deynum in Het Gulden Cabinet
- Born: 1620; Antwerp
- Died: 2 or 3 May 1668; Antwerp
- Known for: Painting
- Movement: Baroque

Jan Baptist van Deynum, Dynen or Duinen (1620–1668), was a Flemish Baroque painter and a captain of the local civil guard in Antwerp. He is said to have painted portraits, genre subjects, history paintings and landscapes.

== Biography ==
Very little is known about the artist. He may have been a member of the family of artists active in Antwerp, which included the still life painter G. van Deynum and the staffage painter Abraham van Deynum. He was admitted as a master in the capacity of 'wijnmeester' (son of a master) in the Guild of St. Luke of Antwerp between 18 September 1647 and 18 September 1648. On 26 September 1651 he became captain of the local civil guard. The contemporary Flemish artist biographer Cornelis de Bie praises Jan Baptist van Deynum in his Het Gulden Cabinet of 1662 as a respected painter who neglected his job as captain of a local civil guard in Antwerp in order to have more time to pursue his passion for painting.

He paid the Guild the death duties for his first wife (name unknown) between 18 September 1662 and 18 September 1663. He remarried and his widow (2nd wife, name unknown) died between 18 September 1683 and 21 September 1684.

At the time of his death on 2 or 3 May 1668 he lived on Rogier.

== Work ==
According to the text below his portrait in de Bie's Het Gulden Cabinet, van Deynum painted portraits, landscapes and other miniature figures. In 1662, his works could be admired in the "Koningshof" in Antwerp. This appears to suggest that van Deynum mainly painted decorative works and cabinet paintings and can explain why no surviving works are currently attributed to him.
