= Pierre Scheuer =

Belgian Jesuit priest, metaphysician and mystic

Pierre Scheuer (9 November 1872, Schaerbeek – 6 February 1957, Louvain) was a Belgian Jesuit priest, metaphysician and mystic.

== Life and works ==
Scheuer made his first profession in the Society of Jesus in 1901. In 1916 he completed his formation and began teaching.

In 1920 the Jesuit Superior General, Wlodimir Ledóchowski, sent Bulot to speak with Pierre Scheuer (and also Pierre Charles) about their support for some suspected philosophical propositions supposedly drawn from the work of Pierre Rousselot's Les yeux de la foi. However, Emile Mersch spoke with Bulot and wrote to the General in defense of Scheuer and Charles. However, the General ‘rusticated’ Scheuer. Forbidden to teach, Scheuer begun an intense new career of retreat preaching, especially to the clergy.

Though he hardly published anything, Scheuer’s influence, especially on the Jesuit College at Louvain, is described as exceptionally wide and deep. He was a senior colleague and close friend of Joseph Marechal. For 40 or 50 years one could see the two friends walking along the corridors of the college, Scheuer’s Plato to Marechal’s more timid Aristotle. His relationship to Marechal remains a problem: Marechal is far better known, because he wrote more. If they have a common source in the philosophy of immanence of Maurice Blondel, the opening towards Kant was due to the initiative of Scheuer. This is not to make of Marechal his disciple or successor; his originality remains intact; but he profited from the favourable atmosphere towards the Kantian critique in the scholasticate of Louvain under the influence of Scheuer.

Richard De Smet counts Scheuer among his great influences, and describes him as “a prince among metaphysicians and a mystic,” saying that “[e]very conversation with him, every answer he gave me to difficult problems of philosophy or faith, every rare lecture he gave us were seeds of enduring light.” Scheuer’s influence persists in the metaphysics notes composed by De Smet.

Citing Scheuer, De Smet says: “all metaphysics worthy of the name tends to consume itself in the deep silence of mystical introversion”. And again: “We are in the mind of God exactly like the circle in the mind of the mathematician.”

In 1966, Daniel J. Shine edited a set of 9 unpublished essays and two other published essays of Scheuer, under the title An Interior Metaphysics: the Philosophical Synthesis of Pierre Scheuer, s.j.

== Bibliography ==
=== Primary ===
- “Notes de Métaphysique.” Nouvelle Revue Theologique (1926) 329-334; 447-451; 518-525.
- “Deux texts inédits du R.P. Pierre Scheuer, S.J. I. Conscience humaine. II. Dieu.” Nouvelle Revue Theologique T. 79, Annee 89 (1957) 816-827.
- An Interior Metaphysics: the Philosophical Synthesis of Pierre Scheuer, s.j. Ed. Daniel J. Shine, Weston, Weston College Press, 1966.

=== Secondary ===
- Gaston Isaye. “Une métaphysique ‘intérieure’ et rigoureuse: La pensee du R.P. Pierre Scheuer, S.J. (1872-1957).” Nouvelle Revue Theologique T. 79, Annee 89 (1957) 798-815.
- Michel de Give, Review of Daniel J. Shine, An Interior Metaphysics: the Philosophical Synthesis of Pierre Scheuer, s.j. Revue Philosophique de Louvain 65/86 (1967) 243-245.
- P.E. Dirven. De la forme à l’acte: Essai sur le thomisme de Joseph Marechal. Museum Lessianum, 1965.
- Andrè Hayen. “In Memoriam Pierre Scheuer, S.J.” Revue Philosophique de Louvain 55/45 (1957) 139-142.
- Eric D. Perl, “Lux mentium: Augustine’s Argument to God as Truth and Its Recent Resumptions,” International Philosophical Quarterly 64 (2024) 93-110.
