= Joseph Maréchal =

Belgian Jesuit priest and philosopher (1878–1944)

The Reverend Joseph Maréchal SJ
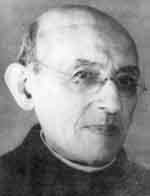
- Born: 1 July 1878; Charleroi, Belgium
- Died: 11 December 1944 (aged 66); Leuven, Belgium

Education
- Education: Catholic University of Leuven (1901–1905; D.Sc., 1905)

Philosophical work
- Era: 20th-century philosophy
- Region: Western philosophy
- School: Transcendental Thomism
- Main interests: Metaphysics, philosophical theology
- Notable ideas: Introducing transcendental Thomism

Joseph Maréchal, SJ (French: [maʁeʃal]; 1 July 1878 – 11 December 1944) was a Belgian Jesuit priest, philosopher, theologian and psychologist. He taught at the Higher Institute of Philosophy of the University of Leuven and was the founder of the school of thought called transcendental Thomism, which attempted to merge the theological and philosophical thought of St. Thomas Aquinas with that of Immanuel Kant.

== Life and thought ==
Maréchal joined the Jesuits in 1895 and after a doctorate in biology at Leuven (1905) he first specialized in experimental psychology, spending some time in Munich with Wilhelm Wundt (1911). Until the end of his life Maréchal would say that his real interest was more in psychology than in philosophy.

Prompted by the call of Pope Leo XIII to revitalize Thomist theology, he started studying in depth the works of St. Thomas Aquinas in order to understand the inner coherence of his system, along with the works of other scholastic thinkers, modern philosophers and scientists of the day. From this, and in particular from Kant's transcendental idealism, emerged a new and more dynamic Thomism, recapturing the union of 'act and power' in Aquinas. The development of his thought can be grasped in the five cahiers (see bibliography) in which, after exposing the weaknesses of traditional Thomism, he evaluated Kant's philosophy (3rd cahier) with whose help he proposes a modernized Thomism in the 4th and 5th cahier. The work of Maréchal had a great influence on such contemporary theologians and philosophers as Andre Marc, Gaston Isaye, Joseph de Finance, Karl Rahner, Bernard Lonergan, Johannes Baptist Lotz, Bernard O'Brien and Richard De Smet.

In the same way, he proceeded to study the psychology of the mystics. Until his death on 11 December 1944 he taught philosophy and experimental psychology at the Jesuit House of Studies in Leuven (St Albert of Leuven's Philosophical and Theological College). He was a great friend of Pierre Scheuer, the Belgian Jesuit who has been described as a metaphysician and mystic.

== Main works ==
- Maréchal, Joseph (2004). The Psychology of the Mystics. Mineola, New York: Dover Publications. ISBN 9780486436944.
- Le point de départ de la métaphysique: leçons sur le développement historique et théorique du problème de la connaissance, 5 vols, (Bruges-Louvain, 1922–47).
- Études sur le psychologie des mystiques, 2 vols, (1926, 1937) [translated as Studies in the Psychology of the Mystics, tr. A. Thorold, (New York, 1964).
- Précis d'histoire de la philosophie moderne, (Louvain, 1933).
- Mélanges Joseph Maréchal, 2 vols, (Brussels / Paris, 1950).
- "The Intellectual Dynamism in Objective Knowledge." Tr. Richard De Smet and others. [Original, 'Le dynamisme intellectual dans la conaisance objective', in Revue néoscolastique de Philosophie 28 (1927) 137–165 = Mélanges Joseph Maréchal (Brussels / Paris, 1950) 1:75–101.] Poona: De Nobili College, 1963–65. 1–37. Unpublished. Available at Jnana Deepa, Institute of Philosophy and TheologyLibrary, Pune, N13/M332.
- "At the Threshold of Metaphysics: Abstraction or Intuition?" Tr. Richard De Smet and others. [Original in Revue néoscolastique de Philosophie 31(1929) 27–52, 121–147, 309–342.] Poona: De Nobili College, 1963–65. 38–149. Unpublished. Available at Jnana Deepa, Institute of Philosophy and Theology Library, Pune, N13/M332.
- "The Natural Desire for Perfect Happiness." Tr. Richard De Smet and others. [Original in Mélanges Joseph Maréchal (Brussels / Paris, 1950) 2:323–337.] Poona: De Nobili College, 1963–65. 150–170. Unpublished. Available at Jnana Deepa, Institute of Philosophy and Theology Library, Pune, N13/M332.
- A Maréchal Reader, edited and translated by Joseph Donceel (New York: Herder & Herder, 1970)

== See also ==
- List of Jesuit scientists
- List of Roman Catholic scientist-clerics
