= Joseph Donceel =

Joseph F. Donceel (1906–1994) was a Belgian Jesuit and a professor at Fordham University.

== Life ==
Donceel was born in Zwijndrecht, Belgium to Armandus Donceel and Maria Vernimmen on 16 September 1906. He entered the Society of Jesus at Arlon in 1924, making his first vows in 1926 after the noviciate in Drongen. He went on to study theology and psychology at the Jesuit house of studies in Egenhoven and at the Catholic University of Leuven. He was ordained as a priest in Leuven on 24 August 1938 by Jean-Marie Van Cauwenbergh.

Donceel joined the faculty of Fordham University in 1944 and taught rational and experimental psychology at Fordham College until 1972, when he became professor emeritus.

He translated works by Joseph Maréchal, Karl Rahner, and Pierre Rousselot.

He died at the Jesuit infirmary on Fordham University's Rose Hill campus after a long illness on 15 December 1994, at the age of 88.

== Publications ==
- La fatigue mentale (Namur, Wesmael-Charlier, 1937)
- Natural Theology (New York, Sheed & Ward, 1962)
- Philosophical Anthropology (New York, Sheed & Ward, 1967)
