= Georges Dandoy =

Belgian Jesuit priest, missionary in India, theologian and Indologist

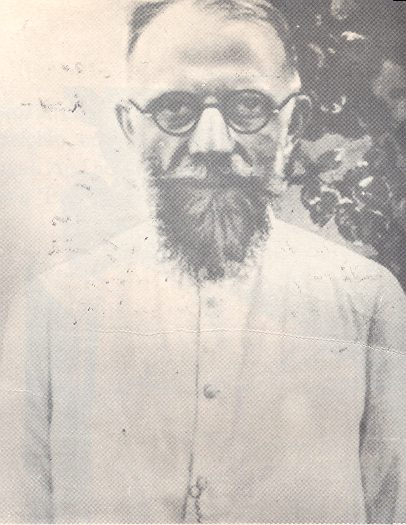
Georges Dandoy

Georges Dandoy (5 February 1882 in Hemptinne, Namur, Belgium – 11 June 1962 in Kolkata, India) was a Belgian Jesuit priest, missionary in India, theologian and Indologist. He is included in the so-called ‘Calcutta School of Indology’ (sometimes also known as the 'Bengal School').

== Education ==
After a year of philosophical studies at Namur (1904–1905), he was sent to Stonyhurst, England to complete his philosophy (1905–1907), and to begin studying Sanskrit at Oxford University (1907–1909). Sent to Kolkata, he began teaching at St Xavier's College (1909–1912) before beginning his theological studies at St Mary's, Kurseong, near Darjeeling (1912–1916). He was ordained priest in November 1914.

== Work ==
His theological thinking was influenced by William Wallace SJ, a former Anglican priest who had become a Roman Catholic following his study of Hinduism. Dandoy was, above all, very close to the missiology of Pierre Charles, who encouraged an approach that was both respectful of the religions and open to the cultures of the East. After some years of teaching theology at Kurseong (1917–1922), Dandoy returned to Kolkata where he passed the rest of his life. While in Kurseong, in 1919, he published An Essay in the Doctrine of the Unreality of the World in the Advaita. In 1932 he published L'ontologie du Vedanta: Essai sur l'acosmisme de l'Advaita; Jacques Maritain and Olivier Lacombe both contributed commentaries at the end of the work.

While being rector of a house of formation, he devoted himself totally to research and wrote articles and books in the field of the encounter between Catholic theology and Hinduism. With Pierre Johanns he founded and edited the monthly The Light of the East.

== Bibliography ==
=== Primary ===
- "The Philosophy of Rāmānuja as compared with that of Śaṅkara". Doctoral dissertation, Oxford University.
- An Essay in the Doctrine of the Unreality of the World in the Advaita. Calcutta: Catholic Orphan Press, 1919; translated (with slight adaptations) into French (by Louis-Marcel Gauthier) as L'ontologie du Vedânta. Essai sur l'acosmisme de l'Advaita, with additional commentaries by Jacques Maritain and Olivier Lacombe, Paris: Desclée de Brouwer, 1932.
- "What is Catholicism?" Light of the East (Oct. 1922) 4; (Dec. 1922) 3–4; (Feb. 1923) 4; (Mar. 1923) 3; (May 1923) 4–5.
- "Catholicism and National Customs". Light of the East (Dec. 1922) 1; (Jan. 1923) 1; (Feb. 1923) 1.
- "Who was Jesus of Nazareth?" Light of the East (Feb. 1923) 23; (Mar. 1923) 2; (Apr. 1923) 2–3; (May 1923) 2–3.
- "Mystic Experience". Light of the East (Apr. 1925) 1–2; (May 1925) 1–2; (Jun. 1925) 1–2; (Jul. 1925) 1–2; (Aug. 1925) 1–2; (Sep. 1925) 1–2; (Nov. 1925) 1–2; (Dec. 1925) 1–2.
- "The Vedantic Theory of Reaching God by Stages of Perfection". Light of the East (Dec. 1925) 65–66.
- "The Mystic Experiences". Light of the East (Jan. 1926) 1–2; (Feb. 1926) 1–2; (Mar. 1926) 1–2; (Apr. 1926) 1–2; (May1926) 1–2.
- "Were All Our Ancestors Condemned to Hell". Light of the East (Mar. 1926) 1–2; (Apr. 1927) 1–2; (Jun. 1927) 1–2; (Jul. 1927) 1–2; (Aug. 1927) 1–2; (Sep. 1927) 1–2; (Nov. 1927) 1–2; (Dec. 1927) 1–2; (Jan. 1928) 1–2; (Feb. 1928) 1–2.
- "Religious Experience and Religion". Light of the East (Sep. 1926) 1–2.
- "Religions and Religion". Light of the East (Feb. 1927) 1–2.
- "Hindu Semi-Pessimism and its Consequences". Light of the East (Jan. 1931) 37–38.
- "Scholasticism and Advaita". Light of the East (Jul. 1932) 109–112.
- "Catholicism and Hinduism". Light of the East (Jun. 1931) 97–99; (Jul. 1931) 109–110; (Aug. 1931) 121–123; (Sep. 1931) 135–137; (Oct. 1931) 1–4; (Nov. 1931) 13–17; (Jan. 1932) 37–40; (Apr. 1932) 73–78; (May 1932) 85–89; (Sep. 1932) 133–137; (Oct. 1932) 1–5; (Jan. 1933) 37–40; (Feb. 1933) 49–52; (Mar. 1933) 61–64; (Apr. 1933) 73–76; (Jun. 1933) 97–100; (Dec. 1933) 25–28.
- "Is One Religion as Good as Another?" Light of the East (Aug. 1933) 121–123.
- "Are All Religions Good?" Light of the East (Sep. 1933) 133–136.
- "Religions and Religion". Light of the East (Nov. 1933) 13–15.
- "Mukti according to Madhva." Light of the East 14 (1935–6). [De Smet, "Bibliography," Guidelines in Indian Philosophy ([Pune: Jnana Deepa Vidyapeeth,] 1968) 5.]
- "Why Gandhiji Blames Us". Light of the East (Dec. 1937) 225–227; (Jan. 1938) 5–8; (Feb. 1938) 25–28.
- "The Indwelling God". Light of the East (Feb. 1939) 22–24.
- "Asceticism". Light of the East (Mar. 1939) 44–48.
- "Vivarta and Creation". Light of the East (Nov. 1939) 205–209.
- "Creation and Mystical Union". Light of the East (Aug. 1941) 118–122; (Sep. 1941) 135–138.
- "Creation as a Religious Doctrine". Light of the East (Oct. 1941) 149–152.
- "Objection to Creation". Light of the East (May 1943) 69–71; (Jun. 1943) 85–87; (Jul. 1943) 102–106; (Aug. 1943) 118–121.
- "Prolegomena to Our Theological Task". Light of the East (Aug. 1943) 122–123; (oct. 1943) 155–158.
- "Living Christ". Light of the East (Jan. 1945) 2–6.
- "Religion versus Religions." Light of the East 17 (1939). [Religious Hinduism (1968) 327.]
- What is Catholicism? The Light of the East Series, no. 6. Calcutta, 1934.
- Catholicism and National Culture. The Light of the East Series, no. 27. Calcutta, 1939.
- Karma – Evil – Punishment. The Light of the East Series, no. 31. Calcutta, 1940. Ranchi: Catholic Press, 1940 [the latter information from De Smet, "Bibliography," Guidelines in Indian Philosophy ([Pune: Jnana Deepa Vidyapeeth,] 1968) 3.]

=== Secondary ===
- Doyle, Sean. Synthesizing the Veda: The Theology of Pierre Johanns, S.J. Oxford: P. Lang, 2006. 126ff.
- Doyle, Sean. Light of the East: The Calcutta School of Jesuit Indology on Hindu Advaita Non-Dualism. Boston College: Jesuit Sources, 2026.
- Muller, Karl. "George Dandoy." Biographical Dictionary of Christian Missions. Ed. G. Anderson. New York: Macmillan, 1998. 168.
- Y. Steenhault. History of the Jesuits in West Bengal. Ranchi: Catholic Press, n.d. 90–91.
