= Guilliam van Deynum =

Flemish painter

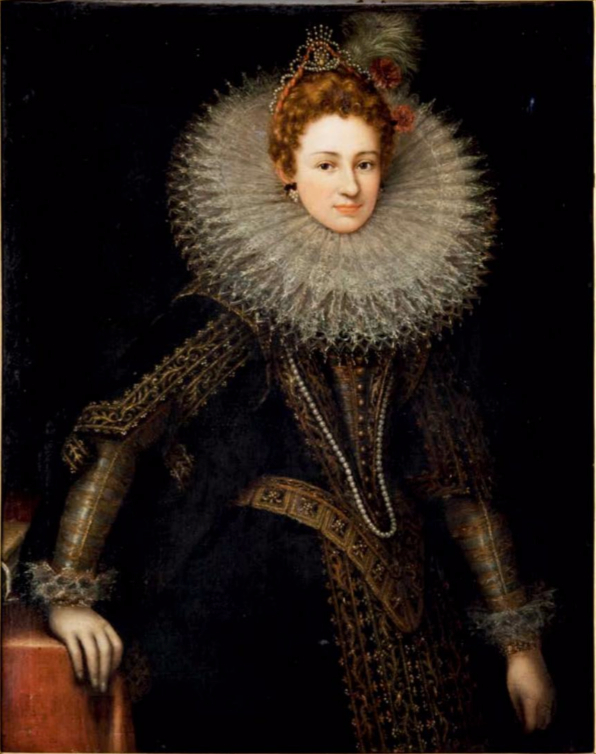
Portrait of a lady

Guilliam van Deynum or Guilliam van Deynen (Antwerp, c. 1575 - Brussels, after 1624) was a Flemish painter, illuminator and miniaturist. He was mainly a portrait artist. After training in Antwerp he spent in the early 17th century a decade in Genoa where he was a successful portrait painter. He returned to Flanders where he worked in Brussels as a portrait painter to the Governors of the Habsburg Netherlands Archduke Albert and the Infanta Isabella.

== Life ==
Guilliam van Deynum was born around 1575 in Antwerp. He is believed to be identical with the Gilliam van Deynen (or van Deynum) who was registered in the Antwerp Guild of Saint Luke in 1596. The name of his teacher is not recorded. He had a brother called Antoni (or Antoon) who was a pupil of Frans Francken the Elder in 1595 and became a master of the Guild in the guild year 1616–1617.

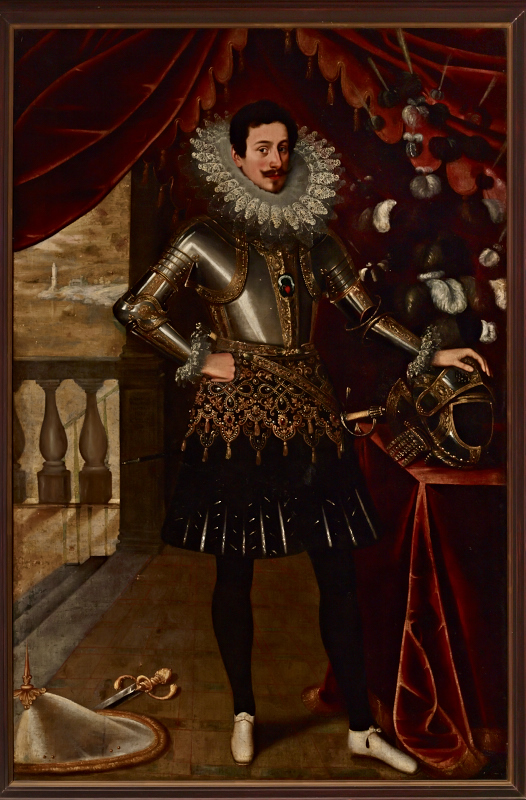
Portrait of a nobleman

Van Deynum arrived in Genoa in 1602 in the company of two brothers, one of whom was the Antoni mentioned earlier and another of whom the name has not been preserved. He must have achieved success early on as he painted a portrait of the local doge Agostino Doria sitting on a throne with his family not long after his arrival. It is known that he was the victim of an assault in 1606 and that in 1607 he was imprisoned for non-payment in a case concerning his activity as an art dealer. The Portrait of a Genovese lady in a black dress (Palazzo Bianco, Genoa) dated 1610 is the latest dated painting attributed to the period of his residence in Genoa. He is believed to have remained in Genoa until 1613.

Between 1613 and 1614 he is documented in Brussels when the Archdukes Albert and Isabella commissioned two miniatures with their weapons and scenes of the 'Circumcision' and the 'Resurrection'. These works were sent on 10 May 1614 to Philip II, Duke of Stettin and Pomerania, who had requested these works in May 1613. On 20 May 1614, 10 days after the miniatures were delivered, van Deynum formally entered the service of the Archdukes and was named an illuminator of the Brussels court.

After some time van Deynum came into conflict with the Brussels Guild of Saint Luke. As long as he solely worked for the Archdukes he was free from the local Guild requirements. However, once he started to work for private patrons, the Guild protested and the Guild's deacon fined van Deynum. Van Deynum refused to pay and was then sued before the Magistrate's court. The court requested he either join the Guild or cease to work as an artist. He appealed the verdict to the Council of Brabant, which confirmed the court's ruling. He then took his case to the Archdukes who supported him. By letters executed in Ghent on 31 July 1618 they exempted him from the obligation to join the painter's Guild and relieved him of all his obligations towards the Guild. Van Deynum is documented working on private commissions for Charles d'Arenberg and Anne de Croy in Enghien around 1614–1617. He collaborated with Servaes de Coulx and Jacob van der Laemen on the Adoration of the Magi (Enghien, convent of the Capuchins). His contribution to this work was probably limited to the portraits in the background.

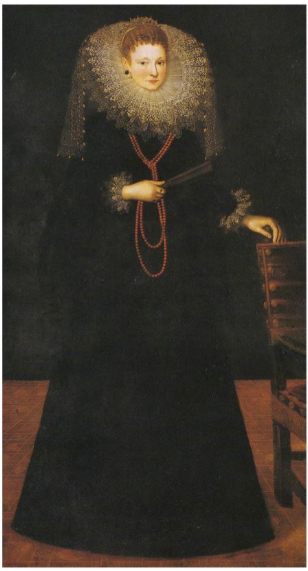
Portrait of a Genovese lady in a black dress

The last mention of his work at the court of Brussels is in the year 1624. It is not known when or where he died.

== Work ==
The known oeuvre of van Deynum is limited to about 10 works. Van Deynum painted portraits and history paintings. Due to confusion with the still life painter G. van Deynum, some still lifes have erroneously been attributed to the artist. He was an oil on canvas painter as well as a miniature painter and illuminator who worked with gouache on parchment. The work of the artist is still not very well studied and understood. The signed and dated Portrait of a Genovese lady in a black dress (1610, Palazzo Bianco, Genoa) plays an important role in identifying his oeuvre.

The Portrait of a Genovese lady in a black dress of 1610 shows his work to be strongly linked to the forms of expression of the end of the 16th century and to closely follow the cold and impersonal approach of Frans Pourbus the Elder. His style of portrait painting is situated in the so-called international style of painting. At the time van Deynum painted the Portrait of a Genovese lady in a black dress in Genoa, the city was in a period of transition, during which, before the arrival of Anthony van Dyck in 1621, he and other Flemish artists introduced a form of delicate and sincere naturalism in the rigid late 16th century schemes.

Apart from three female portraits and one male portrait given to the artist, the best known works of the artist are a miniature representing The doge Agostino Doria sitting on a throne with his family (private collection) and a painting depicting Archduke of Austria and Isabella of Austria at a reception ball in Genoa (private collection).

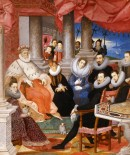
The doge Agostino Doria sitting on a throne with his family

The portrait of doge Agostino Doria and his family of 1604 was likely painted for the private use of the doge as Genoese law did not allow the doges to commission public pictures of themselves to show off their achievements. The painting shows in the foreground the doge, his wife and their four children sitting on a large terrace next to a classicizing building, and offering in the back a view over the Ligurian coastline. Behind three columns in the back, six other figures appear to be peering in at the doge's family. They include on the left the doge's nephew and the painter van Deynum himself and on the right two bearded guards with halberds. There is also a bearded black African man dressed in a green outfit with white collar and lace trimming. The face appears to be the likeness of a particular individual. It is not clear what the role of this figure is. He is likely not a guard nor a page. It is not clear whether he is linked to the character dressed in a gaudy red outfit with a large ruffed collar and moronic grin next to him. They could be court entertainers, but the expression of the African man seems to be too serious for this.

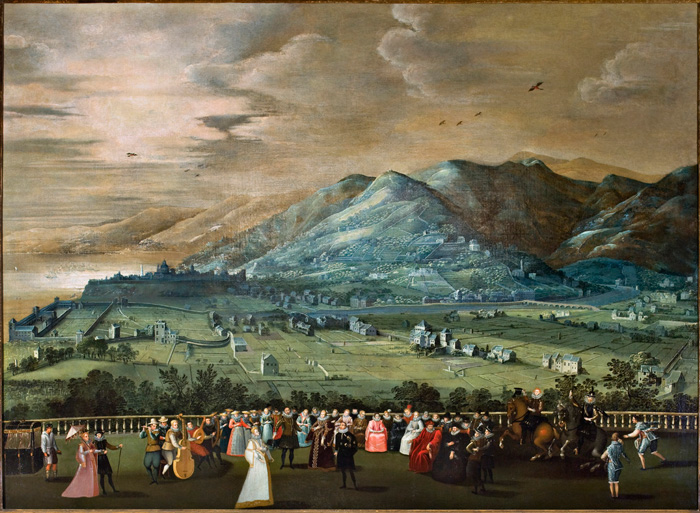
Archduke of Austria and Margaret of Austria at a reception ball in Genoa

The painting of the Archduke of Austria and Isabella of Austria at a reception ball in Genoa was painted in collaboration with his brother Antoni. The painting consists of two planes: on the foreground is shown a lively gathering of elegantly dressed people in distinctive poses while in the back there is a wide landscape occupying three quarters of the composition. On the mountain in the distance a profile of Genoa is depicted. It is possible that Guilliam was responsible for the portraits, which are very delicately rendered with a lot of detail while the collar and other parts which do not display the same lightness of touch were executed by Antoni.
