= Gilliam Dandoy =

Flemish painter

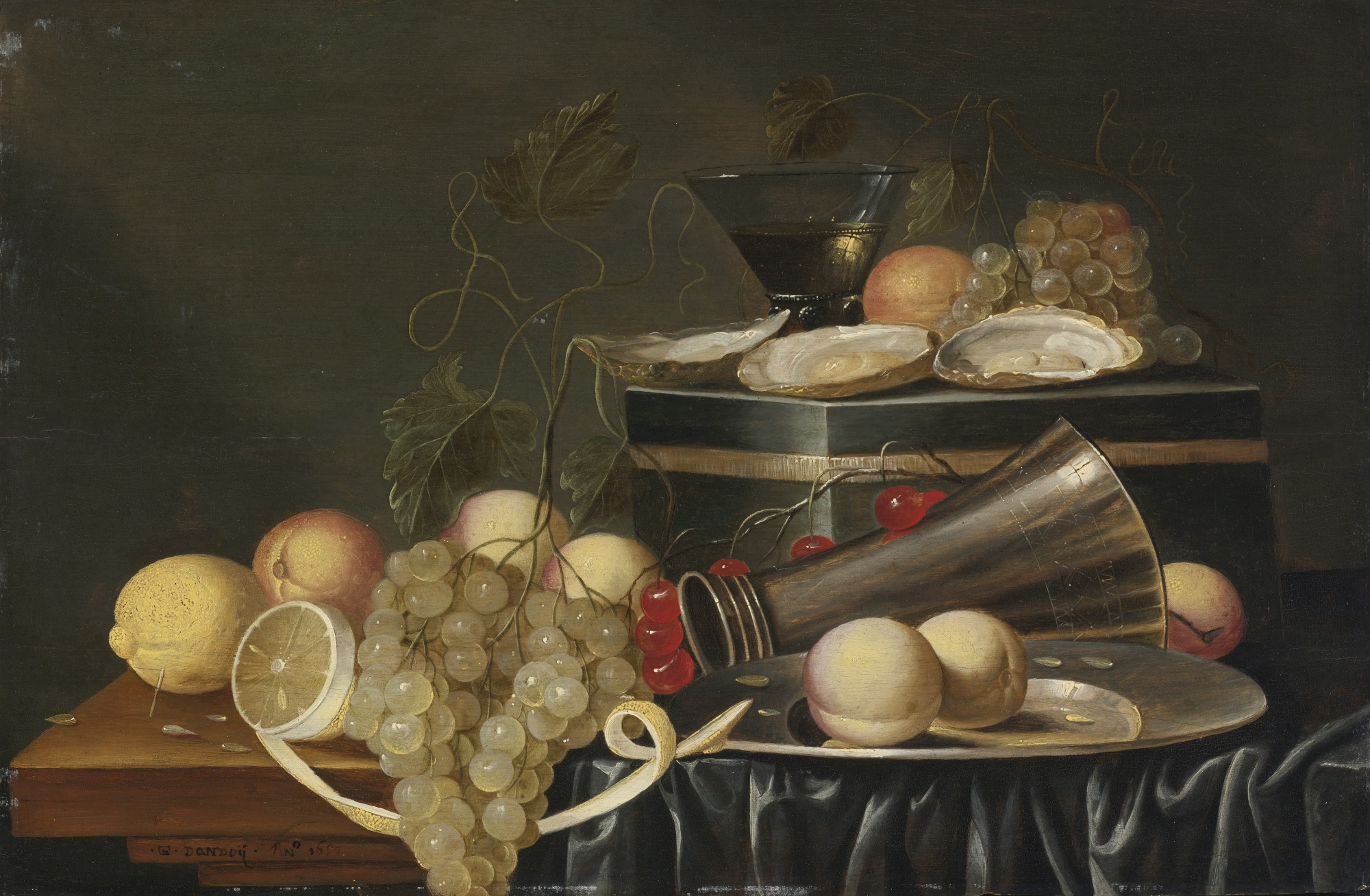
Still life with oysters, grapes, lemons, peaches, and cherries

Gilliam Dandoy (fl. 1640–1654) was a Flemish painter and draughtsman. He worked in Antwerp where he specialized in banquet-style still lifes.

== Life ==
Details about the life of Gilliam Dandoy are scarce. Date and place of birth are not recorded. He appears for the first time in the records in 1640 when he is registered in the Antwerp Guild of St. Luke as a pupil of the prominent still life painter Frans Ykens. He is believed to have been active in Antwerp.

The last dated record related to Dandoy is a signed fruit still life on panel dated 1652, which was auctioned on 28 April 1965 at Sotheby's. A Still Life with Oysters, Grapes, Lemons, Peaches, and Cherries auctioned at Sotheby's (New York, 31 January 2013, lot 233) is possibly dated to 1654.

== Work ==
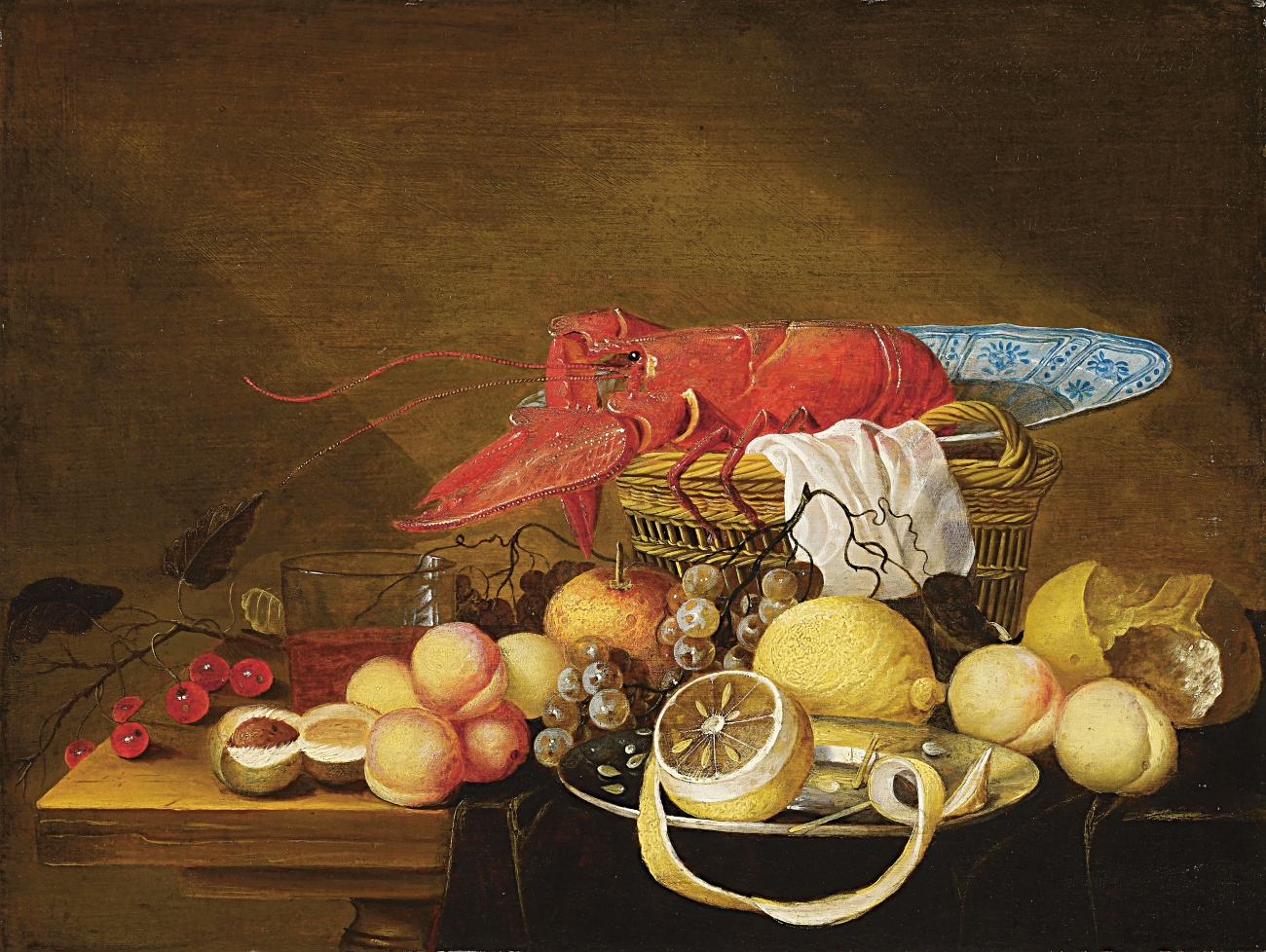
Still life with bread and lobster

Dandoy was a still life painter of banquet-style still lifes in the style of Joris van Son and Jan Davidsz. de Heem. Only a few signed still lifes of Dandoy are reported so far. Ten signed paintings only carry the initials of his first name.

Because of the closeness in style to these masters, Dandoy's unsigned works have regularly been attributed to Joris van Son and even Jan Davidsz. de Heem. Some of his paintings have mistakenly been attributed to G. van Deynum, another follower of de Heem active in Antwerp in the 1650s. His Still life with fruits and glasses on a table auctioned at Thierry de Maigret on 11 June 2010 (Paris, lot 31) has previously been attributed to circle of de Heem.

An autographed still life with fruits and oysters on canvas dated to 1652 was auctioned at Sotheby's on 28 May 1965. That still life is very similar to a Still life with bread and lobster auctioned at Lempertz on 21 November 2009 (Vienna lot 1062). In particular the depiction of lemons in both pictures is very similar. Characteristic of Dandoy's work is the decorative arrangement of objects on several levels and the bright lighting of the arrangements.
