= Pierre Rousselot =

French Jesuit and author (1878– 1915)

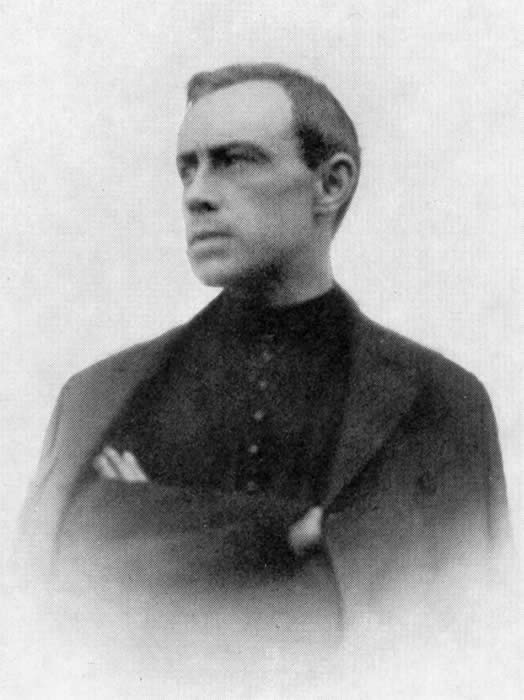
Pierre Rousselot

Pierre Marie Jean Jules Rousselot (French: [pjɛʁ ʁuslo]; 29 December 1878 Nantes – 25 April 1915) was a French Jesuit who was killed in battle during the First World War. He was the author of Les yeux de la foi and was also a great influence upon Henri de Lubac.

== Life ==
Born at Nantes, France, Rousselot entered the Society of Jesus in October 1895. He was ordained priest on 24 August 1908 at Hastings. The same year he had obtained a doctorate for two theses presented to the Sorbonne: L'intellectualisme de saint Thomas and Pour l'histoire du probleme de l'amour au Moyen Age. In November 1909 he entered the Institut Catholique at Paris; he was given the chair of dogmatic theology in the following year, which he occupied till he was called to military service in 1914, apart from a year (1912–13) spent in England. He was killed in battle at Éparges, on 25 April 1915, aged 37.

== Works ==
Rousselot's L’intellectualisme de saint Thomas drew attention to the continuing vitality in Thomas' synthesis of Christian Platonism.

Rousselot suggested a new concept of revelation: that revelation be conceived not as a sum total of distinct truths, propositions, judgements, but as a kind of knowledge that is indefinitely cashable (monnayable) in distinct ideas and propositions which explicitate it without being able to exhaust it, and without claiming to supplement it. Revelation, he proposed, was the living and loving knowledge that the apostles had of Jesus. The mode in which the many dogmas are precontained in the single changeless knowledge which is the apostolic deposit is not logical, but Christological. De Lubac's contribution to the question of doctrinal development is largely a restatement of that of Rousselot, whose papers he studied and published.

== Bibliography ==
=== Primary ===
- L'intellectualisme de saint Thomas, (Paris, 1908; 2nd ed. 1921). [2 English translations have been made: (1) The intellectualism of Saint Thomas, translated by Rev. Fr. James E. O'Mahony O.M.Cap, (1935); (2) Intelligence: Sense of Being, Faculty of God, trans and ed Andrew Tallon, (Madison, WI, 1998)]
- Pour l'histoire du probleme de l'amour au Moyen Age, (Munster, 1907). [English translation: Pierre Rousselot, The Problem of Love in the Middle Ages: A Historical Contribution, translated and with an introduction by Alan Vincelette (Milwaukee, WI: Marquette University Press, 1998)]
- "Amour spirituel et synthèse apperceptive." Revue de philosophie (March 1910) 225-240
- "L'etre et l'esprit." Revue de philosophie (June 1910) 561-574
- "Les yeux de la foi." Recherches de science religieuse (1910) 241-259, 444-475. [English translation: The eyes of faith, translated by Joseph Donceel, with an introduction by John M. McDermott, (New York, 1990)]
- "La metaphysique thomiste et la critique de la connaissance." Revue neo-scolastique (1910) 476-409
- "Remarques sur l'histoire de la notion de foi naturelle." Recherches de science religieuse (1913) 1-36
- "La religion chretienne." Christus, manuel d'histoire des religions, ed. J. Huby. 1912. 3rd ed. 1921
- "Réponse à deux attaques", Recherches de science religieuse 5, (1914), 57-69 [English translation: Answer to two attacks, translated and with an introduction by Avery Dulles, (New York, 1990)]
- "Intellectualisme." Dictionnaire apologetique (1914) 2:col. 1066-1080
- 'Note sur le développement du dogme', Recherches de science religieuse, 37 (1950), 113-20
- "Petite théorie du développement du dogme", ed Henri de Lubac, Recherches de science religieuse 53, (1965), 355-90 [this was a 1909 essay by Rousselot, published posthumously]
- John M McDermott, "Un inédit de P. Rousselot: 'Idealisme et thomisme.'" Archives de Philosophie 42 (1979): 91-126

=== Secondary ===
- Hans Boersma, Nouvelle théologie and sacramental ontology: a return to mystery, (Oxford: OUP, 2009), pp67–82
- Robert N St Hilaire, ‘Desire Divided: Nature and Grace in the Neo-Thomism of Pierre Rousselot’, (PhD diss, Harvard Divinity School, 2008)
- Gerald A McCool, From Unity to Pluralism: The Internal Evolution of Thomism, (1989), pp39–58
- Gerald A McCool, The Neo-Thomists, (1994), pp97–114
- John M McDermott, Love and Understanding: The Relation of Will and Intellect in Pierre Rousselot’s Christological Vision, (Rome, 1983)
- John M McDermott, ‘De Lubac and Rousselot’, Gregorianum 78, (1997), 735-59
- Aidan Nichols, ‘Henri de Lubac and Pierre Rousselot’, in From Newman to Congar: the idea of doctrinal developmentfrom the Victorians to the Second Vatican Council, (Edinburgh, 1990) pp195–213
- P. de Grandmaison. Notice sur le P. Rousselot, et bibliographie de ses ecrits - printed as the introduction to the second edition of Pierre Rousselot, L'Intellectualisme de saint Thomas, (Paris: Gabriel Beauchesne, 1924)
- J. Lebreton. "Rousselot (Pierre)." Dictionnaire de theologie catholique, (Paris: Librarie Letouzey et Ane), 1939. 14:col. 134-138
