= G. van Deynum =

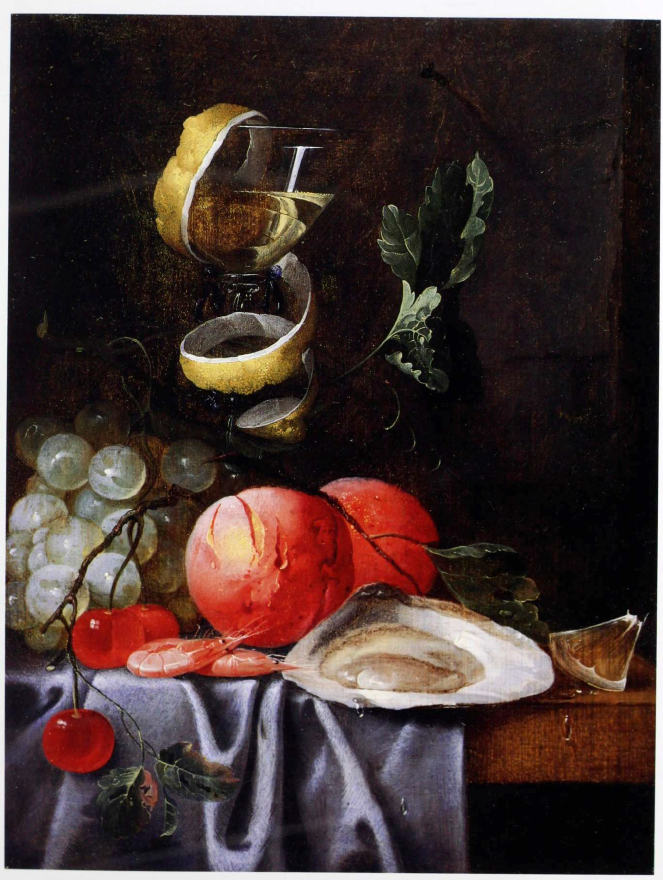
A wine glass and fruits on a table

G. van Deynum (fl. 1650-1659) was a still life painter active in Antwerp in the 1650s. Only a dozen works by his hand have been identified to date. Van Deynum painted banquet style still lifes and vanitas still lifes.

== Life ==
Nothing is known about the life of G. van Deynum. Only the first initial of his name is known. He is in some sources referred to as 'Guilliam van Deynum'. He is believed to have been a member of the family of artists active in Antwerp, which included the miniaturists Jan Baptist and Abraham van Deynum. His activity in Antwerp in the 1650s is known from one work dated 1654.

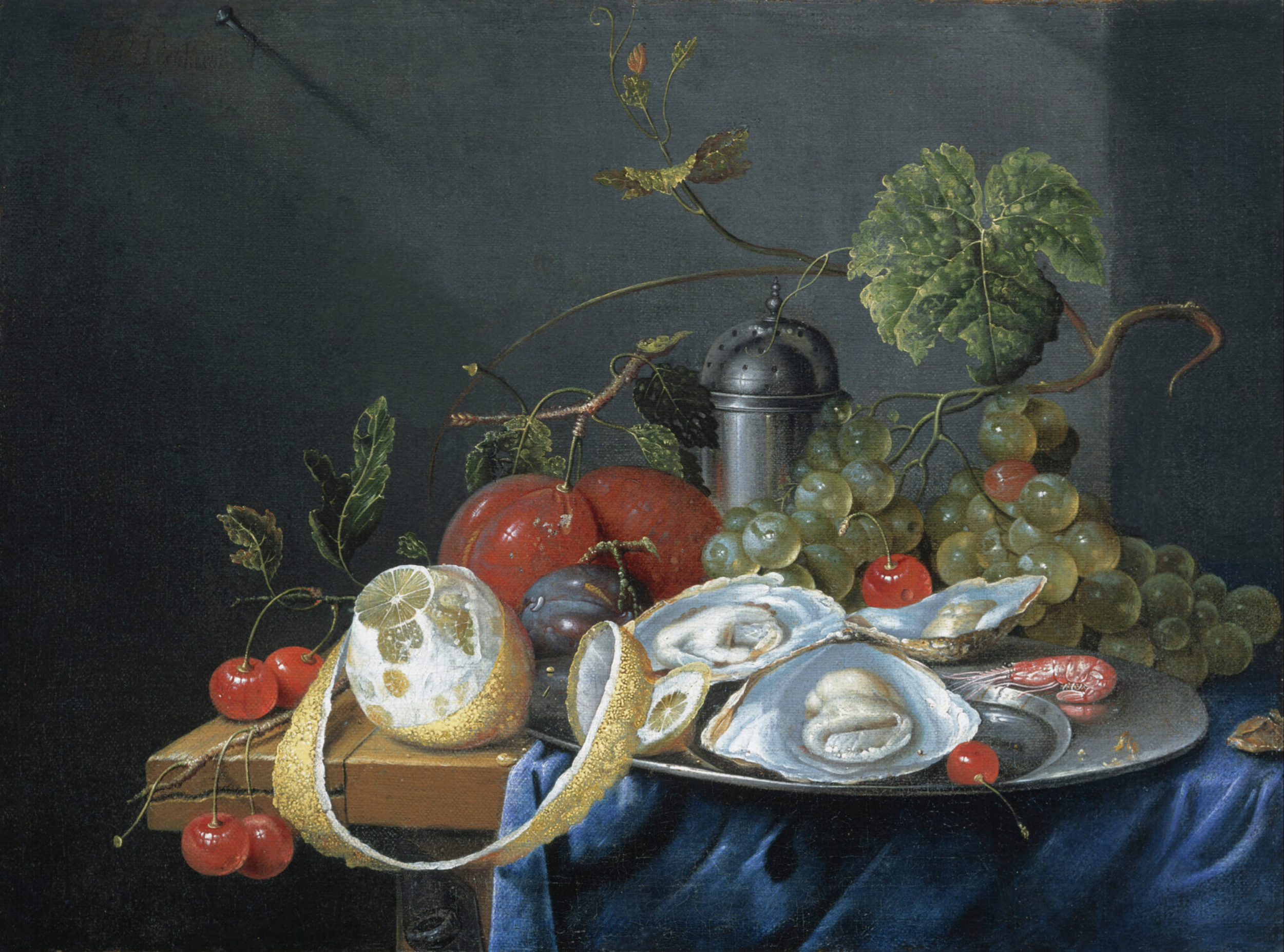
Still life with fruit and oysters

G. van Deynum is sometimes confused with the artist Gerard (Gerrit) van Deynen who worked in The Hague and was possibly the father or brother of the still life painter Isaac van Duynen. He is sometimes also confused with the Flemish portrait painter Guilliam van Deynum.

== Work ==
Only about 10 to 15 works have been attributed to this artist. He mainly painted small still lifes of fruit and some pronkstillevens (sumptuous still lifes). A single vanitas still life has been attributed to him.

His work shows the influence of Jan Davidszoon de Heem, a Dutch still life painter who was active in Antwerp from the mid-1630s. Some of van Duynum's still lifes copied elements of compositions by de Heem from the late 1640s and early 1650s. Some of the works of van Deynum have been attributed to van Heem and have been falsely signed as de Heem.

Some of his works have also been attributed to Gilliam Dandoy, another Flemish follower of de Heem working in Antwerp.

The artist was particularly skilled at rendering surface textures and light effects.

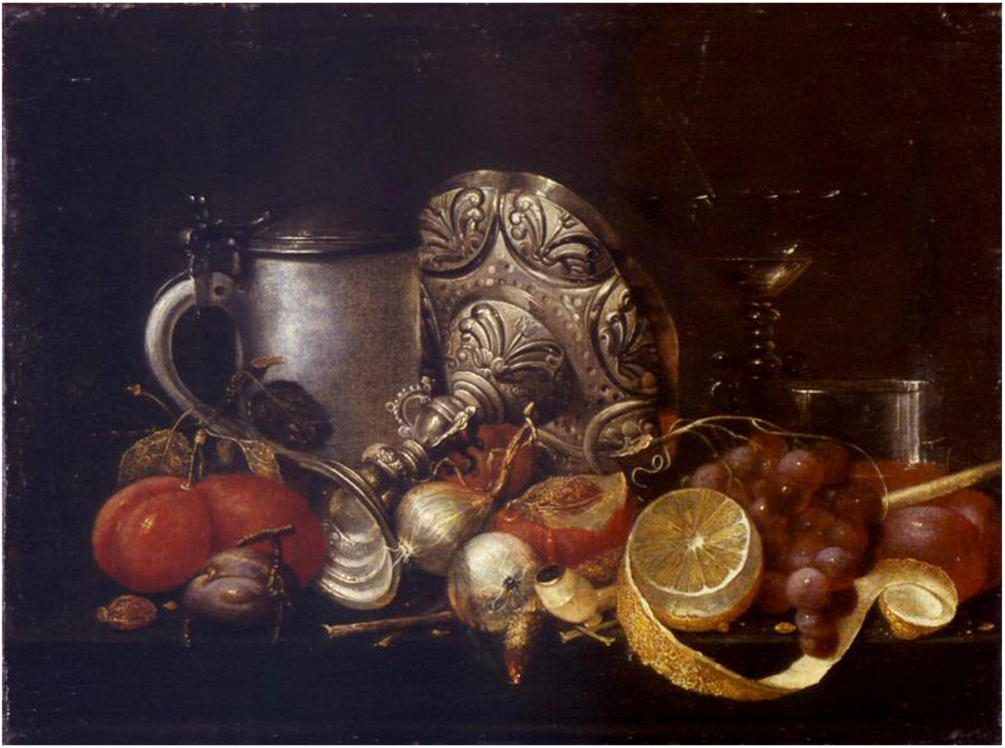
Still life with a pipe and a tumbler
