= Brahmabandhav Upadhyay =

Indian Bengali theologian, journalist and freedom fighter

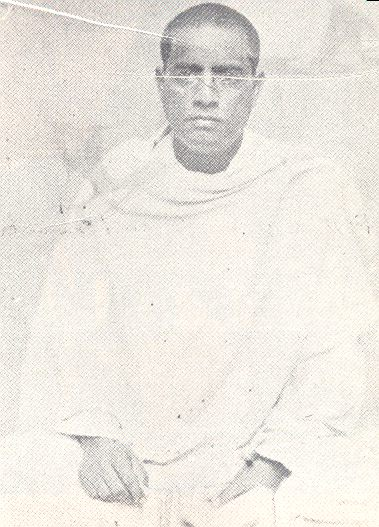
- Born: 11 February 1861; Khanyan, District – Hooghly, Bengal, British India
- Died: 27 October 1907 (aged 46); Calcutta, Bengal, British India
- Occupations: Theologian and Nationalist leader)

Brahmabandhav Upadhyay (born Bhavani Charan Bandyopadhyay) (11 February 1861 – 27 October 1907) was an Indian Bengali theologian, journalist and freedom fighter. He was closely attached with Keshub Chandra Sen, classmate of Swami Vivekananda and close acquaintance of Rabindranath Tagore.

== Early life ==
Brahmabandhab Upadhyay was born as Bhavani Charan Bandyopadhyay in a Kulin Brahmin family. His father, Debi Charan Bandyopadhyay was a police officer of the British regime. Debicharan had three sons. The eldest was Hari Charan, who became a doctor in Calcutta, the second was Parbati Charan who practiced as a pleader, and the third was Bhavani Charan. He was born in village Khannyan in Hooghly district of undivided Bengal (presently in West Bengal). Bhavani Charan lost his mother Radha Kumari when he was only one year of age and was raised by one of his grand mothers.

Bhavani Charan received his education in institutions such as Scottish Mission School, Hooghly Collegiate School, Metropolitan Institution (now Vidyasagar College), and the General Assembly's Institution (now Scottish Church College) in Calcutta. In the General Assembly's Institution, during the 1880s, he was in the same class with Narendranath Dutta, who, at a later date, became Swami Vivekananda. He was a friend of Rabindranath Tagore.

== Varied religious orientations ==
=== Born a Brahmin ===
Bhavani Charan hailed from a religious Hindu Brahmin family. At 13 he had undergone the Upanayana ceremony, the investiture of the sacred thread necessary to mark the coming of age of a Brahmin boy.

=== Adoption of Brahmoism ===
While he was in the college, he was inclined to Brahmoism, under the influence of Keshub Chandra Sen and Debendranath Tagore, the father of Rabindranath Tagore. In 1881 he adopted Brahmoism and became a preacher. He went to Hyderabad town of the province of Sindh (presently in Pakistan) as a school teacher of a Brahmo school.

=== Deeply Christian ===
When Keshub Chandra Sen died in the year 1884, Bhavani Charan came back and slowly got inclined to Christianity. In February 1891, he was baptized a Christian by the Reverend Heaton of Bishop's college, an Anglican clergyman, and six months later, conditionally, in the Catholic Church of Karachi. It was a remarkable journey in his life exploring the theological beliefs and ideologies which did not end there being converted to Catholicism, though, during this phase, he was successful in attracting a large number of educated Bengali Hindu youth to be converted to Christianity.

In 1894, Bhavani Charan adopted this name, Brahmabandhab Upadhyay, declaring himself as a Christian Sannyasi (Monk). Latinized form of the Greek name Θεοφιλος (Theophilos), taken from Bhabani Charan's baptised name Theophilus, which meant "friend of god", derived from θεος (theos) "god" and φιλος (philos) "friend". "Upadhyay" is close to mean a Teacher.

In January 1894, Brahmabandhav started editing "Sophia", an apologetical journal, in Karachi. At one time, he shifted his base to Jabalpur in Central Province (now Madhya Pradesh). There he established a Kasthalik Math, a hermitage for the converts. He also initiated the Concord Club and initiated a religious journal titled "Concord." When he shifted his base to Calcutta in 1900, Brahmabandhab lived in a rented house at Beadon Street, Calcutta. Within a short distance was Bethune Row, where he had established his office to run his weekly magazine "Sophia". He published a series of articles through which he defended the Catholic Church and its manifestations.

Brahmabandhab claimed himself to be called a Hindu Catholic, and wore saffron clothes, walked barefoot and used to wear an ebony cross around his neck. In 1898 he argued in an article titled "Are we Hindus?", "By birth, we are Hindu and shall remain Hindu till death. .. We are Hindus so far as our physical and mental constitution is concerned, but in regard to our immortal souls we are Catholic. We are Hindu Catholic."

Brahmabandhab envisioned an indigenous church in India embracing the fundamental manifestation of Indian living. He is identified as one of the first Christians propagating Sannyasi lifestyle in Ashram.

Brahmabandhab toured England and Europe during 1902–3. The Archbishop of Calcutta gave him a recommendation: "By means of this statement we declare Brahmabandhav (Theophilus) Upadhyay, a Calcutta Brahmin, to be a Catholic of sound morals, burning with zeal for the conversion of his compatriots."

=== Socially remaining a Hindu ===
In course of time, Brahmabandhab's attachment to Hinduism became evident. In August 1907, two months before his untimely death, he declared to undergo prāyaścitta (expression of reparation in Hindu custom) through a public ceremony for the purpose of readmission into the Hindu society (Samaj), completing a full circle in his religious voyage throughout his life, while explicitly remaining a Catholic Christian by his faith.

== Social activities ==
While Bramhabandhab was in Brahmosamaj, he initiated a boys' school in Sindh in the year 1888. He also taught for some time in Union Academy, which was established 1887 as the "Bengalee Boys High School" founded in Shimla under the chairmanship of Sir Nripendra Nath Sircar. He brought out a monthly journal titled The Twentieth Century in association with Nagendranath Gupta (1861–1940).

Brahmabandhab and his disciple Animananda started a school in Kolkata in 1901. The aim of the school was to teach and propagate the Vedic and Vedantic ideas of life along with modern education among the elite class of the society. Rabindranath Tagore was very much attracted to this idea of reviving the old Indian ideal of paedagogy and offered them to shift their school to Santiniketan in his father's estate. This way Tagore's school at Shantiniketan was conceived, which later became known and famous as Viswa Bharati. There were three teachers, namely Reba Chand, Jagadananda Roy, and Shibdhan Vidyarnab, apart from Rabindranath and Brahmabandhab, and there were five students, namely, Rathindranath Tagore, Gourgobinda Gupta, Premkumar Gupta, Ashok Kumar Gupta and Sudhir Chandra Nun. This collaboration could not continue for long and in 1902 Brahmabandhab and Animananda left Shantiniketan.

From 1902 to 1903 Brahmabandhab toured Europe. He lectured at Oxford and Cambridge Universities and preached Vedantism. When he came back, he saw Bengal as a hot seat of political activities, and he too fervently plunged into the political doldrums. He was gradually coming to the conclusion that before India could become Catholic, she must be politically free. His journal "Sofia" soon became the strongest critique of the British imperialism.

== Patriotic activities ==
When he was in high school, Bhavani Charan became inclined toward the Indian nationalist movement for freedom, and during his college education, he plunged into the freedom movement. His biographer, Julius Lipner, says that Brahmabandhab "made a significant contribution to the shaping of the new India whose identity began to emerge from the first half of the nineteenth century". He was contemporary to and friend of the poet Rabindranath Tagore and Vivekananda. According to Lipner, "Vivekananda lit the sacrificial flame or revolution, Brahmabandhab in fuelling it, safeguarded and fanned the sacrifice."

Brahmabandhab Upadhyay acted as editor of Sandhya, till the last day of his life. After the movement of partition of Bengal in 1905, there was a boost in nationalist ideologies and several publications took active and fierce role in propagating them, including Sandhya.

In March 1907, Sandhya elaborated its motto, "If death comes in the striving, the death will be converted to immortality." In May 1907, Sandhya reported, "People are soundly thrashing a feringhi whenever they are coming across one. And here whenever a feringhi is seen the boys throw a brickbat at him. And thrashing of European soldiers are continuing..." Further it added, "Listen and you will hear the Mother's trumpet are sounding. Mother's son do not tarry, but to get ready; go about from village to village and prepare the Indians for death." In September 1907 Sandhya wrote, "God gives opportunities to all nations to to [sic] free themselves from their stupor and strength to make the necessary beginning." Bramhabandhab wrote in Sandhya on 26 October 1907, a day before his death, "I will not got to the jail of the feringhi to work as a prisoner.. I had never been at any one's beck and call. I obeyed none. At the fag end of my old age they will send me to jail for law's sake, and I will work for nothing. Impossible! I won't go to jail, I have been called."

== Arrest, trial and death ==
On 10 September 1907, Bramhabandhab was arrested and prosecuted on a charge of sedition. His articles were found to be inflammatory. Bramhabandhab refused to defend himself in the court, and on 23 September 1907 a statement was submitted through his counsel to the court, Barrister Chittaranjan Das:

I accept the entire responsibility of the publication, management and conduct of the newspaper Sandhya and I say that I am the writer of the article, Ekhan theke gechi premer dai which appeared in the Sandhya on the 13th August 1907, being one of the articles forming the subject matter of this prosecution. But I do not want to take part in the trial, because I do not believe that, in carrying out my humble share of the God appointed mission of Swaraj, I am in any way accountable to the alien people, who happen to rule over us and whose interest is, and necessarily be, in the way of our true national development.

During the trial, Brahmabandhab reported pain in his abdomen and was admitted to the Campbell Hospital of Calcutta. He had undergone a hernia operation but could not overcome his sufferings and succumbed to death on 27 October 1907 under a precarious situation at the age of 46 only.

A detailed account of the last moments of Brahmabandhab Upadhyay and the funeral procession to the cremation ground can be found in Animananda, The Blade (p. 173–178):

The news of his death spread fast and crowds began to gather at the Campbell Hospital. Due to the increasing number of people and mounting excitement, hospital authorities decided to remove the body from the hospital premises. Upadhyay's body was carried from the hospital and was placed on the roadside under a tree while further preparations were made. His friends and relatives carried the body in a flower-decked bier towards the Sandhya office, occasionally stopping on the way. Nearly five thousand people had gathered when the funeral process started from the Sandhya office at around 4 p.m. The procession, chanting bande mataram, proceeded to the cremation ground. When the body reached the cremation ground, patriotic songs were sung and a number of poignant speeches were made. Since Upadhyay had no offspring, the funeral pyre was lit by his nephew, following Hindu custom. Songs continued to be sung and people came up to the pyre to pay homage till well into the night.

== Primary bibliography (Writings) ==
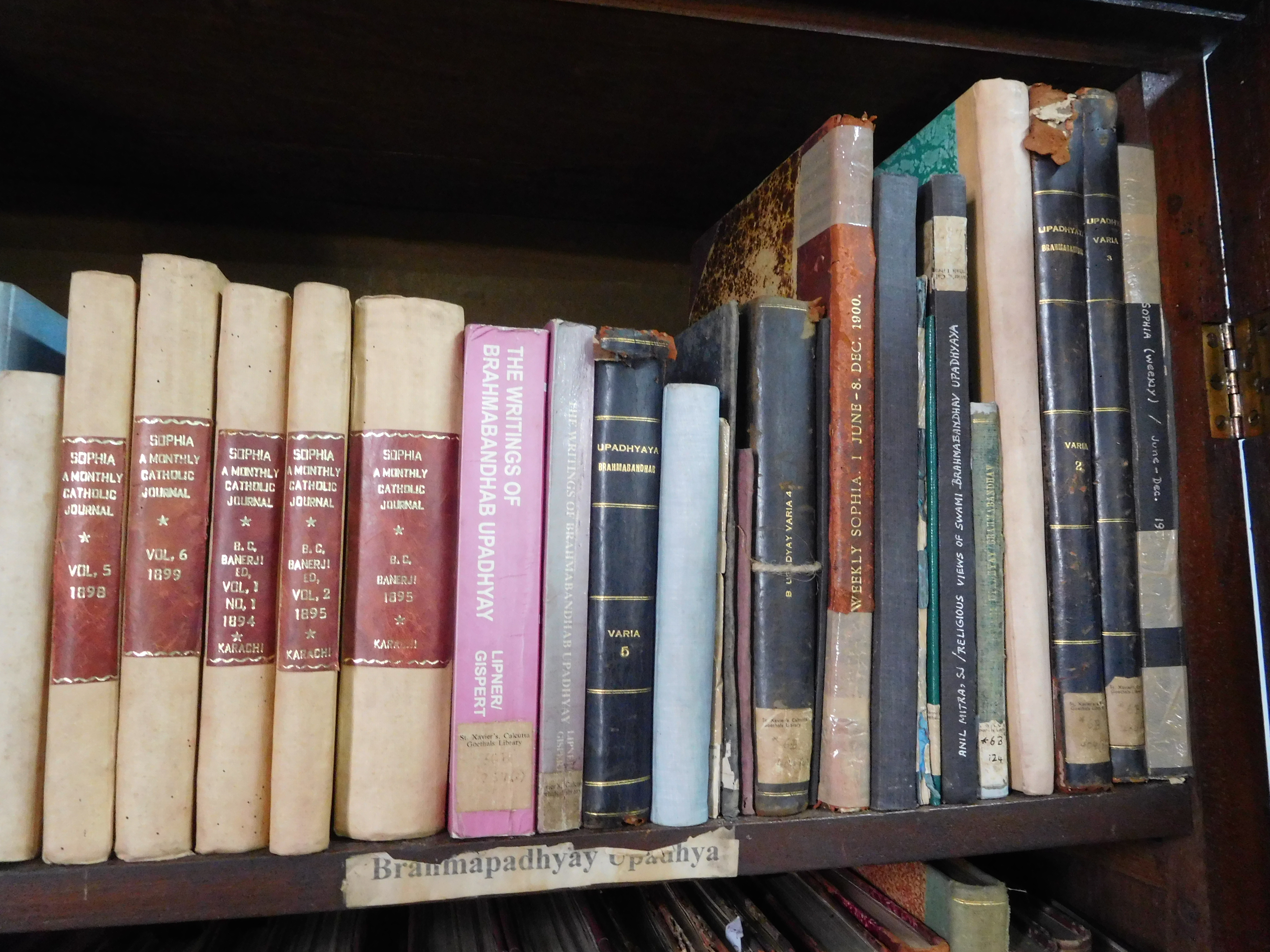
The collected writings of Bramhabandhab Upadhyay (in Goethals Library, Kolkata)

- Hundreds of articles in Bengali and English in short-lived journals and magazines of Bengal such as Sophia, Jote, Sandhya, The Twentieth Century, Swaraj, etc.
- The Writings of Brahmabandhab Upadhyay (ed. by J.Lipner and G.Gispert-Sauch), 2 vols., Bangalore, 1991 and 2001.

== Secondary bibliography ==
- Aleaz, K.P. (1979), "The Theological Writings of Brahmabandhav Upadhyaya Re-Examined" (PDF), Indian Journal of Theology, April–June
- Animananda (1908), The Blade: Life and Work of Brahmabandhab Upadhyay., Roy & Sons
- Animananda (1946), Swami Upadhyay Brahmabandhab: A Story of His Life, Part-I, The Author
- Bhattacharya, Ramkrishna (April 2008), "Brahmabandhav Upadhyay: The Unvanquished Publicist", 175th Year Commemoration Volume, Scottish Church College
- Chandrakunnel, Mathew (2005), "The Search for Truth: Trials and tribulations of Brahmabandhab Upadhyay" (PDF), International Journal of Culture, Philosophy & Theology, 2:12
- Collins, Paul M (2007), Christian Inculturation in India, Ashgate Publishing, ISBN 978-075-466-076-7
- Desai, Phalguni P (2010), "Tagore's Educational Experiments and Right to Education Bill: a Comparison", Rupkatha Journal on Interdisciplinary Studies in Humanities, 2:4, ISSN 0975-2935
- Firth-Smith, William Alan (2011), "Brahmabandhab Upadhyay: An Enigmatic Catholic Freedom Fighter 1861–1907" (PDF), Thesis Submitted in Partial Fulfilment of the Requirement for the Degree of Master of Theology
- Lipner, Julius (1999), Brahmabandhab Upadhyay: The Life and Thought of a Revolutionary, Delhi: Oxford University Press India
- Patel, Hitendra (2008), Khudiram Bose: Revolutionary Extraordinaire, Publications Division, Ministry of Information and Broadcasting, Government of India, ISBN 978-812-301-539-2
- Rao, Madhusudhan (2001), "Lessons from India – Brahmabandhab Upadhyay and the failure of Hindu Christianity" (PDF), International Journal of Frontier Missions, 4:18
- Sebastian, V (2008), "Constructions of National Space: Tracing the Development of Upadhyay's Nationalist Thought", Jnanadeepa – Pune Journal of Religious Studies, 1:11
- Sen, Simonti (2005), Travels to Europe – Self and other in Bengali Travel Narratives 1870 – 1910, New Delhi: Orient Longman, p. 18, ISBN 81-250-2738-6
- Zacharias, H. C. E. (1933), Renascent India from Rammohan Roy to Mohandas Gandhi, London: George Allen Unwin Ltd.
- De Smet, Richard. "Upadhyay's Interpretation of Sankara." Understanding Sankara: Essays by Richard De Smet. Ed. Ivo Coelho. Delhi: Motilal Banarsidass, 2013. 454–462.
- Doyle, Sean. Light of the East: The Calcutta School of Jesuit Indology on Hindu Advaita Non-Dualism. Boston College: Jesuit Sources, 2026.
- Nayak, Biren Kumar. "The Christology of Brahmabandhab Upadhyay in an Advaitic Framework." Asia Journal of Theology 22/1 (April 2008) 107–125.
- Lipner, Julius. "A Case-Study in 'Hindu Catholicism': Brahmabandhav Upadhyay (1861–1907)." Zeitschrift fur Missionswissenschaft und Religionswissenschaft 72 (1988) 33–54. [Amaladass and Young 374.]
- Pulikkan, Jiby. "Brahmabandhab Upadhyay: An Indian Christian for All Times and Seasons." Vidyajyoti Journal of Theological Reflection 71/10 (2007) 777–786.
- "Editorial: Swami Brahmabandhab Upadhyay." Vidyajyoti Journal of Theological Reflection 71/10 (2007) 721–724.
- Gispert-Sauch, G. "Note: Four Little Poems by Brahmabandhab Upadhyay." Vidyajyoti Journal of Theological Reflection 71/9 (2007) 689–695.
- Gispert-Sauch, G. "Note: Brahmabandhab Upadhyay on Notovitch." Vidyajyoti Journal of Theological Reflection 71 (2007) 624–625.
- Lipner, Julius J. "Brahmabandhab Upadhyay (1861–1907) and his Significance for our Times." Vidyajyoti Journal of Theological Reflection 71/3 (2007) 165–184.
- Fernando, Leonard. "Brahmabandhab Upadhyay and Sind Catholic Community." Studies on the History of the Church in India: Festschrift for Dr Joseph Thekkedathu, SDB. Ed. Joy Kaipan. Bangalore: Kristu Jyoti Publications, 2011. 184–202.
- Raj, Felix. "Brahmabandhab Upadhyay (1861–1907): A Prophet for All Seasons." Vidyajyoti Journal of Theological Reflection 82 (2018) 888–892.
- Bagal, Jogescandra. Brahmabandhab Upadhyay. Calcutta: Bangiya Sahitya Parisat, 1964.
- Debsarma, Bolai. Brahmabandhab Upadhyay. Calcutta: Prabartak Publishers, 1961.
- Guha, Manoranjan. Brahmabandhav Upadhyay. Siksa Niketan, Bardhaman, 1976.
- Lavarenne, Christian, "Swâmi Brahmabandhab Upadhyay (1861–1907) : Théologie chrétienne et pensée du Védânta", Ph.D. diss. Université de Provence 1991, Lille : Atelier National de Reproduction des Thèses, 1992, 3 vol., 750 p.
- Mukhopadhyay, Uma. India's Fight for Freedom or the Swadeshi Movement (1905–06). Calcutta, 1958.
- Painadath, Sebastian and Jacob Parappally, eds. A Hindu-Catholic: Brahmabandhab Upadhyay's Significance for Indian Christian Theology. Bangalore: Asia Trading Corporation, 2008.
- Joseph, P. V. An Indian Trinitarian Theology of "Missio Dei": Insights from St. Augustine and Brahmabandhab Upadhyay." Eugene, Oregon, 2019.
- Spendlove, Gregory Blake. A Critical Study of the Life and Thought of Brahmabandhab Upadhyay. Deerfield: Trinity International University, 2005.
- Tennent, Timothy C. Building Christianity on Indian Foundations: The Legacy of Brahmabāndhav Upādhyāy. Delhi: ISPCK, 2000.
