= Christian ashram movement =

Religious movement in India

The Christian ashram movement is a movement within Christianity in India that embraces Vedanta and the teachings of the East, attempting to combine the Christian faith with the Hindu ashram model and Christian monasticism with the Hindu sannyasa tradition.

== Origin and spread ==
The "father" of the Christian ashram movement was 17th-century Italian Jesuit priest Roberto de Nobili, a Christian missionary to India who decided to overcome the cultural obstacles to his mission by adopting the various forms of a Hindu sannyāsi. He was followed in this – more than two centuries later – by Brahmabandhab Upadhyay, who was not a foreign missionary but an Indian Bengali Brahmin who converted to Catholicism. His writings publicized several ideas in the movement, including the identification of the Saccidananda with the Christian Holy Trinity, an identification coined by Keshub Chandra Sen in 1882. He also founded an ashram, Kasthalic Matha, although it did not last long.

In the footsteps of Upadhyay and Sen (second half of the 20th century) came French priest Jules Monchanin (who was later to adopt the name Parma Arupi Anananda), and French Benedictine monk Henri le Saux (who was later to adopt the name Abhishiktananda), the co-founders of Saccidananda Ashram (also called Shantivanam), an ashram founded in 1950 at Tannirpalli in Tiruchirapalli District and still surviving into the 21st century. Upadhyay was also an influence upon Bede Griffiths, who co-founded Kurisumala Ashram with Belgian Trappist Francis Mahieu and who took over leadership of Saccidananda Ashram after Monchanin's death and le Saux's decision to leave for his hermitage in the Himalayas.

In the late seventeenth, early eighteenth, century, P. Charles François Dolu and Jean-Venance Bouchet designed Catholic ceremonies that integrated Hindu traditions. Bouchet became a noted scholar of Hinduism and adopted Hindu dress, ascetic practices, and vegetarianism.

Many other Christian ashrams now exist in India. By 2004, there were at least 50 of them, including: Saccidananda Ashram (aforementioned), Kurisumala Ashram (aforementioned), Christukula Ashram (located in Tirupattur and also founded by Ernest Forrester Paton and S. Jesudasan, but by Anglicans rather than Roman Catholics, in the 1930s), Christa Prema Seva Ashram (located in Shivajinagar (near Pune) and founded in 1927 by Anglican John "Jack" Winslow), Jyotiniketan Ashram (in Bareilly), and Christi Panti Ashram (in Varanasi). Other ashrams founded by the movement include Sat Tal Ashram (founded by Methodist E. Stanley Jones) and Nava Jeeva Ashram, Founded by Pradhan Acharya John Thannickal in Bangalore.

Whilst Saccidananda and others were founded by Catholics, with some 80 Catholic ashrams existing by 2005, Christa Prema Seva and Christukula were the first two of the (surviving) Protestant ashrams. Backed by the experience of a multisecular monastic tradition the Catholic ashrams have proven more successful than the Protestant. In addition to their greater number, the continuance of Saccidananda Ashram under Bede Griffiths contrasts strikingly with the problems that Protestant ashrams have had under second-generation leadership, as exemplified by the faltering of Christa Prema Seva Ashram (and indeed by the Protestant ashram founded in 1917 by N. V. Tilak at Satra, possibly the very first Protestant ashram, which collapsed upon his death in 1919). Stanley Samartha reported in 1980 that the movement had "almost dried up".

== Conflicts ==
The movement has not been without interreligious friction. Although there was dialogue between Hinduism and Christianity in general in the 1960s, this broke down as few were willing to engage in common meditation or social work practice. The Christian ashram movement, specifically, came under attack from some factions of Hinduism, as can be witnessed from a series of letters exchanged between Bede Griffiths and Swami Devananda – more on which can be found in Catholic Ashrams (Goel 1988). Such criticism from (some) Hindus has been severe; but criticism has also been levelled from the Christian side, where conservative groups within the Catholic Church have regarded the Hindu influences upon Christian ashrams with some suspicion. The view of Indians as a whole appears to be that the Christian ashram movement is mainly "for foreigners"; however the view remains that the movement, at least the Catholic side, will continue in existence and provide (in the words of one commentator quoted by George Soares-Prabhu in 1994) "an important point of contact for dialogue with Hinduism".

Griffiths hoped to restore Christianity to what he considered its roots where meditation and direct experience of God was emphasized, as with the Desert Fathers. Proponents consider this spiritual wisdom to be found in the New Testament, but believe that has been de-emphasised throughout much of Christian history.

While never losing sight of the fact that Jesus is the way to salvation, in the movement the idea (from the New Testament) that "the Kingdom of God is within [or among] you" (Luke 17:21) is married to the Hindu concept of the atman. By allying Christianity with mysticism, the movement seeks to ground faith in direct experience and wisdom arising from the mystical experience of nonduality and thus allow Christianity to return to being a more inwardly-directed religion.

The Second Vatican Council, in its Declaration on Non-Christian Religions, said that "the Church rejects nothing that is true and holy in these religions". In Christian sannyasa, Hindu holy texts such as the Mahabharata and the Puranas are considered to be gifts from God. Brother John Martin Sahajananda summarizes this Roman Catholic teaching as, "All the sacred scriptures are a gift of God to humanity."
