= J. C. Winslow =

English missionary (1882-1974)

Jack Copley Winslow (18 August 1882 – 1974), also known by names John Copley Winslow or J.C. Winslow or John C. Winslow or Jack C. Winslow, was an English Society for the Propagation of the Gospel (SPG) missionary to Konkan and Pune, then-Poona—both part of then-Bombay Presidency. He was an evangelist, hymnist, and the founder of Christa Seva Sangh—interpreted as Community of the Servants of Christ or The Fellowship of the Servants of Christ and/or The Christian Fellowship of Service.

He authored several books, notably, The Eucharist in India a Plea for a Distinctive Liturgy for the Indian Church with a Suggested Form, The Christian approach to the Hindu, Jagadguru, Or the World Significance of Jesus Christ, and alike. As a hymn-writer, he wrote hymns that were published in his Garland of Verse in 1961 and various other hymns for school and church published in various other hymnals like Psalter Hymnal, Hymns Ancient and Modern.

== Biography ==
=== Early life ===
He was born on 18 August 1882 in a religious and evangelists family in the village of Hanworth in Middlesex, England; his father was an Anglican clergyman and Mary Winslow, one of his great-grandmothers, was a renowned evangelist of the nineteenth century.

He was educated at Eton, and did his graduation in Balliol College, Oxford. While studying at Balliol College between 1902 and 1905, he came under the influence of Edward Caird, neo-Hegelian philosopher; Charles Gore, Anglo-Catholic scholar and editor of Lux Mundi; and James Palmer, chaplain of Balliol and later Bishop of Bombay(present Mumbai).

While preparing for ordination after he finished his graduation, he visited India. He looks been impressed by the work of Anglican missionary, who were presenting Christianity in terms of Hindu culture, especially to Western-educated in Delhi and Calcutta. While in Delhi, he met Cambridge Mission to Delhi missionary C.F. Andrews, who later became his mentor. Association with C.F. Andrews had later proven to be decisive factor in his missionary work in Bombay Presidency, especially in establishing the ashram. After he returned England, he spent a year at Wells Theological College, Salisbury, and later worked for four years in the parish of Wimbledon. In 1907, he became a deacon, was ordained a priest in the Church of England in 1908, and then worked as a lecturer for three years preparing new candidates for ordination and overseas service in St Augustine's College, Canterbury.

=== Missionary work ===
In 1914, he was sent as a Society for the Propagation of the Gospel(SPG) missionary to Konkan of Bombay Presidency; initially, he was stationed at Dapoli of Konkan region, 100 miles south of Bombay, where he devoted most of his time in learning Marathi language. He was already licensed to the diocese of Bombay, whose Bishop James Palmer was his tutor at Balliol College and remained his mentor too. Between 1915 and 1919, he served as principal of Mission high school, Ahmednagar, where he got acquainted with Narayan Waman Tilak, an Indian Christian poet in Bhakti tradition who lived in Ahmednagar and was also minister of the American Marathi Mission. From Tilak, he learnt the significance of bhakti, singing bhajans, and Indian devotional songs, for Christian worship and evangelism—With Tilak's conversation, his belief was further reinforced that Hindus would be influenced by the person of Jesus Christ – Tilak was baptised in Bombay for having dissatisfied with Hinduism, and was in search for a religion of love.

He returned to England after twenty years of missionary service between 1914 and 1934 due to conflicts within the ashram and joined Moral Rearmament, an Oxford Group Movement. He wrote a couple of famous Oxford Group books. The Most well known is "When I Awake" (instructions on how to keep the QUIET TIME WITH GOD on a daily basis) His other famous Oxford group book was the short book "Why I believe in the Oxford Group". While in England, he took up parish work, broadcasting and writing work. Later, he became chaplain of Bryanstone School between 1942 and 1948. Between 1948 and 1962, he served as the first chaplain to an evangelical center at Lee Abbey, North Devon.

Final return to India:

Jack Winslow returned to Poona in late January 1974 and spent three weeks visiting the ashram he founded. He died shortly after his return at the age of 91, on 29 March 1974 at Godalming, Surrey. and is buried at Eashing Cemetery close by his sisters Evelyn, Mildred and Violet.

==== Christa Seva Sangha ashram ====
While on furlough in England in 1919, as mentioned in his autobiography, he seems to have had "mysterious experiences" as "revelation or divine guidance" which forcibly implanted upon his mind the importance of ashrams for the Indian church—the factors that aided to shape his conviction were like – Inspiration and influence of C.F. Andrews, Sundar Singh, Narayan Waman Tilak, and Thomas Christians in Kerala to enter deeply into the spirit of India and to identify with its people – With rise of Indian nationalism, he perceived that a Western church with Colonial British Raj support could never win the heart of India; hence, he believed Indian church could show that it welcomed desirable things of Indian religions and culture – Important factor of all, the impact of Jallianwalla Bagh massacre in Amritsar in 1919.

Winslow, having initially decided to start an Anglo-Indian ashram before Jallianwalla Bagh massacre, changed his stance to establish Christa Seva Sangh, a Christian ashram, to heal inter-racial strife. He saw the ashram as a reparation for the racial arrogance among the missionaries. He believed that Christian ashram would enable British and Indian Christians live side by side. In his own words:

I had been trifling with my fancy for an Anglo-Indian ashram before Amritsar. Amritsar sealed it for ever. I . . . [saw] it as an answer to Amritsar. It's the opposite of Amritsar. An ashram where British and Indians live side by side.......

In 1920, he published the details of his vision in the International Review of Missions. He envisaged an Indian church with community ministers—the leader of a community to act as an elder or minister to dispense the sacraments. In matters of discipline and administration, the leader would act in consultation with a panchayat(court) – Over the wider area, a similar system of church government was to prevail with bishop as its head – He envisaged his ashram to follow a pattern followed by Rabindranath Tagore's ashram at Bolpur, then-Bengal – For worship, bhajans and other Indian devotional songs would be sung with local Indian musical instruments – In architecture, churches would follow the design of Hindu temples – On the walls, exemplary figures of different religious traditions would be used like Isaiah in the temple, Gautama Buddha beneath the bodh tree, Sita for wifely faithfulness, and Ruth the Moabite to signify the self-sacrificing affection. He discussed the proposed ashram with his mentor Palmer, and received permission to make that his chosen work.

Upon his return to India in 1920, he garnered a small group of Indian Christians at Ahmednagar to form the initial nucleus of the ashram community called Christa Seva Sangha, The fellowship of the Servants of God and/or The Christian fellowship of Service—literally, it could be interpreted as Christ Service Society – the Society of the Servants belonging to Christ. The Christian ashram Christa Seva Sangha was inaugurated on 11 June 1922 at St. Barnabas' Church, a SPG missionary station. The aims of the society were bhakti devotion and study of sacred texts; and service, especially for the sick and suffering, including evangelical work. Initially, the ashram had only Winslow as a foreigner and rest as Indian Christians, known to him from his work in Ahmednagar. The ashram purpose was to provide a small fellowship where Indians and Europeans could live together in Indian style and spend half the year in study and training at Central ashram and other half in touring for evangelical work. In brief, its object was more on meditation, study of the scriptures, and the development of Indian ways for the expression of Christian life and worship, rather than on social work.

Having sensed Christa Seva Sangha community would collapse in 1926, he used his furlough opportunity in England to raise funds and recruit new community members. He met William Strawan Robertson a.k.a. Father Algy at Student Christian Movement(SCM) held in Swanwick; Robertson, an Anglo-Catholic; and had already worked with W.E.S. Holland at St. Paul's College, Calcutta, looped-in two more SCM friends Verrier Elwin and Fielding-Clarke from Oxford and several laymen to join Winslow in his new ashram. In his own words of Verrie Elwin after joining the ashram:

I joined the Christa Seva Sangh because I understood that its main interests were scholarship, mysticism [and] reparation.

The new community members from Oxford, Cambridge, and several alike joined Christa Seva Sangha with a permanent ashram established at Pune in November 1927. By 1930, the community grew to thirty. The community expanded its ashram activities from prayer, study, evangelism, and service to sick by undertaking literary and educational work in Pune. Winslow, having seen his "ashram's role as an interpreter of the ancient Christian church to India, and of the India to the Christian church of the West", began giving lectures in the city, holding retreats, and running student hostels, and building up the Federation of International Fellowship—for bringing together groups of Hindus, Muslims, Christians, and other alike religious groups for prayer and discussion on social, economic, and political problems the country was facing.

He looks to have been sympathetic with Gandhi and other leaders of Indian national movement, and took on the Indian name Swami Devadatta, the One given by God. Winslow believed that Western Imperialism was holding back the attempt to present Jesus Christ as saviour to Indians, who too often associated Christianity with the British Raj. He wore Khadi, a symbol of Indian nationalism, and hosted lectures at the ashram on non-violence. However, he was not as committed to the National movement as other members of the ashram; sometimes, he had difficulty in defending the community members before the Bombay government—of British Raj.

==== Christa Prema Seva Sangha ashram ====
After Winslow departed to England in 1934 for good, Christa Seva Sangha had split into two ashrams; one, Christa Seva Sangha, based at Oudh with community members supporting Winslow and his ideals; two, Christa Prema Seva Sangha, the Community of the Service of the Love of Christ, based at Poona with community members supporting Franciscan spirituality and Bill Lash as its acharya. Some point out that, when the ashram was established initially, only Winslow was a Westerner and rest were Indian converts. As the ashram grew bigger with more Westerners entering ashram who were influenced by Franciscan movement in the Anglican church, they wanted to form a Franciscan monastic community, very much in line with the European model. In addition, Franciscan spirituality influenced members of the ashram were reluctant to admit the married members of the ashram into its inner circle, while Celibacy was not an issue for Winslow, who was more interested in encouraging British and Indian members of the ashram live together, irrespective of men and women, married and single – and Winslow didn't enforce Celibacy restriction as he felt that it might create a barrier within the ashram. It is believed that Celibacy played a major role in split of the ashram, with Franciscans living in Pune calling themselves as separate Christa Prema Seva Sangha community.

== Christ the fulfiller ==
Winslow in his ashram appears to have started with Fulfilment theology that was popular among Protestant theologians in his time. The Fulfilment theology his ashram community later embodied may be traced back to the Edward Caird's, Charles Gore's, and J. N. Farquhar's influence. Farquhar, one of the pioneers of Fulfilment theology in India, had linked the faith in Christ with religion in India using his publication the Crown of Hinduism. Winslow, strongly influenced by Farquhar's work, also regarded "Hinduism as a religion that could truly come into its own only through devotion to Christ." Winslow having influenced by Tilak's Bhakti movement and Tukaram's verses said:

The verses by Tukaram were "Wonderful Hindu worship" and that they deserved an object of worship more worthy than Shiva and Krishna: "Think what it may become when it is lavished upon Christ, the perfect and satisfying Incarnation of the Invisible God."

William Temple, archbishop, described him as a "great interpreter of Indian mind to England." Andrew Webb saw him as an "erratic genius" who best enshrined the fulfilment theology of the period. According to Eric Sharpe, founding Professor of Religious studies at the University of Sydney, Winslow in his twenty years of missionary between 1914 and 1934, forged a new type of relationship among religions and acclaimed as "Catholic-minded Sadhu Sundar Singh" and a "great Indo-Anglic mystic". Winslow always saw himself as an evangelist and played a major role in the development of the Christian Ashram Movement—though he was influenced by Rabindranath Tagore's ashram Shanti Niketan in Bengal and East Syriac Orthodox Church of present Kerala, there were others who had already started ashrams in India, including Roman Catholics, Protestants, and Indian christians – Brahmabandhab Upadhyay(Real name Bhavani Charan Banerjee and Christian name Theophilus) took baptism in 1888 at Hyderabad, Sindh and migrated to Calcutta to start a small Christian ashram in 1900 with disciples from Sindh Province – Gandhi started Sabarmati Ashram in 1917, though he started Satyagraha Ashram in 1915 itself – Ernest Forrester Paton established Christukula Ashram in 1921 – Jules Monchanin started Saccidananda Ashram(also known by name Shantivanam) in 1938, and alike

== Bibliography ==
In his biography on Narayan Waman Tilak entitled Narayan Vaman Tilak, the Christian poet of Maharashtra, Winslow testified the influence of Tilak on him and how Tilak persuaded him of the importance of Indian ways and ideals for Christian mission. It was also through Tilak's influence, he realised the contribution the church in India had to offer to the world. Winslow quoted Tilak's prophecy as:

Yea, at the end of pregnant strife, Enthroned as Guru of the earth, This land of Hind shall teach the worth Of Christian faith and Christian life.

When Winslow became convinced towards the end of his missionary work at Ahmednagar that Indian christians needed a Eucharistic liturgy that was more Indian in form and spirit than the Anglican liturgy of the Book of Common Prayer, he published new Indian liturgy in 1920 entitled The Eucharist in India a Plea for a Distinctive Liturgy for the Indian Church with a Suggested Form. This liturgy was framed on Oriental models, encouraging Indian converts to develop their own forms of worship. This liturgy was subsequently approved by Liturgical Committee of the Lambeth Conference in 1920. This liturgy was used in any diocese of the Indian church, Church of South India, and later used by the compilers of the liturgies for the church in Sri Lanka.

After the establishment of Christa Seva Sangh, he wrote three books exploring Indian and Christian mysticism. In 1923, he published Christian Yoga containing four devotional addresses already delivered in England. In 1924, he published Jagadguru, the World-significance of Jesus Christ, And in 1926, he wrote The Indian Mystic: Some Thoughts on India's contribution to Christianity.

During Indian national movement, having been sympathetic to the cause of Gandhi, he co-authored The Dawn of Indian Freedom with Verrier Elwin; with this book, he opposed the British government's bullying tactics of missionaries and sang the praises of Gandhi's Satyagraha campaign, and further went to depict Christ as the fulfilment of India's national aspirations. During the Civil disobedience movement between 1930 and 1931, he wrote poem "Hail to the Mother."

=== Works ===
- The Eucharist in India a Plea for a Distinctive Liturgy for the Indian Church with a Suggested Form.
- The Lee Abbey story.
- The Christian approach to the Hindu.
- Narayan Vaman Tilak, the Christian poet of Maharashtra.
- The dawn of Indian freedom.
- Christa Seva Sangha.
- The Indian mystic: some thoughts on India's contribution to Christianity.
- Christian yoga: or, The threefold path of union with God.
- Jagadguru, Or the World Significance of Jesus Christ.
- The eyelids of the dawn: memories, reflections, and hopes.
- Modern miracles.
- A garland of verse.
- A testament of thanksgiving.
- When I awake: thoughts on the keeping of the morning watch.
- Confession and absolution: a short guide for today.
- The Gate of Life: An Inquiry Into Life Beyond Death.
- An Experiment in Christian Fellowship in India.
- Why I believe in the Oxford group.
- The church in action.
- Retreat at Mr. Narottam Morarjee's Bungalow at Juhu.
- Why I believe in the Oxford group.

==== Hymns ====
- Lord of Creation, to thee be all praise
- Lord of Lords, and King eternal
- As now the Day draws near its Ending

== See also ==
- 1920 Lambeth Conferences
- Oxford Movement
- History of Cambridge Mission
