= Colin Forrester-Paton =

Scottish Presbyterian missionary (1918–2004)

The Reverend Colin Forrester-Paton (5 April 1918 – 1 February 2004), born at Alloa, Scotland, was a Church of Scotland missionary in Ghana and later Chaplain to H.M. The Queen in Scotland.

== Education ==
He was born at The Gean, a huge mansion near Alloa, the son of Alexander Forrester Paton (1881-1954) and his wife, Mary Emma Louise Shaw. The Patons were a very rich family and owner of Patons Cotton Thread Mills. The family house was designed by John Melvin & Son in 1912 as a wedding present for his father from his grandfather.

Forrester-Paton was educated in Moffat, at Gresham's School, Holt, and New College, Oxford, where he gained a first class degree (BA, Honours) in 1940. He then trained for the ministry at the United Free Church College, Edinburgh, and at the University of London, graduating with a BD degree in 1943. During the Second World War he was a conscientious objector and served as a fireman.

== Career ==
Between 1943 and 1946 Forrester-Paton was secretary of the Student Christian Movement and became interested in missionary work.

He was ordained as a minister of the United Free Church of Scotland in 1944 and in 1946 was sent to Akropong in the Gold Coast (later called Ghana) by the Church's Missionary Partner Scheme. He taught at the Presbyterian Training College of the Gold Coast and worked for the Presbyterian Church and the Christian Council of Ghana, especially as a translator (having learnt the Twi language and others). He was also stationed at Amedzofe and Sandema in Northern Ghana.

Forrester-Paton left Ghana in 1972 and in 1973 became a Church of Scotland minister in Hawick, Scotland.

In 1981 he was appointed Chaplain to HM the Queen and after his retirement from the active ministry was appointed an Extra Chaplain to HM the Queen in 1988.

== Family ==
In 1943, Forrester-Paton married Jean Lorimer Crichton Miller (1917–1998), who was then working for the Royal Air Force. She joined him in the Gold Coast in 1947 and they had three children: Helen, Keith, and Robin.

Forrester-Paton's grandfather was a rich mill owner, but the family was more concerned with religion than with business and his great-aunt, Catherine Forrester Paton, established a women's missionary training college in Glasgow. One of his uncles was the Ernest Forrester Paton (1891–1970), a Scottish missionary in India.

== Papers of Forrester-Paton ==
- A substantial collection of Forrester-Paton's papers is held at the Centre for the Study of Christianity in the Non-Western World of the University of Edinburgh.
- The National Library of Scotland holds his correspondence and reports home to the Church of Scotland from the Gold Coast, later Ghana, between 1954 and 1971 (Accession number 11977).

== Sources ==
- Colin Forrester-Paton at Mundus
- The papers of Ernest Forrester-Paton
