= Bede Griffiths =

British Catholic priest and monk (1906–1993)

Dom Bede Griffiths OSB Cam
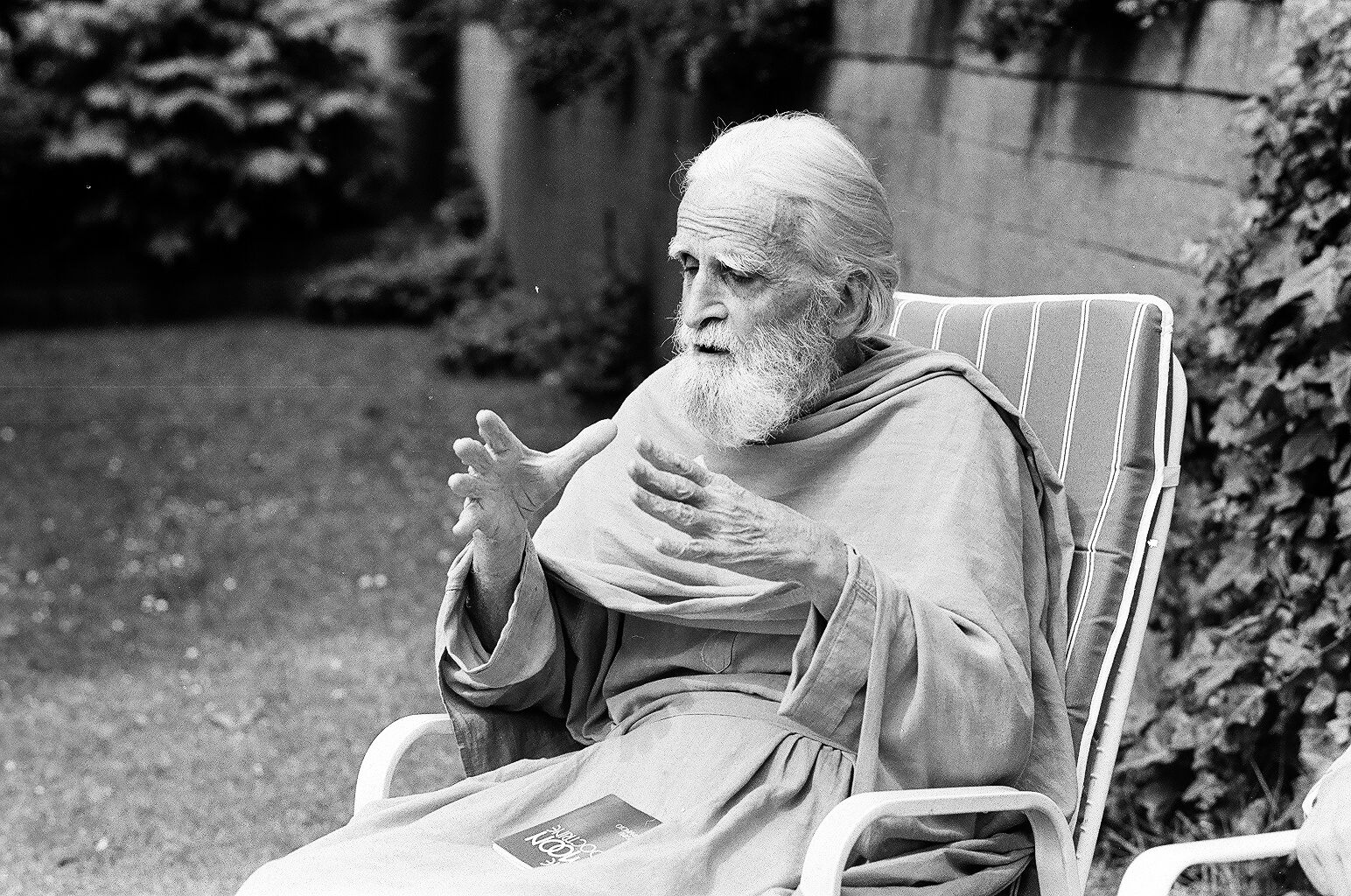
- Griffiths in 1984
- Born: Alan Richard Griffiths; 17 December 1906; Walton-on-Thames, Surrey, England
- Died: 13 May 1993 (aged 86); Shantivanam, Tamil Nadu, India
- Other name: Swami Dayananda
- Education: Magdalen College, Oxford
- Occupations: Catholic priest, monk, mystic, theologian

Bede Griffiths OSB Cam (17 December 1906 – 13 May 1993), born Alan Richard Griffiths and also known by the end of his life as Swami Dayananda ("bliss of compassion"), was a British Catholic priest and Benedictine monk who lived in ashrams in South India and became a noted missionary. Griffiths was a part of the Christian Ashram Movement.

== Life ==
=== Early years ===
Griffiths was born in Walton-on-Thames, Surrey, England, at the end of 1906, the youngest of three children of a middle-class family. Shortly after Griffiths' birth, his father was betrayed by a business partner and was left penniless. His mother took the children and established residence in a smaller home which she maintained, though she had to find work to support herself and the children. At age 12, Griffiths was sent to Christ's Hospital, a private charity school for children from families of modest means. He excelled in his studies and earned a scholarship to the University of Oxford where, in 1925, he began his studies in English literature and philosophy at Magdalen College. In his third year at university he came under the tutelage of C. S. Lewis, who became a lifelong friend. Griffiths graduated from Oxford in 1929 with a degree in journalism.

Shortly after graduation, Griffiths, with fellow Oxford alumni Martyn Skinner and Hugh Waterman, settled in a cottage in the Cotswolds and began what they called an "experiment in common living". They followed a lifestyle attuned to nature, milking cows and selling the milk to support themselves. They would read the Bible together as a form of literature. Griffiths noted a strong connection between the teachings of scripture and the rhythm of the nature around them. The experiment lasted less than a year, as one of the friends found the life too demanding. Nevertheless, the experience had a strong effect on Griffiths.

As a result of this experience, Griffiths decided to seek ordination in the Church of England. He was advised, however, to gain some experience in the slums of London. This advice was so contrary to what Griffiths felt to be his vocation that it drove him to a crisis of faith which nearly drove him to an emotional breakdown. Guided by the writings of Cardinal John Henry Newman, he reached a point in this struggle where he had a spiritual breakthrough.

In November 1931, Griffiths went to stay at the Benedictine monastery of Prinknash Abbey where he was impressed by the life. Despite the strong anti-Roman Catholic sentiments of his mother, he was received into the Roman Catholic Church and made his First Communion at Christmas Eve Mass at the abbey.

=== Benedictine monastic life ===
Griffiths was received by the abbey as a postulant a month after his reception into the Roman Catholic Church. On 29 December 1932, he entered the novitiate and was given the monastic name of "Bede". He made his solemn profession in 1937 (a year before the death of his mother in a car accident) and was ordained to the Catholic priesthood in 1940.

In 1947 the abbey sent a group of 25 monks to give support to two monasteries in the United Kingdom which had been founded by monks from France. Griffiths was chosen to be the obedientiary prior for the monastery at Farnborough in Hampshire. He led that house for four years, but was unable to generate sufficient financial support to keep the community going. The abbot then sent him to the other monastery, Pluscarden Abbey, in Scotland. It was there that he wrote his autobiography.

During Griffiths' time at Farnborough, he had come to know Father Benedict Alapatt, a European-born monk of Indian descent who was greatly interested in establishing a monastery in his homeland. Griffiths had already been introduced to Eastern thought, yoga and the Vedas and took interest in this proposed project. The abbot at first refused permission, but later changed his mind and authorised Griffiths to go to India with the Indian member of the community. There was one condition, though: Griffiths was not to be there as a member of the abbey, but as a priest subject to a local bishop, which meant that he would be giving up his vows.

=== Christian missionary ===
After some painful inner debate, Griffiths agreed to this and, in 1955, he embarked for India with Alapatt. At the time, he wrote to a friend: "I am going to discover the other half of my soul." After arriving and visiting some spiritual centres in the country, they settled in Kengeri in Bangalore with the goal of building a monastery there. That project was eventually unsuccessful as Griffiths left the location in 1958, saying that he found it "too Western".

Griffiths then joined with a Belgian monk, Father Francis Acharya, OCSO, to establish Kristiya Sanyasa Samaj, Kurisumala Ashram ("Mountain of the Cross"), a Syriac Rite monastery of the Syro-Malankara Catholic Church in Kerala. They sought to develop a form of monastic life based in the Indian tradition, adopting the saffron garments of an Indian sannyasi (an ascetic or monk). At that point, Griffiths took the Sanskrit name "Dayananda" ("bliss of compassion"). During that time he continued his studies in the religions and cultures of India, writing Christ in India while there. He also visited the United States during the period, giving a number of talks about East–West dialogue and being interviewed by CBS television.

Later, in 1968, Griffiths moved to the Saccidananda Ashram (also known as Shantivanam; Tamil for "forest of peace") in Tamil Nadu, South India, which had been founded in 1950 by the French Benedictine monk Abhishiktananda (Dom Henri Le Saux, OSB), from the Abbey of Kergonan, along with another Frenchman, the Abbé Jules Monchanin. The two had developed a religious lifestyle which was completely expressed in authentic Indian fashion, using English, Sanskrit and Tamil in their religious services. They had built the ashram buildings by hand in the style of the poor of the country. Monchanin had died in 1957 and Le Saux wanted to devote himself to a hermit's life. Griffiths came with two other monks to assume life there and to allow Le Saux his wish.

Griffiths resumed his studies of Indian thought, trying to relate it to Christian theology. At this point, he became known as "Swami Dayananda" ("bliss of compassion"). He wrote 12 books on Hindu–Christian dialogue. During this period, Griffiths desired to reconnect himself with the Benedictine order and sought a monastic congregation which would accept him in the way of life he had developed over the decades. He was welcomed by the Camaldolese monks, and he and the ashram became a part of their congregation.

Griffiths was a strict vegetarian who followed a sattvic diet of fruit, vegetables and dairy products.

=== Final years ===
In January 1990, Griffiths suffered a stroke in his room at the ashram. A month later, to the day, he was declared healed. The following year, he began a period of extensive travel, making annual visits to the United States, then later to Europe, where he met the Dalai Lama. He noted to a friend, "I do believe that he liked me." He continued his journey, giving lectures in Germany and England. He arrived back at the ashram in October 1992, where an Australian film crew were awaiting him to make a documentary about his life, which was released as A Human Search.

Three days after the completion of filming, on his 86th birthday, Griffiths had a major stroke. The following month, he had a further series of strokes. He died at Shantivanam on 13 May 1993, aged 86.

== Legacy ==
The archives of the Bede Griffiths Trust are located at the Graduate Theological Union in Berkeley, California. His contributions are promoted and developed by the Bede Griffiths Trust and by the Camaldolese Institute for East–West Dialogue based at the American Camaldolese hermitage of New Camaldoli, located in Big Sur, California.

== Bibliography ==
- The Golden String: An Autobiography, (1954), Templegate Publishers, 1980 edition: ISBN 0-87243-163-0, Medio Media, 2003: ISBN 0-9725627-3-7
- Christ in India: Essays Towards a Hindu-Christian Dialogue (1967), Templegate Publishers, 1984, ISBN 0-87243-134-7
- Return to the Center, (1976), Templegate Publishers, 1982, ISBN 0-87243-112-6
- The Marriage of East and West: A Sequel to The Golden String, Templegate Publishers, 1982, ISBN 0-87243-105-3
- Cosmic Revelation: The Hindu Way to God, Templegate Publishers, 1983, ISBN 0-87243-119-3
- A New Vision of Reality: Western Science, Eastern Mysticism and Christian Faith, Templegate Publishers, 1990, ISBN 0-87243-180-0
- River of Compassion: A Christian Commentary on the Bhagavad Gita, (1987), Element Books, 1995 reprint: ISBN 0-8264-0769-2
- Bede Griffiths, Templegate Publishers, 1993, ISBN 0-87243-199-1
- The New Creation in Christ: Christian Meditation and Community, Templegate Publishers, 1994, ISBN 0-87243-209-2
- (co-editor with Roland R. Ropers), Psalms for Christian Prayer, Harpercollins, 1996, ISBN 0-00-627956-2
- John Swindells (editor), A Human Search: Bede Griffiths Reflects on His Life: An Oral History, Triumph Books, 1997, ISBN 0-89243-935-1 (from 1992 Australian television documentary)
- Bruno Barnhart, O.S.B. Cam. (editor), The One Light: Bede Griffiths' Principal Writings, Templegate Publishers, 2001, ISBN 0-87243-254-8
- Thomas Matus, O.S.B. Cam. (editor), Bede Griffiths: Essential Writings, Orbis Books, 2004, ISBN 1-57075-200-1
- "The Relation of Ultimate Truth to the Life of the World." Arunodayam (Sep. 1962) 7–9; (Nov. 1962) 5–8.
- "God and the Life of the World: A Christian View." Religion and Society 9/3 (Sep. 1962) 50–58.
- India and the Sacrament. Ernakulam: Lumen Institute, 1964.
- Christian Ashram: Essays towards a Hindu-Christian Dialogue. London: DLT, 1966. 249 pp.
