= Catherine Forrester Paton =

British philanthropist and temperance campaigner

- Born: 1 June 1855; Alloa
- Died: 8 August 1914 (aged 59); Grantown-on-Spey

Catherine Forrester Paton (1 June 1855 – 8 August 1914) was a British philanthropist, temperance campaigner and the founder of women's missionary training in Scotland.

== Life ==
Paton was born in Alloa. Her parents were Alexander and Mary Forrester, but the family changed their name to Forrester Paton. Her mother's birth name was Paton and her father John Paton employed Alexander as an accountant at his large woollen business John Paton & Son. She was brought up in a religious household and she had the ambition to be a missionary but her health was considered poor. Aged fifteen she returned home from education to the family home which she inherited in 1883. In 1880 she took a leading role in the YWCA and she would host tea on Sundays for the young women.

She inherited a fortune from her parents and that enable her to concentrate on her interest in temperance. In 1876 she joined the British Women's Temperance Association and served as the secretary of the newly formed branch in Alloa.

In 1906 she was elected as the President of the temperance organisation BWTA Scottish Christian Union. She stressed in her acceptance speech that she was driven entirely by her Christian faith.

She allowed her home in Glasgow to be used as a training location for women who wanted to be missionaries. Women came from Britain and abroad and during her life 220 people were trained there.

Paton died in Grantown-on-Spey whilst suffering with pleurisy.

Her nephews included Ernest Forrester Paton and Colin Forrester-Paton.
