= John Melvin (Scottish architect) =

Scottish architect in central Scotland

John Melvin (1855–1905) was a Scottish architect in central Scotland specialising in Arts & Crafts architecture.

== Life ==
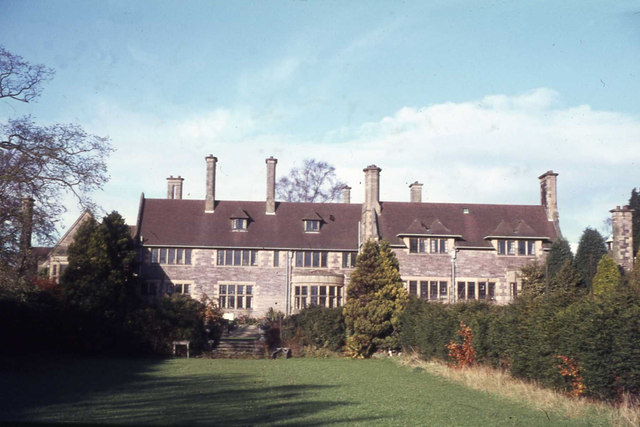
Gean House, Alloa

John Melvin was born in Alloa on 21 January 1855 the eldest son of John Melvin, architect (1805-1894)) who had joined the United Presbyterian Church of Scotland in the year of its creation in 1847. His mother was Helen McMillan.

He was articled to his father then moved to Edinburgh to broaden his experience working with George Beattie & Son under William Hamilton Beattie. Beatties were a new breed of "architect-builders". In 1874 he returned to Alloa to become a partner in John Melvin & Co.

== Death ==
He suffered from continual ill-health and died on 30 September 1905.

== Known works ==
- Natural History Museum, Alloa (1874)
- Norwood (villa in Alloa) (1874)
- Alloa Burgh School (1875)
- Dysart United Presbyterian Manse (1875)
- Clydesdale Bank, Bo'ness (1877)
- 63 Queen Street, Alloa (1878)
- Kilncraigs Factory and Mill (1878) for Patons Thread Co. (three further storeys added in 1902)
- Kirkton of Largo School, Upper Largo (1878)
- Tower on the Popular Institute in Tillicoultry (1878)
- Tillicoultry Town Hall (1879)
- Group of villas in Kellie Place, Alloa (1880)
- Alva Infant School (1885)
- Kincardine-on-Forth Public School (1889)
- Clackmannan County Infectious Disease Hospital, Sauchie (1893)
- Thistle Brewery, Alloa (1896)
- Infectious Disease Hospital, Linlithgow (1899)
- Infectious Disease Hospital, Bathgate (1901)
- Alloa Parish Church manse (a.k.a. Claremont House), 39 Claremont, Alloa (1901) later the home of the Earl of Mar and Kellie
- Alva Police Station (1901)
- Union Club, Alloa (1901) for Younger's Brewery
- Craig-na-Aird, 37 Claremont, Alloa (1902)
- Craigmyle, Alloa (1902)
- Hawkhill Cottages, Alloa (1902)
- St John's Episcopal School, Alloa (1902)
- Offices for John Paton & Sons, Alloa (1902)
- Corner tenement, Coalgate/Union Street, Alloa (1903)
- Liberal Club, Alloa (1904)
- Tillicoultry School (1904)
- Kellyside in Dollar (1905)

== John Melvin & Son ==
The practice continued after Melvin's death, being run by William Kerr. Notable further works include:

- Sauchie Public Hall (1911)
- Kinross High School (1911)
- The Gean, huge mansion near Alloa (1912) for Alexander Forrester Paton, childhood home of Colin Forrester-Paton.
- Linwood School (1912)
- YMCA Halls Alloa (1914)
- Minto Gardens housing scheme in Alva (1919)
- Extensions and adaption of boarding houses serving Dollar Academy (c.1922)
- Alloa Bowking Club (1925)
- Paton and Baldwin Sports Pavilion, Alloa (1926)
