= Jules Monchanin =

French Catholic priest, monk and hermit founder of Saccidananda Ashram

Monchanin

Father Jules Monchanin (who chose to call himself Swami Paramarubyananda) (April 10, 1895 in Fleurie, Rhône - October 10, 1957 in Paris) was a French Catholic priest, monk and hermit.

He is known for the being one of the "Trinity from Tannirpalli" along with Le Saux, and Griffiths who were the co-founders of Saccidananda Ashram (also called Shantivanam), an ashram founded in the village of Tannirpalli in Tamil Nadu. He was an ardent proponent of Hindu-Christian interfaith dialogue.

In 1939 Monchanin arrived in India from France and worked as a parish priest for 10 years in Trichy, Tamil Nadu. Henri le Saux arrived in Trichy in 1948 and two years later they established Saccidananda Ashram. Monchanin remained at the Ashram until serious illness caused him to return to France in September 1957; he died one month later.

== Partial works ==
- De l'esthétique à la Mystique (From aesthetics to the Mystic), 1955
- Ecrits spirituels (Spiritual Writings), 1965
- Lettres à sa mère, 1913 - 1957 (Letters to my mother, 1913 - 1957). Présentation F. Jacquin. Paris, Le Cerf, 1989.
- Mystique de l'Inde, mystère chrétien : écrits et inédits (Mystique of India, mystery Christian writings and unpublished), Paris: Fayard, 1974. Fata Morgana, 1999.
- Lettres au Père Le Saux (1947-1957) de J. Monchanin. (Letters to Father Le Saux (1947-1957)). Présentation F. Jacquin. Paris, Cerf, 1995.
- Théologie et spiritualité missionnaires (Theology and Spirituality missionaries) Présentation E. Duperray et J. Gadille. Paris, Beauchesne, 1985.
- Ermites du saccidânanda: Un essai d’intégration chrétienne de la tradition monastique de l’Inde. Paris, Casterman, 1956. 204 pp. [JC, NO]
- Swami Parama Arubianandam (Fr. Monchanin): A Memorial. Tiruchirapalli: Saccidananda Ashram, 1959. 224 pp.
- Swami Parama Arubianandam (Fr. Monchanin). French tr. of above. Paris: Casterman, 1960. 198 pp.
- Une amitié sacerdotale : Jules Monchanin-Edouard Duperray (1919-1990). Correspondance présentée par Françoise Jacquin. Lessius, 2003.

== Secondary sources ==
- Françoise, Jacquin. Jules Monchanin prêtre. Paris, Le Cerf, 1996.
- de Lubac, Henri. Images de l’Abbé Monchanin. Paris, Montaigne 1967.
- Vagneux, Yann. Co-esse. Le mystère trinitaire dans la pensée de Jules Monchanin (1895-1957). Paris: Desclée de Brouwer, 2015.
- Vagneux, Yann. Prêtre à Bénarés. Paris: Editions jésuites, 2018. (some mentions of Monchanin, cf. Index)
- Rodhe, Sten. Jules Monchanin: Pioneer in Hindu-Christian Dialogue. ISPCK 1993.
- Coward, Harold. Review of Sten Roche, Jules Monchanin: Pioneer in Hindu-Christian Dialogue. Hindu-Christian Studies Bulletin, Vol. 7, 1994.
