= Saccidananda Ashram =

Saccidananda Ashram (Tamil: சச்சிதானந்தா ஆசிரமம்; also called Shantivanam (சாந்திவனம்) is a Camaldolese Benedictine monastery in Tannirpalli, India founded in 1950.

== Description ==
Located in the village of Tannirpalli in the Karur District of Tamil Nadu, on the Kaveri River (10°55′39″N 78°26′27″E), Saccidananda Ashram was founded in 1950 by two French priests, Jules Monchanin, who later adopted the name Parma Arupi Anananda ("the supreme joy of the Spirit"), and Henri le Saux, who later adopted the name Abhishiktananda ("bliss of Christ"). Le Saux was also a Benedictine monk. The two wrote a book together about their ashram, entitled An Indian Benedictine Ashram (Monchanin & le Saux 1951), which was later re-published under the title A Benedictine Ashram. The goal of le Saux and Monchanin was to integrate Benedictine monasticism with traditional Indian ashram life, including renunciate life (sannyasa), saffron-colored (ochre) robes, and a vegetarian diet. In other words, "Vedantic philosophy, Christian theology, Indian lifestyle".

Trappist monk Francis Mahieu joined them in 1953, and later went on to found Kurisumala Ashram with Bede Griffiths in 1958. Griffiths himself stayed at Saccidananda Ashram in 1957 and 1958, returning from Kurisumala to the monastery in 1968 as its leader after Monchanin's death in 1957 and le Saux's increasing preference to live in the Himalayas as a hermit rather than remain at Saccidananda.

The monastery's name of Saccidananda refers to the Trinity of Christianity: God the Father, Son, and Holy Spirit. It is the literal translation of Trinity as "Being—Consciousness/Knowledge—Bliss" (Sat—Cit—Ananda) made in 1882 by Keshub Chandra Sen. The choice of this term for the monastery's name represented both Monchanin's interest in blending Christian and Hindu mysticism and his strong adherence to Christianity. It was not Monchanin's wish to identify Hinduism's concept of the Absolute (advaita) with the Trinity of Christianity, although he did believe reconciliation of the two mystical traditions could, with much effort, be made. As to the overall interest of the two men in integrating Vedanta with Christianity, however, le Saux was much more radical in his thinking than Monchanin, whose focus was on the transformation by Christianity of other religions. Le Saux's focus, however, was on the transformation of Christianity by non-Christian religions.

In addition to Saccidananda, the monastery also has another name: Shantivanam, or "place of peace." Shantivanam stands for something of unique value in the Church in India today. It stands for the contemplative mission of the Church, the mission to lead men to the contemplation of the Trinity, in which the ultimate mystery of the Godhead is revealed." Following the departure of Swami Abhishiktananda (Henri Le Saux) in 1968, the ashram was led by Father Bede Griffiths, an English Benedictine monk, until his passing in 1993. the ashram's leadership includes Fr. George, Bro. Martin, Fr.Dorathick Rajan has been serving as the Prior of Saccidananda Ashram (Shantivanam) since April 9, 2018. Under his leadership, the ashram continues its mission of integrating Christian monasticism with traditional Indian ashram life, fostering interreligious dialogue, and promoting contemplative practices.

== Sources ==
- Collins, Paul M. (2007). Christian inculturation in India. Liturgy, worship, and society. Ashgate Publishing, Ltd. ISBN 978-0-7546-6076-7.
- Cornille, Catherine (1992). The Guru in Indian Catholicism: Ambiguity Or Opportunity of Inculturation. Louvain Theological and Pastoral Monographs. Vol. 6. Wm. B. Eerdmans Publishing. ISBN 978-0-8028-0566-9.
- Coward, Harold G.; Goa, David J. (2004). Mantra: hearing the divine in India and America (2nd ed.). Columbia University Press. ISBN 978-0-231-12961-9.
- Du Boulay, Shirley (2005). The Cave of the Heart: The Life of Swami Abhishiktananda. Maryknoll, New York: Orbis Books. ISBN 978-1-57075-610-8.
- Griffiths, Bede (8 May 2021) [1st pub. The Tablet:1969]. "Shantivanam: The Forest of Peace". Bede Griffiths Sangha.
- Kim, Sebastian C. H. (2008). Christian theology in Asia. Cambridge University Press. ISBN 978-0-521-68183-4.
- Monchanin, Jules; le Saux, Henri (1951). An Indian Benedictine Ashram. Tiruchirapalli: Saccidananda Ashram.
- Oldmeadow, Harry (2004). "Jules Monchanin, Henri Le Saux/Abhishiktananda and the Hindu-Christian Encounter". Australian Religion Studies Review. 17 (2): 98–113.
- Robinson, Bob (2004). Christians meeting Hindus: an analysis and theological critique of the Hindu-Christian encounter in India. Regnum studies in mission. OCMS. ISBN 978-1-870345-39-2.
- Taft, Robert F. (1986). The liturgy of the hours in East and West: the origins of the divine office and its meaning for today (2nd ed.). Liturgical Press. ISBN 978-0-8146-1405-1.
- Teasdale, Wayne (2001). The Mystic Heart: Discovering a Universal Spirituality in the World's Religions (5th ed.). New World Library. ISBN 978-1-57731-140-9.
- Trapnell, Judson B. (2001). Bede Griffiths: a life in dialogue. SUNY series in religious studies. SUNY Press. ISBN 978-0-7914-4871-7.
