= Kurisumala Ashram =

Indian Catholic monastery (1958-)

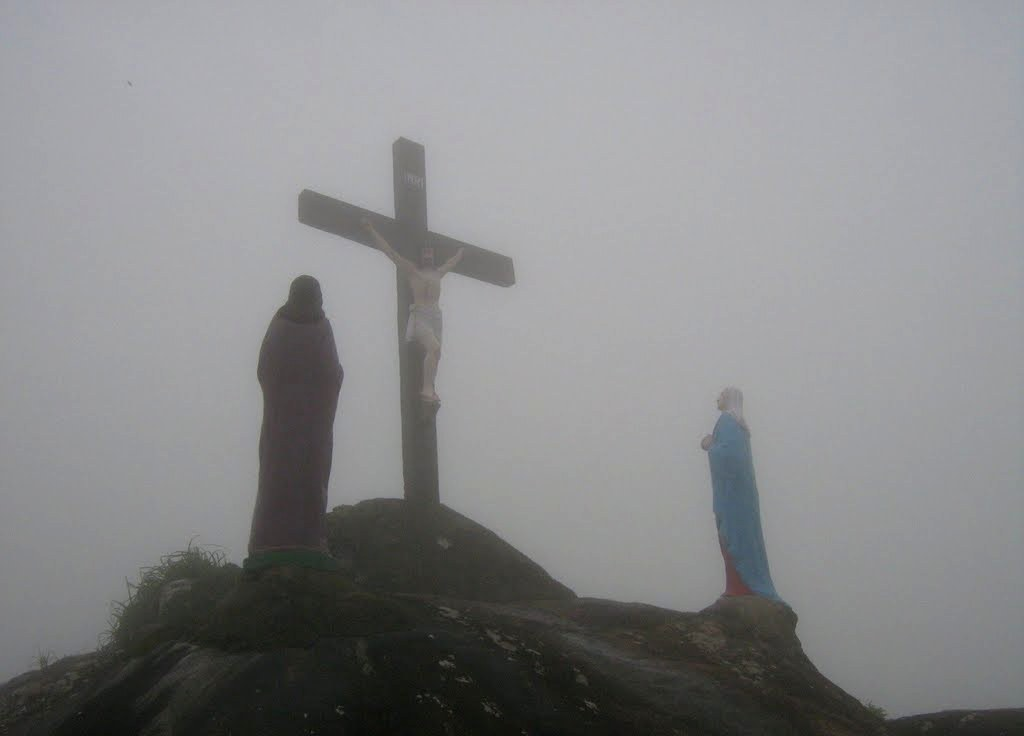
A Calvary tableau atop Kurisumala Hill, Vagamon

Kurisumala Ashram is a Trappist monastery of the Syro-Malankara Catholic Church, located in the Sahya Mountains of Vagamon, Kerala, India.

== History ==
In 1956, Zacharias Mar Athanasios, then a bishop of the Archeparchy of Tiruvalla, invited Francis Mahieu, a Trappist monk from Scourmont Abbey in Belgium, to Kerala to establish the ashram.

He was later joined by Bede Griffiths and on 1 December 1956, they laid the foundation at Tiruvalla in the Syro-Malankara Catholic Church. They acquired 88 acres (360,000 m^{2}) of land and, on 20 March 1958, traveled sixty miles to a mountain known as Kurisumala, officially establishing the monastery the next day. They soon started a dairy farm with cattle imported from Jersey to support themselves.

Within three years, the population of the monastery grew to fifteen monastics. Prayer services were initially held in Syriac.

Francis Mahieu later changed his name to Francis Acharya and became an naturalised Indian citizen. Some years before his death, Acharya, who had remained in touch with the monastery of his youth, had the Kurisumala Ashram affiliated with the Trappists. The monastery was incorporated as an abbey into the Cistercian Order of Strict Observance in July 1998. Yesudas Thelliyil became the ashram’s second abbot in March 2002.

Griffiths meanwhile spent the last years of his life at Shantivanam in Tamil Nadu. Acharya had meanwhile become the sole religious leader of Kurisumala.

== Name ==
Kurisu is the Malayalam translation of the word "cross," while mala means "mountain". Its description as an ashram denotes its origins as a monastery.

== Practice ==
In the monastery, the liturgical services follow the Syro-Malankara tradition and use the Indian Rite Mass. The Mass includes chants, ceremonies, and symbols adapted from Hindu tradition.

The ashram also emphasizes the importance of "bread-labour," where monks engage in farming and housework for several hours each day.

The monks have a nightly satsang, a time of reflection that may include readings from Christian or Hindu texts. Kurisumala is seen as a place for both Catholics and those who follow Gandhian philosophy.

The monastery has hosted Hindu guests and religious leaders.

The current abbott is Dom Sevanand Ennamprayil, who succeeded Ishananda Machiyanickal in 2018.

== Bibliography ==
- Francis Acharya: Cistercian Spirituality: An Ashram Perspective, Cistercian (Monastic wisdom series), 2011, 136pp.
