= Ernest Forrester Paton =

Scottish missionary

Ernest Forrester Paton (1891–1970), also known by the Tamil name Chinnannan, was a Scottish United Free Church medical missionary to Pune, part of then-Bombay Presidency. He was the co-founder of Christukula Ashram, the first Protestant Christian Ashram in India, along with S. Jesudasan, a fellow missionary and Tamilan convert to Christianity, at Tirupattur of North Arcot, Thamil Nadu—part of then-Madras Presidency in South India.

== Early life ==
Ernest Forrester Paton was born the son of Alexander Forrester Paton (1852-1915) and his wife Jean Paton. They were a religiously devout family at Alloa, Scotland; Catherine Forrester Paton, his aunt, founded a women's missionary training college in Glasgow. After primary schooling in Alloa, he continued his education at The Leys School, Cambridge, and at King's College, Cambridge. While at King's College, he became actively involved in the Student Christian movement and decided to become a missionary.

== Missionary work ==
In 1915, Ernest while a final year medical student in London appears to have got acquainted with Jesudasan, who was then-working in the London Medical Mission Hospital; it is also believed that it was Jesudasan who persuaded Ernest to go India for missionary work. Ernest Forrester and S. Jesudasan were sent as missionaries by the United Free Church (UFC) to Bombay Presidency's Pune, presently in Maharashtra.

At Pune, Ernest and Jesudasan appear to have disliked the missionary duties, especially the mission's attitude to the leadership of Indians; consequently, both left the UFC and went back to United Kingdom before they returned to India as missionaries to South India in 1920.

Ernest worked for fifty years as a missionary in South India. During that period, he changed his attire to Indian look by adopting an Indian way of living. All his life, he lived a simple life and contributed his earnings to the construction of hospitals, schools, and building up the ashram. Through his association with the newly founded Vellore Christian Medical College, both he and Jesudasan went to work amongst the villages and established Christu-Kula Ashram. They also built a chapel at Tirupattur between 1928 and 1932.

He joined Gandhi's Civil Disobedience campaign in 1930, and became a controversial figure in the eyes of the British Raj. On February 29, 1932, during the Civil Disobedience campaign, he was arrested on charges of picketing (under Ordinance V of 1932) and in fact, beaten by police during a Madras demonstration. This police case gained wider attention in India and Britain, including the raising of questions in the then-British Parliament. On 18 March February 1934, Gandhi came to Tiruppatur and visited S. Jesudan and Ernest Forrester.

He died at an age of seventy-nine on 2 May 1970 at Kotagiri, where he had been staying due to the hot climate at Tirupaatur during that time.

=== Christukula Ashram ===
With the growing national movement for Indian independence, liberal Western theologians, Indian Christian leaders associated with the Indian National Congress in East India Company provinces like Bengal and Madras Presidency, and notably, Scottish missionaries at Madras Christian College encouraged Indian Christian converts to rethink Christianity from an Indian perspective and clean it with Indian Christian literature. It also included like wearing the clothes of Indian Sannyasin as adopted by Robert de Nobili, and expressed their angst over the missionary emphasis on institutions like "Church". The Re-thinking group at Madras Christian College reiterated that Christianity must understand the spiritual genius of India, and adopt local methods of work and forms of worship; consequently, spirituality through Bhakti tradition (loving surrender to God) took its shape, and Inculturation of Christian faith through the notion of avatar became the order of the day. However, the attempts of the Re-thinking group attracted only a particular section of the Christian community—non-denominational missionary organizations started by converts in both Bengal and Madras Presidency failed to compete with well-established Western churches with adequate local resources attached to it. During this time, nationalist leaders like Gandhi and Rajaji gave an open call to the Indian christians to reform the institutional churches for allegedly having "impurities." [sic]—national leaders, especially Indian National Congress leaders or prominent Christian leaders associated with Indian National Congress, including liberal protestant theologians criticised the institution of the church for having hierarchy, rituals, and fixed dogmas – they publicly denounced that Church was more interested in administration than the Christian life—It is also believed without exaggeration that the nexus between the promoters of Indian Christian Ashram Movements and the Indian National Congress party facilitated the adoption of a secular Constitution of India, drafted similar to that of the Queen Victoria's proclamation.

During this period, certain initiatives were made to localize Christianity using another fusion model called the Ashram strategy. Although an ashram, a small community of faithful people living the life of simplicity and as disciples of guru for Christians, had been existing from long before, the idea of establishing the ashram as counter-institution to the Western church became a reality after Gandhi made a speech on the concept of ashram in a conference at Madras Christian College in 1915. Gandhi also supported the Christian Ashram at Sattal, Uttarakhand founded in 1930 by E. Stanley Jones, Methodist Christian missionary to India; and friend of Gandhi who wrote biography on Gandhi, Ethel Mary Turner and Younus Singh Sinha. Ashram strategy has spread all across India rapidly as Gandhi was a prominent Indian national leader, especially with wider state support and public sympathy after Gandhi assassination—Ashram is also an institution like Church with hierarchy and local resources attached to it – often, either ashram or church performs same administration and receives grants or lands from state.

With consultations from then-prominent Indian leaders like Gandhi and Rajaji, Ernest and Jesudasan established the Christukula Ashram (also Christu-Kula Ashram), family of Christ Ashram, in 1921 at Tirupattur in North Arcot, Tamil Nadu—South India. This ashram is considered as the first Protestant ashram to be founded in India to promote equality between Europeans and Indians, and also to present Christian life and worship to Indians—this ashram was aimed largely in aligning Christian community with the presumed ancient Hindu idea of the ashram. Gandhi was invited to this ashram and he looks to have appreciated its remarkable endorsement of another religious ethos.

The Christukula Ashram introduced new strategies like re-thinking everything in the light of theology through mysticism to suit the Indian context. As a pursuit of achieving communion, mysticism was identified with "conscious awareness of ultimate reality, the divinity, the spiritual truth, or God through direct experience, intuition, or insight." [sic] In the same context, Indian Christian theologians believed Bhakti mysticism as a bridge of understanding between Hinduism and Christianity as they felt that Bhakti mysticism was the nearest to Christian mystical experience.

== Works ==
- Ashram Past and Present.
- Devotional Addresses.
- The Christukula Ashram: Family of Christ Ashram at Tirupattur, 1940.

== See also ==
- Christian Ashram Movement
