= E. Stanley Jones =

Methodist missionary and theologian (1884–1973)

Eli Stanley Jones (1884–1973) was an American Methodist Christian missionary, theologian, and author. He is remembered for his interreligious lectures to the educated classes in India. His seminal work, The Christ of the Indian Road (ISBN 0-687-06377-9), sold more than a million copies worldwide after its publication in 1925. As of 2018, three million copies of his books have been sold. He is a founder in the Christian ashram movement. In 1938, Time called Jones "the world's greatest Christian missionary.".

== Life ==
E. Stanley Jones was born in Baltimore, Maryland on January 3, 1884. He was educated in Baltimore schools and studied law at City College before graduating from Asbury College, Wilmore, Kentucky in 1907. He was on the faculty of Asbury College when he was called to missionary service in India in 1907 under the Board of Missions of the Methodist Episcopal Church. He traveled to India and began working with the lowest castes, including Dalits. He became a close friend of many leaders in the Indian Independence movement and became known for his interfaith work. He said, “Peace is a by-product of conditions out of which peace naturally comes. If reconciliation is God’s chief business, it is ours - between man and God, between man and himself, and between man and man.”.

In 1911, he married fellow missionary Mabel Lossing, whom he met in India. Their only child, Eunice, was born in 1914.

According to his and other contemporary reports, his friendship for the cause of Indian self-determination allowed him to become a friend of leaders of the up-and-coming Indian National Congress party. He spent much time with Mohandas K. Gandhi and the Nehru family. Gandhi challenged Jones and, through Jones' writing, the thousands of Western missionaries working there during the last decades of the British Raj, to include greater respect for the mindset and strengths of the Indian character in their work.

In 1925, while home on furlough, he wrote a report of his years of service - what he had taught and what he had learned in India. It was published in a book released in 1926 titled "The Christ of the Indian Road" and became a best seller. It sold over a million copies. Other books followed and certain books or single chapters became required reading in various theological seminaries or in degree courses at government colleges in parts of the world.

His work became interdenominational and worldwide. He helped to re-establish the Indian “Ashram” (or forest retreat) as a means of drawing men and women together for days at a time to study in depth their own spiritual natures and quest, and what the different faiths offered individuals. In 1930, along with a British missionary and Indian pastor and using the sound Christian missionary principle of indigenization. (God's reconciliation to mankind through Jesus on the cross. He made Him visible as the Universal Son of Man who had come for all people. This opening up of nations to receiving Christ within their own framework marked a new approach in missions called "indigenization"). Jones reconstituted the “Ashram” with Christian disciplines. This institution became known as the ”Christian Ashram.”

In the months prior to December 7, 1941, he was a confidant of Franklin D. Roosevelt and Japanese leaders trying to avert war. Stranded in the United States during World War II with his family in India (because the only overseas travel allowed was for the military), he transplanted the Christian Ashram in the United States and Canada, where it has become a strong spiritual growth ministry. During this time, Jones spent six months in North America, conducting citywide evangelistic missions, Christian Ashrams, and other spiritual life missions and the other six months overseas. He preached and held Christian Ashrams in almost every country of the world.

In 1947 in the United States, he launched the Crusade for a Federal Union of Churches. He conducted mass meetings from coast to coast and spoke in almost five hundred cities, towns and churches. He advocated a system through which denominations could unite as they were, each preserving its own distinctive emphasis and heritage, but accepting one another and working together in a kind of federal union patterned after the United States' system of federal union.

In 1950 Jones provided funds for India's first Christian psychiatric center and clinic, the now noted Nur Manzil Psychiatric Center and Medical Unit at Lucknow. The staff includes specialists from India, Asia, Africa, Europe, and America who had given up lucrative practices to serve in this Christian institution which serves thousands of patients.

In 1959 Jones was named “Missionary Extraordinary” by the Methodist missionary publication World Outlook.

In 1962, he was nominated for the Nobel Peace Prize for his missionary work in India.

In 1963, Jones received the Gandhi Peace Award. Jones had become a close friend of Mahatma Gandhi, and after Gandhi's assassination wrote a biography of his life. It is noted that later in time, Rev. Dr. Martin Luther King Jr. told Jones' daughter, Eunice Jones Mathews, that it was this biography that inspired him to "non-violence" in the Civil Rights Movement.

In December 1971, at the age of 88, while leading the Oklahoma Christian Ashram, Jones suffered a stroke that seriously impaired him physically, including his speech. In spite of that, he dictated onto a tape recorder his last book "The Divine Yes" and preached from his wheelchair at the First Christian Ashram World Congress in Jerusalem in June 1972.

He died January 25, 1973, in India. He was survived by Mabel, who died five years later.

== Published works ==
These are the British publishers' titles; American titles may be different.

Some of his books, such as Victorious Living and Abundant Living, were designed to be read either from beginning to end as a novel or as a "page-a-day" daily devotional.

In 2009 Lucknow Publishing published Living Upon The Way, a 15-hour audio series of selected sermons.

In March and July 2010 Summerside Press published Victorious Living and Abundant Living in a new "ESJ Devotional Series" edited and expanded by Dean Merrill.

=== Books ===
- The Christ of the Indian Road (1925). German transl. Der Christus der indischen Landstraße. Jesu Nachfolge in Indien by Paul Gäbler (1928).
- Christ at the Round Table (1928). German tr. Christus am Runden Tisch. Offene Aussprachen unter Jesu Augen in Indien by Paul Gäbler (1930).
- The Christ of Every Road - A study in Pentecost (1930). German tr. by H[einrich] Fellmann (1931)
- The Christ of the Mount - A Working Philosophy of Life (1931). German transl. by H[einrich] Fellmann (1933)
- Christ and Human Suffering - Hodder & Stoughton, First English Edition, August 1933.
- Christ’s Alternative to Communism (1935) US title
- Christ and Communism (1935) UK title
- Victorious Living (1936) (devotional)
- The Choice Before Us (1937)
- Christ and Present World Issues (1937)
- Along the Indian Road (1939)
- Is the Kingdom of God Realism? (1940)
- Abundant Living (1942) (devotional)
- How to Pray (1943)
- The Christ of the American Road (1944)
- The Way (1946) (devotional)
- Mahatma Gandhi: An Interpretation (1948); 2nd ed.: Gandhi - Portrayal of a Friend (Abingdon, 1993)
- The Way to Power and Poise (1949) (devotional)
- How to be a Transformed Person (1951) (devotional)
- Growing Spiritually (1953) (devotional)
- Mastery (1953) (devotional)
- Christian Maturity (1957) (devotional)
- Conversion (1959)
- In Christ (1961) (devotional)
- The Word Became Flesh (1963) (devotional)
- Victory Through Surrender (1966)
- Song of Ascents (1968) (autobiography)
- The Reconstruction of the Church - On what Pattern? (1970)
- The Unshakable Kingdom and the Unchanging Person (1972)
- The Divine Yes (1975) (posthumously)

=== Compilations ===
- Sayings of E Stanley Jones - A Treasury of Wisdom and Wit (1994) Compiled and edited by Whitney J Dough
- Selections from E Stanley Jones - Christ and Human Need Compiled by Eunice Jones Mathews and James K Mathews
