= Francis Acharya =

Belgian-born Indian monk

Servant of God Francis Acharya O.C.S.O.

Monk
- Born: Jean-Richard Mahieu; 17 January 1912; Ypres, Belgium
- Died: 31 January 2002 (aged 90); Thiruvalla, Pathanamthitta, India
- Venerated in: Roman Catholic Church; Syro-Malankara Catholic Church

Francis Acharya (born Jean Richard Mahieu; 17 January 1912 – 31 January 2002) was a Belgian-born Indian Cistercian monk. In 1998, he founded the Syro-Malankara rite Kristiya Sanyasa Samaj, Kurisumala Ashram in Kerala, India. He was later affiliated to the Trappist Order.

== Early life ==
Jean Richard Mahieu was born on 17 January 1912 in Ypres, Belgium to a farming family. He was the fifth son of the seven children of René Mahieu and Anée Vandelanotte.

== Foundation of Kurisumala Ashram ==
Francis Mahieu later changed his name to Francis Acharya and on 6 August 1968, he took Indian citizenship. Later the same month Griffiths, after ten years in Kurisumala Ashram, left for Shantivanam with two brothers, Anugrah and Ajit, to take over that ashram from Swami Abhishiktananda.

== Writings ==
Acharya traveled to Iraq and procured original Syriac prayers of the Antiochean rite (the Penqito). Over nearly two decades, he translated selected portions into four volumes totaling 2300 pages, named Prayer with the Harp of the Spirit, with certain adaptations to Indian culture. (Harp of the Spirit was the name given to Saint Ephraim).

Published books include;

- Cistercian Spirituality
- Memorable Words of Life for Everyone trying to lead the Good Life

== Final days ==
Acharya died at Tiruvalla on the morning of 31 January 2002, after receiving Holy Communion. His body was kept until 4 February at Pushpagiri Medical College, Thiruvalla.

He is currently a candidate for beatification.

== Bibliography ==
- Marthe Mahieu-De Praetere: Francis Mahieu Acharya, un pionnier du monachisme chrétien en Inde, Abbaye de Scourmont (cahiers scourmontois N°3), 2001, 384pp.
