= Tannirpalli =

Village in Tamil Nadu, India

Thanneerpalli, also known as Thanneerppalli, (10°55′33″N 78°26′14″E) is a large village in Karur District, Tamil Nadu, India. It lies on the road to Tiruchirapalli and about 1.5 miles from Kulittalai. According to the 1981 census it had a population of 7,429 people. It lies on the bank of the Kavery river and lies in an arid area with mangroves. Thanneerpalli has a notable fine temple and is known for the "Trinity from Thanneerpalli" (Monchanin, Le Saux, and Griffiths), who were the co-founders of Saccidananda Ashram (also called Shantivanam), an ashram founded in the village in 1938.

The cutting and processing of synthetic gems is important in the local economy, employing many women.
