= Abhishiktananda =

French-Indian monk

Swami Abhishiktananda
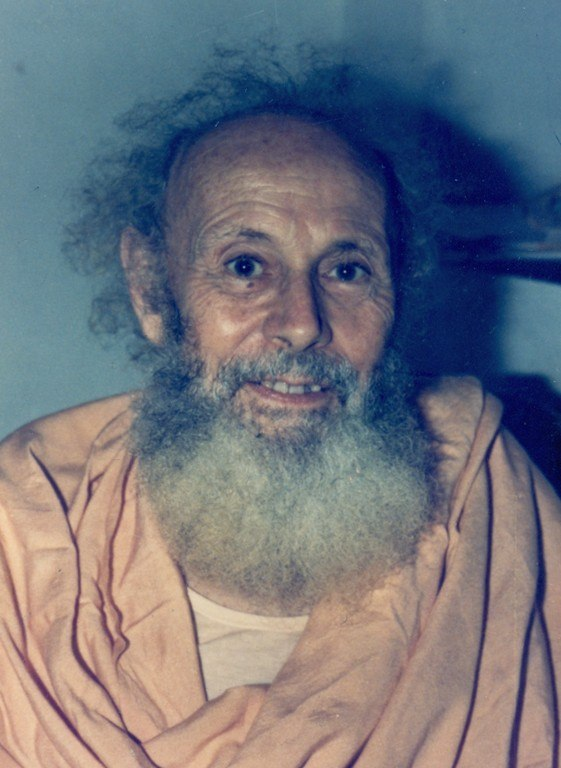
- Title: Monk, Sannyasi

Personal life
- Born: Henri Le Saux; 30 August 1910 Saint Briac, Brittany, France
- Died: 7 December 1973 (aged 63) Indore, Madhya Pradesh, India

Religious life
- Religion: Christianity; Hinduism

Senior posting
- Teacher: Sri Gnânânanda Giri
- Disciples: Swami Ajatananda Saraswati, Sr. Thérèse (Lemoine), Ramesh Shrivastava, Lalit Sharma, Ajit Muricken.

Quotation

If at all I had to give a message, it would be the message of "Wake up, arise, remain aware" of the Katha Upanishad. The coloration might vary according to the audience, but the essential goes beyond. The discovery of Christ's I AM is the ruin of any Christian theology, for all notions are burnt within the fire of experience.

Swami Abhishiktananda (Sanskrit: स्वामी अभिषिक्तानन्द, romanized: Svāmī Abhiṣiktānanda; 30 August 1910, in Saint Briac, Brittany–7 December 1973, in Indore, Madhya Pradesh, India), born Henri Le Saux, was a French-born Indian monk. He moved to India in 1948 in search of a more radical form of spiritual life, adopted sannyasa in accordance with Indian tradition, and became one of the pioneers of Hindu-Christian dialogue. Multiple contacts with prominent saints such as Sri Ramana Maharshi, Sri Gnanananda Giri, and Sri H.W.L. Poonja led him to profound advaitic experience as well as to final recognition of the truth of advaita during the last years of his life.

== Biography ==
=== Early years and Benedictine monastic life (1910–1948) ===
Le Saux was born on 30 August 1910 in St Briac, a small town on the north coast of Brittany. He was the first child of Alfred Le Saux and Louise Sonnerfaud, who gave him the names Henri Briac Marie. In 1921 his parents sent him to the minor seminary at Châteaugiron, from which in 1925 he went to the major seminary at Rennes. From his boyhood he had felt a monastic vocation: "What has drawn me from the beginning and what still leads me on is the hope of finding there the presence of God more immediately than anywhere else ..." At the age of 19 he was admitted as a postulant to the Benedictine monastery at Sainte-Anne de Kergonan where he spent another nineteen years (with a short break between the years 1939 and 1941 when he was required to participate in World War II as a sergeant of the French Army).

The call to India was heard by Le Saux at Kergonan, as early as 1934, within five years of entering the monastery. It was closely related to his vocation to a more radical contemplative life that he lacked within the existing framework of western monasticism. He expressed this feeling in his characteristic phrase that became his motto: "Beyond, always beyond." In May 1947 he wrote to the Bishop of Tiruchirappalli, asking his help in "settling somewhere in the neighborhood of Tiruchi so that, living in some hermitage, he might there lead the contemplative life ... in the closest possible conformity with the traditions of Indian sannyasa." The letter was eventually replied to by a French priest, Jules Monchanin, who had left for India in 1939 at the age of 44. The latter did his best to help Le Saux in arranging his arrival in India. In his correspondence of 7 August 1947, Monchanin advised his future partner: "Learn as much English as you can. You will have no objection to a purely vegetarian diet (essential for the life of a sannyasi). You will need unshakable courage, complete detachment from the things of the West, and a profound love for India ..."

=== Sannyasa life (1948–1968) ===
Le Saux arrived in Colombo on 15 August 1948, and a few days later joined Jules Monchanin in Kulittalai (Tamil Nadu). In January 1949 the two seekers visited the ashram of one of the greatest sages of modern India, Sri Ramana Maharshi (1879 – 1950), at the foot of Arunachala mountain in Tiruvannamalai (Tamil Nadu). Le Saux's meeting with the sage had a profound effect on his life as he recounted it in his diary: "I consider this stay at Tiruvannamalai as a real retreat and at the same time as an initiation into Hindu monastic life. I want to ... enter into the great silence and peace which, as I have read and also been told, is to be found at the ashram ..." The darshana of Sri Ramana Maharshi became for him the first introduction into the wisdom of advaita: "In the contemporary Sage of Arunachala it was the unique Sage of eternal India that appeared to me... it was a call that pierced through everything, rent it in pieces, and opened a mighty abyss."

In 1950 Le Saux and Monchanin following their monastic vocation and emerging spiritual ideal, established the Saccidananda Ashram (Shantivanam) on the banks of the holy river Kaveri (Cauvery), with the aim of allowing monks of different traditions to live together in contemplation, sharing the "silent communion in the quest of the Unique". In accordance with Indian tradition they adopted new names for themselves: Le Saux became Abhishikteshvarananda ("Bliss of the Anointed Lord"), later shortened to Abhishiktananda, and Monchanin as Parama Arubi Ananda ("Bliss of the Supreme Formless One"). The daily routine in the ashram was based on the three sandhyavandanam-s (prayers at the meeting points of day and night and at midday), enriched with Sanskrit and Tamil texts and hymns. Much time was given to spiritual and indological study, although the two monks remained in silence for the greater part of the day.

From 1952, to 1955, Abhishiktananda made several visits to the sacred mountain of Arunachala, of which this account can be found in his book The Secret of Arunachala (published posthumously in 1975). During these visits he experienced lengthy stays in the mountain's caves, dedicating most of his time to contemplation. In 1953 he met a well known teacher of advaita, Sri H.W.L. Poonja (also known later as "Papaji"), who had a deep impact on his spiritual quest. In 1955 in Tirukoilur, his first meeting with the contemporary sage Swami Sri Gnanananda Giri took place: "I could not resist making the great prostration of our Hindu tradition, and to whom I believe I might give myself over completely ... I now know what India means by the term guru ...". Further on Sri Gnanananda became Swamiji's guru and his teachings are eloquently described in Swami Abhishiktananda's publication Guru and Disciple (1970). Sri Gnanananda's message was focused on the practice of dhyana (meditation):

Return within,
to the place where there is nothing,
and take care that nothing comes in.
Penetrate to the depths of yourself,
to the place where thought no longer exists,
and take care that no thought arises there!

There where nothing exists,
Fullness!
There where nothing is seen,
the Vision of Being!
There where nothing appears any longer,
the sudden appearing of the Self!

Dhyana is this!.

Abhishiktananda's deep devotion to the guru is clearly seen in his letters of that period: "Here for a fortnight with my Guru. I have been totally "caught" ... If that man were to ask me tomorrow to set out on the roads naked and silent like Sadasiva Brahmendra, I would be unable to refuse ... In him I have felt the truth of advaita ..."

Later in the 1960s, Abhishiktananda commenced regular pilgrimages to Northern India and in 1968 he left Shantivanam forever having passed it to Bede Griffiths OSB Cam (1906–1993) for the ongoing development of the ashram.

In 1950 Henri Le Saux visited Srirangam temple. Despite the temple barring non-Hindus from entry, he ventured into it. James Stuart, who accompanied him at the time noted that he diverted his eyes from the sign stating such, and continued into the temple premises. Once inside the temple he refused to take part in Hindu rituals, as he stated in a letter:

the priest took up a tray containing camphor(...), set it alight, recounted the glories of Sri Rangam Nathar [i.e., Vishnu], and began to offer a puja in my honour...I have never had such good treatment but, all the same it was nothing doing, for I should have had to make the anjali, prostrate spread my hands over the flame and bring them to my eyes, put the ashes on my forehead etc. ... I protested - horror indignation!

— Henri Le Saux

=== Final years and awakening (1968–1973) ===
In October 1968, Abhishiktananda settled in a small kutiya at Gyansu (a kilometre away from Uttarkashi), where he would spend six to eight months in solitude during the years 1969 to 1971. His main purpose was to lead a contemplative life, of which he wrote to a close friend, Odette Baumer-Despeigne: "... To be living here as a rule is going to be a new experience. I can scarcely hope to be that acosmic being of whom I wrote in Gangotri, but at least I might be able to be something of that sort ..." During this period he was also participating in a series of interreligious meetings, conferences and study sessions, including participation in the All-India Seminar in Bangalore (15 May–20 June 1969), etc.

However, one of the main events of his final years was the meeting with a young Frenchman who later became his one true and prominent disciple, Marc Chaduc. Their correspondence commenced in the late 1960s. In one of his first letters Abhishiktananda, replying to Marc's questions regarding the possibility of a permanent stay in India, states: "... The essential thing is to penetrate the interior mystery to which India bears witness so intensely.... Without a contemplative sense, to come to India is absolutely useless ..." Chaduc arrived in India on 29 September 1971 at the age of twenty-seven and met Abhishiktananda a few weeks later in Delhi on 21 October. The first ten days spent together in Delhi led to an unparalleled guru-disciple relationship between the two which brought about a revolutionary change in Abhishiktananda's life: "I have found in him (Chaduc) a truly total disciple. With him and two young Hindus I experience from the other end what the guru is. It is really the chela (disciple) who makes the guru, and you have to have lived it, in order to grasp this relationship "beyond words ..." Abhishiktananda subsequently sent Chaduc on a pilgrimage, including to Sri Ramana's Ashram and Arunachala, where Abhishiktananda had previously encountered a profound spiritual experience: "There is no question that Arunachala is a powerful magnet. How I should like to lead you round from cave to cave ..." During the last twenty months of his life Abhishiktananda's advaitic experience deepened and he realizes the truth of the Upanishads with utter clarity: "The mantra Om Tat Sat sings all day long ... That madhu (honey) which everything is to everything else, that constant take-off into the Beyond, the golden Purusha full of glory – you know it so well ..."

On 30 June 1973, Abhishiktananda, along with the then President of the Divine Life Society, Swami Chidananda Saraswati, arranged on the banks of the Ganga in Rishikesh, a very simple rite of sannyasa-diksha (initiation into sannyasa) for Chaduc, after which he became known as Swami Ajatananda Saraswati. Abhishiktananda was deeply moved by this experience which he considered to be the very culmination of his own life. He had a clearer vision of the fact that the truth is not conditioned by any concepts, myths or symbols and lies beyond them all: "We have to descend into the ultimate depths to recognize that there is no common denominator at the level of namarupa (name and form). So we should accept namarupa of the most varied kinds ... We should penetrate the depth of each other's mystery ... Take off from each of them as from a springboard, towards the bottomless ocean ..."

His posthumous book, The Further Shore, which he wrote several months before his mahasamadhi, reflects his last experiences and his disciple Swami Ajatananda draws attention in the book's foreword to the fact that "... nothing that Swamiji wrote had not been lived by him, realized in himself. This is the beauty of his written work, which was the fruit of his silence."

On 14 July 1973, Abhishiktananda was struck by a heart attack that he himself described as a "spiritual awakening". The remaining several months of his life were spent in a state of bliss and realization, expressed by himself in his writings: "O I have found the Grail ... The quest for the Grail is basically nothing else than the quest for the Self ... It is yourself that you are seeking through everything. And in this quest you are running about everywhere, whereas the Grail is here, close at hand, you only have to open your eyes ... There is only the Awakening."

In the evening of 7 December 1973 in Indore, Abhishiktananda underwent another brief heart attack and at about 11 pm he died. His last words were "God's will be done."

== Legacy ==
In order to foster the message and the writings of Abhishiktananda through the publication of his books and unpublished manuscripts, Raimon Panikkar, Patrick D'Souza, Jacques Dupuis, Sita Ram Goel, Ram Swarup, N. Shanta and James Stuart, founded the Abhishiktananda Society (Delhi) in 1978. The society was dissolved in 2008 after thirty years of contribution to Hindu-Christian dialogue and the publishing rights for his books in English and various Indian languages, were transferred to the Delhi Brotherhood Society (DBS). As a result, a new section named the Abhishiktananda Centre for Interreligious Dialogue, was formed to carry on the task of promoting Abhishiktananda's writings in India and abroad in English. This work is also being continued in the West by the Monastic Interreligious Dialogue (DIMMID), which holds the world rights in all languages with the exception of the English and Indian languages. This centre also stores the Abhishiktananda Archives, where handwritten or typed manuscripts written by Abhishiktananda date between approximately forty to sixty-three years of age. It is planned to digitally scan the archives and make them available under specific conditions for scholars and researchers in India and abroad.

== Selected bibliography ==
=== Primary ===
==== In English ====
- Prayer, Delhi (ISPCK), 1967; new and enlarged edition, 1989; reprinted, Philadelphia (Westminster Press), 1973; reprinted, London (Canterbury Press Norwich), 2006; Revised and enlarged edition: Prayer: Exploring Contemplative Prayer through Eastern and Western Spirituality, edit.by Swami Atmananda Udasin, foreword by Rev. Dr. James D.M. Stuart, Delhi (ISPCK), 2015.
- Saccidananda: A Christian Approach to Advaitic Experience, Delhi (ISPCK) 1974; revised and updated edition Saccidananda: Theological Perspectives on Advaita and the Trinity, edit. by Swami Atmananda Udasin, Delhi (Christian World Imprints), 2023.
- Guru and Disciple: an Encounter with Sri Gnanananda, a Contemporary Spiritual Master, London (SPCK), 1974; revised edition, Delhi (ISPCK), 1990; reprinted in 2000; new and enlarged edit. by Swami Atmananda Udasin, pref. by Swami Nityananda Giri, Chennai (Samata Books), 2012; reprinted by Abhishiktananda Centre for Interreligious Dialogue, Delhi, 2019.
- The Further Shore, Delhi (ISPCK), 1975; reprinted with addition of "The Upanishads and Advaitic Experience" and poems, 1984.
- The Secret of Arunachala, Delhi (ISPCK), 1979; reprinted 1988; revised edition, 1997.
- Ascent to the Depth of the Heart. The Spiritual Diary (1948-1973) of Swami Abhishiktananda, Delhi (ISPCK), 1998.
- In the Bosom of the Father: The Collected Poems of a Benedictine Mystic, translated by Jacob Riyeff, foreword by Cyprian Consiglio, afterword by Swami Atmananda Udasin, Eugene, OR (Wipf & Stock), 2018.
- In Search of Ultimate Understanding: Selected Essays in Hindu-Christian Spirituality, edit. by Swami Atmananda Udasin, introd. by Jacques Dupuis, Delhi (ISPCK), 2023 (translation from Intériorité et Révélation. Essais théologiques, Sisteron, 1982).
- The Gift of Friendship: Correspondence and Inner Journeys, Raimon Panikkar – Henri Le Saux (Abhishiktananda), edit. Milena Carrara, foreword by Javier Melloni, Delhi (ISPCK), 2024.

==== In French ====
- Gnânânanda. Un maître spirituel du pays tamoul, Chambéry (Présence), 1970.
- Eveil à soi – éveil à Dieu. Essai sur la prière, Paris (Centurion), 1971, Paris (OEIL), 1986.
- Initiation à la spiritualité des Upanishads. "Vers l'autre rive", Sisteron (Présence), 1979.
- Intériorité et révélation. Essais théologiques, Sisteron (Présence), 1982.
- La montée au fond du cœur. Le journal intime du moine chrétien – sannyasi hindou, introduction et notes de R. Panikkar, Paris (OEIL), 1986.
- Secrets de l’Inde, introduction et notes par Frère Antoine Desfarges, Le Bec-Hellouin (Les Ateliers du Bec), 2014. This title comprises two previously published works: Gnânânanda (Présence, 1970) and Souvenirs d’Arunachala (Epi,1978).
- Vers l'expérience intérieure. Lettres à sa soeur, Soeur Thérèse Le Saux (1952-1973), présentation et annotation par Armelle Dutruc, Perpignan (Artège-Lethielleux) 2018.
- Le Swami et la Carmélite, vol. 1: L'appel de l'Inde. Correspondance 1959-1968, 2022; vol. 2: La beauté du Gange. Correspondance 1968-1973, ed. Yann Vagneux, Orbey (Arfuyen), 2022-2023.

==== In Italian ====
- Diario spirituale di un monaco cristiano-samnyasin hindu (1948-1973), ed. Milena Carrara, Milano (Mondadori), 2002.
- Ricordi d'Arunachala. Racconto di un eremita cristiano in terra hindu, ed. Stefano Rossi, Padova (Ed. Messaggero), 2004.
- Alle sorgenti del Gange. Pellegrinaggio spirituale (Quaderni di Ricerca, 46), new edition by Milena Carrara and Espedito D'Agostini, Troina (Servitium), 2005.
- Gnanananda. Un maestro spirituale della terra Tamil. Raconti di Vanya, ed. Stefano Rossi, Troina (Servitium), 2009.
- Risveglio a sé, risveglio a Dio (Quaderni di Ricerca, 51), Troina (Servitium), 2011.
- L’altra riva, (Quaderni di Ricerca,119), Troina (Servitium), 2018.
- Nella Caverna del Cuore, ed. Stefano Rossi, Bagno a Ripoli (Le Lettere), 2022.

==== In German ====
- Der Weg zum anderen Ufer, Köln (E.Diederichs),1980.
- Die Gegenwart Gottes erfahren, Mainz (Matthias-Grünewald-Verlag), 1980.
- Das Geheimnis des heiligen Berges. Als christlicher Mönch unter den Weisen Indiens, Freiburg/Basel/Wien (Herder), 1989.
- Wege der Glückseligkeit: Begegnung indischer und christlicher Mystik, Kösel Verlag, München 1995.
- Innere Erfahrung und Offenbarung. Theologische Ausätze zur Begegnung von Hinduismus und Christentum. (Salzburger Theologische Studien, 23), ed. Bettina Bäumer, Christian Hackbarth-Johnson and Ulrich Winkler, Innsbruck/Vienna (Tyrolia-Verlag), 2005.
- Das Feuer der Weisheit, Bern/München/Wien (O.W. Barth Verlag), 1979; new edition, Grafing (Aquamarin Verlag), 2009.

==== In Spanish ====
- Gurú y discípulo. Un encuentro con Sri Gnanananda Giri, maestro espiritual contemporáneo. Pequeña Tierra 2017.
- Oración. Una mirada a la oración contemplativa en la espiritualidad oriental y occidental. Pequeña Tierra 2020.

==== In Tamil ====
- The Further Shore, transl. and edit. by Dr. Ananda Amaladass, Chennai (Vivarium Publications), 2002.
- Guru and Disciple: An Encounter with Sri Gnanananda, a Contemporary Spiritual Master, transl. and edit. by Swami Nityananda Giri, foreword by Swami Atmananda Udasin, Thapovanam (Sri Gnanananda Niketan), 2018.

==== In Russian ====
- Гуру и ученик, перевод Максима Демченко, введение Свами Атмананды Удасина, предисловие Свами Нитьянанды Гири, Москва (Ганга), 2013.

=== Secondary ===
==== In English ====
- Stuart, James, Swami Abhishiktananda: His Life Told through his Letters, Delhi (ISPCK), 1989, new edition in 1995, reprinted in 2000. Revised and updated edit. and foreword by Swami Atmananda Udasin, Rhinebeck (Monkfish Book Publishing), December 2024.
- Vandana Mataji (ed.), Swami Abhishiktananda: The Man and His Message, Delhi (ISPCK), 1993.
- Kalliath, Antony, The Word in the Cave: The Experiential Journey of Swami Abhishiktananda to the Point of Hindu-Christian Meeting, New Delhi (Intercultural Publications), 1996.
- Rogers, Murray and Barton, David, Abhishiktananda: A Memoir of Dom Henri Le Saux, Oxford (SLG Publications), 2003.
- Du Boulay, Shirley, The Cave of the Heart: The Life of Swami Abhishiktananda, Maryknoll (Orbis Books), 2005.
- Oldmeadow, Harry, A Christian Pilgrim in India: The Spiritual Journey of Swami Abhishiktananda (Henri Le Saux), Bloomington (World Wisdom), 2008.
- Skudlarek, William (ed.), God’s Harp String: The Life and Legacy of the Benedictine Monk Swami Abhishiktananda, Brooklyn (Lantern Books), 2010.
- Skudlarek, William and Bäumer, Bettina (eds.), Witness to the Fullness of Light: The Vision and Relevance of the Benedictine Monk Swami Abhishiktananda, Brooklyn (Lantern Books), 2011.
- John Glenn Friesen, Abhishiktananda (Henri Le Saux): Christian Nondualism and Hindu Advaita, Calgary (Aevum Books), 2015.

==== In French ====
- Davy, M-M., Henri Le Saux – Swami Abhishiktananda. Le passeur entre deux rives, Paris (Le Cerf), 1981 ; édition revue et augmentée, Paris (Albin Michel), 1997.
- Stuart, James, Le bénédictin et le grand éveil, Paris (Jean Maisonneuve), 1999.
- Du Boulay, Shirley, La grotte du cœur. La vie de Swami Abhishiktananda, Henri Le Saux, préface par Raimon Panikkar, Paris (Le Cerf), 2007.
- Oldmeadow, Harry, Henri Le Saux. Christianisme et spiritualité indienne, Paris (Almora), 2010.
- Euverte, M.-F., Gelineau, J.-G., Jacquin, F. et al., Henri Le Saux, moine de Kergonan, Saint-Maur (Parole et Silence), 2012.
- Mandala, Patrick, Plénitude de l’Etre. Vie et enseignement de Sri Gnanananda. Témoignage d’Henri Le Saux, préf. par Swami Atmananda Udasin, Paris (Accarias l’Originel), 2015.

==== In Italian ====
- Conio, Caterina, Abhishiktananda sulle frontiere dell'incontro cristiano-hindu, Assisi (Citadella), 1994.
- Trianni, Paolo, Henri Le Saux (Svami Abhishiktananda). Un incontro con l’India, Milano (Jaca Book), 2011.
- Trianni, Paolo and Skudlarek, William OSB. (ed.), Cristo e l’Advaita: La mistica di Henri Le Saux O.S.B. tra cristianesimo ed induismo, Roma (Edizioni Studium), 2013.

==== In German ====
- Hackbarth-Johnson, Christian, Interreligiöse Existenz: Spirituelle Erfahrung und Identität bei Henri Le Saux (O.S.B.)/Swami Abhishiktānanda (1910-1973), Berlin (Peter Lang GmbH / Europäische Hochschulschriften), 2003.
- Bettina Bäumer and Ulrich Winkler (eds.), Unterwegs zur Quelle des Seins: Die Relevanz des Lebens und Denkens von Henri Le Saux/Abhishiktananda für die hindu-christliche Begegnung, (Salzburger Theologische Studien, 55), ed., Innsbruck /Vienna (Tyrolia Verlag), 2016.

==== In Russian ====
- Демченко, Максим, Путь Сатчитананды, Москва (Ганга), 2008.
