= Boston =

Capital and largest city in Massachusetts, United States

- State capital
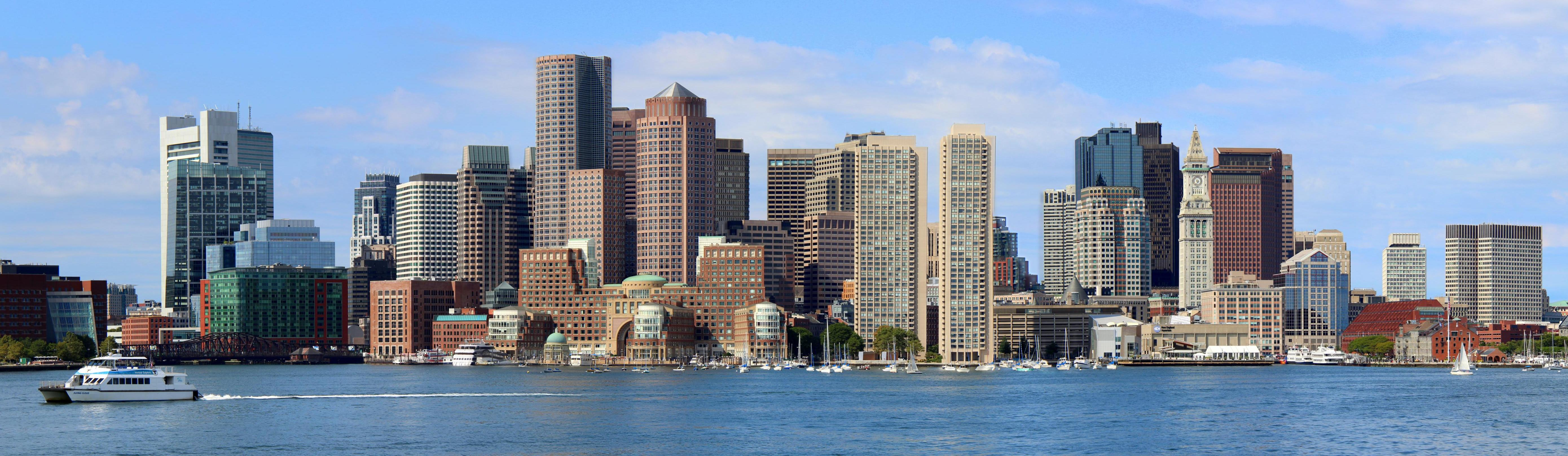
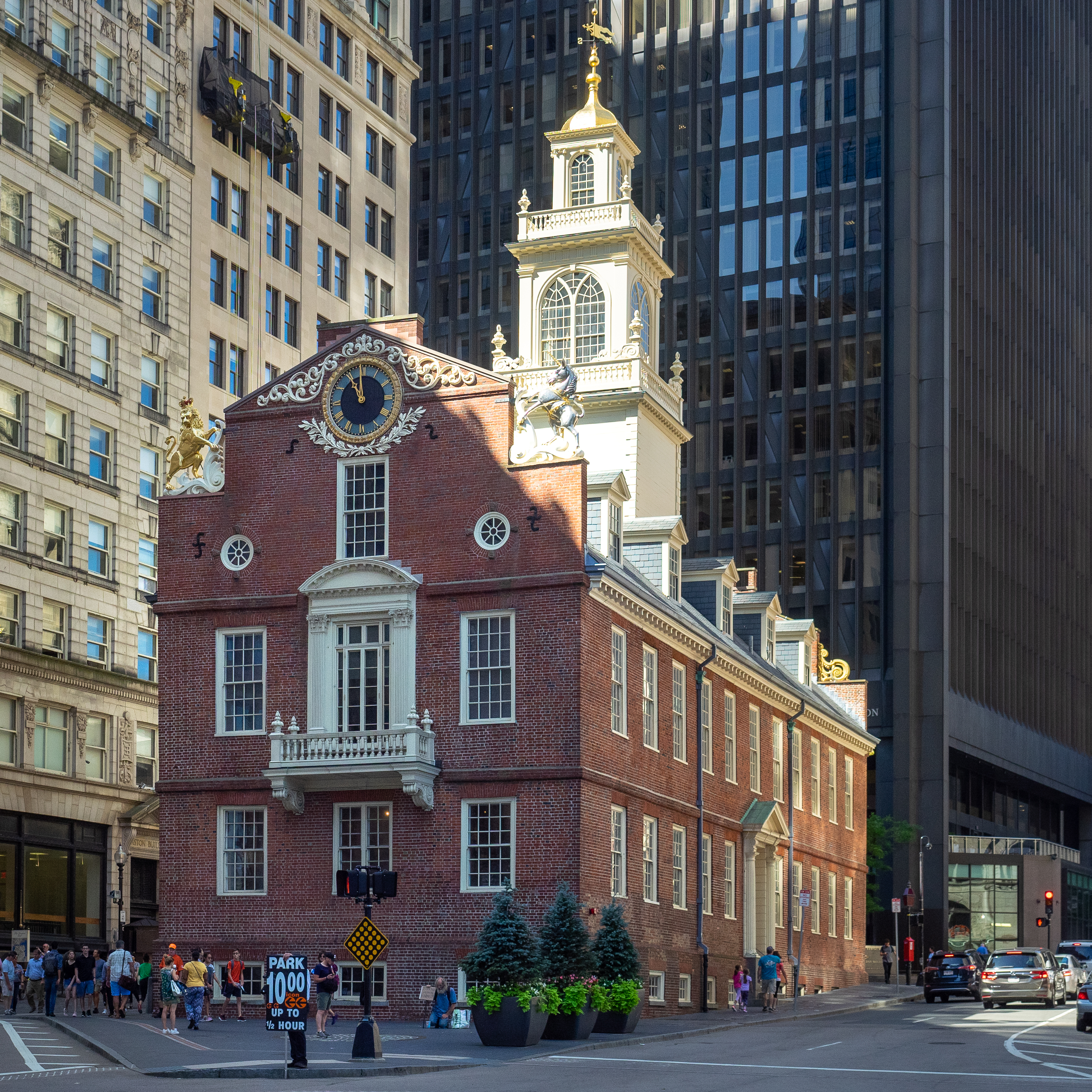
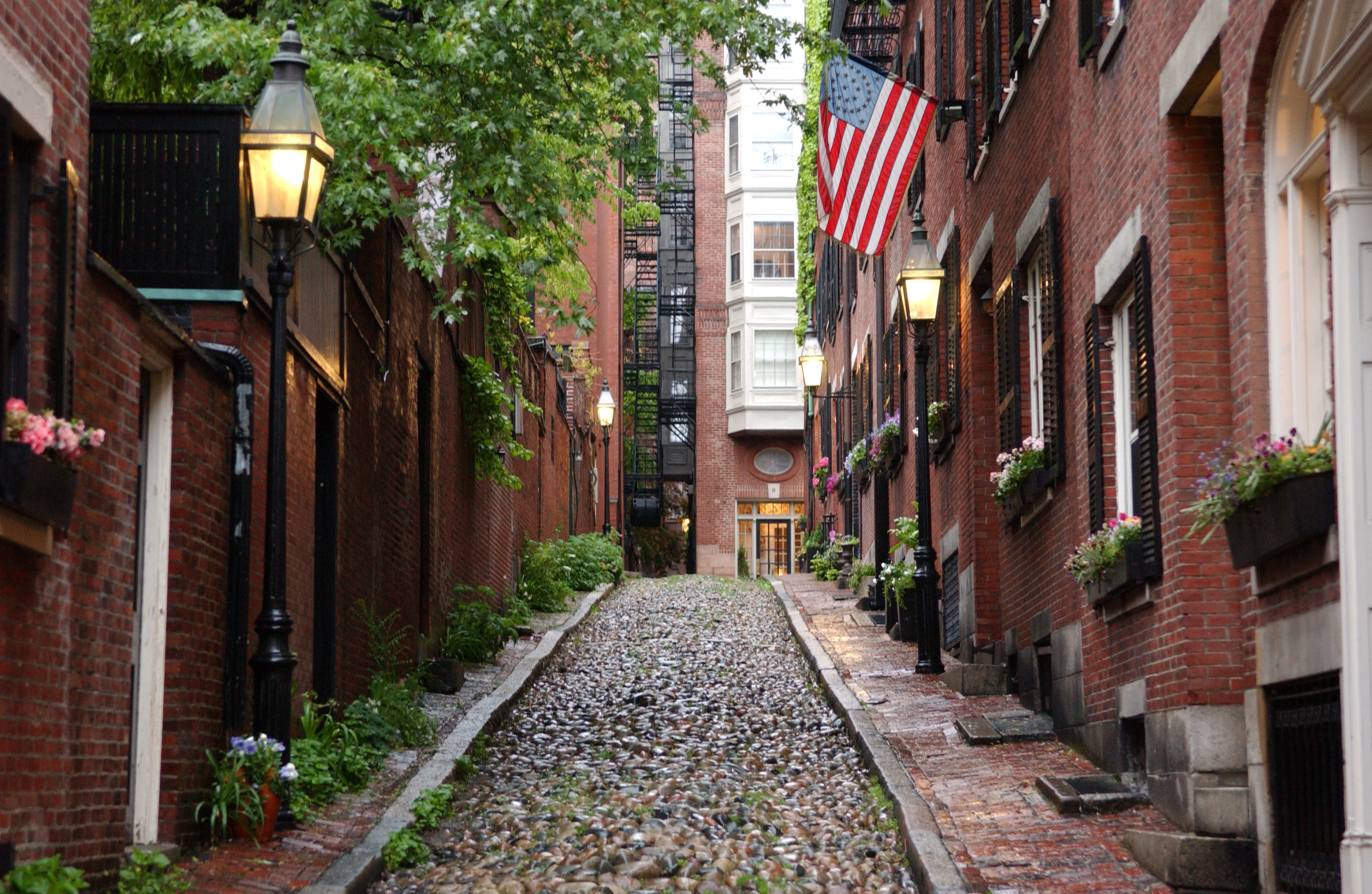
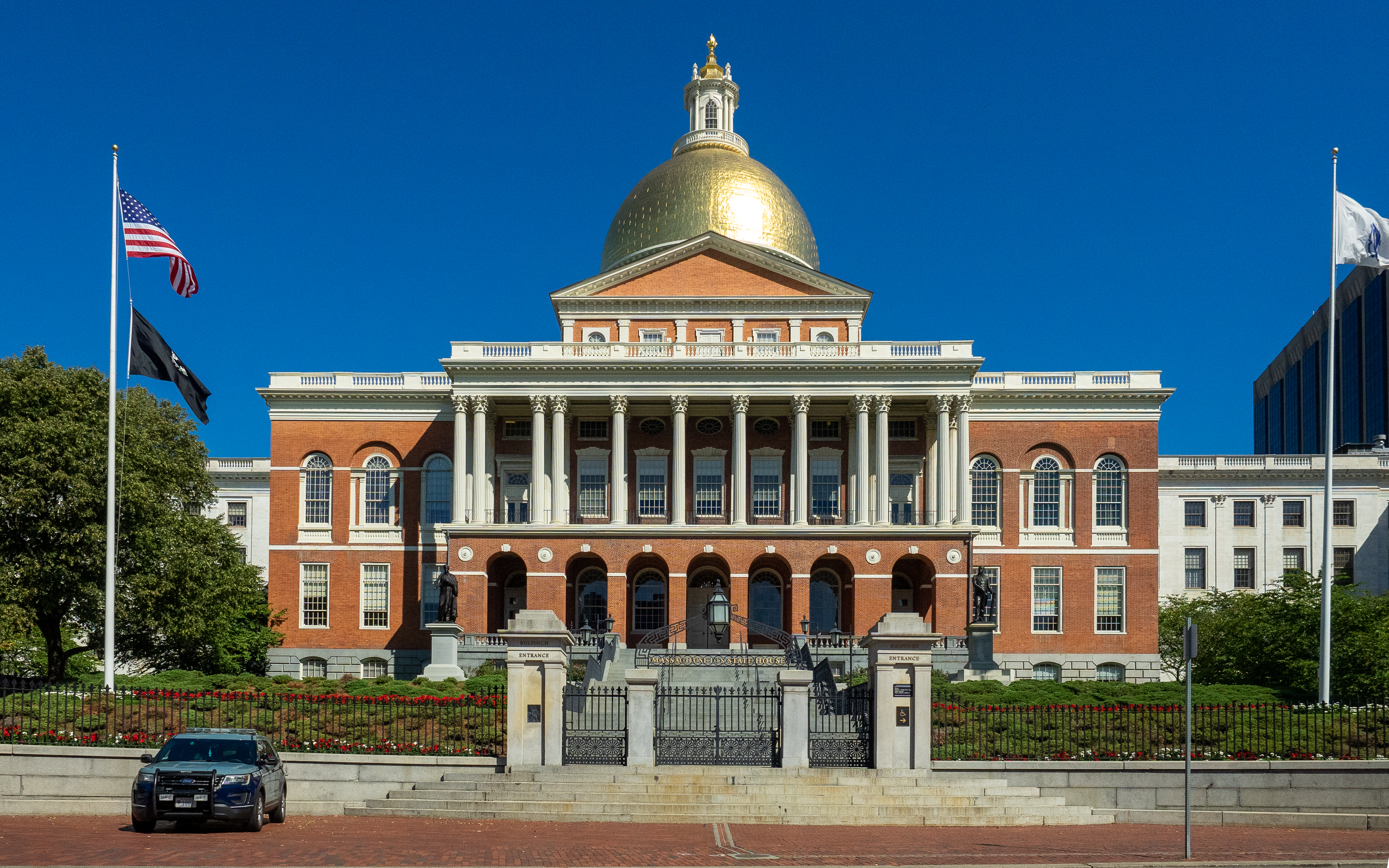
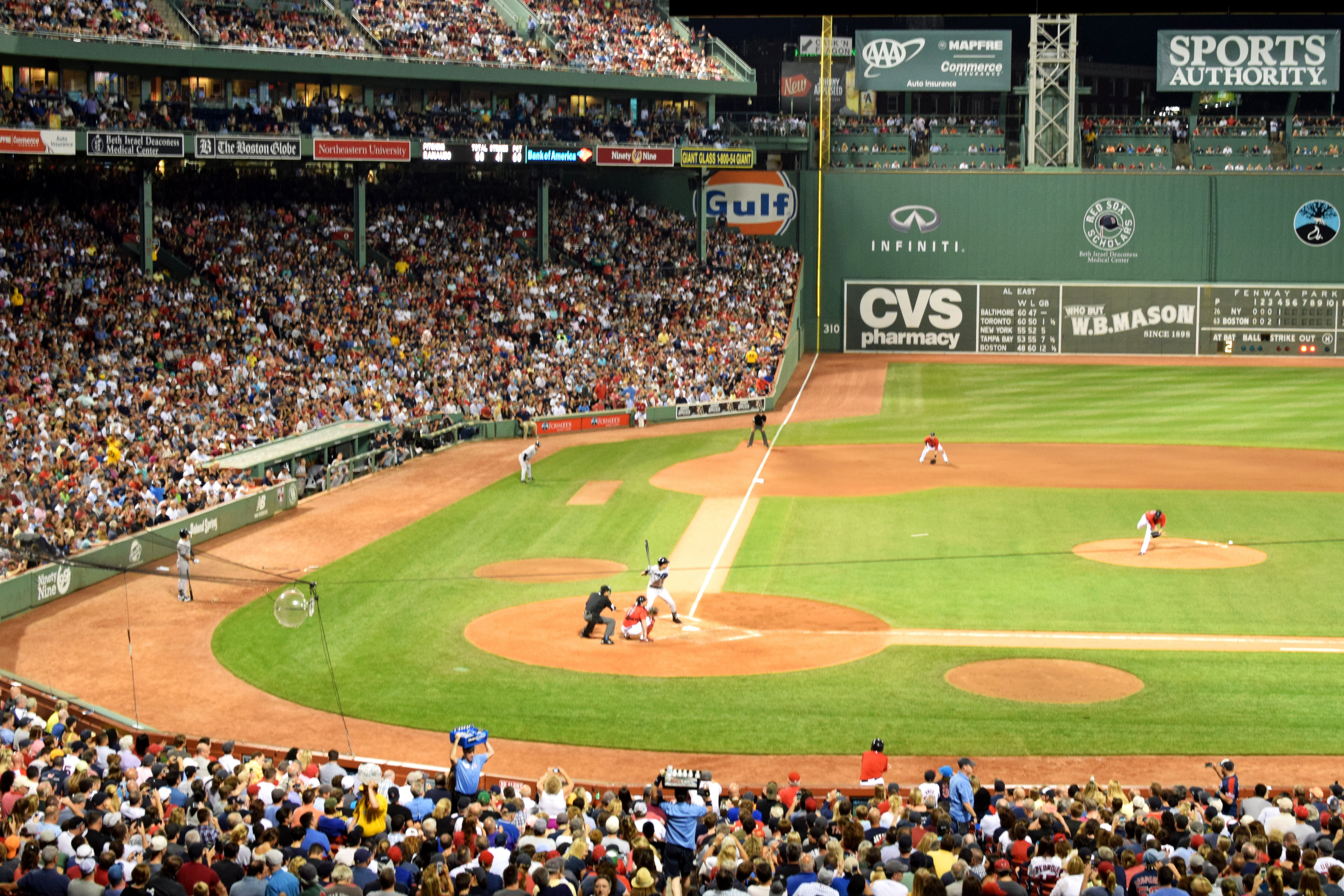
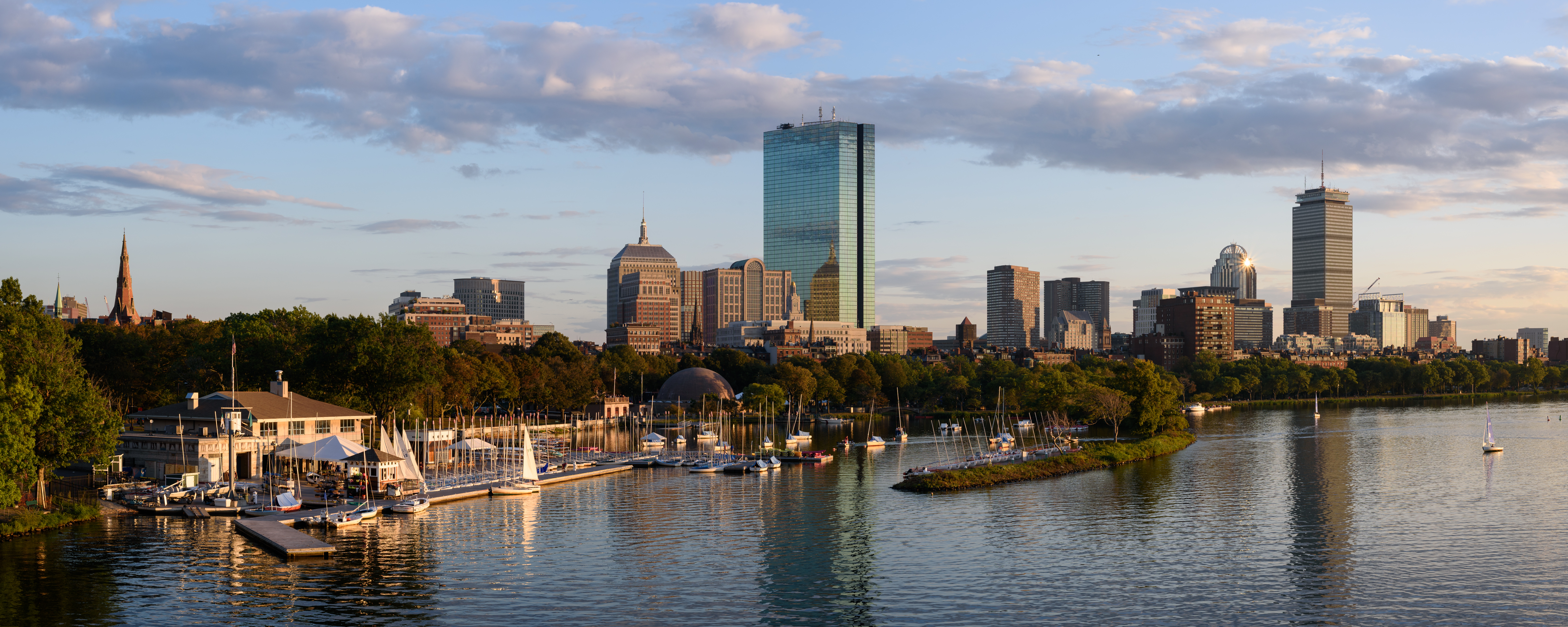
- Downtown Boston from Boston Harbor Old State House Acorn Street, Beacon Hill Massachusetts State House Fenway Park during a Boston Red Sox game Back Bay from the Charles River

- Flag Seal Wordmark
- Nicknames: Bean Town, Title Town, others
- Motto: Sicut patribus sit Deus nobis (Latin) "As God was with our fathers, so may He be with us"
- Interactive map of Boston
- Location within Greater Boston area Location within Massachusetts Location within the United States Location within Earth
- Coordinates: 42°21′37″N 71°3′28″W
- Country: United States
- Region: New England
- State: Massachusetts
- County: Suffolk
- Settled: 1625
- Incorporated (town): September 7, 1630 (date of naming, Old Style); September 17, 1630 (date of naming, New Style)
- Incorporated (city): March 19, 1822
- Named for: Boston, Lincolnshire

Government
  - Type: Strong mayor / Council
  - Mayor: Michelle Wu (D)
  - Council: Boston City Council
  - Council President: Liz Breadon (D)

Area
  - State capital: 89.61 sq mi (232.10 km^{2})
  - Land: 48.34 sq mi (125.20 km^{2})
  - Water: 41.27 sq mi (106.90 km^{2})
  - Urban: 1,655.9 sq mi (4,288.7 km^{2})
  - Metro: 4,500 sq mi (11,700 km^{2})
  - CSA: 10,700 sq mi (27,600 km^{2})
- Elevation: 46 ft (14 m)

Population (2020)
  - State capital: 675,647
  - Estimate (2025): 672,973 ▼
  - Rank: 71st in North America; 25th in the United States; 1st in Massachusetts
  - Density: 13,976.9/sq mi (5,396.51/km^{2})
  - Urban: 4,382,009 (US: 10th)
  - Urban density: 2,646/sq mi (1,021.8/km^{2})
  - Metro: 4,941,632 (US: 10th)
- Demonym: Bostonian

GDP
  - Metro: $644.814 billion (2024)
- Time zone: UTC−5 (EST)
  - Summer (DST): UTC−4 (EDT)
- ZIP Codes: 53 ZIP Codes: 02108–02137, 02163, 02196, 02199, 02201, 02203–02206, 02210–02212, 02215, 02217, 02222, 02126, 02228, 02241, 02266, 02283–02284, 02293, 02295, 02297–02298, 02467 (also includes parts of Newton and Brookline)
- Area codes: 617 and 857
- FIPS code: 25-07000
- GNIS feature ID: 617565
- Website: boston.gov

Boston (/ˈbɔːstən/ BAW-stən, /ˈbɒ-/) is the capital and most populous city of the U.S. state of Massachusetts. It serves as a cultural and financial center of New England, a region of the Northeastern United States. Boston has an area of 48.4 square miles (125 km^{2}) and a population of 675,647 as of the 2020 census, making it the third-most populous city in the Northeastern United States after New York City and Philadelphia. The larger Greater Boston metropolitan statistical area had a population of 5 million in 2025, making it the largest metropolis in New England and the eleventh-largest in the United States.

Boston was founded on Shawmut Peninsula in 1630 by English Puritan settlers, who named the city after the market town of Boston, Lincolnshire, England. During the American Revolution and Revolutionary War, Boston was home to several seminal events, including the Boston Massacre (1770), the Boston Tea Party (1773), the Battle of Bunker Hill (1775), and the Siege of Boston (1775–1776).

Following American independence from Great Britain, Boston played an important national role as a port, manufacturing hub, and education and culture center, and the city expanded significantly beyond the original peninsula by filling in land and annexing neighboring towns. Boston's many firsts include the nation's first public park (Boston Common, 1634), the first public school (Boston Latin School, 1635), and the first subway system (Tremont Street subway, 1897). By the 21st century, Boston emerged as a global leader in higher education and research, and has become the largest biotechnology hub in the world. With an economy led by finance, professional and business services, information technology, and government, the city is a national leader in medicine, engineering, and business.

== Etymology ==
Isaac Johnson—in one of his last official acts as leader of the Charlestown community before his death on September 30, 1630—named the new settlement across the river "Boston" after Johnson's hometown of Boston, Lincolnshire, from where he, his wife (namesake of the Arbella), and John Cotton (grandfather of Cotton Mather) emigrated. The name of the English town derives from its patron saint, St. Botolph, in whose church Cotton served as the rector until he and Johnson emigrated to New England. In early sources, Lincolnshire's Boston was known as "St. Botolph's town", which was later abbreviated as "Boston". Before this renaming, the settlement on the peninsula was known as "Shawmut" by William Blaxton and "Tremontaine" by the Puritan settlers he invited.

== History ==
=== Indigenous era ===
Before European colonization, the region surrounding present-day Boston was inhabited by the Massachusett people, who established small, seasonal communities in present-day Boston. In 1630, settlers led by John Winthrop arrived and found Shawmut Peninsula nearly empty of Native people. Most had died of European diseases borne by earlier settlers and traders. Archaeological excavations have unearthed one of the oldest fishweirs in New England, located on Boylston Street, which Native people constructed as early as 7,000 years before European arrival in the Western Hemisphere.

=== European settlement ===
The first European to live in what would become Boston was a University of Cambridge-educated Anglican cleric named William Blaxton. He was most directly responsible for the foundation of Boston by Puritan colonists in 1630, after Blaxton invited one of their leaders, Isaac Johnson, to cross Back Bay from the failing colony of Charlestown and share the peninsula with him. In September 1630, Puritans made the crossing to present-day Boston.

Puritan influence on Boston began even before the settlement was founded with the 1629 Cambridge Agreement, which created the Massachusetts Bay Colony and was signed by the colony's first governor, John Winthrop. Puritan ethics and their focus on education also influenced the city's early history. In 1635, America's first public school, Boston Latin School, was founded in Boston.

Boston was the largest town in the Thirteen Colonies until Philadelphia outgrew it in the mid-18th century. Boston's oceanfront location made it a lively port, and the town engaged in shipping and fishing during the colonial era. Boston was a primary stop on the Caribbean trade route and imported large amounts of molasses, which led to the creation of Boston baked beans.

Boston's economy stagnated in the decades prior to the American Revolution. By the mid-18th century, New York City and Philadelphia both surpassed Boston in wealth. During this period, Boston encountered financial difficulties even as other New England cities were growing rapidly.

=== American Revolution and Siege of Boston ===
In 1773, a group of angered Bostonian citizens threw a shipment of tea by the East India Company into Boston Harbor in protest of the Tea Act in the Boston Tea Party, a seminal event that escalated the American Revolution.

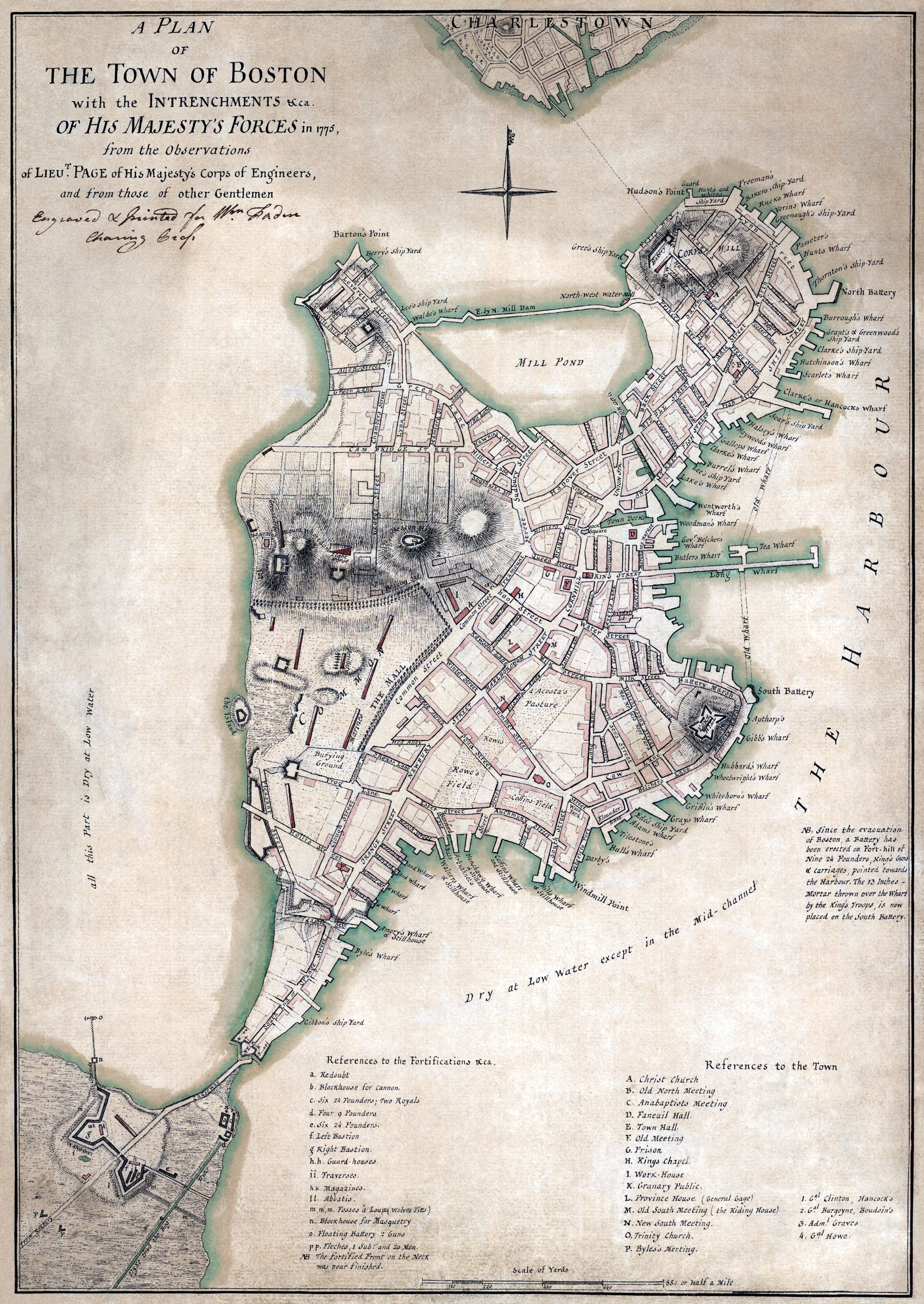
Map showing the British tactical evaluation of Boston in 1775

Boston played a central role in the American Revolution. Many crucial events of the American Revolution and subsequent American Revolutionary War occurred in or near Boston, where the city's revolutionary spirit against unpopular policies of the British Parliament was widespread and ultimately inspiring to the rest of the Thirteen Colonies. When Parliament passed the Stamp Act 1765, the homes of Andrew Oliver, the official tasked with enforcing the Act, and Thomas Hutchinson, then lieutenant governor of Massachusetts Bay Colony, were razed by Boston mobs. The British government responded by sending 2,000 troops of the 14th Foot and 29th Foot to Boston in 1768 to occupy the city and enforce Crown authority, which further inflamed tensions. In 1770, five soldiers of the 29th Foot fired into a Boston mob in what became known as the Boston Massacre, which led to the withdrawal of the occupational troops and helped fuel revolutionary sentiment in the colonies.

In May 1773, Parliament passed the Tea Act, which many colonists saw as an attempt by Parliament to compel them to accept taxes established by the Townshend Acts. This led to the Boston Tea Party, a defining event of the American Revolution in which angered Bostonians threw an entire shipment of tea sent from the East India Company into Boston Harbor, escalating the American Revolution. Parliament responded by implementing the Intolerable Acts and demanding compensation for the destroyed tea. This response, in turn, angered the colonists further, leading to the Battles of Lexington and Concord on April 19, 1775, the first battles of the American Revolutionary War, which were fought around Boston in Massachusetts Bay Colony.

During the siege of Boston from April 19, 1775, to March 17, 1776, New England-based Patriot militia impeded movement by the British Army. Sir William Howe, then commander-in-chief of British forces in North America, led the British army in the siege. On June 17, the British captured Charlestown in present-day Boston during the Battle of Bunker Hill in what proved to be a pyrrhic victory. Bunker Hill also demonstrated the skill and training of the Patriot militia, and led the British to avoid further large-scale engagements for the rest of the Boston campaign.

On June 14, 1775, in an effort to unify the Revolutionary War effort, the Second Continental Congress, convening in the colonial-era capital of Philadelphia, founded the Continental Army and unanimously appointed George Washington as its commander-in-chief. Washington then immediately departed Philadelphia for Boston, where he arrived on July 2 and led the Continental Army in the siege. Fighting was limited to small-scale raids and skirmishes, and American troops faced challenges with a deficiency of munitions and supplies. Boston Neck, then narrow and only approximately 100 feet wide, impeded Washington's ability to launch a frontal assault on Boston, which led to a prolonged stalemate between the American besiegers and the besieged British garrison. A young American officer, Rufus Putnam, came up with a plan to make portable fortifications out of wood, which were erected on the frozen ground under cover of darkness. Putnam supervised the effort, which successfully installed the fortifications and dozens of cannons on Dorchester Heights that Henry Knox brought through the snow from Fort Ticonderoga. When the British discovered the newly emplaced artillery, they responded by launching a cannon barrage for two hours, which proved unable to reach the American cannons. Perceiving that his position was untenable, Howe ordered his troops to evacuate Boston, which was carried out on March 17. The date is celebrated annually in Boston as Evacuation Day.

=== Post-Revolution and the War of 1812 ===
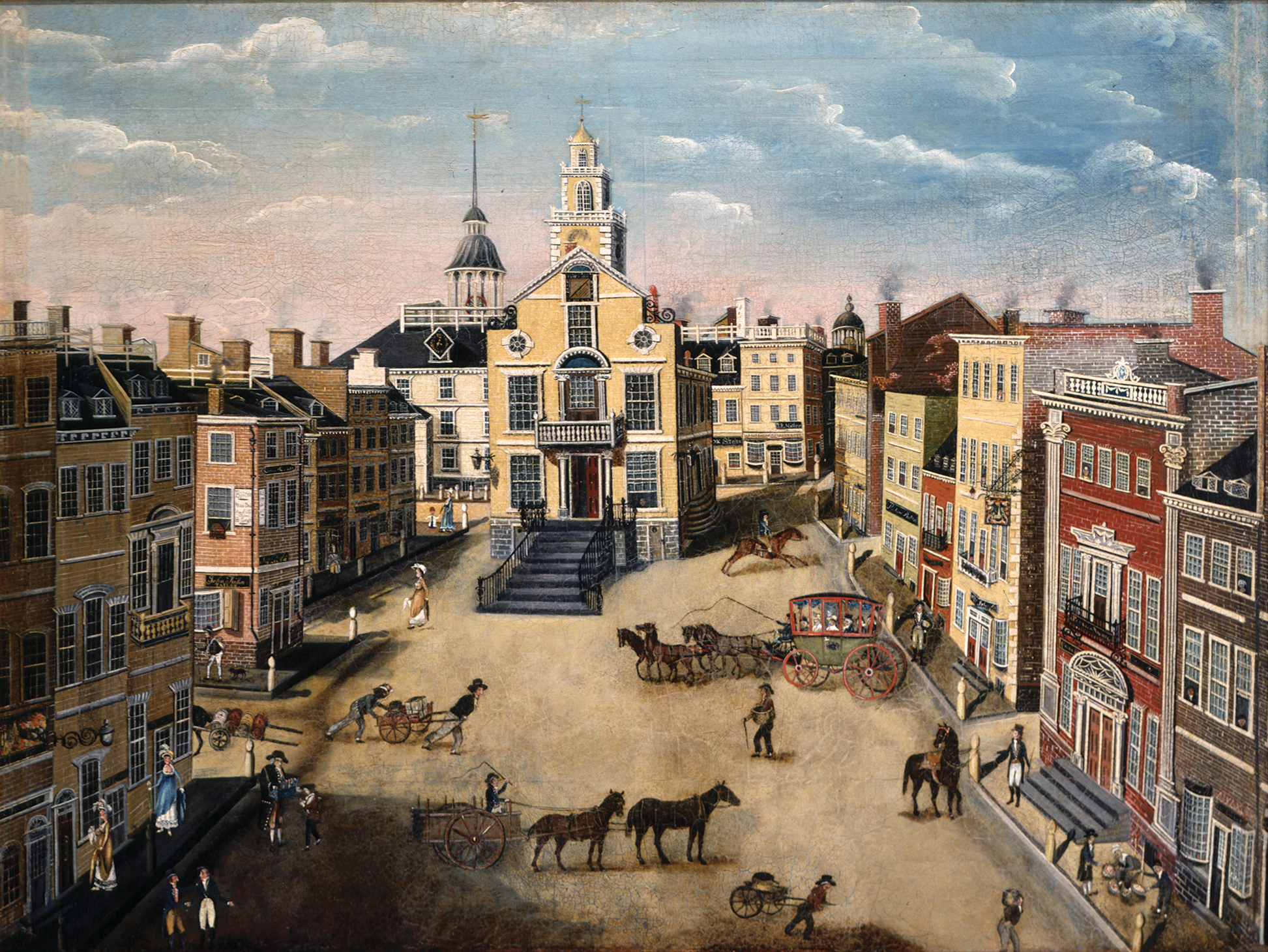
State Street in 1801

After the Revolution, Boston's long seafaring tradition helped make it one of the nation's busiest ports for both domestic and international trade. Boston's harbor activity was significantly curtailed by the Embargo Act of 1807, which was adopted during the Napoleonic Wars and the War of 1812. Foreign trade returned after these hostilities, but Boston's merchants had found alternatives for their capital investments in the meantime. Manufacturing became an important component of the city's economy, and the city's industrial manufacturing overtook international trade in economic importance by the mid-19th century. The small rivers bordering the city and connecting it to the surrounding region facilitated shipment of goods and led to a proliferation of mills and factories. Later, a dense network of railroads furthered the region's industry and commerce.

During this period, Boston also flourished culturally. It was admired for its rarefied literary life and generous artistic patronage. Members of old Boston families, later dubbed "Boston Brahmins", came to be regarded as the nation's social and cultural elites. They are often associated with the American upper class, Harvard University, and the Episcopal Church.

Boston was a prominent port of the Atlantic slave trade in the New England Colonies, but was soon overtaken by Salem, Massachusetts, and Newport, Rhode Island. Boston eventually became a center of the American abolitionist movement. The city reacted largely negatively to the Fugitive Slave Act of 1850, contributing to President Franklin Pierce's attempt to make an example of Boston after Anthony Burns's attempt to escape to freedom.

In 1822, the citizens of Boston voted to change the official name from the "Town of Boston" to the "City of Boston", and on March 19, 1822, the people of Boston accepted the charter incorporating the city. At the time Boston was chartered as a city, the population was about 46,226, while the area of the city was only 4.8 sq mi (12 km^{2}).

=== 19th century ===
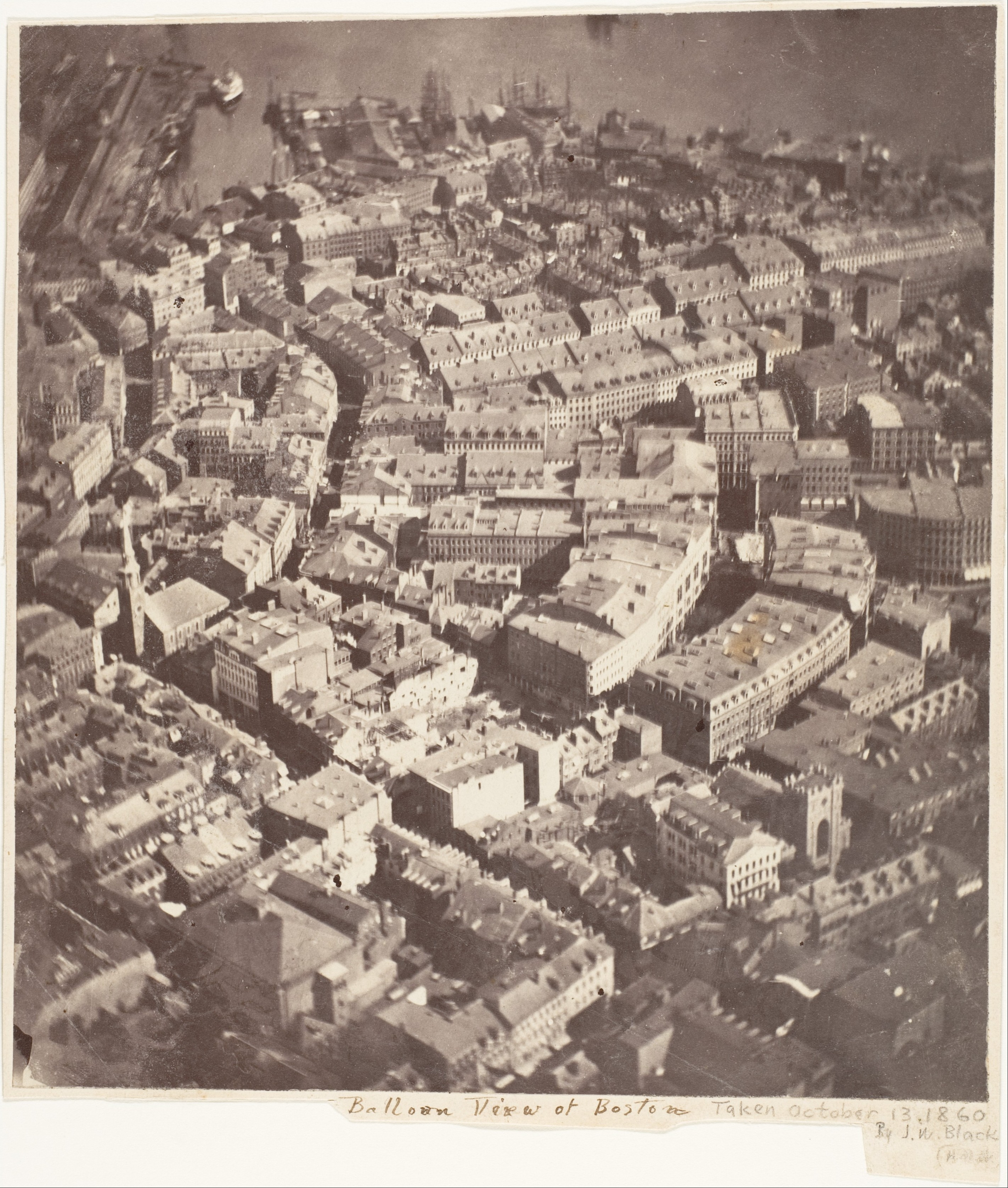
Boston, as the Eagle and the Wild Goose See It, an 1860 photograph by James Wallace Black, the first recorded aerial photograph

In the 1820s, Boston's population grew rapidly, and the city's ethnic composition changed dramatically with the first wave of European immigrants. Irish immigrants dominated the first wave of newcomers during this period, especially following the Great Famine; by 1850, about 35,000 Irish lived in Boston. In the latter half of the 19th century, the city saw increasing numbers of Irish, Germans, Lebanese, Syrians, French Canadians, and Russian and Polish Jews settling there.

By the end of the 19th century, Boston's core neighborhoods had become enclaves of ethnically distinct immigrants, with their residence yielding lasting cultural change. Italians became the largest inhabitants of the North End, Irish dominated South Boston and Charlestown, and Russian Jews lived in the West End. Irish and Italian immigrants brought with them Roman Catholicism. Currently, Catholics make up Boston's largest religious community, and the Irish have played a major role in Boston politics since the early 20th century; prominent figures include the Kennedys, Tip O'Neill, and John F. Fitzgerald.

Between 1631 and 1890, the city tripled its area through land reclamation by filling in marshes, mud flats, and gaps between wharves along the waterfront. Reclamation projects in the middle of the 19th century created significant parts of the South End, the West End, the Financial District, and Chinatown.

After the Great Boston Fire of 1872, workers used building rubble as landfill along the downtown waterfront. During the mid-to-late 19th century, workers filled almost 600 acres (240 ha) of brackish Charles River marshlands west of Boston Common with gravel brought by rail from the hills of Needham Heights. The city annexed the adjacent towns of South Boston (1804), East Boston (1836), Roxbury (1868), Dorchester (including present-day Mattapan and a portion of South Boston) (1870), Brighton (including present-day Allston) (1874), West Roxbury (including present-day Jamaica Plain and Roslindale) (1874), Charlestown (1874), and Hyde Park (1912). Other proposals were unsuccessful for the annexation of Brookline, Cambridge, and Chelsea.

=== 20th century ===
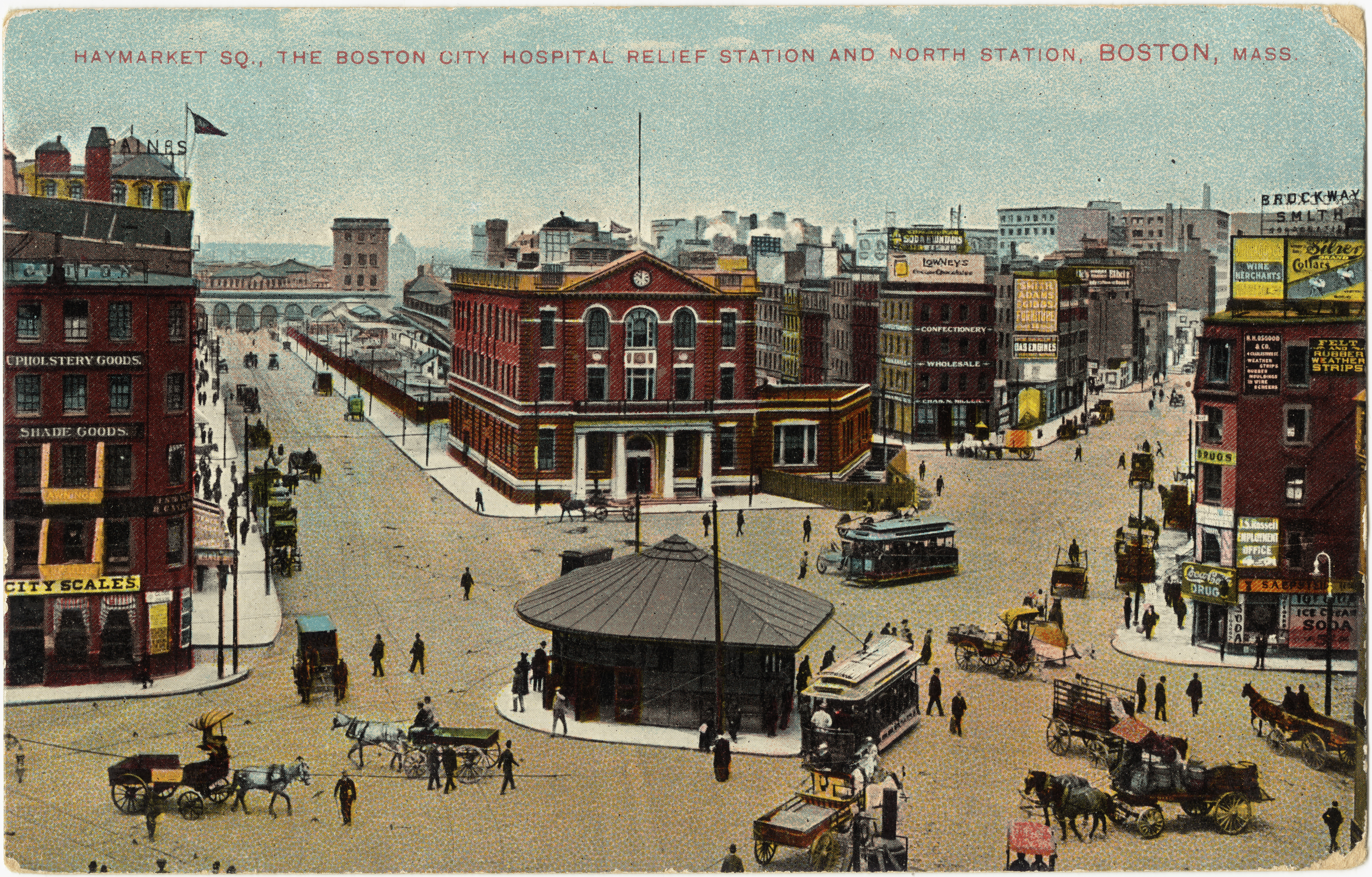
Haymarket Square in 1909

Many architecturally significant buildings were built during the early years of the 20th century: Horticultural Hall, the Tennis and Racquet Club, Isabella Stewart Gardner Museum, Fenway Studios, Jordan Hall, and the Boston Opera House. The Longfellow Bridge, built in 1906, was mentioned by Robert McCloskey in Make Way for Ducklings, describing its "salt and pepper shakers" feature. Fenway Park, home of the Boston Red Sox, opened in 1912, with the Boston Garden opening in 1928. Logan International Airport opened on September 8, 1923.

On January 15, 1919, a flood of molasses in the North End killed 21 people and injured 150.

On November 28, 1942, Boston's Cocoanut Grove nightclub was the site of the Cocoanut Grove fire, the deadliest nightclub fire in United States history, killing 492 people and injuring hundreds more.

By the early- to mid-20th century, Boston declined economically as factories became old and obsolete and businesses moved out of the region for cheaper labor elsewhere. Boston responded by initiating various urban renewal projects, under the direction of the Boston Redevelopment Authority (BRA) established in 1957. In 1958, BRA initiated a project to improve the historic West End neighborhood. Extensive demolition was met with strong public opposition, and thousands of families were displaced.

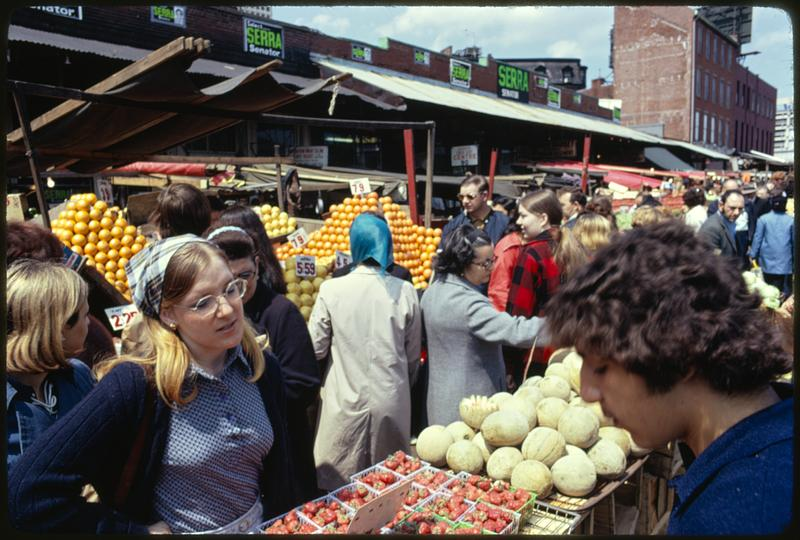
Outdoor market at Haymarket Square in 1973

The BRA continued implementing eminent domain projects, including the clearance of the vibrant Scollay Square area for construction of the modernist-style Government Center. In 1965, the Columbia Point Health Center opened in the Dorchester neighborhood, the first Community Health Center in the United States. It mostly served the massive Columbia Point public housing complex adjoining it, which was built in 1953. The health center is still in operation and was rededicated in 1990 as the Geiger-Gibson Community Health Center. The Columbia Point complex itself was redeveloped and revitalized from 1984 to 1990 into a mixed-income residential development called Harbor Point Apartments.

By the 1970s, the city's economy had begun to recover after 30 years of economic downturn. A large number of high-rises were constructed in the Financial District and in Boston's Back Bay during this period. This boom continued into the mid-1980s and resumed after a few pauses. Hospitals such as Massachusetts General Hospital, Beth Israel Deaconess Medical Center, and Brigham and Women's Hospital lead the nation in medical innovation and patient care. Schools such as the Boston Architectural College, Boston College, Boston University, Harvard Medical School, Tufts University School of Medicine, Northeastern University, Massachusetts College of Art and Design, Wentworth Institute of Technology, Berklee College of Music, Boston Conservatory, and others attract students to the area. Nevertheless, the city experienced conflict starting in 1974 over desegregation busing, which resulted in unrest and violence around public schools throughout the mid-1970s. Boston has also experienced gentrification in the latter half of the 20th century, with housing prices increasing sharply since the 1990s when the city's rent control regime was struck down by statewide ballot proposition.

=== 21st century ===
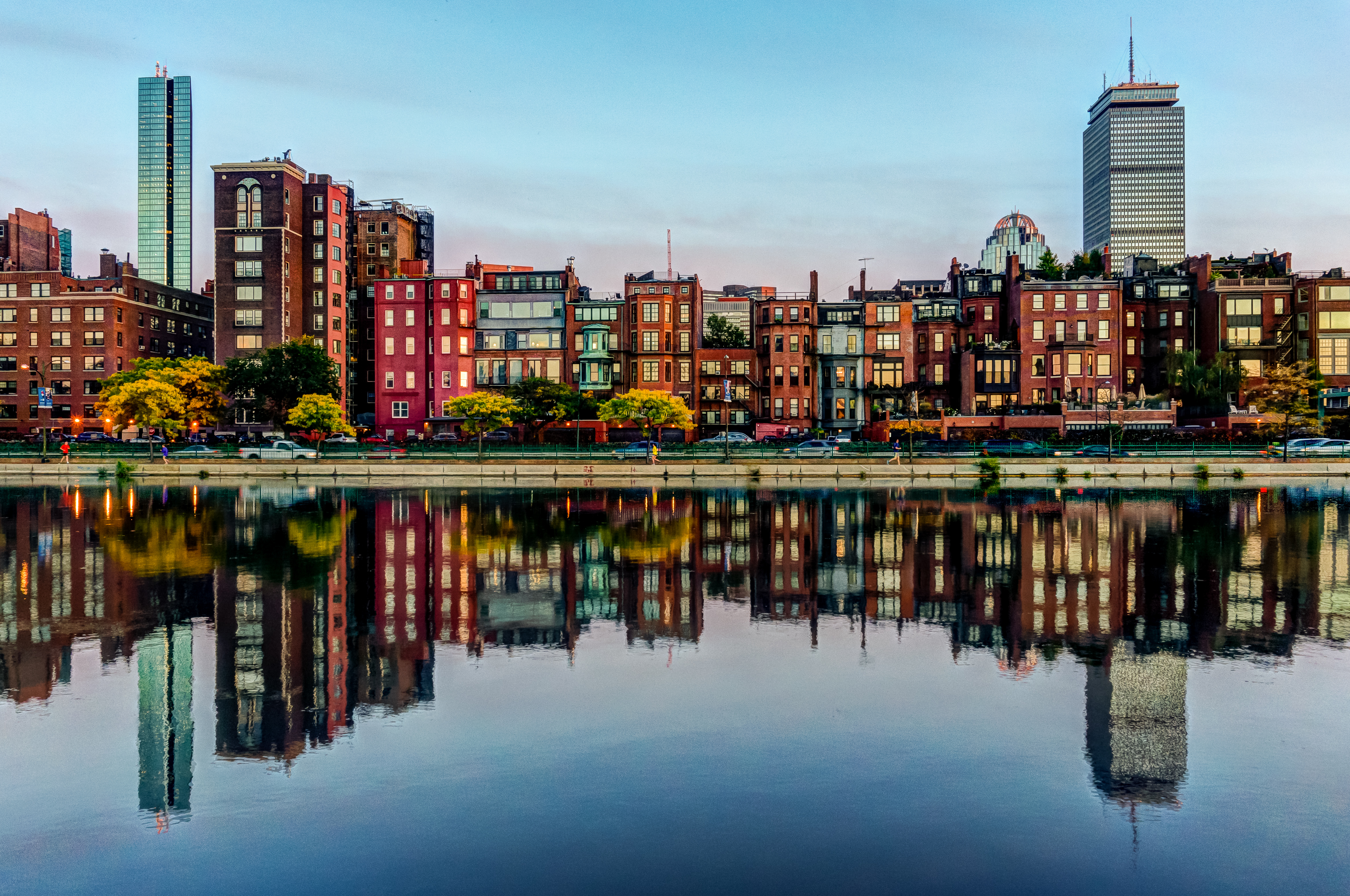
The Charles River in front of Boston's Back Bay neighborhood in 2013

Boston is an intellectual, technological, and political center. However, it has lost some important regional institutions, including the loss to mergers and acquisitions of local financial institutions such as FleetBoston Financial, which was acquired by Charlotte-based Bank of America in 2004. Boston-based department stores Jordan Marsh and Filene's have both merged into the New York City–based Macy's. The 1993 acquisition of The Boston Globe by The New York Times was reversed in 2013 when it was resold to Boston businessman John W. Henry. In 2016, it was announced that General Electric would be moving its corporate headquarters from Connecticut to the Seaport District in Boston, joining many other companies in this rapidly developing neighborhood. The city also saw the completion of the Central Artery/Tunnel Project, known as the Big Dig, in 2007 after many delays and cost overruns.

On April 15, 2013, two Chechen Islamist brothers detonated a pair of bombs near the finish line of the Boston Marathon, killing three people and injuring roughly 264. The subsequent search for the bombers led to a lock-down of Boston and surrounding municipalities. The region showed solidarity during this time as symbolized by the slogan Boston Strong.

In 2016, Boston briefly shouldered a bid as the U.S. applicant for the 2024 Summer Olympics. The bid was supported by the mayor and a coalition of business leaders and local philanthropists, but was eventually dropped due to public opposition. The USOC then selected Los Angeles to be the American candidate with Los Angeles ultimately securing the right to host the 2028 Summer Olympics. Boston was one of eleven U.S. cities which hosted matches during the 2026 FIFA World Cup, with games taking place at Gillette Stadium in nearby Foxboro.

== Geography ==
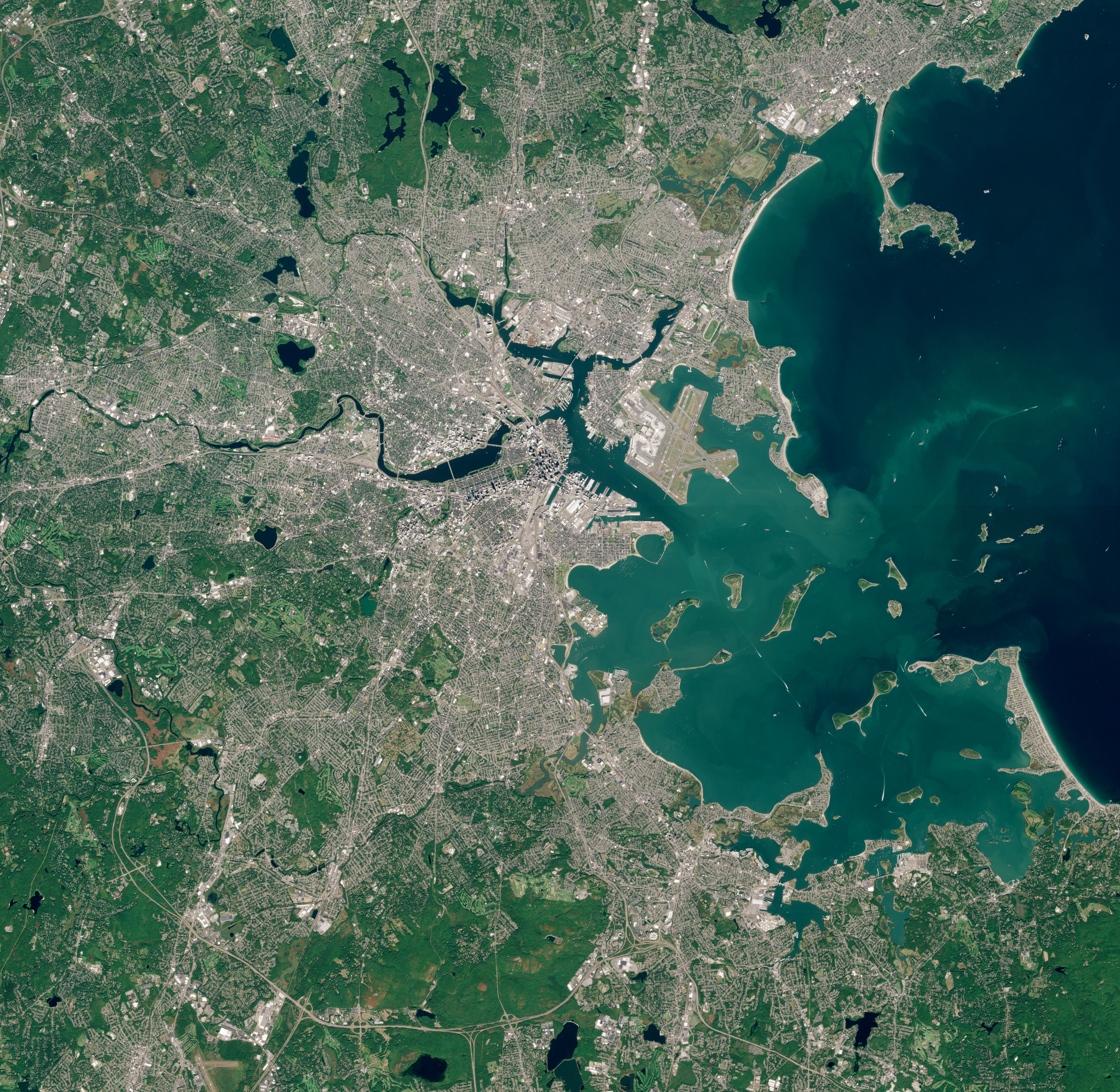
Boston and its neighbors with Boston Harbor, as seen from Sentinel-2

An 1877 panoramic map of Boston

The geographical center of Boston is in Roxbury. Due north of the center we find the South End. This is not to be confused with South Boston, which lies directly east of the South End. North of South Boston is East Boston, and southwest of East Boston is the North End

— Unknown, A local colloquialism

Boston has an area of 89.63 sq mi (232.1 km^{2}). Of this area, 48.4 sq mi (125.4 km^{2}), or 54%, of it is land and 41.2 sq mi (106.7 km^{2}), or 46%, of it is water. The city's elevation, as measured at Logan International Airport, is 19 ft (5.8 m) above sea level. The highest point in Boston is Bellevue Hill at 330 ft (100 m) above sea level. The lowest point is at sea level. The city is adjacent to Boston Harbor, an arm of Massachusetts Bay, and by extension, the Atlantic Ocean.

Boston is surrounded by the Greater Boston metropolitan region. It is bordered to the east by the town of Winthrop and the Boston Harbor Islands, to the northeast by the cities of Revere, Chelsea and Everett, to the north by the cities of Somerville and Cambridge, to the northwest by Watertown, to the west by the city of Newton and town of Brookline, to the southwest by the town of Dedham and small portions of Needham and Canton, and to the southeast by the town of Milton, and the city of Quincy.

The Charles River separates Boston's Allston-Brighton, Fenway-Kenmore and Back Bay neighborhoods from Watertown and Cambridge, and most of Boston from its own Charlestown neighborhood. The Neponset River forms the boundary between Boston's southern neighborhoods and Quincy and Milton. The Mystic River separates Charlestown from Chelsea and Everett, and Chelsea Creek and Boston Harbor separate East Boston from Downtown, the North End, and the Seaport.

=== Neighborhoods ===
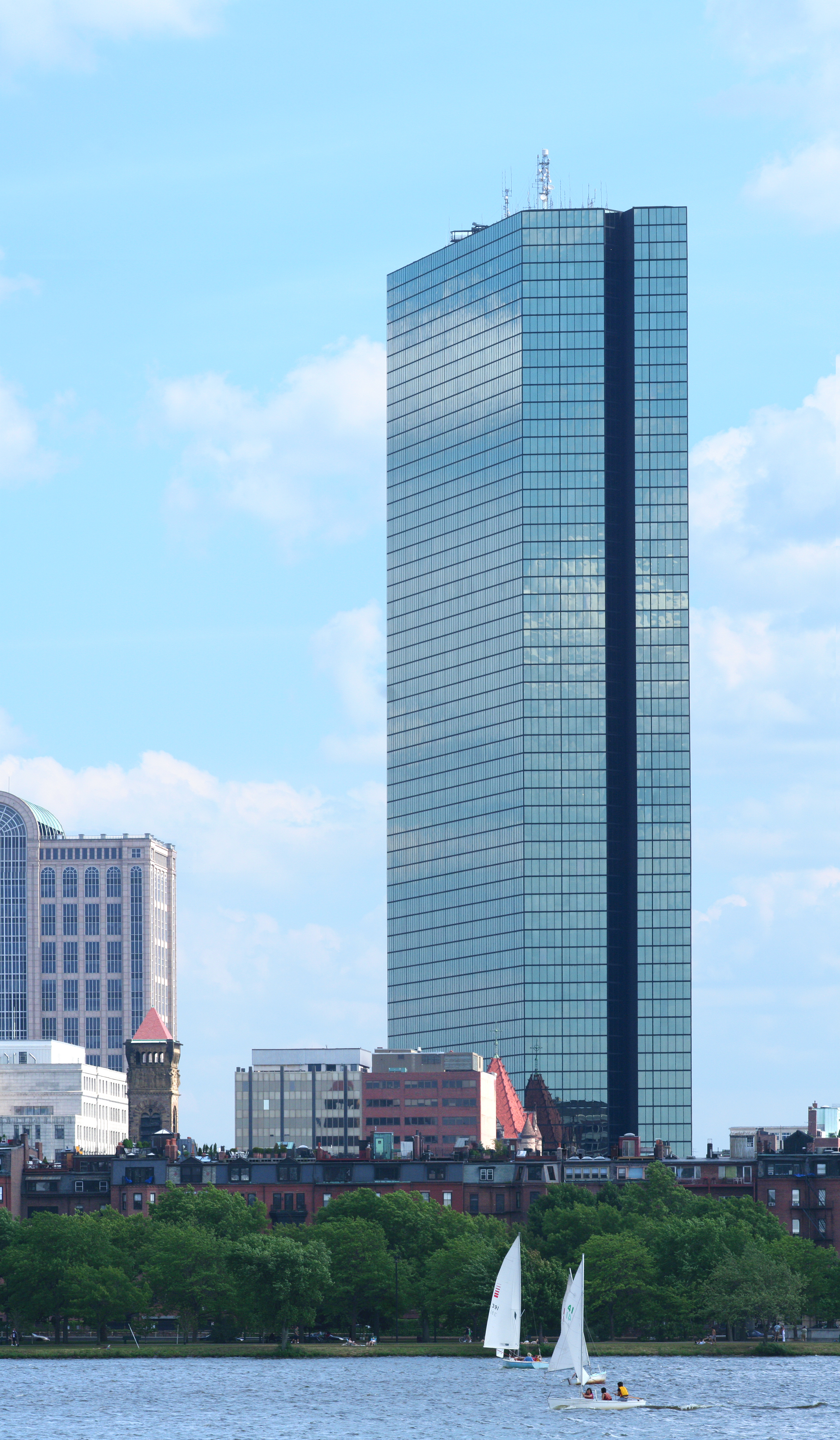
John Hancock Tower at 200 Clarendon Street, the tallest building in Boston, with a roof height of 790 ft (240 m)

Boston is sometimes called a "city of neighborhoods" because of the profusion of diverse subsections. The city government's Office of Neighborhood Services has designated 23 neighborhoods:

- Allston
- Back Bay
- Bay Village
- Beacon Hill
- Brighton
- Charlestown
- Chinatown
- Dorchester
- Downtown or Financial District
- East Boston (Eastie by locals)
- Fenway or Fenway-Kenmore
- Hyde Park
- Jamaica Plain
- Mattapan
- Mission Hill
- North End
- Roslindale
- Roxbury
- Seaport District or Seaport
- South Boston (Southie by locals)
- the South End
- the West End
- West Roxbury

More than two-thirds of inner Boston's modern land area did not exist when the city was founded. Instead, it was created via the gradual filling in of the surrounding tidal areas over the centuries. This was accomplished using earth from the leveling or lowering of Boston's three original hills, the "Trimountain", after which Tremont Street is named, and with gravel brought by train from Needham to fill the Back Bay.

Back Bay is home to Christian Science Center, Copley Square, Newbury Street, and New England's two tallest buildings: the John Hancock Tower and the Prudential Center. Near the John Hancock Tower is the old John Hancock Building with its prominent illuminated beacon, the color of which forecasts the weather.

Downtown and its immediate surroundings (including the Financial District, Government Center, and South Boston) consist largely of low-rise masonry buildings – often federal style and Greek revival – interspersed with modern high-rises. Back Bay includes many prominent landmarks, such as the Boston Public Library, Trinity Church, single-family homes and wooden/brick multi-family row houses. The South End Historic District is the largest surviving contiguous Victorian-era neighborhood in the US.

The geography of downtown and South Boston was particularly affected by the Central Artery/Tunnel Project (which ran from 1991 to 2007 and was known unofficially as the "Big Dig"). That project removed the elevated Central Artery and incorporated new green spaces and open areas.

=== Environment ===
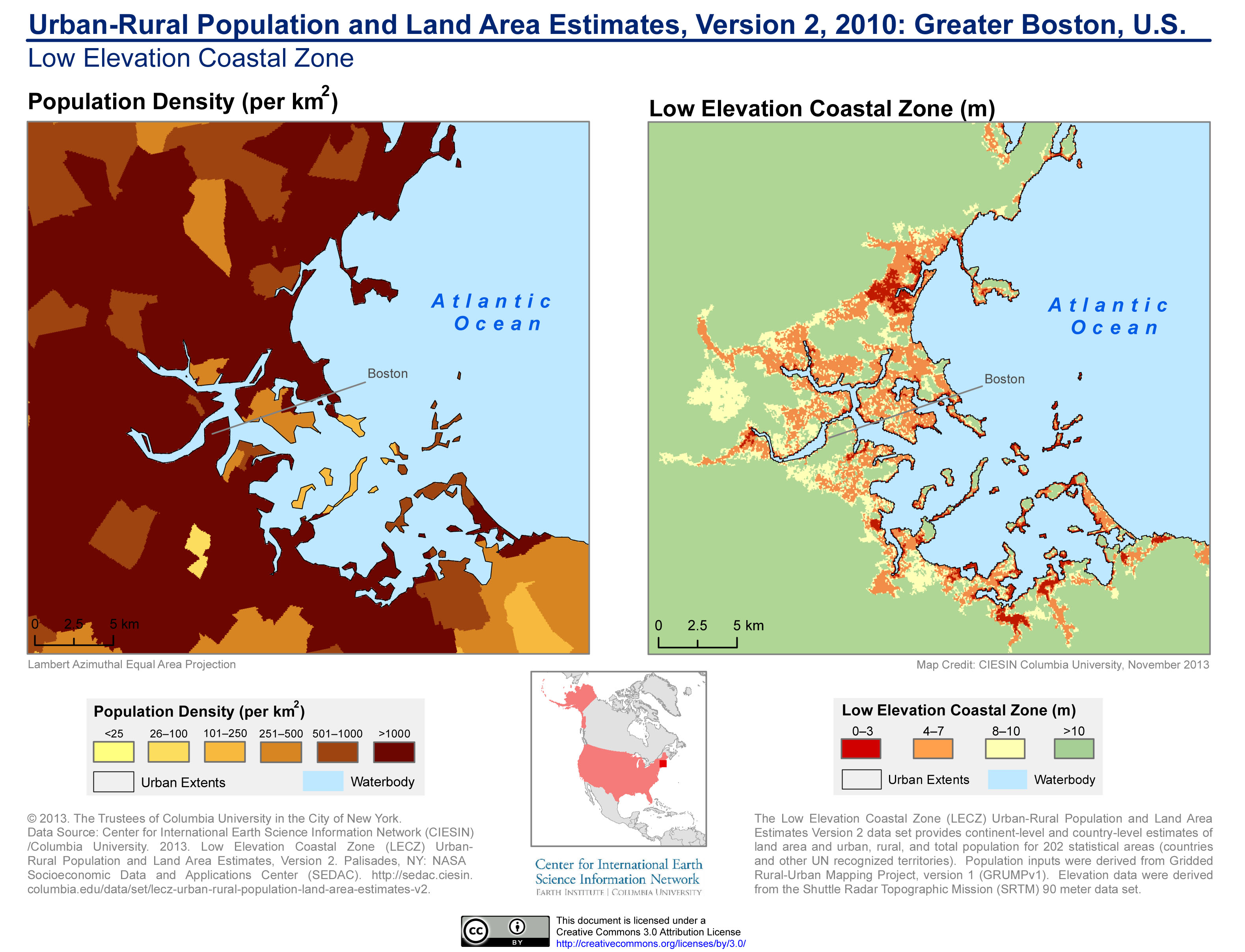
Greater Boston's 2010 population density and elevation above sea level

Boston is located within the Boston Basin ecoregion, which is characterized by low and rolling hills with a number of ponds, lakes, and reservoirs. Forests are mainly transition hardwoods such as oak-hickory mixed with white pine. As a coastal city built largely on fill, sea-level rise is of major concern to the city government. A climate action plan from 2019 anticipates 2 ft (1 m) to more than 7 ft (2 m) of sea-level rise in Boston by the end of the 21st century. Many older buildings in certain areas of Boston are supported by wooden piles driven into the area's fill; these piles remain sound if submerged in water, but are subject to dry rot if exposed to air for long periods. Groundwater levels have been dropping in many areas of the city, due in part to an increase in the amount of rainwater discharged directly into sewers rather than absorbed by the ground. The Boston Groundwater Trust coordinates monitoring groundwater levels throughout the city via a network of public and private monitoring wells.

The city developed a climate action plan covering carbon reduction in buildings, transportation, and energy use. The first such plan was commissioned in 2007, with updates released in 2011, 2014, and 2019. This plan includes the Building Energy Reporting and Disclosure Ordinance, which requires the city's larger buildings to disclose their yearly energy and water use statistics and to partake in an energy assessment every five years. A separate initiative, Resilient Boston Harbor, lays out neighborhood-specific recommendations for coastal resilience. In 2013, Mayor Thomas Menino introduced the Renew Boston Whole Building Incentive which reduces the cost of living in buildings that are deemed energy efficient.

=== Climate ===
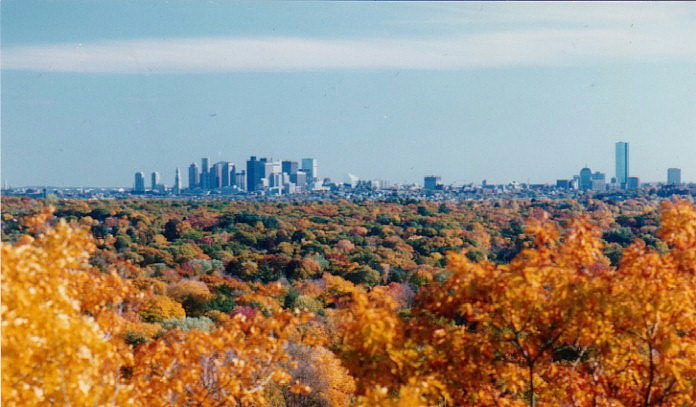
Boston's skyline in the sunny background with fall foliage in the foreground

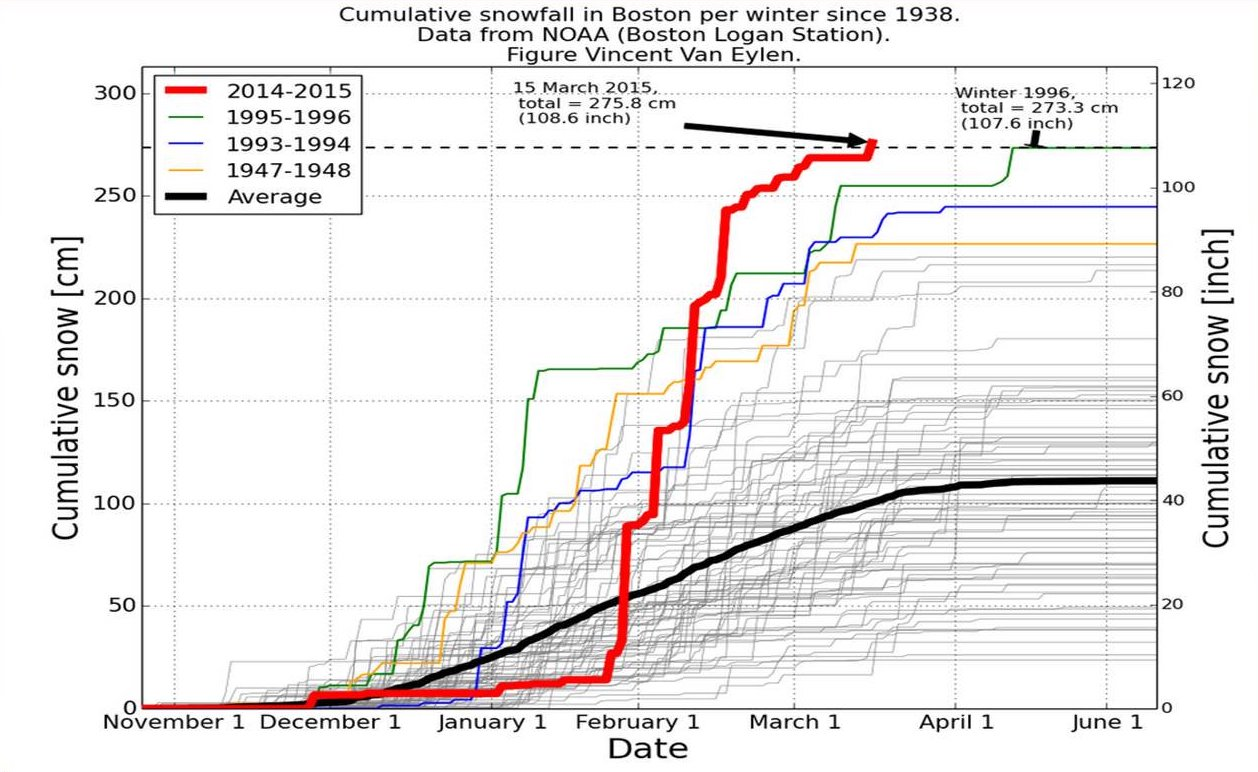
A graph of cumulative winter snowfall at Logan International Airport from 1938 to 2015, highlighting the four winters with the most snowfall

The city features a weather forecast office of the National Weather Service, which serves all of Eastern Massachusetts, the Boston Harbor, along with portions of New Hampshire, Maine, and Rhode Island. Under the Köppen climate classification (using the 27 °F (−3 °C) coldest month isotherm), Boston has a humid subtropical climate (Köppen Cfa). If using the 32 °F (0 °C) coldest month isotherm, the city lies within the hot-summer humid continental zone (Köppen Dfa). Summers are warm to hot and humid. Winters are cold and stormy, with occasional periods of heavy snow. Spring and fall are usually cool and mild, with varying conditions dependent on wind direction and the position of the jet stream. Prevailing wind patterns that blow offshore minimize the influence of the Atlantic Ocean. In winter, areas near the immediate coast often see more rain than snow, as warm air is sometimes drawn off the Atlantic. Boston lies at the border between USDA plant hardiness zones 6b (away from the coastline) and 7a (close to the coastline). Receiving over 2,600 hours of sunshine annually, Boston is one of the sunniest oceanic cities located at its latitude globally.

The warmest month is July, with a mean temperature of 74.1 °F (23.4 °C). The coldest month is January, with a mean temperature of 29.9 °F (−1.2 °C). Periods exceeding 90 °F (32 °C) in summer and below freezing in winter are not uncommon but tend to be fairly short, with about 13 and 25 days per year seeing each, respectively. Despite average winter temperatures near freezing, Boston can see entire winters without sustained periods of sub-freezing afternoons. The winter of 2001-2002 recorded only two days entirely below freezing, with no day with a daily maximum temperature below 29 °F (−2 °C). The winter of 2023-2024 saw the yearly minimum temperature not fall below 14 °F (−10 °C) that winter. The average year typically sees 29 days at or above 86 °F (30 °C), 3 of which at or above 95 °F (35 °C). The year 1983 saw a record 52 days at or above 86 °F (30 °C), a record 30 days of which were at or above 90 °F (32 °C); and the year 1949 saw a record 14 days at or above 95 °F (35 °C).

Sub- 0 °F (−18 °C) readings usually occur every 3 to 5 years. The most recent sub- 0 °F (−18 °C) reading occurred on February 4, 2023, when the temperature dipped down to −10 °F (−23 °C). This was the lowest temperature reading in Boston since 1957. Several decades may pass between 100 °F (38 °C) readings. The last such reading occurred on July 3, 2026. Boston's average window for freezing temperatures is November 9 to April 5. (Note: The average number of days with a low at or below freezing is 94.) Official temperature records have ranged from −18 °F (−28 °C) on February 9, 1934, up to 104 °F (40 °C) on July 4, 1911. The record cold daily maximum is 2 °F (−17 °C) on December 30, 1917. The record warm daily minimum is 83 °F (28 °C) on both August 2, 1975 and July 21, 2019.

The record high dew point is 79 °F (26 °C) recorded on August 10, 2001. The most humid month on record is August 2018 with an average dewpoint of 66.8 °F (19.3 °C) for the month. The hottest month on record is July 2019 with an average mean temperature of 78.7 °F (25.9 °C) for the month. The month with the record warmest daily minimums was July 2019 with an average daily minimum of 70.7 °F (21.5 °C)., and the record warmest daily maximums was July 1983, with an average daily maximum of 87.2 °F (30.7 °C). Boston has recorded entire months in summer without nighttime lows below 63 °F (17 °C), the record most recently tied in August 2022 and previously set in July 2011 and July 2019. 2022 also recorded an entire month in summer without a daily maximum temperature below 75 °F (24 °C), the record highest for the monthly minimum of daily maximum temperature. Summer in Boston can also see entire months without dewpoints below 53 °F (12 °C), with the most recent occurrence being July 2008. Boston has not recorded a summer since records began without at least one instance of a 91 °F (33 °C) temperature, one daily minimum of at least 69 °F (21 °C) or higher, and a dewpoint of 71 °F (22 °C) or greater. The summers where the yearly maximum dew point topped out at 71 °F (22 °C) were in 1974 and 1982; the yearly maximum daily minimum temperature at 69 °F (21 °C) in 1889; and a yearly maximum temperature was 91 °F (33 °C), recorded in 1889 and 1996. The average yearly maximum daily minimum temperature is 76.9 °F (24.9 °C), and the average yearly maximum dew point is 75.4 °F (24.1 °C).

Boston averages 43.6 in (1,110 mm) of precipitation a year, with 49.2 in (125 cm) of snowfall per season. Most snowfall occurs from mid-November to early April. Snow is rare in May and October. There is high year-to-year variability in snowfall. For instance, the winter of 2011–12 saw only 9.3 in (23.6 cm) of accumulating snow, but the previous winter, the corresponding figure was 81.0 in (206 cm). (Note: Seasonal snowfall accumulation has ranged from 9.0 in (22.9 cm) in 1936–37 to 110.6 in (2.81 m) in 2014–15.) Boston's coastal location on the North Atlantic makes the city very prone to nor'easters, which can produce large amounts of snow and rain.

Fog is relatively common, particularly in spring and early summer. Due to its coastal location, Boston often receives sea breezes, especially in the late spring, when water temperatures are still quite cold and temperatures at the coast can be more than 20 °F (11 °C) colder than a few miles inland, sometimes dropping by that amount near midday. Thunderstorms typically occur from May to September. Occasionally, they can become severe, with large hail, damaging winds, and heavy downpours. Although downtown Boston has never been struck by a violent tornado, Boston has experienced many tornado warnings. Damaging storms are more common to areas north, west, and northwest of the city.

Boston (Logan Airport)

Climate chart (precipitation, max. and min. temperature)
J	F	M	A	M	J	J	A	S	O	N	D
3.4 37 23	3.2 39 25	4.2 46 31	3.6 56 41	3.3 67 50	3.9 76 60	3.3 82 66	3.2 80 65	3.6 73 58	4 62 48	3.7 52 38	4.3 42 29
- █ Average max. and min. temperatures in °F
- █ Precipitation totals in inches
- Source: NOAA
Metric conversion
J	F	M	A	M	J	J	A	S	O	N	D
86 3 −5	81 4 −4	107 8 0	91 14 5	84 19 10	99 25 15	84 28 19	81 27 18	91 23 15	102 17 9	94 11 3	109 6 −2
- █ Average max. and min. temperatures in °C
- █ Precipitation totals in mm

Climate data for Boston, Massachusetts (Logan Airport), 1991−2020 normals, (Note: Mean monthly maxima and minima (i.e. the expected highest and lowest temperature readings at any point during the year or given month) calculated based on data at said location from 1991 to 2020.) extremes 1872−present (Note: Official records for Boston were kept at downtown from January 1872 to December 1935, and at Logan Airport (KBOS) since January 1936.)
Month	Jan	Feb	Mar	Apr	May	Jun	Jul	Aug	Sep	Oct	Nov	Dec	Year
Record high °F (°C)	74 (23)	73 (23)	89 (32)	94 (34)	97 (36)	102 (39)	104 (40)	102 (39)	102 (39)	90 (32)	83 (28)	76 (24)	104 (40)
Mean maximum °F (°C)	58.3 (14.6)	57.9 (14.4)	67.0 (19.4)	79.9 (26.6)	88.1 (31.2)	92.2 (33.4)	95.0 (35.0)	93.7 (34.3)	88.9 (31.6)	79.6 (26.4)	70.2 (21.2)	61.2 (16.2)	96.4 (35.8)
Mean daily maximum °F (°C)	36.8 (2.7)	39.0 (3.9)	45.5 (7.5)	56.4 (13.6)	66.5 (19.2)	76.2 (24.6)	82.1 (27.8)	80.4 (26.9)	73.1 (22.8)	62.1 (16.7)	51.6 (10.9)	42.2 (5.7)	59.3 (15.2)
Daily mean °F (°C)	29.9 (−1.2)	31.8 (−0.1)	38.3 (3.5)	48.6 (9.2)	58.4 (14.7)	68.0 (20.0)	74.1 (23.4)	72.7 (22.6)	65.6 (18.7)	54.8 (12.7)	44.7 (7.1)	35.7 (2.1)	51.9 (11.1)
Mean daily minimum °F (°C)	23.1 (−4.9)	24.6 (−4.1)	31.1 (−0.5)	40.8 (4.9)	50.3 (10.2)	59.7 (15.4)	66.0 (18.9)	65.1 (18.4)	58.2 (14.6)	47.5 (8.6)	37.9 (3.3)	29.2 (−1.6)	44.5 (6.9)
Mean minimum °F (°C)	4.8 (−15.1)	8.3 (−13.2)	15.6 (−9.1)	31.0 (−0.6)	41.2 (5.1)	49.7 (9.8)	58.6 (14.8)	57.7 (14.3)	46.7 (8.2)	35.1 (1.7)	24.4 (−4.2)	13.1 (−10.5)	2.6 (−16.3)
Record low °F (°C)	−13 (−25)	−18 (−28)	−8 (−22)	11 (−12)	31 (−1)	41 (5)	50 (10)	46 (8)	34 (1)	25 (−4)	−2 (−19)	−17 (−27)	−18 (−28)
Average precipitation inches (mm)	3.39 (86)	3.21 (82)	4.17 (106)	3.63 (92)	3.25 (83)	3.89 (99)	3.27 (83)	3.23 (82)	3.56 (90)	4.03 (102)	3.66 (93)	4.30 (109)	43.59 (1,107)
Average snowfall inches (cm)	14.3 (36)	14.4 (37)	9.0 (23)	1.6 (4.1)	0.0 (0.0)	0.0 (0.0)	0.0 (0.0)	0.0 (0.0)	0.0 (0.0)	0.2 (0.51)	0.7 (1.8)	9.0 (23)	49.2 (125)
Average precipitation days (≥ 0.01 in)	11.8	10.6	11.6	11.6	11.8	10.9	9.4	9.0	9.0	10.5	10.3	11.9	128.4
Average snowy days (≥ 0.1 in)	6.6	6.2	4.4	0.8	0.0	0.0	0.0	0.0	0.0	0.2	0.6	4.2	23.0
Average relative humidity (%)	62.3	62.0	63.1	63.0	66.7	68.5	68.4	70.8	71.8	68.5	67.5	65.4	66.5
Average dew point °F (°C)	19.8 (−6.8)	20.3 (−6.5)	26.2 (−3.2)	35.1 (1.7)	46.2 (7.9)	56.3 (13.5)	62.1 (16.7)	61.7 (16.5)	55.9 (13.3)	45.0 (7.2)	34.5 (1.4)	25.9 (−3.4)	40.8 (4.9)
Mean monthly sunshine hours	163.4	168.4	213.7	227.2	267.3	286.5	300.9	277.3	237.1	206.3	143.2	142.3	2,633.6
Percentage possible sunshine	56	57	58	57	59	63	65	64	63	60	49	50	59
Average ultraviolet index	1	2	4	5	7	8	8	8	6	4	2	1	5
Source 1: NOAA (relative humidity, and sun 1961−1990)
Source 2: Weather Atlas (UV)

Climate data for Boston, Massachusetts
Month	Jan	Feb	Mar	Apr	May	Jun	Jul	Aug	Sep	Oct	Nov	Dec	Year
Average sea temperature °F (°C)	41.3 (5.2)	38.1 (3.4)	38.4 (3.5)	43.1 (6.2)	49.2 (9.5)	58.4 (14.7)	65.7 (18.7)	67.9 (20.0)	64.8 (18.2)	59.4 (15.3)	52.3 (11.3)	46.6 (8.2)	52.1 (11.2)
Source: Weather Atlas

== Demographics ==
Historical population
Year	Pop.	±%
1680	4,500	—
1690	7,000	+55.6%
1700	6,700	−4.3%
1710	9,000	+34.3%
1722	10,567	+17.4%
1742	16,382	+55.0%
1765	15,520	−5.3%
1790	18,320	+18.0%
1800	24,937	+36.1%
1810	33,787	+35.5%
1820	43,298	+28.1%
1830	61,392	+41.8%
1840	93,383	+52.1%
1850	136,881	+46.6%
1860	177,840	+29.9%
1870	250,526	+40.9%
1880	362,839	+44.8%
1890	448,477	+23.6%
1900	560,892	+25.1%
1910	670,585	+19.6%
1920	748,060	+11.6%
1930	781,188	+4.4%
1940	770,816	−1.3%
1950	801,444	+4.0%
1960	697,197	−13.0%
1970	641,071	−8.1%
1980	562,994	−12.2%
1990	574,283	+2.0%
2000	589,141	+2.6%
2010	617,594	+4.8%
2020	675,647	+9.4%
2025*	672,973	−0.4%
*=population estimate. Source: United States census records and Population Estimates Program data. 2010–2020; Source: U.S. Decennial Census

Historical racial/ethnic composition
Race/ethnicity	2020	2010	1990	1970	1940
Non-Hispanic White	44.7%	47.0%	59.0%	79.5% (Note: From 15% sample)	96.6%
Black	22.0%	24.4%	23.8%	16.3%	3.1%
Hispanic or Latino (of any race)	19.5%	17.5%	10.8%	2.8%	0.1%
Asian	9.7%	8.9%	5.3%	1.3%	0.2%
Two or more races	3.2%	3.9%	–	–	–
Native American	0.2%	0.4%	0.3%	0.2%	–

Boston city, Massachusetts – Racial and ethnic composition Note: the US Census treats Hispanic/Latino as an ethnic category. This table excludes Latinos from the racial categories and assigns them to a separate category. Hispanics/Latinos may be of any race.
Race / Ethnicity (NH = Non-Hispanic)	Pop 1970	Pop 1980	Pop 1990	Pop 2000	Pop 2010	Pop 2020	% 1970	% 1980	% 1990	% 2000	% 2010	% 2020
White alone (NH)	524,709	382,123	338,734	291,561	290,312	301,464	81.85%	67.87%	58.98%	49.49%	47.01%	44.62%
Black or African American alone (NH)	104,707	122,203	136,887	140,305	138,073	129,264	16.33%	21.71%	23.84%	23.82%	22.36%	19.13%
Native American or Alaska Native alone (NH)	1,047	1,302	1,531	1,517	1,227	989	0.16%	0.23%	0.27%	0.26%	0.20%	0.15%
Asian alone (NH)	8,218	15,150	29,640	44,009	54,846	75,588	1.28%	2.69%	5.16%	7.47%	8.88%	11.19%
Native Hawaiian or Pacific Islander alone (NH)	x	x	x	271	182	251	x	x	x	0.05%	0.03%	0.04%
Other race alone (NH)	2,390	6,148	5,536	8,215	10,078	9,257	0.37%	1.09%	0.96%	1.39%	1.63%	1.37%
Mixed race or Multiracial (NH)	x	x	x	18,174	14,959	32,721	x	x	x	3.08%	2.42%	4.84%
Hispanic or Latino (any race)	x	36,068	61,955	85,089	107,917	126,113	x	6.41%	10.79%	14.44%	17.47%	18.67%
Total	641,071	562,994	574,283	589,141	617,594	675,647	100.00%	100.00%	100.00%	100.00%	100.00%	100.00%

In the 2020 census, Boston was estimated to have 691,531 residents living in 266,724 households—a 12% population increase over 2010. Boston is the third-most densely populated large U.S. city of over half a million residents, and the most densely populated state capital. Some 1.2 million persons may be within Boston's boundaries during work hours, and as many as 2 million during special events. This fluctuation of people is caused by hundreds of thousands of suburban residents who travel to the city for work, education, health care, and special events.

In 2011, 21.9% of the population was aged 19 and under, 14.3% was from 20 to 24, 33.2% from 25 to 44, 20.4% from 45 to 64, and 10.1% was 65 years of age or older. The median age was 30.8 years. For every 100 females, there were 92.0 males. For every 100 females age 18 and over, there were 89.9 males. There were 252,699 households, of which 20.4% had children under the age of 18 living in them, 25.5% were married couples living together, 16.3% had a female householder with no husband present, and 54.0% were non-families. 37.1% of all households were made up of individuals, and 9.0% had someone living alone who was 65 years of age or older. The average household size was 2.26, and the average family size was 3.08.

In 2024, the median household income in Boston was $97,791, while the median income for a family was $110,710. In 2011, full-time year-round male workers had a median income of $52,544 versus $46,540 for full-time year-round female workers. The per capita income for the city was $33,158. 21.4% of the population and 16.0% of families were below the poverty line. Of the total population, 28.8% of those under the age of 18 and 20.4% of those 65 and older were living below the poverty line. Boston has a significant racial wealth gap with White Bostonians having a median net worth of $247,500 compared to an $8 median net worth for non-immigrant Black residents and $0 for Dominican immigrant residents.

From the 1950s to the end of the 20th century, the proportion of non-Hispanic Whites in Boston declined. In 2000, non-Hispanic Whites were 49.5% of Boston's population, making the city majority minority for the first time. In the 21st century, Boston has experienced significant gentrification, during which affluent Whites have moved into formerly non-White areas. In 2006, the U.S. Census Bureau estimated non-Hispanic Whites again formed a slight majority. By 2010, in part due to a crash in housing prices, as well as increased efforts to make affordable housing more available, the non-White population had rebounded and non-Hispanic White residents formed 47% of the population.

=== Ethnicity ===
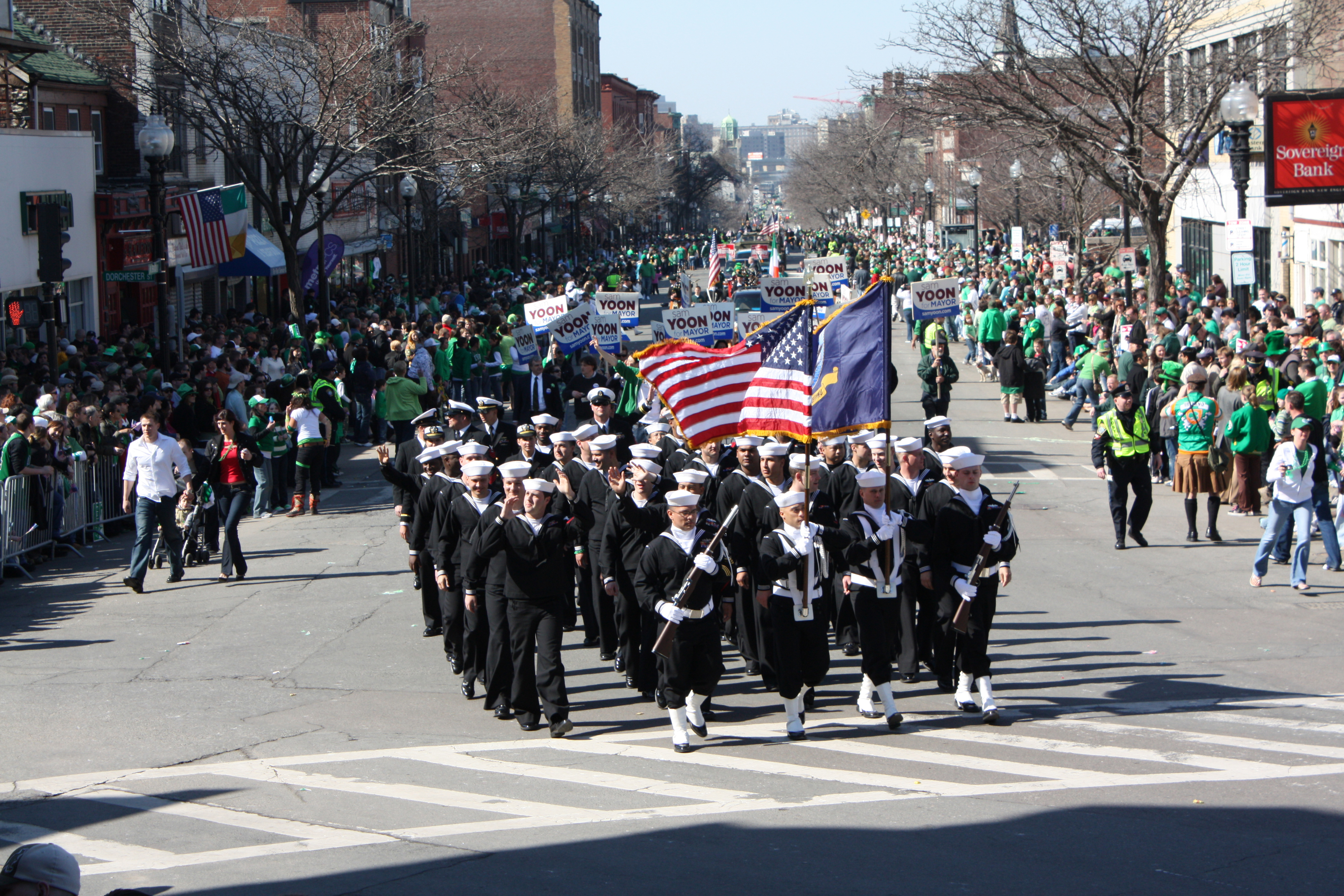
U.S. Navy sailors march in Boston's annual Saint Patrick's Day parade. Irish Americans constitute the largest ethnicity in Boston.

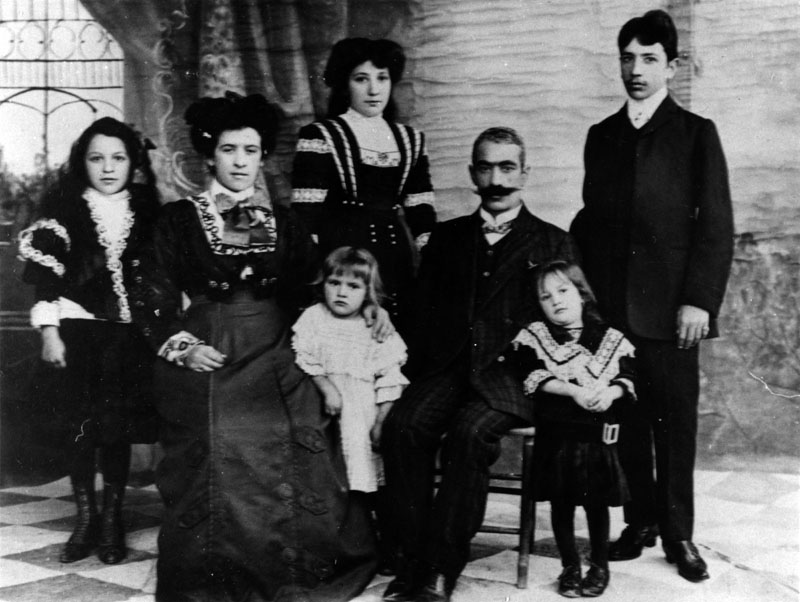
An Armenian American family in Boston, 1908

In 2011, African-Americans comprised 22% of the city's population. People of Irish descent formed the second-largest single ethnic group in the city, making up 15.8% of the population, followed by Italians, accounting for 8.3% of the population. People of West Indian and Caribbean ancestry are another sizable group, collectively at over 15%.

In Greater Boston, these numbers grew significantly, with 150,000 Dominicans according to 2018 estimates, 134,000 Puerto Ricans, 57,500 Salvadorans, 39,000 Guatemalans, 36,000 Mexicans, and over 35,000 Colombians. East Boston has a diverse Hispanic/Latino population of Salvadorans, Colombians, Guatemalans, Mexicans, Dominicans and Puerto Ricans. Hispanic populations in southwest Boston neighborhoods are mainly made up of Dominicans and Puerto Ricans, usually sharing neighborhoods in this section with African Americans and Blacks with origins from the Caribbean and Africa, especially Cape Verdeans and Haitians. Neighborhoods such as Jamaica Plain and Roslindale have a growing number of Dominican Americans.

There is a large and historical Armenian community in Boston, and the city is home to the Armenian Heritage Park. Over 27,000 Chinese Americans made their home in Boston city proper in 2013. According to the 2012–2016 American Community Survey 5-Year Estimates, the largest ancestry groups in Boston are:

Ancestry	Percentage of Boston population	Percentage of Massachusetts population	Percentage of United States population	City-to-state difference	City-to-USA difference
Black	22%	8.2%	14–15%	13.8%	7%
Irish	14.06%	21.16%	10.39%	−7.10%	3.67%
Italian	8.13%	13.19%	5.39%	−5.05%	2.74%
Other West Indian	6.92%	1.96%	0.90%	4.97%	6.02%
Dominican	5.45%	2.60%	0.68%	2.65%	4.57%
Puerto Rican	5.27%	4.52%	1.66%	0.75%	3.61%
Chinese	4.57%	2.28%	1.24%	2.29%	3.33%
German	4.57%	6.00%	14.40%	−1.43%	−9.83%
English	4.54%	9.77%	7.67%	−5.23%	−3.13%
American	4.13%	4.26%	6.89%	−0.13%	−2.76%
Sub-Saharan African	4.09%	2.00%	1.01%	2.09%	3.08%
Haitian	3.58%	1.15%	0.31%	2.43%	3.27%
Polish	2.48%	4.67%	2.93%	−2.19%	−0.45%
Cape Verdean	2.21%	0.97%	0.03%	1.24%	2.18%
French	1.93%	6.82%	2.56%	−4.89%	−0.63%
Vietnamese	1.76%	0.69%	0.54%	1.07%	1.22%
Jamaican	1.70%	0.44%	0.34%	1.26%	1.36%
Russian	1.62%	1.65%	0.88%	−0.03%	0.74%
Asian Indian	1.31%	1.39%	1.09%	−0.08%	0.22%
Scottish	1.30%	2.28%	1.71%	−0.98%	−0.41%
French Canadian	1.19%	3.91%	0.65%	−2.71%	0.54%
Mexican	1.12%	0.67%	11.96%	0.45%	−10.84%
Arab	1.10%	1.10%	0.59%	0.00%	0.50%

=== Income ===
Data is from the American Community Survey's five-year estimates 2008–2012.

Rank	ZIP Code (ZCTA)	Per capita income	Median household income	Median family income	Population	Number of households
1	02110 (Financial District)	$152,007	$123,795	$196,518	1,486	981
2	02199 (Prudential Center)	$151,060	$107,159	$146,786	1,290	823
3	02210 (Fort Point)	$93,078	$111,061	$223,411	1,905	1,088
4	02109 (North End)	$88,921	$128,022	$162,045	4,277	2,190
5	02116 (Back Bay/Bay Village)	$81,458	$87,630	$134,875	21,318	10,938
6	02108 (Beacon Hill/Financial District)	$78,569	$95,753	$153,618	4,155	2,337
7	02114 (Beacon Hill/West End)	$65,865	$79,734	$169,107	11,933	6,752
8	02111 (Chinatown/Financial District/Leather District)	$56,716	$44,758	$88,333	7,616	3,390
9	02129 (Charlestown)	$56,267	$89,105	$98,445	17,052	8,083
10	02467 (Chestnut Hill)	$53,382	$113,952	$148,396	22,796	6,351
11	02113 (North End)	$52,905	$64,413	$112,589	7,276	4,329
12	02132 (West Roxbury)	$44,306	$82,421	$110,219	27,163	11,013
13	02118 (South End)	$43,887	$50,000	$49,090	26,779	12,512
14	02130 (Jamaica Plain)	$42,916	$74,198	$95,426	36,866	15,306
15	02127 (South Boston)	$42,854	$67,012	$68,110	32,547	14,994
	Massachusetts	$35,485	$66,658	$84,380	6,560,595	2,525,694
	Boston	$33,589	$53,136	$63,230	619,662	248,704
	Suffolk County	$32,429	$52,700	$61,796	724,502	287,442
16	02135 (Brighton)	$31,773	$50,291	$62,602	38,839	18,336
17	02131 (Roslindale)	$29,486	$61,099	$70,598	30,370	11,282
	United States	$28,051	$53,046	$64,585	309,138,711	115,226,802
18	02136 (Hyde Park)	$28,009	$57,080	$74,734	29,219	10,650
19	02134 (Allston)	$25,319	$37,638	$49,355	20,478	8,916
20	02128 (East Boston)	$23,450	$49,549	$49,470	41,680	14,965
21	02122 (Dorchester-Fields Corner)	$23,432	$51,798	$50,246	25,437	8,216
22	02124 (Dorchester-Codman Square-Ashmont)	$23,115	$48,329	$55,031	49,867	17,275
23	02125 (Dorchester-Uphams Corner-Savin Hill)	$22,158	$42,298	$44,397	31,996	11,481
24	02163 (Allston-Harvard Business School)	$21,915	$43,889	$91,190	1,842	562
25	02115 (Back Bay, Longwood, Museum of Fine Arts/Symphony Hall area)	$21,654	$23,677	$50,303	29,178	9,958
26	02126 (Mattapan)	$20,649	$43,532	$52,774	27,335	9,510
27	02215 (Fenway-Kenmore)	$19,082	$30,823	$72,583	23,719	7,995
28	02119 (Roxbury)	$18,998	$27,051	$35,311	24,237	9,769
29	02121 (Dorchester-Mount Bowdoin)	$18,226	$30,419	$35,439	26,801	9,739
30	02120 (Mission Hill)	$17,390	$32,367	$29,583	13,217	4,509

=== Religion ===
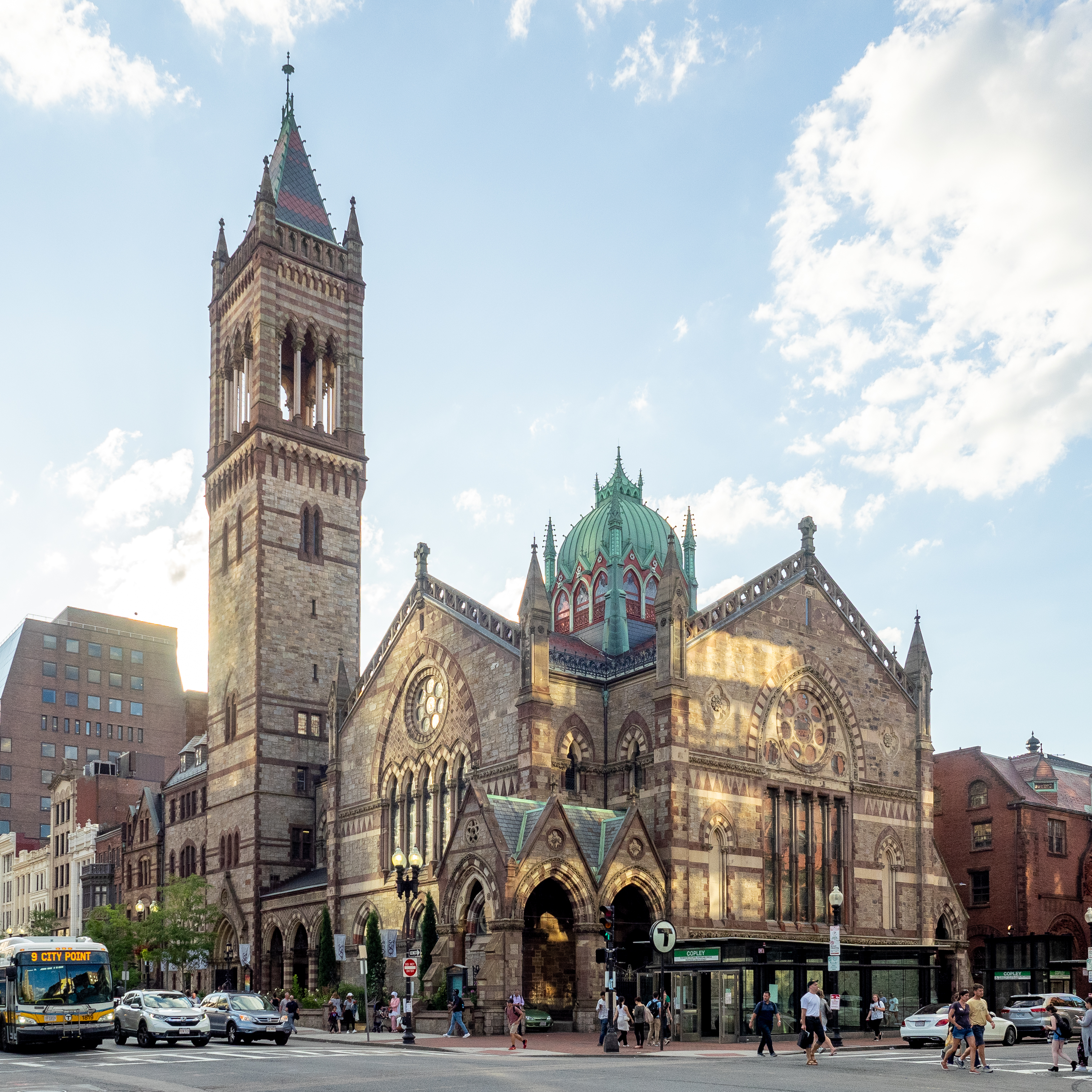
Old South Church, a United Church of Christ congregation first organized in 1669, at Copley Square

In a 2023-24 study by the Pew Research Center, 47% of the population of the city identified themselves as Christians, with 21% attending a variety of Protestant churches and 24% professing Roman Catholic beliefs. 40% claim no religious affiliation. The remaining 13% are composed of adherents of Judaism, Buddhism, Islam, Hinduism, and other faiths.

In 2010, the Catholic Church had the highest number of adherents as a single denomination in the Greater Boston area, with more than two million members and 339 churches, followed by the Episcopal Church with 58,000 adherents in 160 churches. The United Church of Christ had 55,000 members and 213 churches.

In 2015, the Boston metro area had a Jewish population of approximately 248,000. More than half the Jewish households in the Greater Boston area reside in the city itself, Brookline, Newton, Cambridge, Somerville, or adjacent towns. A small minority practices Confucianism, and some practice Boston Confucianism, an American evolution of Confucianism adapted for Boston intellectuals.

== Economy ==
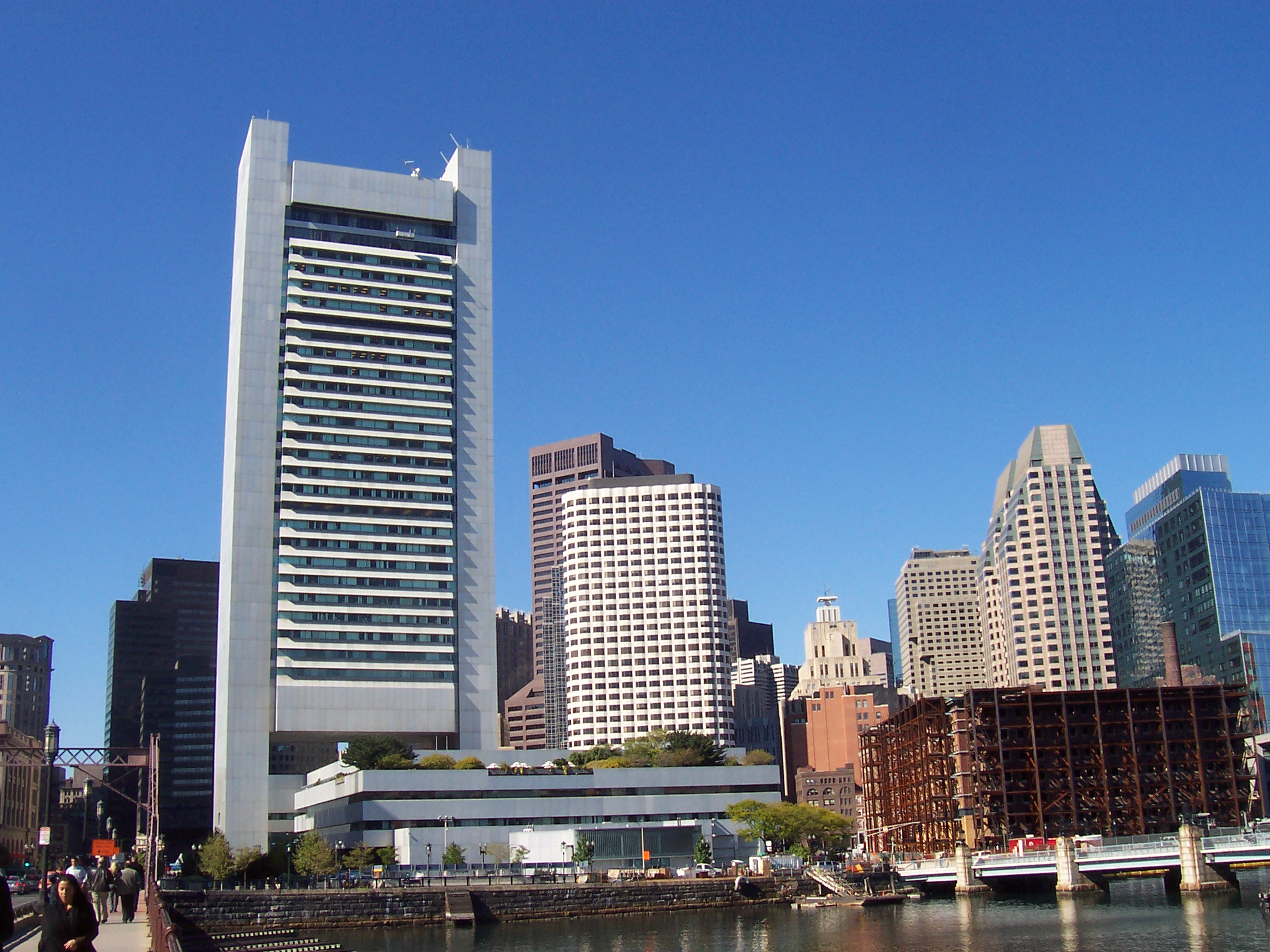
The Federal Reserve Bank of Boston at 600 Atlantic Avenue

Top publicly traded Boston companies for 2018 (ranked by revenues) with City and U.S. ranks
Bos.	Corporation	US	Revenue (in millions)
1	General Electric	18	$122,274
2	Liberty Mutual	68	$42,687
3	State Street	259	$11,774
4	American Tower	419	$6,663.9

Top city employers, 2023.
Rank	Company/Organization
1	Brigham and Women's Hospital
2	Dana Farber Cancer Institute
3	Massachusetts General Hospital
4	Beth Israel Deaconess Medical Center
5	Boston Children's Hospital
6	Boston Medical Center
7	Boston University School of Medicine
8	Massachusetts Bay Transportation Authority
9	TIAA
10	Tufts Children's Hospital

A global city, Boston is ranked among the top 30 most economically powerful cities in the world. Encompassing $610 billion, the Greater Boston metropolitan area has the eighth-largest economy in the country and 16th-largest in the world.

Boston's colleges and universities exert a significant impact on the regional economy. Boston attracts more than 350,000 college students from around the world, who contribute more than US$4.8 billion annually to the city's economy. The area's schools are major employers and attract industries to the city and surrounding region. The city is home to a number of technology companies. It is a hub for biotechnology, with the Milken Institute rating Boston as the top life sciences cluster in the country. Boston receives the highest absolute amount of annual funding from the National Institutes of Health of all cities in the United States.

Boston is considered highly innovative for a variety of reasons, including the presence of academia, access to venture capital, and the presence of many high-tech companies. The Route 128 corridor and Greater Boston continue to be a major center for venture capital investment, and high technology remains an important sector with nearly 5,000 startup companies. In the late 2010s to the 2020s, the city has been a center of artificial intelligence.

Tourism composes a large part of Boston's economy, with 21.2 million domestic and international visitors spending $8.3 billion in 2011. Excluding visitors from Canada and Mexico, over 1.4 million international tourists visited Boston in 2014, with those from China and the United Kingdom leading the list. Boston's status as a state capital as well as the regional home of federal agencies has rendered law and government to be another major component of the city's economy. Boston is a major seaport along the East Coast of the United States and the oldest continuously operated industrial and fishing port in the Western Hemisphere.

In the 2018 Global Financial Centres Index, Boston was ranked as having the 13th-most competitive financial services center in the world and the second-most competitive in the United States. Boston-based Fidelity Investments helped popularize the mutual fund in the 1980s and has made Boston one of the top financial centers in the United States and a center for venture capital firms. Boston is home to the headquarters of Santander Bank and State Street Corporation, the latter specializing in asset management and custody services. Boston is a printing and publishing center—Houghton Mifflin Harcourt is headquartered within the city, along with Bedford-St. Martin's Press and Beacon Press. Pearson PLC publishing units employ several hundred people in Boston.

Boston is home to two convention centers—the Hynes Convention Center in the Back Bay and the Boston Convention and Exhibition Center on the South Boston waterfront. Boston is home to the headquarters of several major athletic and footwear companies, including Converse, New Balance, and Reebok. Rockport, Puma and Wolverine World Wide, Inc. headquarters or regional offices are just outside the city.

== Education ==
=== Primary and secondary ===
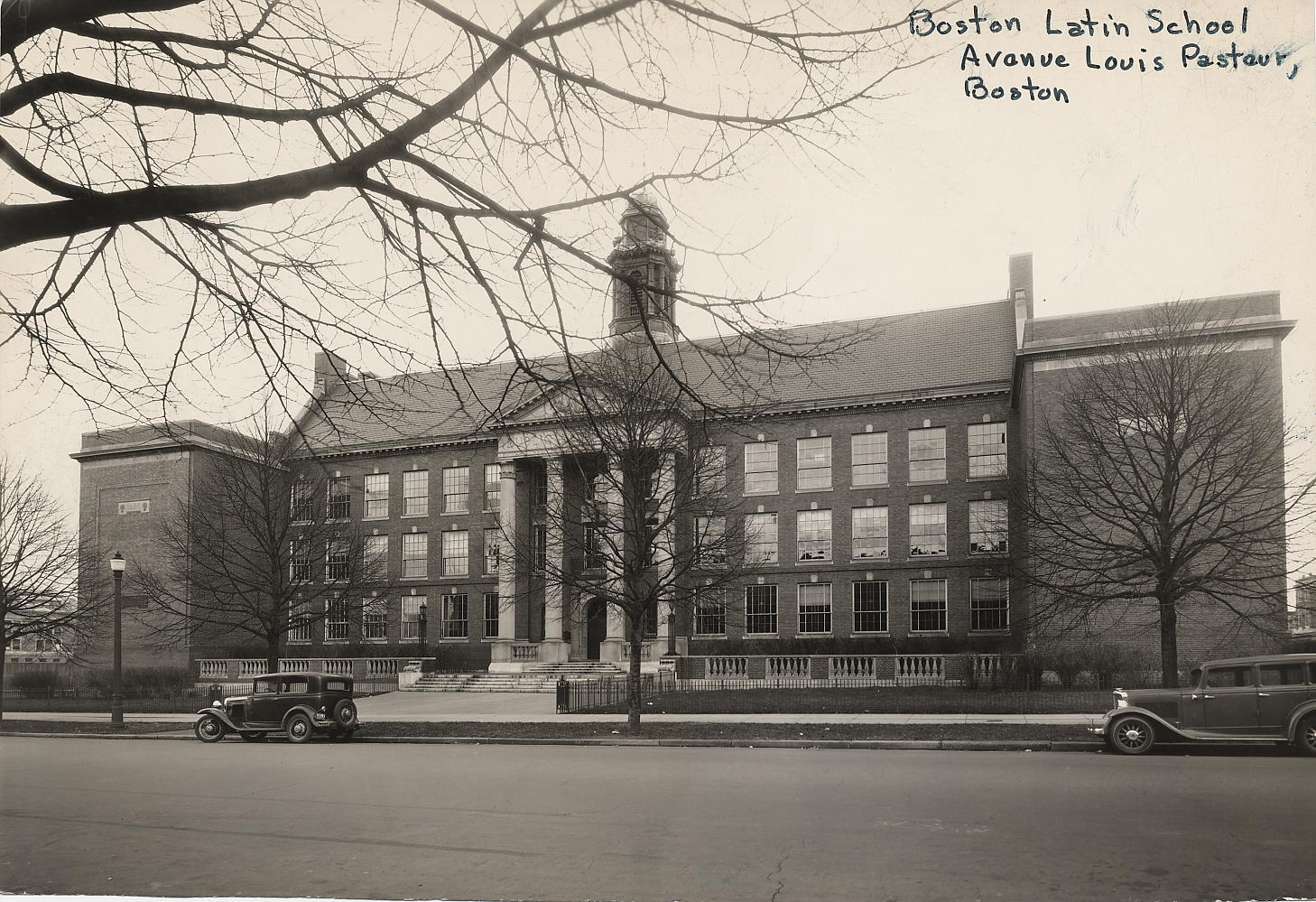
Boston Latin School, established in 1635, is the oldest public high school in the U.S.

Boston Public Schools enroll 57,000 students attending 145 schools, including Boston Latin Academy, John D. O'Bryant School of Math & Science, and the Boston Latin School. The Boston Latin School was established in 1635 and is the oldest public high school in the US. Boston also operates the United States' second-oldest public high school and its oldest public elementary school. The system's students are 40% Hispanic or Latino, 35% Black or African American, 13% White, and 9% Asian.

There are private, parochial, and charter schools. Approximately 3,300 minority students attend participating suburban schools through the Metropolitan Educational Opportunity Council. In September 2019, the city began Boston Saves. This program provides every child enrolled in the city's kindergarten system a savings account, containing $50 to be used toward college or career training.

=== Colleges and universities ===
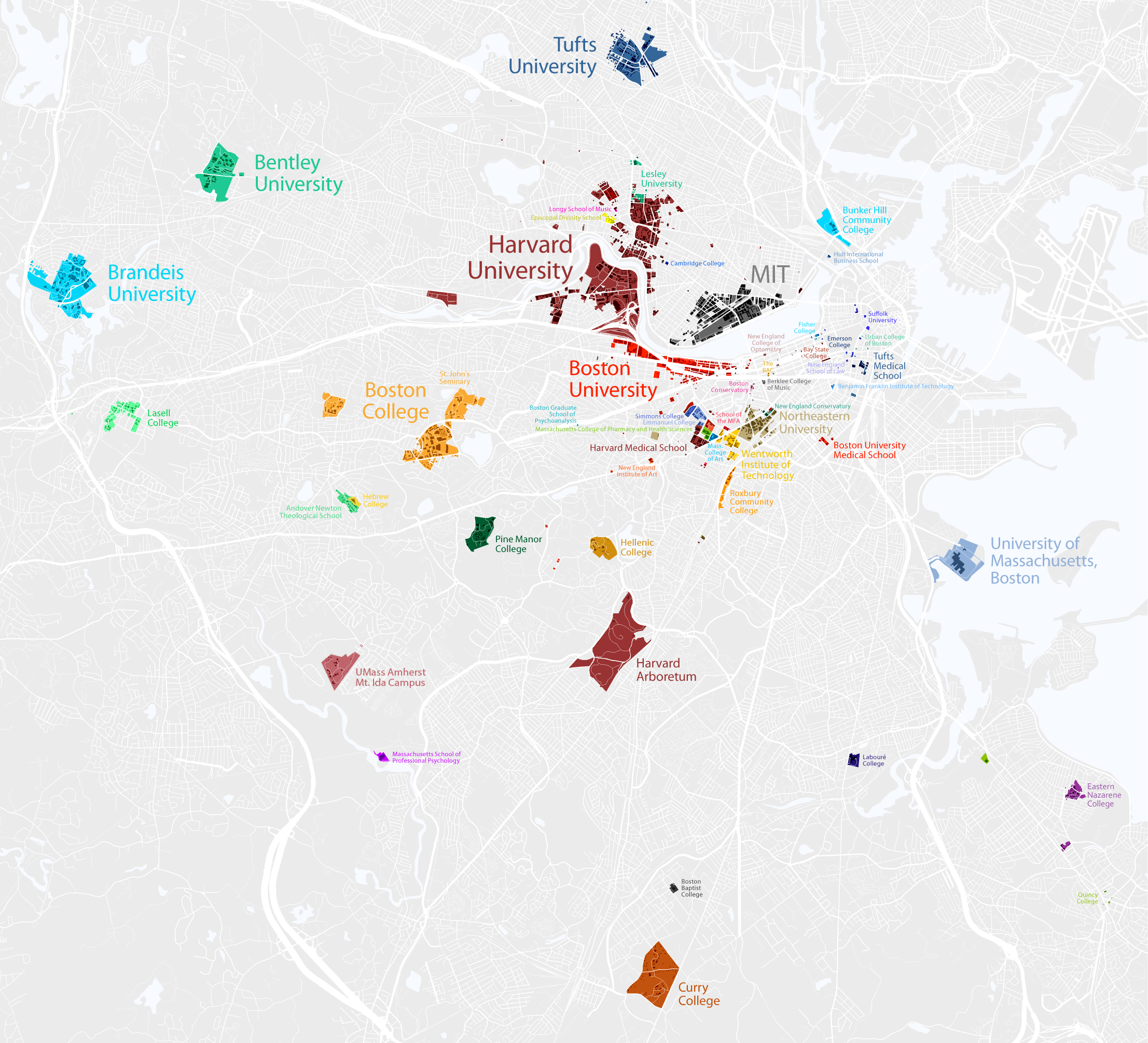
A map of Boston-area universities

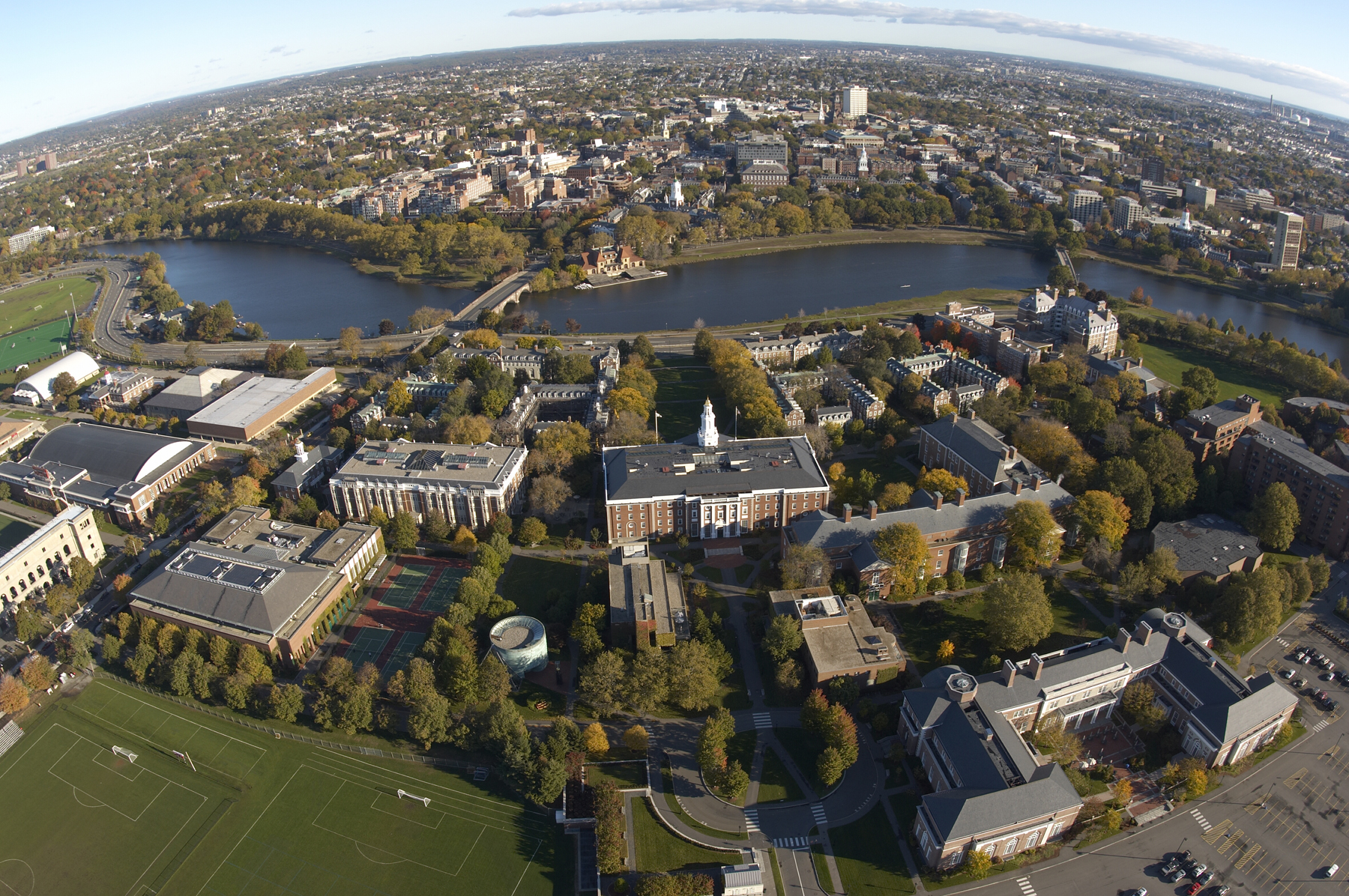
Harvard Business School, one of the nation's top business schools.

Several of the highest-ranked universities in the world are near Boston. Three universities with a major presence in the city, Harvard, MIT, and Tufts, are just outside of Boston in the cities of Cambridge and Somerville, known as the Brainpower Triangle. Harvard is the nation's oldest institute of higher education and is centered across the Charles River in Cambridge, though the majority of its land holdings and a substantial amount of its educational activities are in Boston. Its business school and athletics facilities are in Boston's Allston neighborhood, and its medical, dental, and public health schools are located in the Longwood area. The Massachusetts Institute of Technology (MIT) originated in Boston and was long known as "Boston Tech"; it moved across the river to Cambridge in 1916. Tufts University's main campus is north of the city in Somerville and Medford, though its medical and dental schools are located in Boston's Chinatown at Tufts Medical Center.

Greater Boston has more than 50 colleges and universities, with 250,000 students enrolled in Boston and Cambridge alone. The city's largest private universities include Boston University (also the city's fourth-largest employer), with its main campus along Commonwealth Avenue and a medical campus in the South End, Northeastern University in the Fenway area, Suffolk University near Beacon Hill, which includes law school and business school, and Boston College, which straddles the Boston (Brighton)–Newton border. Boston's only public university is the University of Massachusetts Boston on Columbia Point in Dorchester. Roxbury Community College and Bunker Hill Community College are the city's two public community colleges. Altogether, Boston's colleges and universities employ more than 42,600 people, accounting for nearly seven percent of the city's workforce.

Five members of the Association of American Universities are in Greater Boston, more than any other metropolitan area: Harvard University, the Massachusetts Institute of Technology, Tufts University, Boston University, and Brandeis University. Greater Boston contains seven Highest Research Activity (R1) Universities as per the Carnegie Classification. This includes, in addition to the aforementioned five, Boston College and Northeastern University. This is, by a large margin, the highest concentration of such institutions in a single metropolitan area. Hospitals, universities, and research institutions in Greater Boston received more than $1.77 billion in National Institutes of Health grants in 2013, more money than any other American metropolitan area. This high density of research institutes also contributes to Boston's high density of early-career researchers, who, due to high housing costs in the region, have been shown to face housing stress.

Smaller private colleges include Babson College, Bentley University, Boston Architectural College, Emmanuel College, Fisher College, MGH Institute of Health Professions, Massachusetts College of Pharmacy and Health Sciences, Simmons University, Wellesley College, Wentworth Institute of Technology, New England School of Law (originally established as America's first all female law school), and Emerson College. The region is home to several conservatories and art schools, including the New England Conservatory (the oldest independent conservatory in the United States), the Boston Conservatory, and Berklee College of Music, which has made Boston an important city for jazz music. Many trade schools also exist in the city such as the Boston Career Institute, the North Bennet Street School, and Greater Boston Joint Apprentice Training Center.

== Government ==
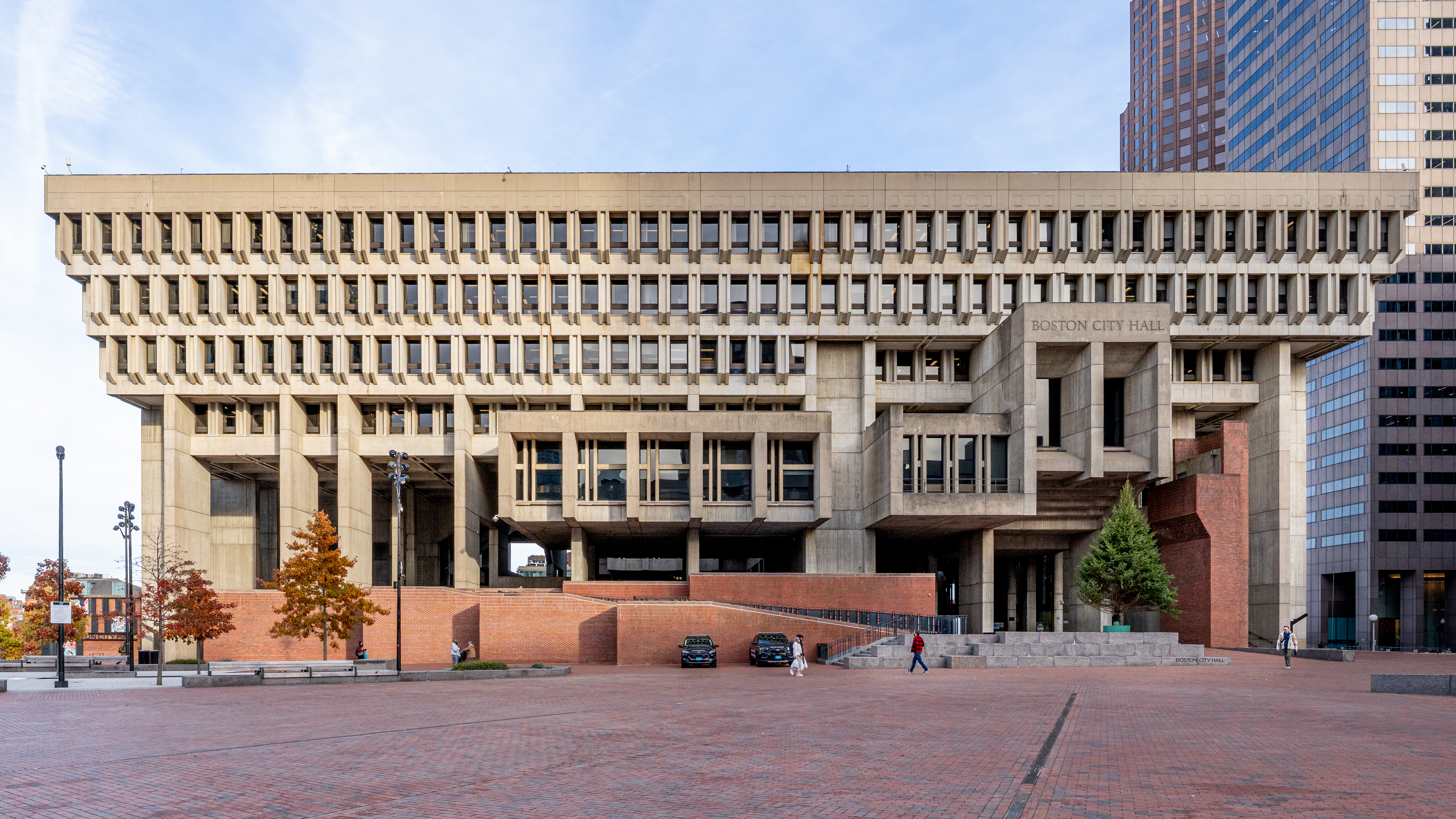
Boston City Hall is a Brutalist-style landmark in the city.

Boston has a strong mayor–council government system in which the mayor, elected every fourth year, has extensive executive power. Michelle Wu became mayor in November 2021, succeeding Kim Janey who became the Acting Mayor in March 2021 following Marty Walsh's confirmation to the position of Secretary of Labor in the Biden/Harris Administration. Walsh's predecessor Thomas Menino's twenty-year tenure was the longest in Boston's history.

The Boston City Council is elected every two years. There are nine district seats, and four citywide "at-large" seats. The School Committee, which oversees the Boston Public Schools, is appointed by the mayor. Boston uses an algorithm called CityScore to measure the effectiveness of city services. This score is available on a public online dashboard. It allows city managers in police, fire, schools, emergency management services, and 3-1-1 to take action and make adjustments in areas of concern.

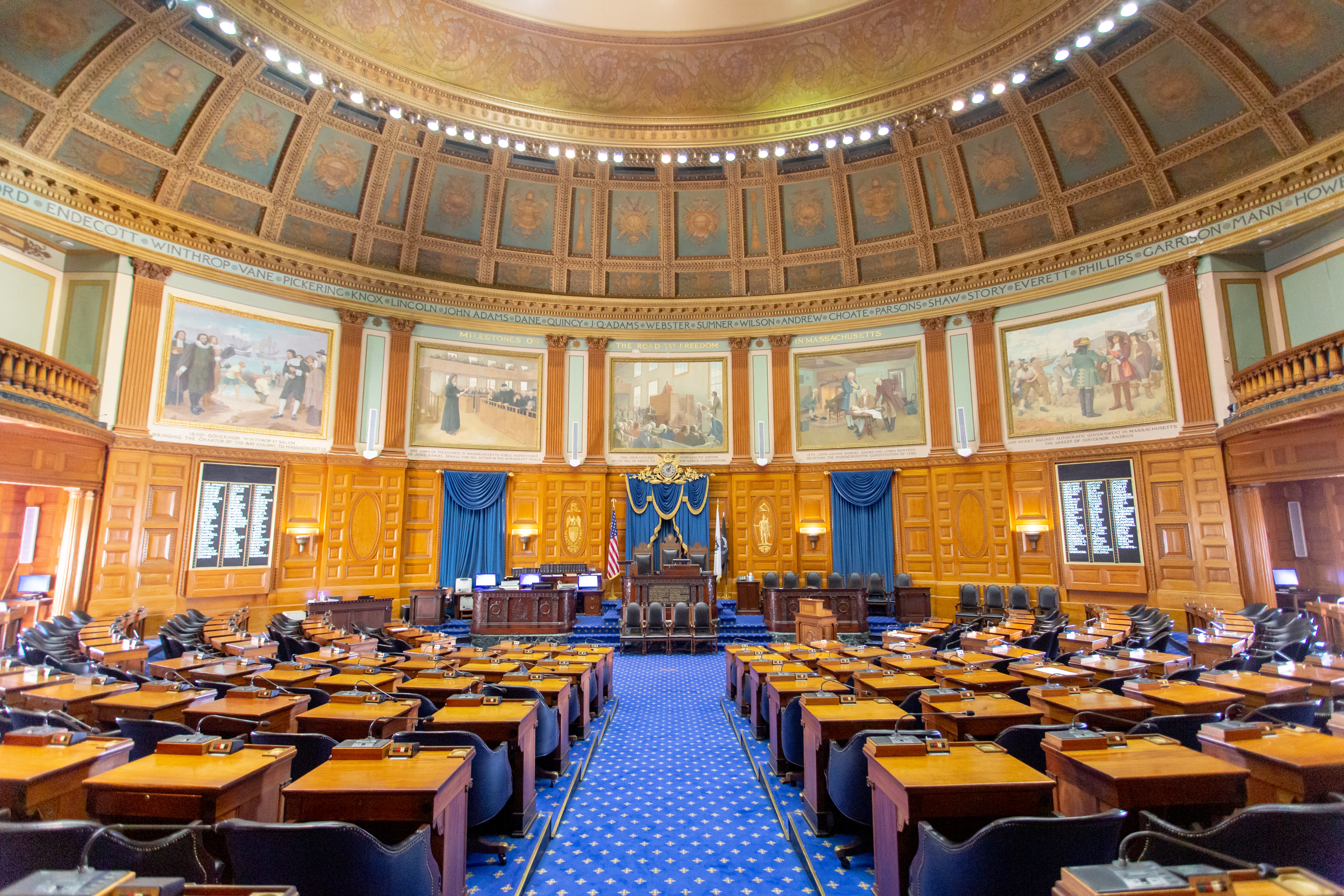
The chamber of the Massachusetts House of Representatives in Massachusetts State House

In addition to city government, numerous commissions and state authorities, including the Massachusetts Department of Conservation and Recreation, the Boston Public Health Commission, the Massachusetts Water Resources Authority (MWRA), and the Massachusetts Port Authority (Massport), play a role in the life of Bostonians. As the capital of Massachusetts, Boston plays a major role in state politics. (Note: Since the Massachusetts State House is located in the city's Beacon Hill neighborhood, the term "Beacon Hill" is used as a metonym for the Massachusetts state government.)

Boston has several federal facilities, including the John F. Kennedy Federal Office Building, the Thomas P. O'Neill Jr. Federal Building, the John W. McCormack Post Office and Courthouse, and the Federal Reserve Bank of Boston. The United States Court of Appeals for the First Circuit and the United States District Court for the District of Massachusetts are housed in The John Joseph Moakley United States Courthouse.

Federally, Boston is split between two congressional districts. Three-fourths of Boston is in the 7th district and is represented by Ayanna Pressley. The remaining southern fourth is in the 8th district. It is represented by Stephen Lynch. Both are Democrats; a Republican has not represented a significant portion of Boston in over a century. The state's senior member of the United States Senate is Democrat Elizabeth Warren, first elected in 2012. The state's junior member of the United States Senate is Democrat Ed Markey, who was elected in 2013 to succeed John Kerry after Kerry's appointment and confirmation as the United States Secretary of State.

Voter registration and party enrollment as of October 26, 2024 – Boston
Party	Number of voters	Percentage
Democratic	174,046	39.69%
Republican	18,673	4.26%
Unenrolled	241,970	55.18%
Political Designations	1,140	0.26%
Total	438,498	100%

Presidential election results
Year	Democratic	Republican
2024	76.7% 201,628	19.7% 51,808
2020	82.6% 242,717	15.5% 45,425
2016	80.6% 221,093	13.9% 38,087
2012	78.8% 200,190	19.3% 48,985
2008	78.9% 185,976	19.3% 45,548
2004	77.3% 160,884	21.4% 44,518
2000	71.7% 132,393	19.7% 36,389
1996	73.8% 125,529	19.6% 33,366
1992	62.4% 114,260	22.9% 41,868
1988	65.2% 122,349	33.2% 62,202
1984	63.4% 131,745	36.2% 75,311
1980	53.3% 95,133	32.9% 58,656
1976	59.0% 115,802	34.4% 67,604
1972	64.3% 139,598	32.4% 70,298
1968	73.7% 171,250	17.9% 41,562
1964	83.5% 220,007	13.1% 34,583
1960	73.4% 218,422	24.9% 74,086
1956	52.3% 165,530	45.2% 143,194
1952	58.3% 211,944	39.5% 143,400
1948	67.1% 235,493	26.8% 94,163

== Public safety ==
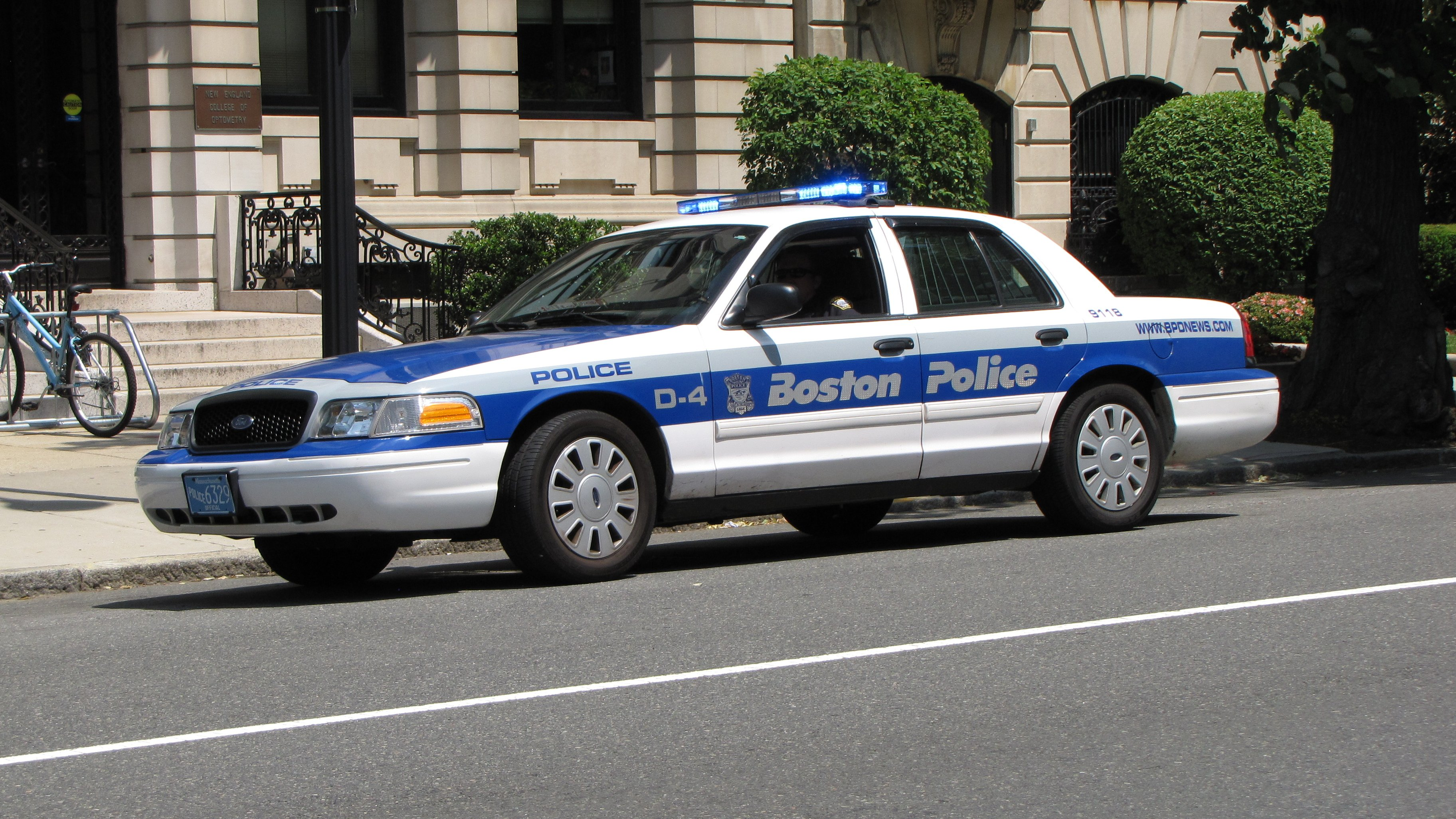
A Boston Police cruiser on Beacon Street

Boston included $414 million in spending on the Boston Police Department in the fiscal 2021 budget. This is the second largest allocation of funding by the city after the allocation to Boston Public Schools.

Like many major American cities, Boston has experienced a great reduction in violent crime since the early 1990s. Boston's low crime rate since the 1990s has been credited to the Boston Police Department's collaboration with neighborhood groups and church parishes to prevent youths from joining gangs, as well as involvement from the United States Attorney and District Attorney's offices. This helped lead in part to what has been touted as the "Boston Miracle". Murders in Boston dropped from 152 in 1990, a murder rate of 26.5 per 100,000 people, to 31—not one of them a juvenile—in 1999, for a murder rate of 5.26 per 100,000.

According to the Uniform Crime Reporting (UCR) program in 2022, Boston had 3,955 reported violent crimes, which include homicide, rape, robbery, and aggravated assault, and 11,514 reported property crimes, which include arson, burglary, larceny-theft, and motor vehicle theft. With a violent crime rate of 608.7 per 100,000 people, the city's violent crime rate is higher than Massachusetts' rate of 322 per 100,000 people and the national rate of 380.7 per 100,000 people. While Boston's property crime rate, at 1,772.0 per 100,000 people, is higher than Massachusetts' property crime rate of 1,070.1 per 100,000 people, it is lower than the national property crime rate of 1,954.4 per 100,000 people. (Note: The crime rate per 100,000 is based on the 2022 population of 649,768 in relation to the number of reported crimes in 2022.)

The city has a municipal animal shelter, located in Roslindale and operated by Boston Animal Care and Control.

== Culture ==
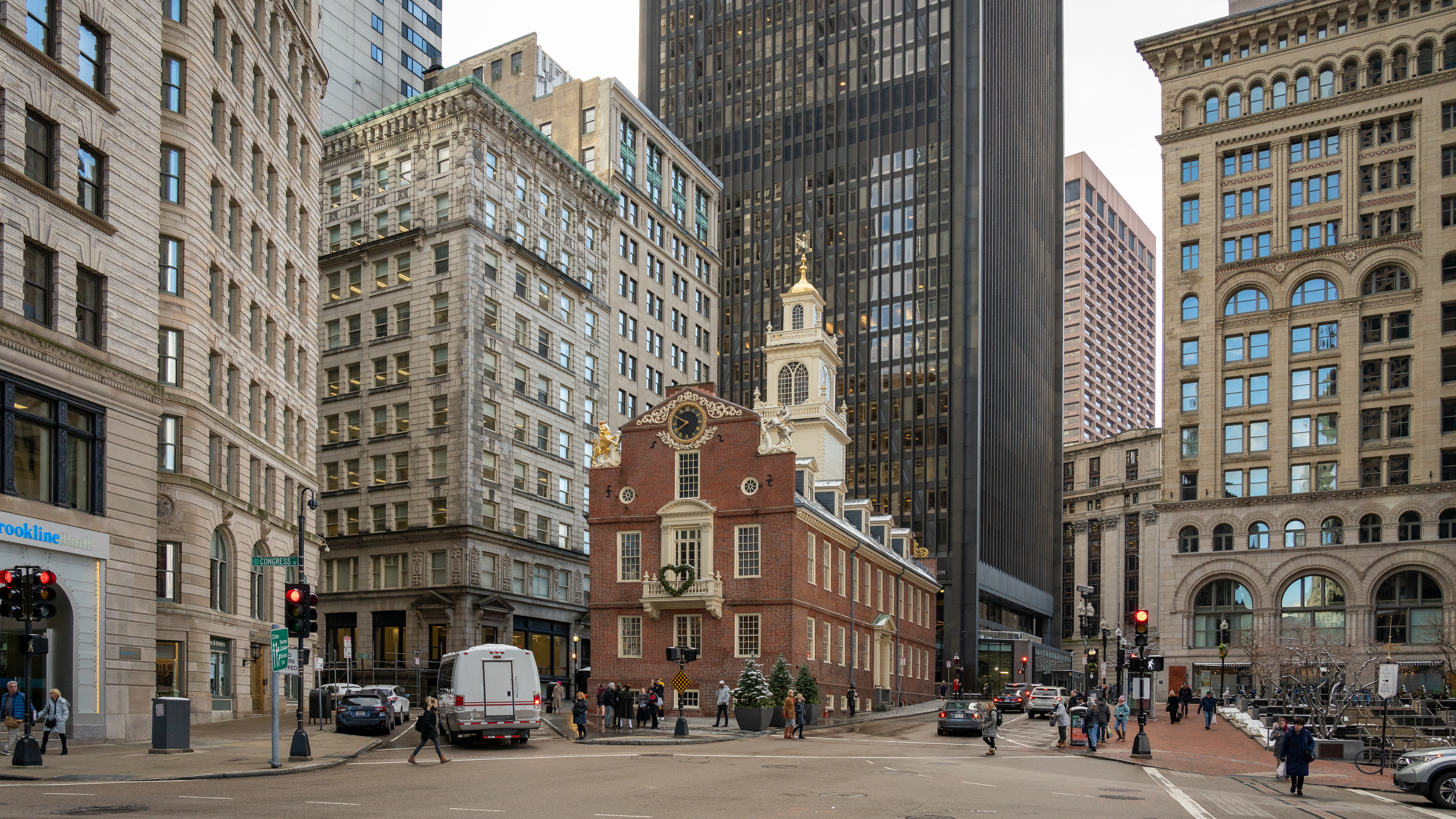
Old State House, a museum on the Freedom Trail near the site of the Boston Massacre

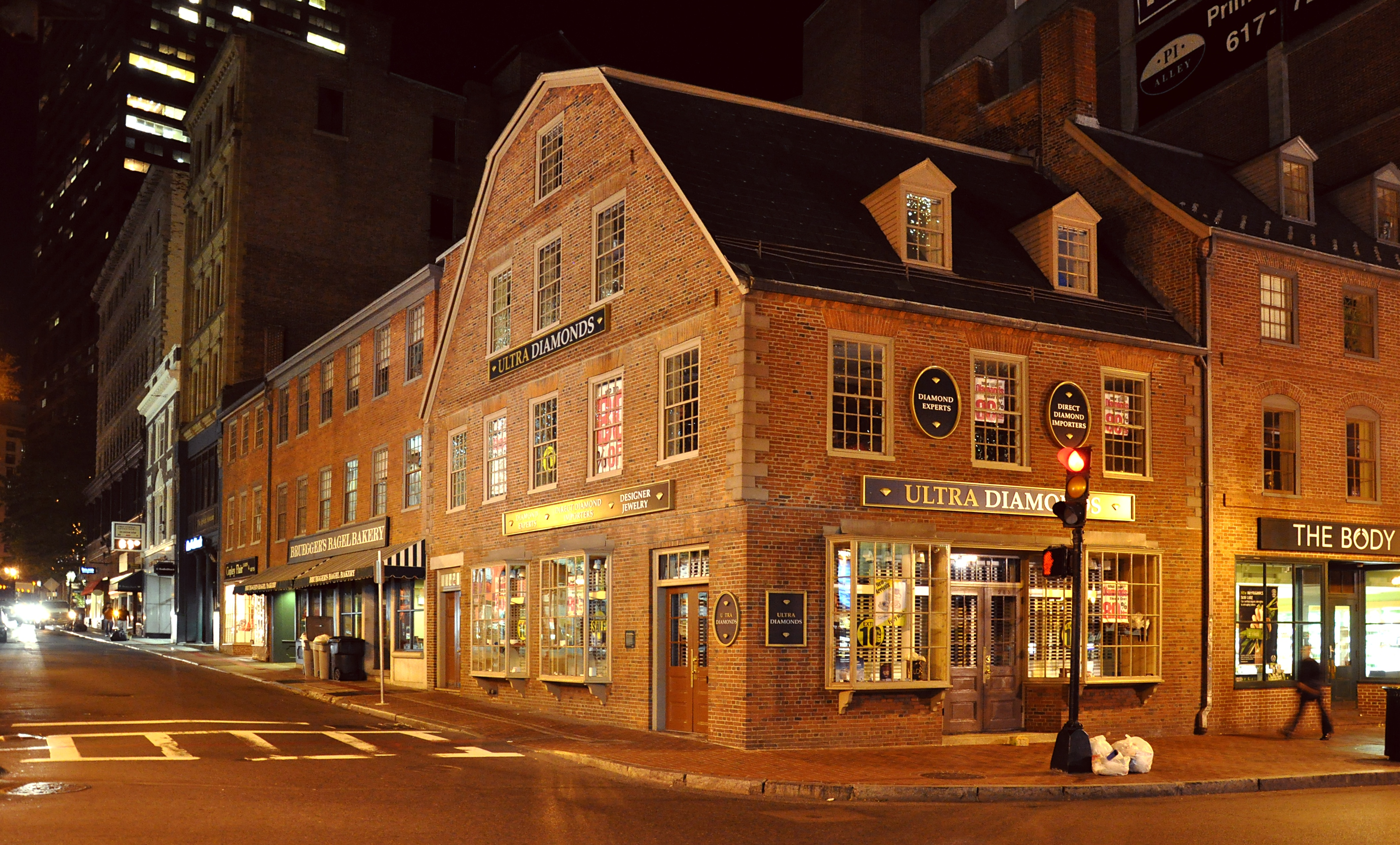
In the 19th century, the Old Corner Bookstore became a gathering place for writers, including Emerson, Thoreau, and Margaret Fuller. James Russell Lowell printed the first editions of The Atlantic Monthly at the store.

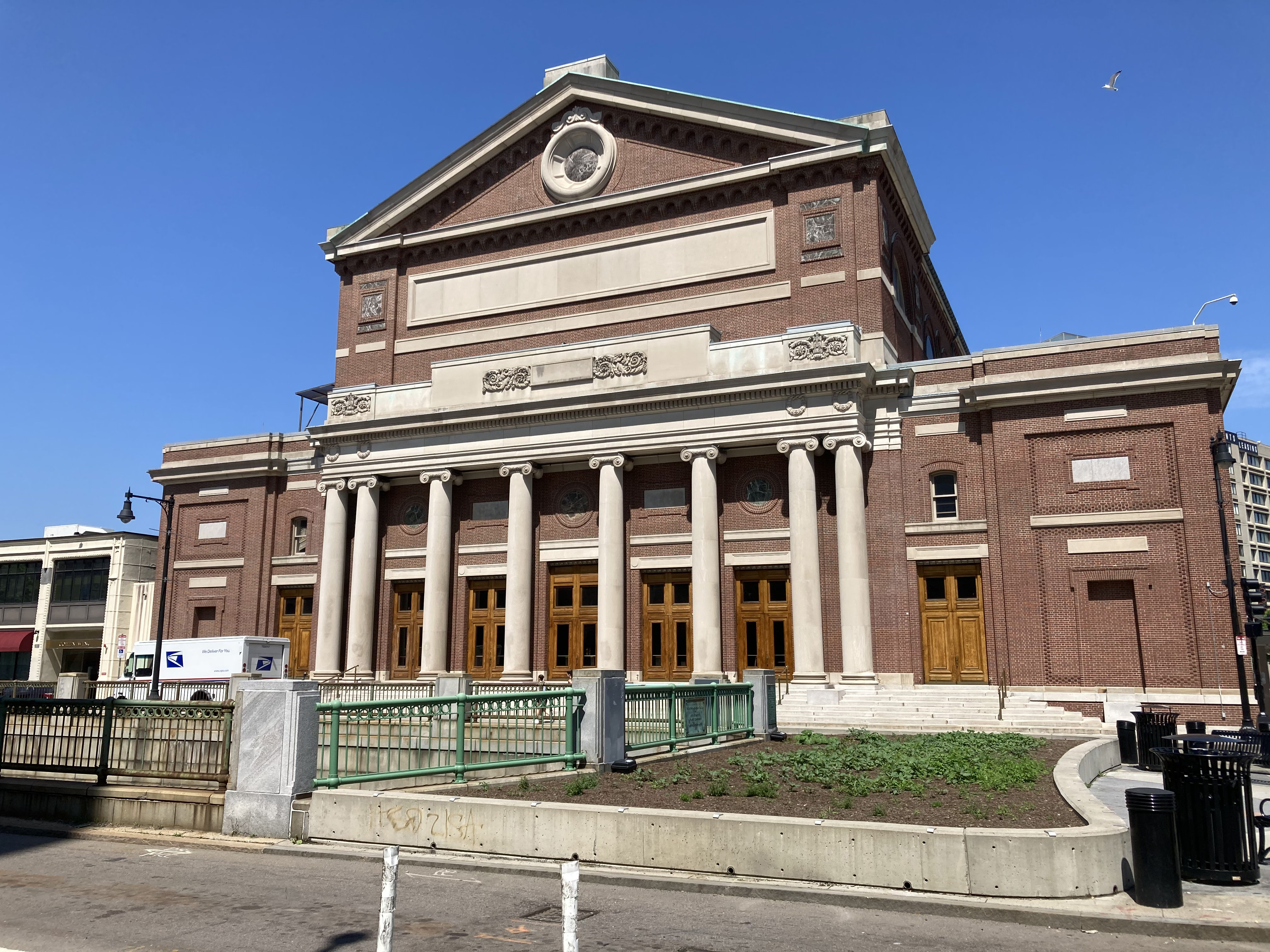
Symphony Hall at 301 Massachusetts Avenue, home of the Boston Symphony Orchestra

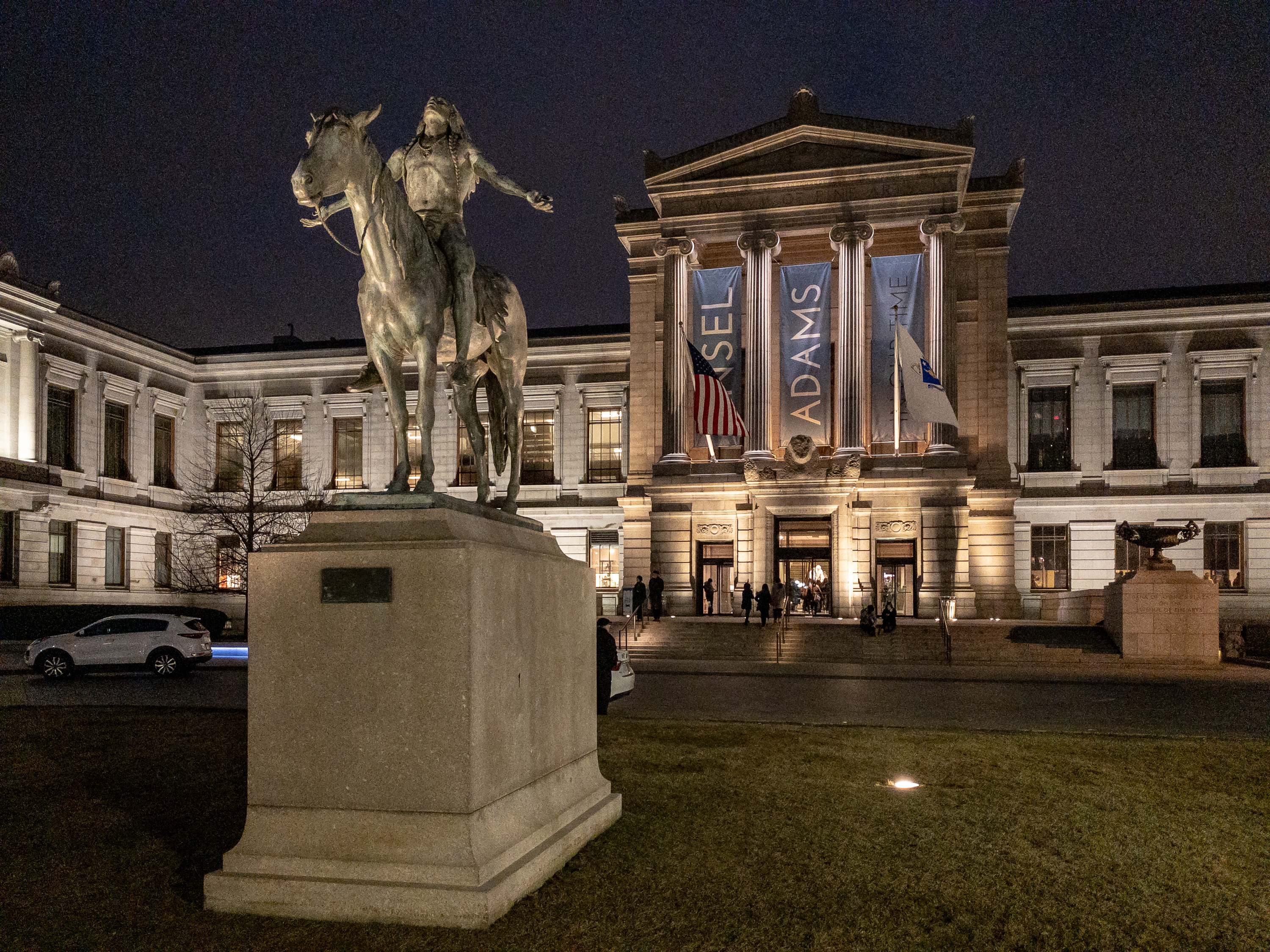
Museum of Fine Arts at 465 Huntington Avenue

Boston shares many cultural roots with greater New England, including a dialect of the non-rhotic Eastern New England accent known as the Boston accent and a regional cuisine with a large emphasis on seafood, salt, and dairy products. Boston also has its own collection of neologisms known as Boston slang and sardonic humor.

In the early 1800s, William Tudor wrote that Boston was "'perhaps the most perfect and certainly the best-regulated democracy that ever existed. There is something so impossible in the immortal fame of Athens, that the very name makes everything modern shrink from comparison; but since the days of that glorious city I know of none that has approached so near in some points, distant as it may still be from that illustrious model.' From this, Boston has been called the "Athens of America" (also a nickname of Philadelphia) for its literary culture, earning a reputation as "the intellectual capital of the United States".

In the 19th century, Ralph Waldo Emerson, Henry David Thoreau, Nathaniel Hawthorne, Margaret Fuller, James Russell Lowell, and Henry Wadsworth Longfellow wrote in Boston. Some consider the Old Corner Bookstore to be the "cradle of American literature", the place where these writers met and where The Atlantic Monthly was first published. In 1852, the Boston Public Library was founded as the first free library in the United States. Boston's literary culture continues today thanks to the city's many universities and the Boston Book Festival.

Music is afforded a high degree of civic support in Boston. The Boston Symphony Orchestra is one of the "Big Five", a group of the greatest American orchestras, and the classical music magazine Gramophone called it one of the "world's best" orchestras. Symphony Hall (west of Back Bay) is home to the Boston Symphony Orchestra and the related Boston Youth Symphony Orchestra, which is the largest youth orchestra in the nation, and to the Boston Pops Orchestra. Other concerts are held at the New England Conservatory's Jordan Hall. The Boston Ballet performs at the Boston Opera House. Other performing-arts organizations in the city include the Boston Lyric Opera Company, Opera Boston, Boston Baroque (the first permanent Baroque orchestra in the US), and the Handel and Haydn Society (one of the oldest choral companies in the United States).

Boston is a center for contemporary classical music with a number of performing groups, several of which are associated with the city's conservatories and universities. These include the Boston Modern Orchestra Project and Boston Musica Viva. Several theaters are in or near the Theater District south of Boston Common, including the Cutler Majestic Theatre, Citi Performing Arts Center, the Colonial Theater, and the Orpheum Theatre.

There are several major annual events, such as First Night, which occurs on New Year's Eve, the Boston Early Music Festival, the annual Boston Arts Festival at Christopher Columbus Waterfront Park, the annual Boston gay pride parade and festival held in June, and Italian summer feasts in the North End honoring Catholic saints. The city is the site of several events during the Fourth of July period. They include the week-long Harborfest festivities and a Boston Pops concert accompanied by fireworks on the banks of the Charles River.

Several historic sites relating to the American Revolution period are preserved as part of the Boston National Historical Park because of the city's prominent role. Many are found along the Freedom Trail, which is marked by a red line of bricks embedded in the ground.

The city is home to several art museums and galleries, including the Museum of Fine Arts and Isabella Stewart Gardner Museum. The Institute of Contemporary Art is housed in a contemporary building designed by Diller Scofidio + Renfro in the Seaport District. Boston's South End Art and Design District (SoWa) and Newbury St. are both art gallery destinations. Columbia Point is the location of the University of Massachusetts Boston, the Edward M. Kennedy Institute for the United States Senate, the John F. Kennedy Presidential Library and Museum, and the Massachusetts Archives and Commonwealth Museum. The Boston Athenæum (one of the oldest independent libraries in the United States), Boston Children's Museum, Bull & Finch Pub (whose building is known from the television show Cheers), Museum of Science, and the New England Aquarium are within the city.

Boston has been a noted religious center from its earliest days. The Roman Catholic Archdiocese of Boston serves nearly 300 parishes and is based in the Cathedral of the Holy Cross (1875) in the South End, while the Episcopal Diocese of Massachusetts serves just under 200 congregations, with the Cathedral Church of St. Paul (1819) as its episcopal seat. Unitarian Universalism has its headquarters in the Fort Point neighborhood. The Christian Scientists are headquartered in Back Bay at the Mother Church (1894).

The oldest church in Boston is First Church in Boston, founded in 1630. King's Chapel was the city's first Anglican church, founded in 1686 and converted to Unitarianism in 1785. Other churches include Old South Church (1669), Christ Church (better known as Old North Church, 1723), the oldest church building in the city, Trinity Church (1733), Park Street Church (1809), and Basilica and Shrine of Our Lady of Perpetual Help on Mission Hill (1878).

== Sports ==
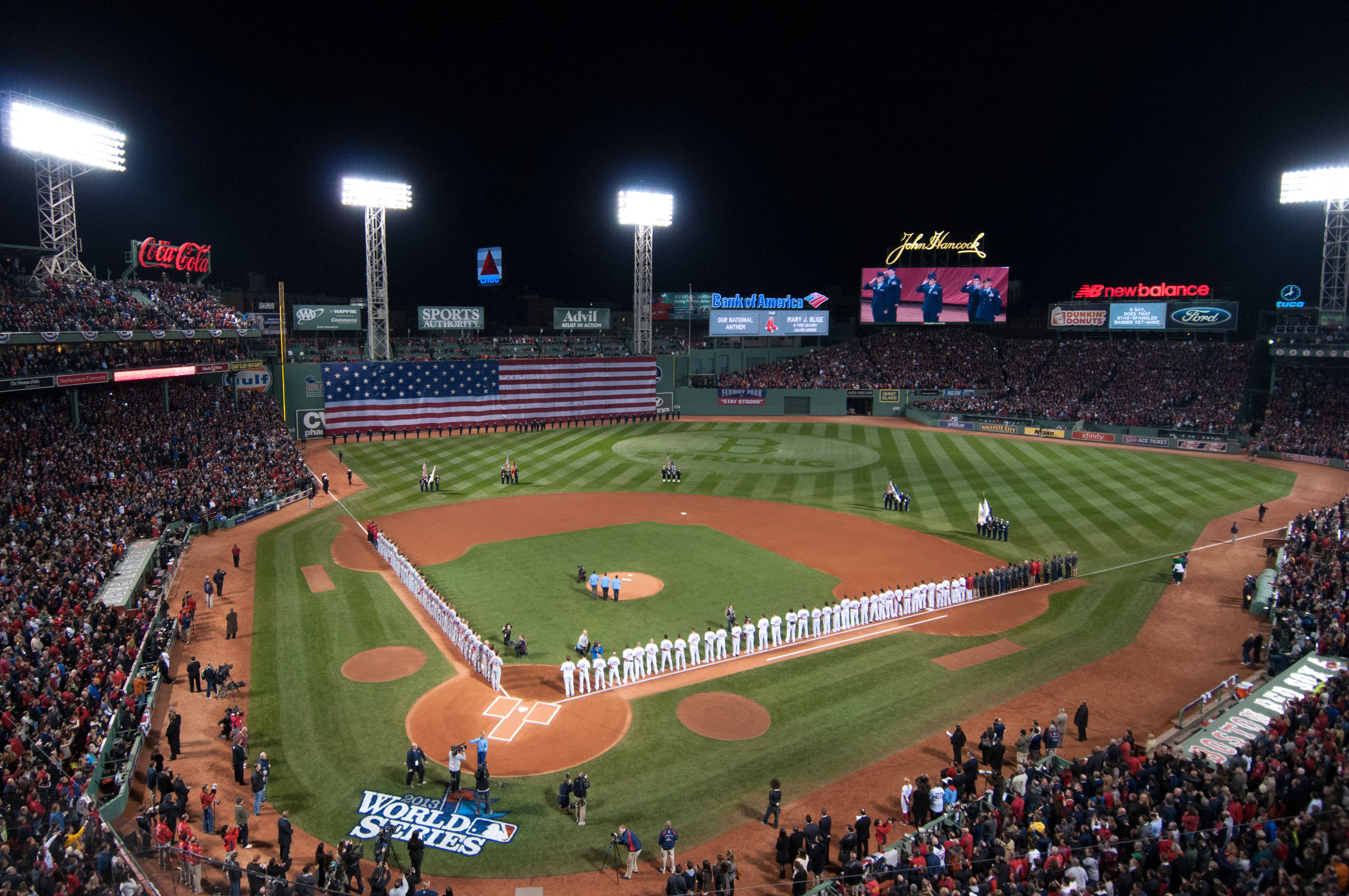
Fenway Park, home stadium of the Boston Red Sox. Opened in 1912, Fenway Park is the oldest professional baseball stadium still in use.

Boston has teams in the four major North American men's professional sports leagues as well as Major League Soccer. As of 2024, the city has won 40 championships in these leagues. During 23 years from 2001 to 2024, the city's professional sports teams have won thirteen championships: Patriots (2001, 2003, 2004, 2014, 2016 and 2018), Red Sox (2004, 2007, 2013, and 2018), Celtics (2008, 2024), and Bruins (2011).

The Boston Red Sox, a founding member of the American League of Major League Baseball in 1901, play their home games at Fenway Park, near Kenmore Square, in the city's Fenway section. Built in 1912, it is the oldest sports arena or stadium in active use in the United States among the four major professional American sports leagues, Major League Baseball, the National Football League, National Basketball Association, and the National Hockey League. Boston was the site of the first game of the first modern World Series, in 1903. The series was played between the AL Champion Boston Americans and the NL champion Pittsburgh Pirates.

Persistent reports that the team was known in 1903 as the "Boston Pilgrims" appear to be unfounded. Boston's first professional baseball team was the Red Stockings, one of the charter members of the National Association in 1871, and of the National League in 1876. The team played under that name until 1883, under the name Beaneaters until 1911, and under the name Braves from 1912 until they moved to Milwaukee after the 1952 season. Since 1966 they have played in Atlanta as the Atlanta Braves.

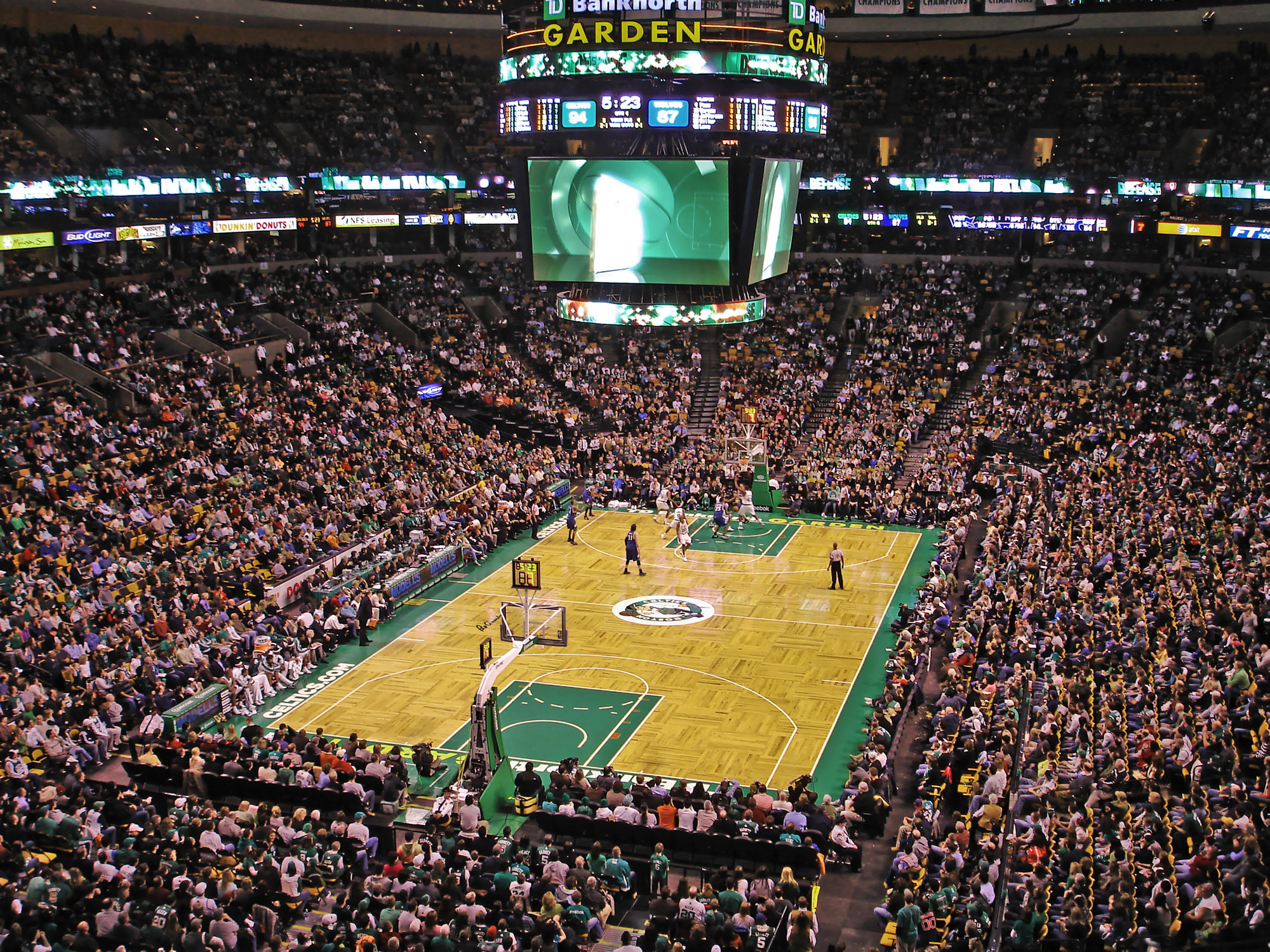
The Boston Celtics of the National Basketball Association playing at TD Garden

TD Garden, formerly called the FleetCenter and built to replace the since-demolished Boston Garden, is above North Station and is the home of two major league teams: the Boston Bruins of the National Hockey League and the Boston Celtics of the National Basketball Association. The Bruins were the first American member of the National Hockey League and an Original Six franchise. The Boston Celtics were founding members of the Basketball Association of America, one of the two leagues that merged to form the NBA. The Celtics have won eighteen championships, the most of any NBA team.

While they have played in suburban Foxborough since 1971, the New England Patriots of the National Football League were founded in 1960 as the Boston Patriots, changing their name after relocating. The team won the Super Bowl after the 2001, 2003, 2004, 2014, 2016, and 2018 seasons. They share Gillette Stadium with the New England Revolution of Major League Soccer. Another team associated with Boston who plays outside the city is the Boston Fleet of the PWHL, which plays at the Tsongas Center in nearby Lowell. During the inaugural 2024 PWHL playoffs, the Fleet (then known as PWHL Boston) made it to the Walter Cup finals, where they lost to the Minnesota Frost (PWHL Minnesota at the time).

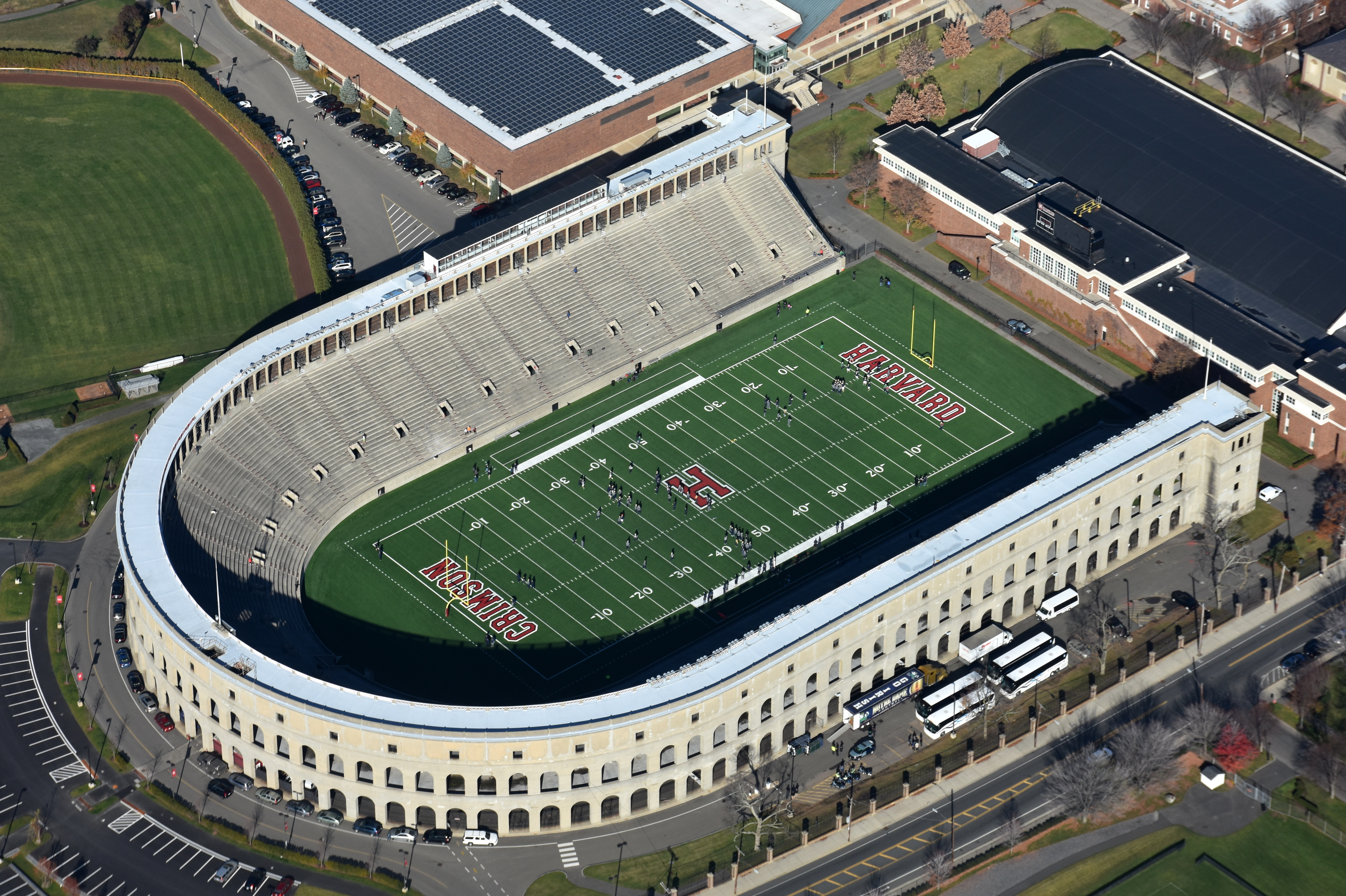
Harvard Stadium, the nation's first collegiate athletic stadium made of concrete

The area's many colleges and universities are active in college athletics. Four NCAA Division I members play in the area—Boston College, Boston University, Harvard University, and Northeastern University. Of the four, only Boston College participates in college football at the highest level, the Football Bowl Subdivision. Harvard participates in the second-highest level, the Football Championship Subdivision. These four universities participate in the Beanpot, an annual men's and women's ice hockey tournament. The men's Beanpot is hosted at the TD Garden, while the women's Beanpot is held at each member school's home arena on a rotating basis.

Boston has Esports teams, such as the Overwatch League (OWL)'s Boston Uprising. Established in 2017, they were the first team to complete a perfect stage with 0 losses. The Boston Breach is another esports team in the Call of Duty League (CDL).

One of the best-known sporting events in the city is the Boston Marathon, the 26.2 mi (42.2 km) race which is the world's oldest annual marathon, run on Patriots' Day in April. The Red Sox traditionally play a home game starting around 11 a.m. on the same day, with the early start time allowing fans to watch runners finish the race nearby after the conclusion of the ballgame. Another major annual event is the Head of the Charles Regatta, held in October.

Major sports teams
Team	League	Sport	Venue	Capacity	Founded	Championships
Boston Red Sox	MLB	Baseball	Fenway Park	37,755	1903	1903, 1912, 1915, 1916, 1918, 2004, 2007, 2013, 2018
Boston Bruins	NHL	Ice hockey	TD Garden	17,850	1924	1928–29, 1938–39, 1940–41, 1969–70, 1971–72, 2010–11
Boston Celtics	NBA	Basketball	TD Garden	19,156	1946	1956–57, 1958–59, 1959–60, 1960–61, 1961–62, 1962–63, 1963–64, 1964–65, 1965–66, 1967–68, 1968–69, 1973–74, 1975–76, 1980–81, 1983–84, 1985–86, 2007–08, 2023–24
New England Patriots	NFL	American football	Gillette Stadium	65,878	1960	2001, 2003, 2004, 2014, 2016, 2018
New England Revolution	MLS	Soccer	Gillette Stadium	20,000	1996	None

== Parks and recreation ==
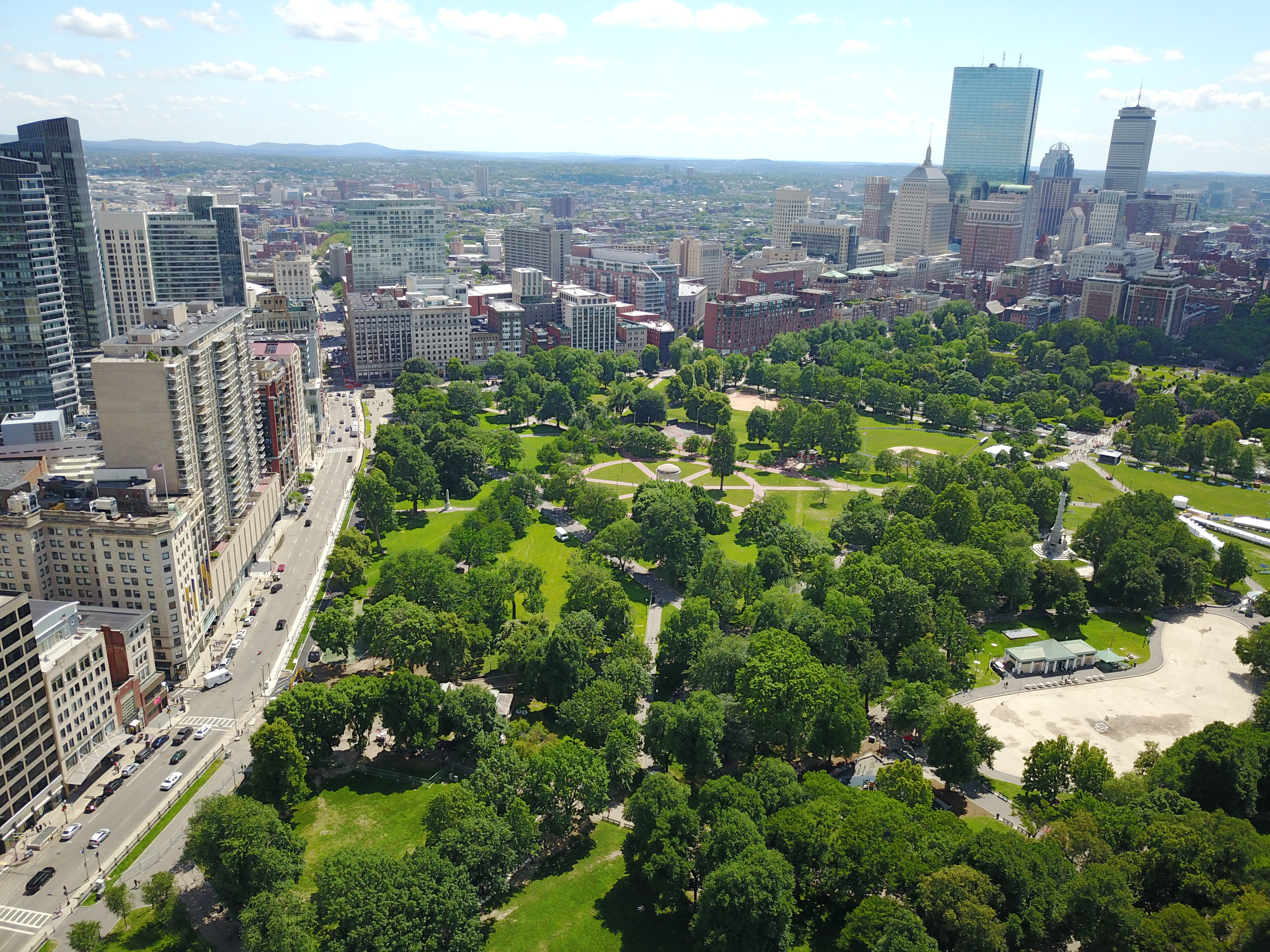
An aerial view of Boston Common in Downtown Boston

Boston Common, near the Financial District and Beacon Hill, is the oldest public park in the United States. Along with the adjacent Boston Public Garden, it is part of the Emerald Necklace, a string of parks designed by Frederick Law Olmsted to run through the city. The Emerald Necklace includes the Back Bay Fens, Arnold Arboretum, Jamaica Pond, Boston's largest body of freshwater, and Franklin Park, the city's largest park and home of the Franklin Park Zoo.

Another major park is the Esplanade, along the banks of the Charles River. The Hatch Shell, an outdoor concert venue, is adjacent to the Charles River Esplanade. Other parks are scattered throughout the city, with major parks and beaches near Castle Island and the south end, in Charlestown and along the Dorchester, South Boston, and East Boston shorelines.

== Media ==
=== Newspapers ===
The Boston Globe is the oldest and largest daily newspaper in the city and is generally acknowledged as its paper of record. Boston is served by other publications such as the Boston Herald, Boston magazine, the Boston Business Journal, and the luxury magazine Boston Common. The Christian Science Monitor, headquartered in Boston, was formerly a worldwide daily newspaper but ended publication of daily print editions in 2009, switching to continuous online and weekly magazine format publications. The Boston Globe also releases a teen publication to the city's public high schools, called Teens in Print or T.i.P., which is written by the city's teens and delivered quarterly within the school year. The Improper Bostonian, a glossy lifestyle magazine, was published from 1991 to April 2019.

Boston's black community is served by the Bay State Banner, a newspaper focused on the issues of interest to black Bostonians. The Bay State Banner has operated since 1965.

The city's growing Latino population has given rise to a number of local and regional Spanish-language newspapers. These include El Planeta (owned by the former publisher of the Boston Phoenix), El Mundo, and La Semana. Siglo21, with its main offices in nearby Lawrence, is also widely distributed.

LGBT publications serve Boston's large LGBT (lesbian, gay, bisexual, and transgender) population, such as The Rainbow Times, the only minority- and lesbian-owned LGBT news magazine. Founded in 2006, The Rainbow Times is now based out of Boston, but serves all of New England.

=== Radio and television ===
Boston is the largest broadcasting market in New England, with the radio market being the ninth largest in the United States. Several major AM stations include talk radio WRKO, sports/talk station WEEI, and news radio WBZ (AM). WBZ is a 50,000-watt "clear channel" station whose nighttime broadcasts are heard hundreds of miles from Boston. A variety of commercial FM radio formats serve the area, as do NPR stations WBUR and WGBH. College and university radio stations include WERS (Emerson), WHRB (Harvard), WUMB (UMass Boston), WMBR (MIT), WZBC (Boston College), WMFO (Tufts University), WBRS (Brandeis University), WRBB (Northeastern University) and WMLN-FM (Curry College).

The Boston television DMA, which also includes Manchester, New Hampshire, is the eighth largest in the United States. The city is served by stations representing every major American network, including WBZ-TV 4 and its sister station WSBK-TV 38 (the former a CBS station, the latter an independent station), WCVB-TV 5 and its sister station WMUR-TV 9 (both ABC), WHDH 7 and its sister station WLVI 56 (the former an independent station, the latter a CW affiliate), WBTS-CD 15 (an NBC station), and WFXT 25 (Fox). The city is also home to PBS member station WGBH-TV 2, a major producer of PBS programs, which also operates WGBX 44.

Spanish-language television networks, including UniMás (WUTF-TV 27), Telemundo (WNEU 60, a sister station to WBTS-CD), and Univisión (WUNI 66), have a presence in the region, with WNEU and WUNI serving as network owned-and-operated stations. Most of the area's television stations have their transmitters in nearby Needham and Newton along the Route 128 corridor. Seven Boston television stations are carried by satellite television and cable television providers in Canada.

== Infrastructure ==
=== Healthcare ===
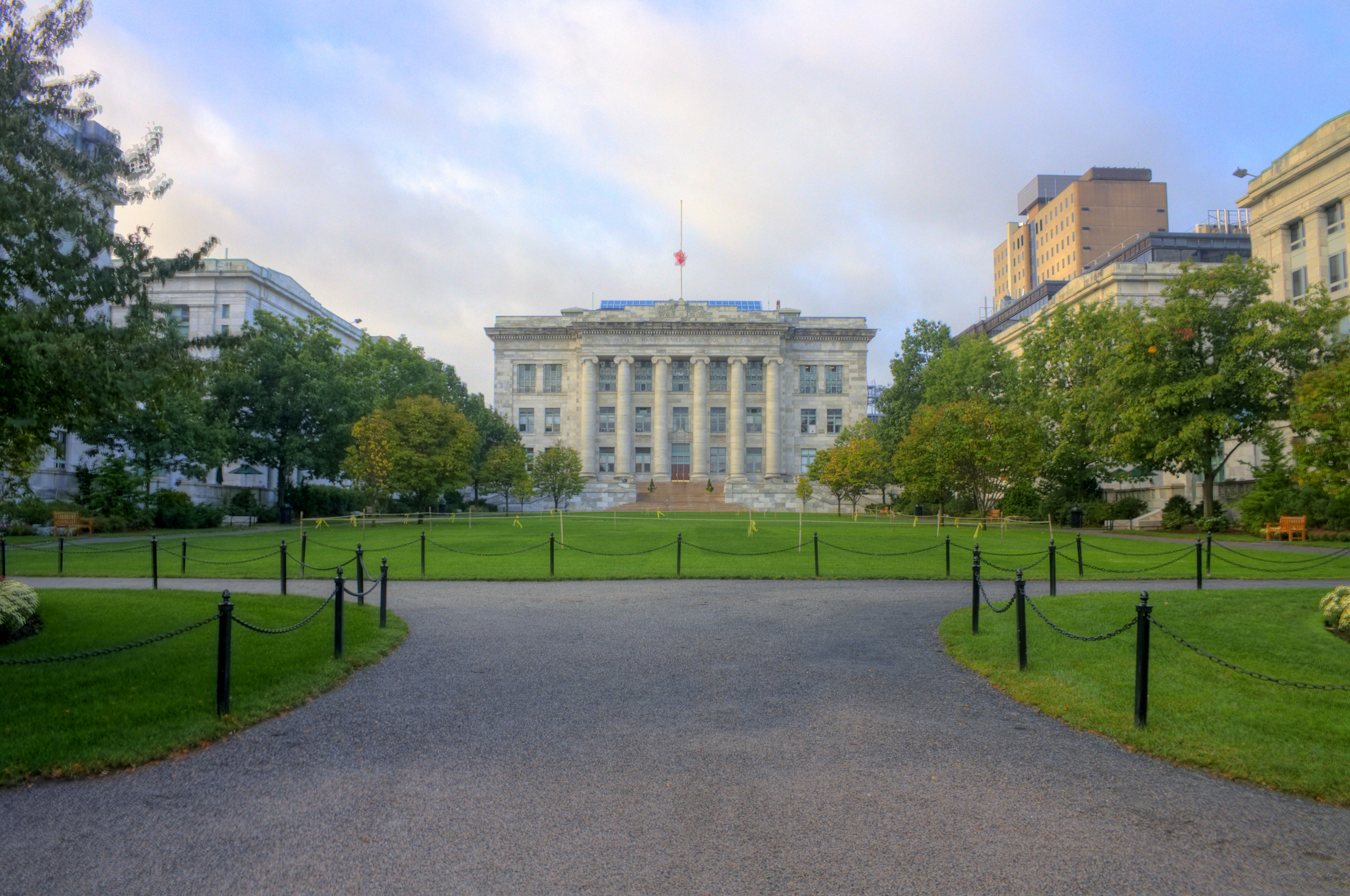
Harvard Medical School

Many of Boston's medical facilities are associated with universities. The Longwood Medical and Academic Area, adjacent to the Fenway, district, is home to a large number of medical and research facilities, including Beth Israel Deaconess Medical Center, Brigham and Women's Hospital, Boston Children's Hospital, Dana–Farber Cancer Institute, and Joslin Diabetes Center. Prominent medical facilities, including Massachusetts General Hospital, Massachusetts Eye and Ear Infirmary and Spaulding Rehabilitation Hospital are in the Beacon Hill area. Many of the facilities in Longwood and near Massachusetts General Hospital are affiliated with Harvard Medical School.

Tufts Medical Center (formerly Tufts-New England Medical Center), in the southern portion of the Chinatown neighborhood, is affiliated with Tufts University School of Medicine. Boston Medical Center, in the South End neighborhood, is the region's largest safety-net hospital and trauma center. Formed by the merger of Boston City Hospital, the first municipal hospital in the United States, and Boston University Hospital, Boston Medical Center now serves as the primary teaching facility for the Boston University School of Medicine. Boston Medical Center – Brighton (formerly St. Elizabeth's Medical Center) is located in the Brighton neighborhood. New England Baptist Hospital is in Mission Hill. The city has Veterans Affairs medical centers in the Jamaica Plain and West Roxbury neighborhoods.

=== Transportation ===
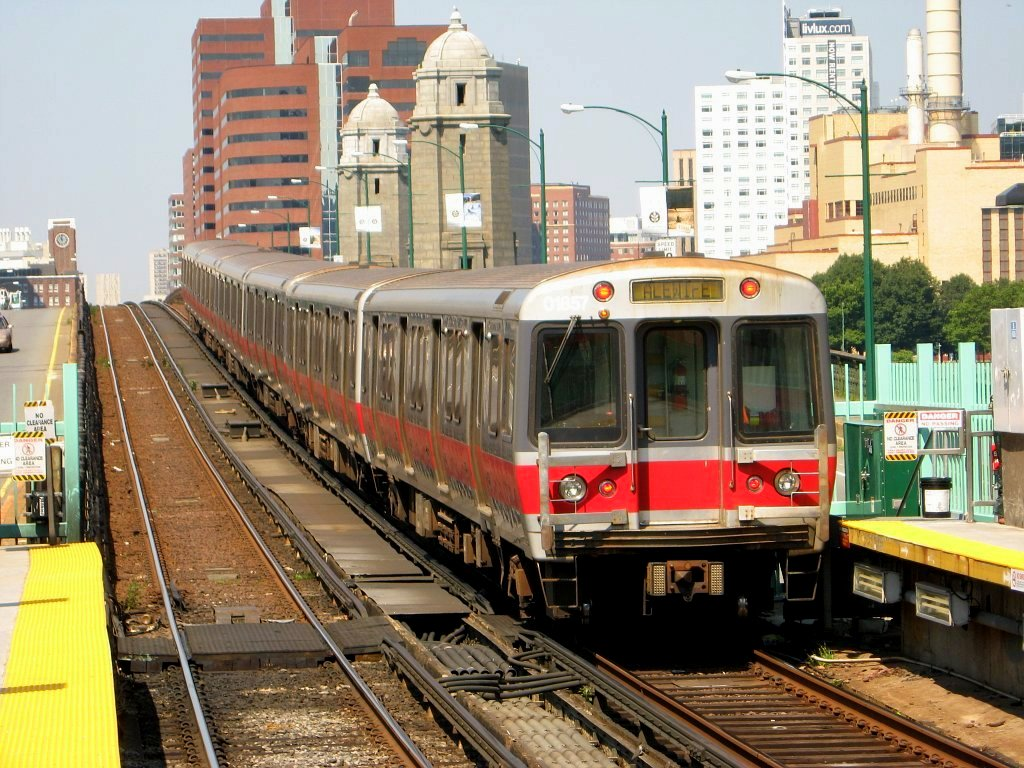
An MBTA Red Line train departing Boston for Cambridge. Over 1.3 million Bostonians utilize the city's buses and trains daily as of 2013.

Logan International Airport, in East Boston and operated by the Massachusetts Port Authority (Massport), is Boston's principal airport. Nearby general aviation airports are Beverly Regional Airport and Lawrence Municipal Airport to the north, Hanscom Field to the west, and Norwood Memorial Airport to the south. Massport also operates several major facilities within the Port of Boston, including a cruise ship terminal and facilities to handle bulk and container cargo in South Boston, and other facilities in Charlestown and East Boston.

Downtown Boston's streets grew organically, so they do not form a planned grid, unlike those in later-developed Back Bay, East Boston, the South End, and South Boston. Boston is the eastern terminus of I-90, which in Massachusetts runs along the Massachusetts Turnpike. The Central Artery follows I-93 as the primary north–south artery that carries most of the through traffic in Downtown Boston. Other major highways include US 1, which carries traffic to the North Shore and areas south of Boston; US 3, which connects to the northwestern suburbs; MA 3, which connects to the South Shore and Cape Cod; and MA 2, which connects to the western suburbs. Surrounding the city is MA 128, a partial beltway which has been largely subsumed by other routes (mostly I-95 and I-93).

With nearly a third of Bostonians using public transit for their commute to work, Boston has the sixth-highest rate of public transit usage in the country. The city of Boston has a higher than average percentage of households without a car. In 2016, 33.8 percent of Boston households lacked a car, compared with the national average of 8.7 percent. The city averaged 0.94 cars per household in 2016, compared to a national average of 1.8. Boston's public transportation agency, the Massachusetts Bay Transportation Authority (MBTA), operates the oldest underground rapid transit system in the Americas and is the fourth-busiest rapid transit system in the country, with 65.5 mi (105 km) of track on four lines. The MBTA also operates busy bus, commuter rail, and ferry networks.

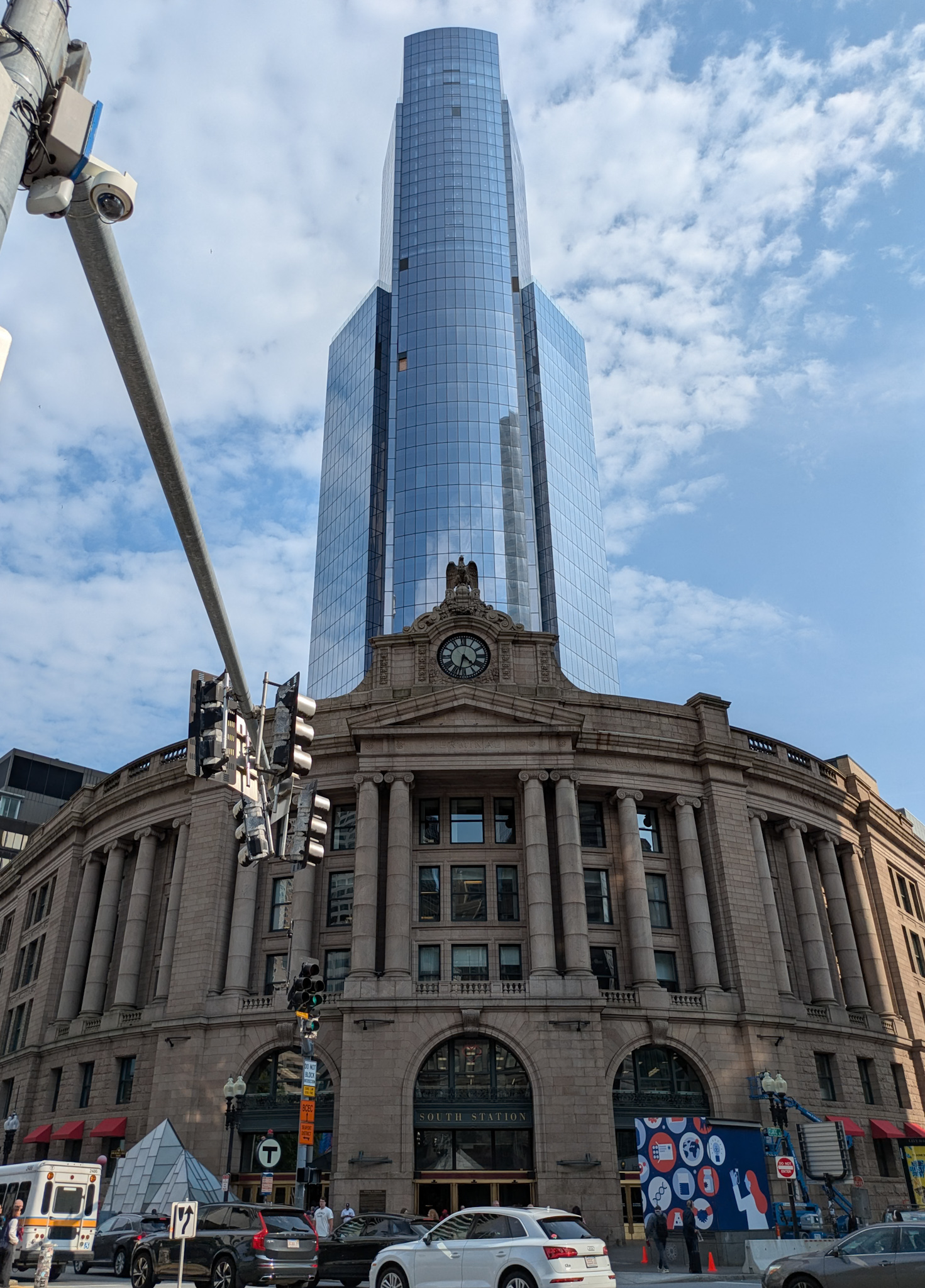
South Station, the busiest rail hub in New England and a terminus for Amtrak and numerous MBTA rail lines

Amtrak intercity rail to Boston is provided through four stations: South Station, North Station, Back Bay, and Route 128. South Station is a major intermodal transportation hub and is the terminus of Amtrak's Northeast Regional, Acela, and Lake Shore Limited routes, in addition to multiple MBTA services. MBTA and those three Amtrak routes also serve Back Bay. In contrast, Route 128, in the southwestern suburbs of Boston, is only served by the Acela and Northeast Regional. Meanwhile, Amtrak's Downeaster to Brunswick, Maine terminates in North Station. It is the only Amtrak route to do so.

Nicknamed "The Walking City", Boston hosts more pedestrian commuters than do other comparably populated cities. Owing to factors such as necessity, the compactness of the city, and a large student population, 13 percent of the population commutes by foot, making it the highest percentage of pedestrian commuters in the country out of the major American cities. As of 2024, Walk Score ranks Boston as the third most walkable U.S. city, with a Walk Score of 83, a Transit Score of 72, and a Bike Score of 69.

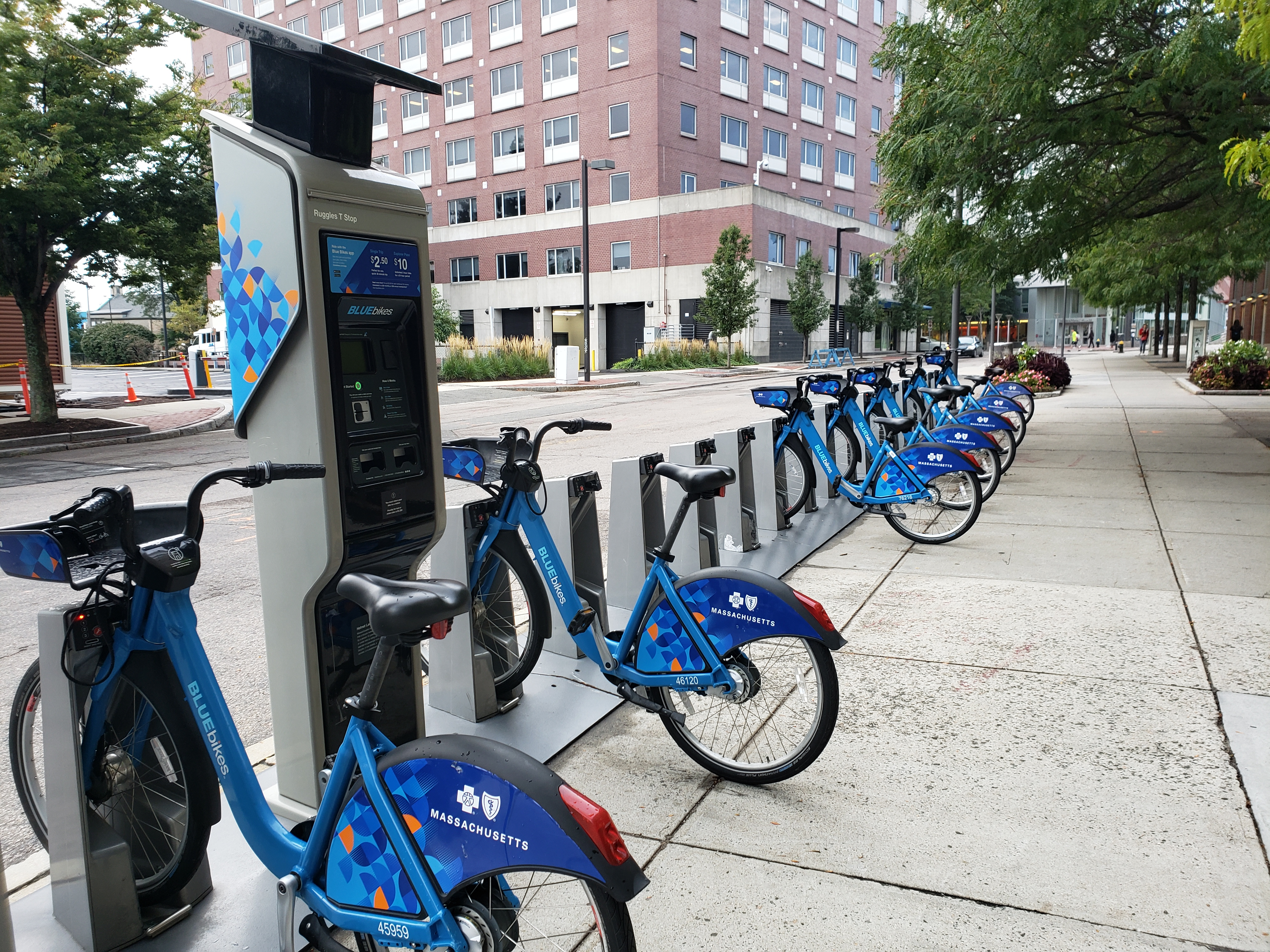
Bluebikes in Boston

Boston has one of the highest rates of bicycle commuting. The bikeshare program Bluebikes, originally called Hubway, launched in late July 2011. The system has 480 stations with a total of 4,500 bikes. PBSC Urban Solutions provides bicycles and technology for this bike-sharing system.

== International relations ==
The City of Boston has eleven official sister cities:

- Kyoto, Japan (1959)
- Strasbourg, France (1960)
- Barcelona, Spain (1980)
- Hangzhou, China (1982)
- Padua, Italy (1983)
- Melbourne, Australia (1985)
- Beira, Mozambique (1990)
- Taipei, Taiwan (1996)
- Sekondi-Takoradi, Ghana (2001)
- Belfast, United Kingdom (2014)
- Praia, Cape Verde (2015)

Boston has formal partnership relationships through a Memorandum of Understanding with five additional cities or regions:

- Guangzhou, China (2014)
- Lyon, France (2016)
- Copenhagen, Denmark (2017)
- Mexico City, Mexico (2017)
- North West of Ireland, Ireland (2017)

== See also ==
- Boston Citgo Sign
- Boston City League (high-school athletic conference)
- National Register of Historic Places listings in Boston
- Outline of Boston
- USS Boston, seven ships

== Works cited ==
- Bluestone, Barry; Stevenson, Mary Huff (2002). The Boston Renaissance: Race, Space, and Economic Change in an American Metropolis. Russell Sage Foundation. ISBN 978-1-61044-072-1.
- Bolino, August C. (2012), Men of Massachusetts: Bay State Contributors to American Society, iUniverse, ISBN 9781475933765
- Christopher, Paul J. (2006). 50 Plus One Greatest Cities in the World You Should Visit. Encouragement Press, LLC. ISBN 978-1-933766-01-0.
- Hull, Sarah (2011). The Rough Guide to Boston (6 ed.). Penguin. ISBN 978-1-4053-8247-2.
- Kennedy, Lawrence W. (1994). Planning the City Upon a Hill: Boston Since 1630. University of Massachusetts Press. ISBN 978-0-87023-923-6.
- Morris, Jerry (2005). The Boston Globe Guide to Boston. Globe Pequot. ISBN 978-0-7627-3430-6.
- Vorhees, Mara (2009). Lonely Planet Boston City Guide (4th ed.). Lonely Planet. ISBN 978-1-74179-178-5.
