= Outline of Boston =

Capital of Massachusetts, United States

Flag of Boston

Seal of Boston

The following outline is provided as an overview of and topical guide to Boston:

Boston – capital city and most populous municipality of the Commonwealth of Massachusetts in the United States. It is also the seat of Suffolk County, although the county government was disbanded on July 1, 1999. Boston is one of the oldest cities in the United States, founded on the Shawmut Peninsula in 1630 by Puritan settlers from England. It was the scene of several key events of the American Revolution, such as the Boston Massacre, the Boston Tea Party, the Battle of Bunker Hill, and the Siege of Boston.

== General reference ==
- Pronunciation:
  - US: /ˈbɔːstən/ BAW-stən
  - UK: /ˈbɒstən/ BOS-tən
- Common English name(s): Boston
- Official English name(s): City of Boston
- Nicknames of Boston:
  - The Cradle of Liberty
  - Beantown
- Adjectival(s): Bostonian
- Demonym(s): Bostonian

== Geography of Boston ==
Geography of Boston

- Boston is:
  - a city
    - the county seat of Suffolk County
    - the capital of the Commonwealth of Massachusetts
    - primate city of the Commonwealth of Massachusetts
- Population of Boston: 673,184 (2016)
- Area of Boston: 89.63 sq mi (232.14 km^{2})
- Atlas of Boston

=== Location of Boston ===
- Boston is situated within the following regions:
  - Northern Hemisphere and Western Hemisphere
    - North America
      - Northern America
        - United States
          - Northeastern United States
            - Northeast megalopolis
            - New England
              - Massachusetts
                - Greater Boston
                  - Suffolk County
  - Time zone(s):

=== Areas of Boston ===
==== Neighborhoods in Boston ====
Neighborhoods of Boston

=== Locations in Boston ===
==== Parks and gardens in Boston ====
Park and gardens in Boston

=== Demographics of Boston ===
Demographics of Boston

== Government and politics of Boston ==
Government and politics of Boston

- Government of Boston
  - Mayors of Boston
  - Boston City Council
- Law enforcement in Boston
  - Boston Police Department
- International relations of Boston
  - Sister cities of Boston
  - Sister cities of Boston

== History of Boston ==
History of Boston

- Timeline of Boston

=== History of Boston, by period ===
- Timeline of Boston

=== History of Boston, by subject ===
- Battle of Boston
- Siege of Boston
- History of African Americans in Boston
- History of Irish Americans in Boston
- History of Italian Americans in Boston
- History of Korean Americans in Boston
- History of the Boston Braves
- History of the Boston Celtics
- History of the Boston Red Sox
- History of the New England Patriots

== Culture of Boston ==
Culture of Boston

- Architecture of Boston
  - Tallest building in Boston
- Cuisine of Boston
- Events in Boston
  - Annual events in Boston
- Media in Boston
- Museums in Boston
- People from Boston
- Symbols of Boston
  - Flag of Boston

=== Art in Boston ===
==== Cinema of Boston ====
Cinema of Boston

- Boston International Film Festival

==== Music of Boston ====
Music of Boston

- Boston Philharmonic Orchestra
- Songs about Boston

=== Religion in Boston ===
- Cemeteries in Boston
- Christianity in Boston
  - Bishop of Boston
  - Catholicism in Boston
    - Roman Catholic Archdiocese of Boston

=== Sports in Boston ===
- History of the Boston Braves

Sports in Boston

- Baseball in Boston
  - Boston Red Sox
    - History of the Boston Red Sox
    - List of Boston Red Sox managers
    - Boston Red Sox Hall of Fame
    - Boston Red Sox Radio Network
    - Boston Red Sox all-time roster
    - Boston Red Sox coaches
  - Baseball parks in Boston
- Basketball in Boston
  - Boston Celtics
    - Boston Celtics Radio Network
    - Boston Celtics all-time roster
    - History of the Boston Celtics
      - Boston Celtics draft history
    - List of Boston Celtics accomplishments and records
    - List of Boston Celtics broadcasters
    - List of Boston Celtics head coaches
    - List of Boston Celtics seasons
- Football in Boston
  - American football in Boston
    - New England Patriots
      - History of the New England Patriots
        - New England Patriots seasons
        - 2007 New England Patriots videotaping controversy
        - 2007 New England Patriots–New York Giants game
      - New England Patriots broadcasters
      - New England Patriots Cheerleaders
      - New England Patriots head coaches
      - New England Patriots players
        - New England Patriots first-round draft picks
        - New England Patriots starting quarterbacks
      - New England Patriots Radio Network
      - New England Patriots strategy
  - Soccer in Boston
    - Boston Braves F.C.
- Hockey in Boston
  - Boston Bruins
    - Boston Bruins Ice Girls
    - Boston Bruins Radio Network
    - List of Boston Bruins players
- Running in Boston
  - Boston Marathon
    - List of winners of the Boston Marathon
    - Boston Marathon Qualifying Standards
    - Boston Marathon bombing

== Economy and infrastructure of Boston ==
Economy of Boston

- Communications in Boston
  - Media in Boston
- Public services in Boston
  - Boston Fire Department
  - Boston Police Department
  - Boston Public Library

=== Transportation in Boston ===
Transport in Boston

- Air transport in Boston
  - Airports in Boston
- Maritime transport in Boston
  - Port of Boston
- Rail transit in Boston
  - MBTA subway
    - List of MBTA subway stations
- Road transport in Boston
  - MBTA bus
    - List of MBTA bus routes
  - Cycling in Boston

== Education in Boston ==
Education in Boston

- Secondary education in Boston
  - List of colleges and universities in metropolitan Boston
    - List of colleges in Boston
      - Boston College
        - List of Boston College people
        - Boston College Center for Corporate Citizenship
        - Boston College Center for Work and Family
        - Boston College Club Hockey
        - Boston College Eagles
        - Boston College Eagles baseball
        - Boston College Eagles football
        - Boston College Eagles football statistical leaders
        - Boston College Eagles ice hockey
        - Boston College Eagles men's basketball
        - Boston College Eagles men's ice hockey
        - Boston College Eagles men's soccer
        - Boston College Eagles softball
        - Boston College Eagles sports radio networks
        - Boston College Eagles women's basketball
        - Boston College Eagles women's ice hockey
        - Boston College Graduate School of Arts & Sciences
        - Boston College High School
        - Boston College Law Review
        - Boston College Law School
        - Boston College Main Campus Historic District
        - Boston College Marching Band
        - Boston College Media Research and Action Project
        - Boston College Men's Squash
        - Boston College Rugby Football Club
        - Boston College School of Social Work
        - Boston College School of Theology and Ministry
        - Boston College–Holy Cross football rivalry
        - Boston College–UMass football rivalry
        - Boston College–Virginia Tech football rivalry
    - Universities in Boston
      - University of Boston
        - List of Boston University people
        - Boston University Academy
        - Boston University Bridge
        - Boston University Brussels
        - Boston University Center for Philosophy and History of Science
        - Boston University Central (MBTA station)
        - Boston University College of Arts and Sciences
        - Boston University College of Communication
        - Boston University College of Engineering
        - Boston University College of Fine Arts
        - Boston University College of General Studies
        - Boston University College of Health and Rehabilitation Sciences (Sargent College)
        - Boston University Debate Society
        - Boston University Division of Emerging Media Studies
        - Boston University East (MBTA station)
        - Boston University Housing System
        - Boston University Libraries
        - Boston University Medical Campus
        - Boston University Metropolitan College
        - Boston University Photonics Center
        - Boston University Police Department
        - Boston University School of Education
        - Boston University School of Law
        - Boston University School of Medicine
        - Boston University School of Public Health
        - Boston University School of Social Work
        - Boston University School of Theology
        - Boston University Tanglewood Institute
        - Boston University Terriers
          - Boston University Terriers football
          - Boston University Terriers ice hockey
          - Boston University Terriers men's basketball
          - Boston University Terriers men's ice hockey
          - Boston University Terriers women's basketball
          - Boston University Terriers women's ice hockey
        - Boston University Track and Tennis Center
        - Boston University West (MBTA station)
        - Boston University–Holy Cross rivalry

== See also ==
- Outline of geography
- Outline of Massachusetts
- Index of Massachusetts-related articles
- List of airports in the Boston area
- List of people from Boston
- List of songs about Boston
- List of tallest buildings in Boston
- List of television shows set in Boston
