= Sana Bagersh =

Ethiopian-born American journalist

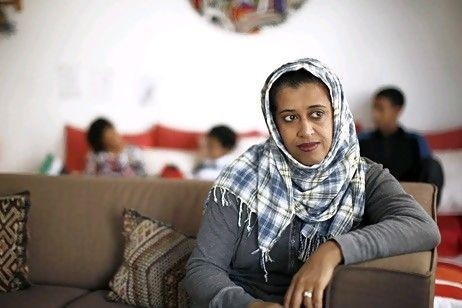
- Born: May 2, 1963 (age 63); Addis Ababa, Ethiopia
- Education: University of Tennessee (BS)
- Occupations: CEO of BrandMoxie, Entrepreneur, Journalist
- Organizations: BrandMoxie (CEO); Tamakkan (Founder); Tempo Magazine (Established); The Dream Players (Founder)
- Known for: Entrepreneurship, Media, Social Responsibility
- Title: CEO
- Spouse: Ali Bukair
- Awards: Tamayyuz Award (2009)

Sana Bagersh is an American entrepreneur, media innovator, and social responsibility advocate in the United Arab Emirates. As the CEO of BrandMoxie and founder of Tamakkan, her work focuses on business development, media, and women's professional programs. Her projects include founding Tempo magazine, The Dream Players, and launching initiatives like The Smovies, while promoting corporate social responsibility and cross cultural understanding in the Gulf region.

== Early life and education ==
Bagersh was born on May 2, 1963, in Addis Ababa, Ethiopia, to Yemeni parents. She is the daughter of Abubaker Bagersh and Fozia Baobeid, whose origins are Shibam, Hadhramut in Yemen. She studied at the Sandford English School in Addis Ababa, and the University of Tennessee in Knoxville, Tennessee.

Bagersh is sister to Abdullah Bagersh who runs Bagersh Coffee, and is the Coffee Commissioner of Ethiopia. [As of July 2015 he was also board chairman African Fine Coffee Association], Omar Bagersh who is a financial consultant and runs the Bishangari eco-tourism lodge near Addis Ababa, Yasser Bagersh who is an art curator and veteran stage actor/producer (founded Houston-based Express Theatre) and currently runs Cactus Advertising and a string of high end and casual dining restaurants. Yasser is the founder of Our Father's Kitchen, a charity that feeds over 300 AIDS stricken children daily. Sana's other brothers are Gassan Bagersh (runs a publishing business and a chain of bookstores), and Waleed Bagersh (head of Bagersh Coffee's retail product "Tarara Coffee.")

== Career ==
=== Early professional background ===
Bagersh started her career as a journalist at Gulf News in the UAE, where she worked for five years, covering economic, social and cultural news stories. She moved to Seattle, Washington in 1991 where she worked briefly in Decision Data and Gilmore Research Group before setting up Alla Italia, a gourmet restaurant and catering company.

Upon the family's return to the UAE in 1997, Bagersh was appointed bureau chief of Gulf News. Through her work she met personalities such as Sheikh Zayed bin Sultan al Nahyan, Kofi Annan, Princess Diana and Prince Charles, Nelson Mandela, Wilfred Thesiger, Yasser Arafat, Kurt Waldheim, Muammar al Gaddafi, Richard Branson, George Bush Sr, Benazir Bhutto, and others.

In 1999, Bagersh joined Thuraya Satellite Telecommunications Company, a UAE based telecom company. Over eight years as Media Relations Officer, and then as manager of marketing services. Bagersh led a team that set up the marketing communications infrastructure for Thuraya in multiple languages across different media channels, for campaigns in a footprint of 110 countries.

In March 2015 BrandMoxie, in collaboration with Rooftop Rhythms, and supported by Sorbonne University and the US Embassy in Abu Dhabi, launched The Abu Dhabi International Poetry Festival, which featured locally based and international poets.

In July 2017, Bagersh was a part of the #BreakTheGlass campaign headed by Empower Women, an online platform jointly developed by UN Women and Canada for women's economic empowerment.

=== Current professional background ===
Sana Bagersh is active in community outreach and is a strong champion of corporate social responsibility. She founded Tamakkan, an entrepreneurship and leadership organization in July 2009, to offer guidance to SMEs through monthly entrepreneurship seminars. Tamakkan partnered at different times with AmCham Abu Dhabi, Mubadala GE, Aldar, INSEAD, Franklin Covey Middle East, Wollongong University, Boston University Brussels and others. Speakers have included Stephen M.R. Covey, president and CEO of Covey Leadership Centre, Mark Thompson CEO and co-founder of Virgin Unite Mentors. Tamakkan has received the support and patronage of the Fatima Bint Hazza Foundation, an entity that supports cultural and artistic initiatives in the UAE.

Bagersh has taught as adjunct professor at Zayed University. She also served on the university industry advisory committees at the Higher Colleges of Technology Women's College, the Abu Dhabi Vocational Institute and Zayed University. BrandMoxie received the Tamayyuz Award in 2009 for its support of Emirati training and internship programmes.

Bagersh established Tempo magazine in 2009 to bridge the gap between the different ethnic communities in the UAE, and to promote innovation, creativity and positive values. Bagersh founded The Dream Players in 2002 to support performing arts.

Bagersh chaired the Women in Business Committee of the American Chamber of Commerce (AmCham) in Abu Dhabi for two years, until July 2015. She helped found and deploy "Women Achieve", an initiative that mandates signing companies empower women staff and nurture them into leadership positions. Women Achieve was signed and adopted by multinationals such as Boeing, Lockheed Martin, Louis Berger, Raytheon, Accenture, Parsons and others. Bagersh is currently board member at AmCham Abu Dhabi, and is chair of its Arts and Culture Committee.

Bagersh worked at the Higher Colleges of Technology as their Director of Communication until February 2016. She was replaced by Abdulla Al Hosani who heads the Communication Department at Higher Colleges of Technology now.

In April 2015, BrandMoxie launched The Smovies – a short film competition platform, with the strategic partnership of VOX Cinemas UAE.

== Awards ==
- Aflam Qaseera film script writing competition in 2011, and received a grant for a short film script that she wrote, and later went on to produce in the following year. The film “The Journey” won Special Jury Prize at The 2012 Abu Dhabi Film Festival, and toured in other festivals.
- The National Short Fiction Competition in 2009 for 'Child Bride', in the Biz Globe by Newzglobe.com in 2010
- Best Woman Contribution in Regional Business & Trade Development in the 3rd Middle East Women's Achievement Awards in 2004
- Woman of the Year Awards 2015, Achievers Nominee by Emirates Woman Magazine
- Woman in Business Award, AmCham Abu Dhabi 2016 Excellence Awards

== Personal life ==
Bagersh is an American national, and is married to Ali Bukair, a structural engineer and building code expert. The family lives in Abu Dhabi, UAE, where Bagersh is CEO of BrandMoxie advertising agency, which is based at twofour54 in Abu Dhabi, and oversees BrandMoxie's other commercial and CSR assets. These include Tempo magazine, Tamakkan, The Dream Players, and The Smovies.
