= List of research centers at Boston College =

The following is a list of Research centers at Boston College.

== Research centers and institutes ==
- Boisi Center for Religion and American Public Life
- Business Institute
- Center for Asset Management
- Center for Child, Family, and Community Partnerships (CCFCP)
- Center for Christian-Jewish Learning
- Center for Corporate Citizenship (CCC)
- Center for East Europe, Russia, and Asia
- Center for Human Rights and International Justice
- Center for Ignatian Spirituality
- Center for International Higher Education
- Center for Investment and Research Management
- Center for Irish Programs Dublin
- Center for Nursing Research
- Center for Retirement Research
- Center for the Study of Home and Community Life
- Center for Study of Testing, Evaluation, and Educational Policy (CSTEEP)
- Center for Work and Family (CWF)
- Center on Aging & Work - Workplace Flexibility
- Center on Wealth and Philanthropy (CWP, formerly SWRI)
- Church in the 21st Century Center
- Clough Center for the Study of Constitutional Democracy
- EagleEyes Project
- Institute for Medieval Philosophy and Theology
- Institute of Religious Education and Pastoral Ministry (IREPM)
- Institute for Administrators in Catholic Higher Education
- Institute for Scientific Research
- Institute for the Study and Promotion of Race and Culture (ISPRC)
- International Study Center
- Irish Institute
- Jesuit Institute
- Lifelong Learning Institute
- Lonergan Institute
- Mathematics Institute
- Media Research and Action Project
- Presidential Scholars Program
- Sloan Work and Family Research Network
- Small Business Development Center
- Urban Ecology Institute
- Weston Observatory
- Winston Center for Leadership and Ethics
- Women's Resource Center
