= Di Dongsheng =

Chinese academic

- 翟东升
- Born: 1976 (age 49–50); Qidong, Nantong, China
- Education: Renmin University (LLB, LLM, LLD)
- Occupations: Professor, Academic, Policy Adviser
- Years active: 1999-Present
- Employer(s): Tsinghua Centre for International Security and Strategy (CISS), China Foreign Strategic Research Center (Secretary General)
- Organization: Silk Road School (丝路学院) Institute of International Monetary Studies
- Title: Vice Dean
- Political party: Chinese Communist Party

Di Dongsheng (Chinese: 翟东升; pinyin: Dí Dōngshēng, born 1976) is a Chinese international relations scholar. He currently serves as professor and vice dean of the School of International Relations of the Renmin University of China.

Di is also a senior research fellow at the International Monetary Institute of RUC and a member of the Centre for International Security and Strategy (CISS) at Tsinghua University, a think tank closely affiliated with the International Liaison Department of the Chinese Communist Party, the Ministry of Industry and Information Technology, and the Ministry of Foreign Affairs.

== Career ==
Di received a Bachelor of Law, a Master of Law, and a Doctor of Law in international relations, all from the Renmin University of China. Di was a visiting scholar or part-time lecturer at Sciences Po, Vrije Universiteit Brussel, Boston University Brussels, and Georgetown University.

Di's research interests include the international political economy of money and financial systems, China's economic foreign relations, and the political economy of the United States. Since 1999, he has published a number of scholarly articles in both Chinese and English.

== Public speech ==
In a public speech on November 28, 2020, Di allegedly boasted before a live audience about China's influence in America's "core inner circle of power", especially in relation to the incoming administration of president-elect Joe Biden, saying "Biden is back! Our old friend is back!" Di, who was speaking at an event hosted by the Chinese nationalistic video channel Guan Video (官视频), bragged about Beijing's sway over Wall Street and Biden's son Hunter, whose previous business dealings in China had recently come under scrutiny.

In the last three to four decades, we had been utilizing our influence within America's core inner circle of power. As I said before, since the 1970's Wall St exerted strong influence over the foreign and domestic affairs of the United States. Therefore we had a channel we could rely on. But the problem is after 2008, the status of Wall St declined, more importantly, after 2016 Wall St couldn't touch Trump, they had no influence over him.

[...] Why is it that between 1992 and 2016, no matter what kind of crisis occurred the US and China were able to resolve all kinds of issues?...It’s because we have people at the top. At the top of America’s core inner circle of power and influence, we had our old friends [audience laughter]

[…] Now with the election of the Biden administration, the traditional elites, the political elites, the establishment, they have a very close relationship with Wall St.

[...] Trump has been saying that Biden’s son has some sort of global foundation [audience laughter], have you noticed that? Who helped him establish the foundation? Got it? There are a lot of horse trading within these affairs [audience laughter]. Then, so, at such a times, we use an appropriate way to express some goodwill.

— Di Dongsheng (翟东升) on November 28, 2020

The video of the speech went viral on Chinese social media but was quickly censored and deleted by Chinese officials. It was also the subject of much controversy overseas, attracting the attention of outlets such as Fox News, New York Post and South China Morning Post. The video was cited by journalist and writer Glenn Greenwald as evidence of the influence by the Chinese Communist Party (CCP) within the Biden administration through familial connections. A segment of the video of Di's speech was also shared by US President Donald Trump on Twitter.

Li Hengqing, director of Information & Strategy Institute, a Washington, D.C. think tank, told Radio Free Asia that Di's speech attracted the attention of the US political establishment, and it was reportedly translated into English and circulated among government agencies. Li said that Di's remarks exposed the CCP's political corruption model, which is "using money to create guanxi".

== Works ==
=== Books ===
- Dongsheng, Zhai (Di); Lun, Wei (2015). Great Power Currencies: International Currencies and Currency Internationalization (in Chinese). Beijing: Peking University Press. ISBN 9787301254813.
- Dongsheng, Zhai (Di) (2019). Money, Power and People: The Humanistic Political Economy of the Global Monetary and Financial System (in Chinese). Beijing: Chinese Social Sciences Press. ISBN 9787520344029.
- Dongsheng, Zhai (Di) (2019). Why China has a Future (in Chinese) (3rd ed.). Mechanical Industry Press. ISBN 9787111628330.
- Dongsheng, Zhai (Di) (2021). Parallel Competition (in Chinese). Beijing: Oriental Publishing House. ISBN 9787520722353.
