= BrandMoxie =

UAE marketing and advertising agency

- Company type: Private
- Industry: Advertisement, Marketing, Digital Services
- Headquarters: Abu Dhabi
- Key people: Owner (Manal al Minhali), Sana Bagersh (CEO)

BrandMoxie is an advertising and marketing agency based in Abu Dhabi, United Arab Emirates. Founded in 2004, the company provides marketing and branding services and runs several community and media initiatives, including the Tamakkan entrepreneurship platform, Tempo magazine and the Smovies short film competition.

== History and operations ==
BrandMoxie was established in 2004 as an advertising and marketing agency that offers strategy consulting, branding, advertising and campaign implementation services to corporate clients. The company is headquartered in Abu Dhabi and has been noted for linking its commercial work with community outreach and corporate social responsibility programmes.

== Initiatives ==
=== Tamakkan ===
In June 2009 BrandMoxie established Tamakkan, an entrepreneurship, innovation and leadership platform aimed at supporting small and medium-sized enterprises (SMEs) in the UAE. Tamakkan organises regular free seminars and workshops on topics such as business planning, marketing and technology, and is staffed by BrandMoxie employees and volunteers.

=== Tempo magazine ===
In August 2009 the agency launched Tempo (originally Abu Dhabi Tempo), a community magazine that publishes arts, culture and human-interest stories from the UAE. The magazine has experimented with mobile tagging technology, using Microsoft Tag codes to link printed content to online material.

=== The Smovies ===
In April 2015 BrandMoxie launched The Smovies, a short film competition platform created in partnership with Vox Cinemas. The competition invites filmmakers to submit films of around one minute, with winning entries screened in Vox cinemas across the UAE. Later seasons have focused on specific themes such as cinema etiquette and climate change, including a 2019 edition organised with the UAE Ministry of Climate Change and Environment.

=== Abu Dhabi International Poetry Festival ===
BrandMoxie has also been involved in literary events. In 2015 it collaborated with the spoken-word collective Rooftop Rhythms and Sorbonne University Abu Dhabi to establish the Abu Dhabi International Poetry Festival, hosted at Sorbonne's campus in Abu Dhabi.

== See also ==
- Sana Bagersh
- Tamakkan
- The Smovies
