= Tamakkan =

Entrepreneurship organization

- Formation: 2009
- Founder: Sana Bagersh
- Type: entrepreneurship organization
- Headquarters: Abu Dhabi, UAE
- Services: Offers guidance, seminars, and networking opportunities to SMEs
- Website: https://tamakkan.org/

Tamakkan, which means "empower yourself" in Arabic, is an entrepreneurship organization based in Abu Dhabi, UAE, that offers guidance, seminars, and networking opportunities to SMEs. Tamakkan was founded in 2009 by Sana Bagersh and operates in partnership with Aldar Properties and under the patronage of the Fatima Bint Hazza Cultural Foundation.

== Foundation ==
Tamakkan was established to provide a platform that allows entrepreneurs and start-ups seeking business advice and tools for development.

Tamakkan holds free monthly seminars at the Mamoura Auditorium in Abu Dhabi. The seminars focus on business fundamentals like developing business and marketing plans, branding, segmentation, franchising, merchandising, social media, and so on.

Tamakkan provides access related to information and networking, as well as promoting innovation, best practices, and corporate social responsibility to corporations and institutions. This initiative has grown into an informative and reliable tool aimed at fostering the sharing of knowledge and as a training platform that contributes to the development of the local economy. It aims at nurturing entrepreneurship, encouraging strategic goal-setting and standard business practices as well as helping SMEs to benchmark against the best in their field.

== Initiatives ==
Tamakkan's monthly seminars offer a wide spectrum of guidance to entrepreneurs on topics ranging from financing, marketing, and product development, all the way to international business expansion, integrating new technologies, and the importance of maintaining health and balance.

Tamakkan supports young Emirati entrepreneurs by providing them with industry insights in order to achieve their business dreams. It also launched an Entrepreneur Free Advice Program where entrepreneurs are able to get guidance and instantaneous answers to their questions, from participating experts who offer legal advice in addition to consulting on financing, marketing, branding, sales, life balance and other issues of concern to small and medium size enterprises (SMEs).

Tamakkan also facilitates discussions on issues such as gender differences in areas such as negotiations. It raises awareness about key differences while negotiating, between men and women, and offered solutions to help individuals identify and mitigate weaknesses. It emphasized how to go about getting what they deserve, regardless of gender barriers.

Corporate Bootcamp is a series of training workshops designed to improve business skills, all the while supporting best practices and international standards. This was designed for private and public enterprises and includes fundamental skills required to successfully operate a business. The workshops cover the foundation of business, allowing them to achieve peak fitness for their operational growth. This ensures that business owners have the essential skill set to achieve sustainability and success, as well as profitability through service skills, quality management and marketing.

Tamakkan's seminars are centered on the digital influence and its impact on businesses, thus helping entrepreneurs take advantage of social media and technology innovations such as iBeacon, Oculus Rift, Augmented Reality, and social marketing.

The short Tamakkan Grow courses were created to address the demand for a more substantive educational and informational platform. The courses focus on social marketing tools for small businesses as well as a case study presentation of the online business success story Newzglobe.com, featuring its CEO and Founder Meraj Syed.

== Partners ==
- Mubadala GE Capital
- AmCham
- Fatima Bint Hazza Cultural Foundation
- London Speaker Bureau
- SERCO
- INSEAD
- Boston University's Brussels Campus, Dubai and Abu Dhabi, UAE
