= Institute for Geriatric Social Work =

The Institute for Geriatric Social Work (IGSW) - now CADER - is an American not-for-profit, non-membership organization serving the fast-growing geriatric social work field. Affiliated with Boston University, CADER has become a national leader in providing social workers with the practice skills they will need to serve America’s growing population of older adults. Central to this mission have been CADER’s education and training initiatives, which employ online and face-to-face training methods to reach individual practitioners and social services agencies that seek convenient, accessible, high-quality and low-cost training. Through these and future programs, IGSW intends to improve the quality and effectiveness of continuing professional education for social services practitioners for years to come.

IGSW was founded in 2002 by its director, Scott Miyake Geron, PhD, who also serves as an associate professor at Boston University School of Social Work, a leading center for education in geriatric social services. The creation of the Institute was funded through a five-year, $5.12 million grant from the Atlantic Philanthropies. Continuation funding has also been provided by Atlantic in the form of a $720,000 bridge grant and a second five-year grant for $3.1 million, which was awarded late in 2008.

A key source of credibility for CADER is its affiliation with Boston University and specifically with the Boston University School of Social Work.

CADER is now led by Director Bronwyn Keefe.

In October 2012, the University of Boston announced that The Institute for Geriatric Social Work would be renamed to The Center for Aging and Disability Education and Research at Boston University (CADER).
