= The Smovies =

The Smovies (Short + Movies) is a film competition created in Abu Dhabi, UAE in April 2015 by BrandMoxie.

== Guidelines ==
The shortlisted videos are shown on the Smovies website. The Smovies team selects an expert panel of judges who choose the winners each season. The winning and short-listed videos are showcased at various events and during the awarding ceremony. The winners are announced at the end of every season.

=== Season 1 ===
The first season was launched on April 1, 2015 and ended in June. The season was titled #plsdontstealmyshow in an attempt to raise awareness about movie watching etiquette. VOX Cinemas took this opportunity to enlighten movie goers about cinema etiquette and to create the best cinema-going experience in the region. Participants were asked to create an ad for the campaign which was then shown across their screens.

There were 27 short-listed films:

1. A Spartan Surprise
2. The Epiphany
3. Please Don't Steal My Show
4. You Are Not Alone
5. Sameer Antulay
6. Nonsense
7. TV Watching
8. I Want To Enjoy It Too!
9. Not Cool
10. What Do You Prefer?
11. Don't Kill My Moment
12. Switch Off!
13. What Did I Miss?
14. ENOUGH
15. Lightsaber Rage
16. My Feet Smell Sweet
17. Selfie With Ghost
18. Calls Ruin Movies
19. Show Stealers
20. Seeing Double
21. Who Has My Daughter?
22. Don't Steal My Show- Sparsh Srivastava
23. The Laptop
24. Gamer Guy
25. Book Reading
26. What Did I Miss?
27. Smovie by Hammad

First place went to A Spartan Surprise by Faisal Hashmi. Second place went to The Epiphany by Shezah Salam, and third place went to Please Don't Steal My Show by Vimin Thomas.

=== Season 2 ===
The second season was titled The Message and lead to the hashtag #smoviesmessage. This edition ran from June to September 2015 and focused on conveying a message regarding social consciousness, and fell under the narrative category.
