= Boston College Eagles sports radio network =

Collegiate sports radio network

The Boston College Eagles sports radio network broadcasts Boston College Eagles games on AM, FM, and satellite radio. The sports teams covered include Boston College Eagles football, men's ice hockey, and Boston College men's basketball. The broadcasts are available nationwide via Sirius XM Satellite Radio.

Historically they were broadcast on 15 stations (10 A.M., 5 F.M.) heard across six New England states.

== Radio affiliates ==
Station	Frequency	City	Format	Sports carried	Notes
WPOP	1410	Hartford, Connecticut	Sports	Football	
WJJB-FM	96.3	Gray, Maine	Sports	Football, basketball	
WRED	1440	Westbrook, Maine	Sports	Football, basketball	
WEEI	850	Boston, Massachusetts	Sports	Football, men's basketball, men's ice hockey, baseball	Co-flagship of the football & basketball networks with WRKO.
WRKO	680	Boston, Massachusetts	News/Talk	Football, basketball	Co-flagship of the football & basketball networks with WEEI/WEEI-FM.
WWEI	105.5	Easthampton, Massachusetts	Sports	Football, basketball	
WPKZ	1280	Fitchburg, Massachusetts	News/Sports	Football, Men's Basketball	
W287BT	105.3	Fitchburg, Massachusetts	News/Sports	Football, Men's Basketball	Translator for WPKZ.
WEEI-FM	93.7	Lawrence, Massachusetts	Sports	Football, basketball	Simulcast of football & basketball co-flagship WEEI.
WMRC	1490	Milford, Massachusetts	Classic hits	Football, basketball	
W267CD	101.3	Milford, Massachusetts	Classic hits	Football, basketball	Translator for WMRC.
WVEI	1440	Worcester, Massachusetts	Sports (WEEI network)	Football, basketball	
WTPL	107.7	Hillsborough, New Hampshire	News/Talk	Football, basketball	
WGAM	1250	Manchester, New Hampshire	Sports	Football, basketball	
W278CJ	103.5	Manchester, New Hampshire	Sports	Football, basketball	Translator for WGAM.
WGHM	900	Nashua, New Hampshire	Sports	Football, basketball	
WVMT	620	Burlington, Vermont	News/Talk	Football, basketball	

== Former affiliates (4 stations) ==
- WARL 1320: Attleboro, Massachusetts (2006 & 2009)
- WCRN 830: Worcester, Massachusetts (2010)
- WTSA 1450: Brattleboro, Vermont (2009)
- WVEI-FM 103.7: Westerly, Rhode Island
