= Boston College Eagles ice hockey =

Boston College Eagles ice hockey may refer to:

- Boston College Eagles men's ice hockey
- Boston College Eagles women's ice hockey
