= Flag of Boston =

Official flag of the U.S. capital of Boston

Boston
- Use: Civil flag
- Proportion: 7:10
- Adopted: January 29, 1917; 109 years ago
- Designed by: Boston Columbus Day Committee

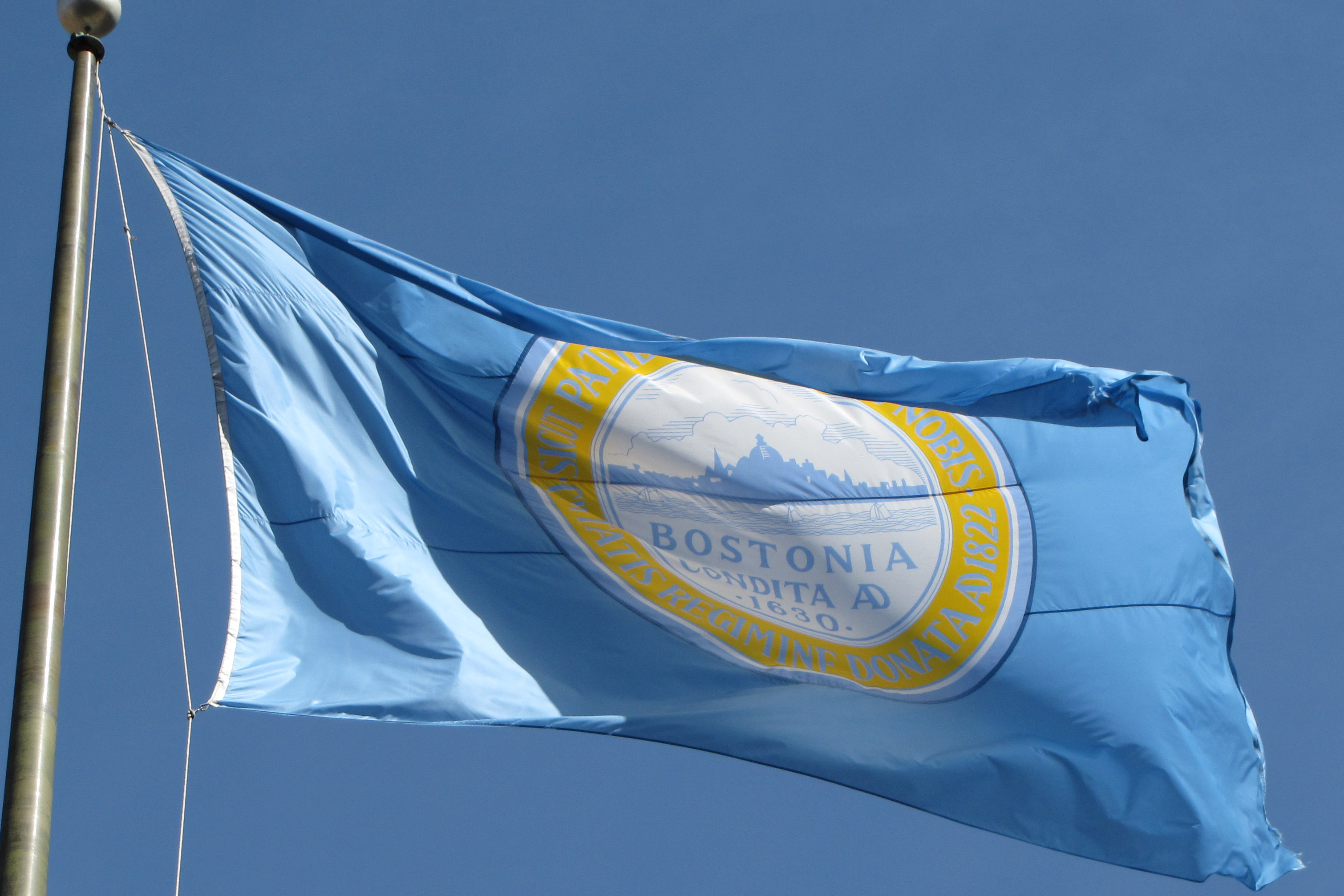
Municipal flag of Boston waving

The flag of Boston consists of a sky blue field and the seal of the city of Boston, Massachusetts, United States, in the center. The flag is sometimes flown in a darker shade of blue, more of a turquoise. It was designed in 1913 and adopted by the Boston City Council on January 29, 1917.

== History ==
The city flag was originally used in the 1913 Columbus Day celebration and other holidays in an unofficial capacity for three years until it was officially adopted by the city government on January 29, 1917.

The flag uses the city seal, which was designed in 1823 and officially adopted in 1914. The motto contained within the seal are the Latin words SICUT PATRIBUS SIT DEUS NOBIS, meaning "God be with us as he was with our fathers". Elsewhere in the seal are BOSTONIA CONDITA -1630- "Boston founded in AD 1630" and CIVITATIS REGIMINE DONATA 1822 "city incorporated in AD 1822" denoting the foundation and incorporation of the city respectively.

The flag placed 133rd out of 150 city flags in a 2004 survey by the North American Vexillological Association, based on appearance. It is commonly categorized by vexillologists as a "seal on a bed sheet".

== Use ==
The city's website describes the shade used on the field as "Continental blue". The proportions of the flag are 7:10. The code specifies that the flag is to be flown at Boston City Hall and at Boston Common. It is also flown at private locations within and around the city. When used, the flag is supposed to have a gold fringe. However, it can be inferred that this is only for indoor use of the flag.

== Municipal standard ==
Boston's city ordinance to make a city flag also made a "municipal standard". This flag's obverse is the same as the city flag, besides the addition of a buff stripe on three sides. The reverse of this flag has a seal displaying the "trimountain", the original three hills Boston was built on.
