= History of the Boston Celtics =

Sports team history

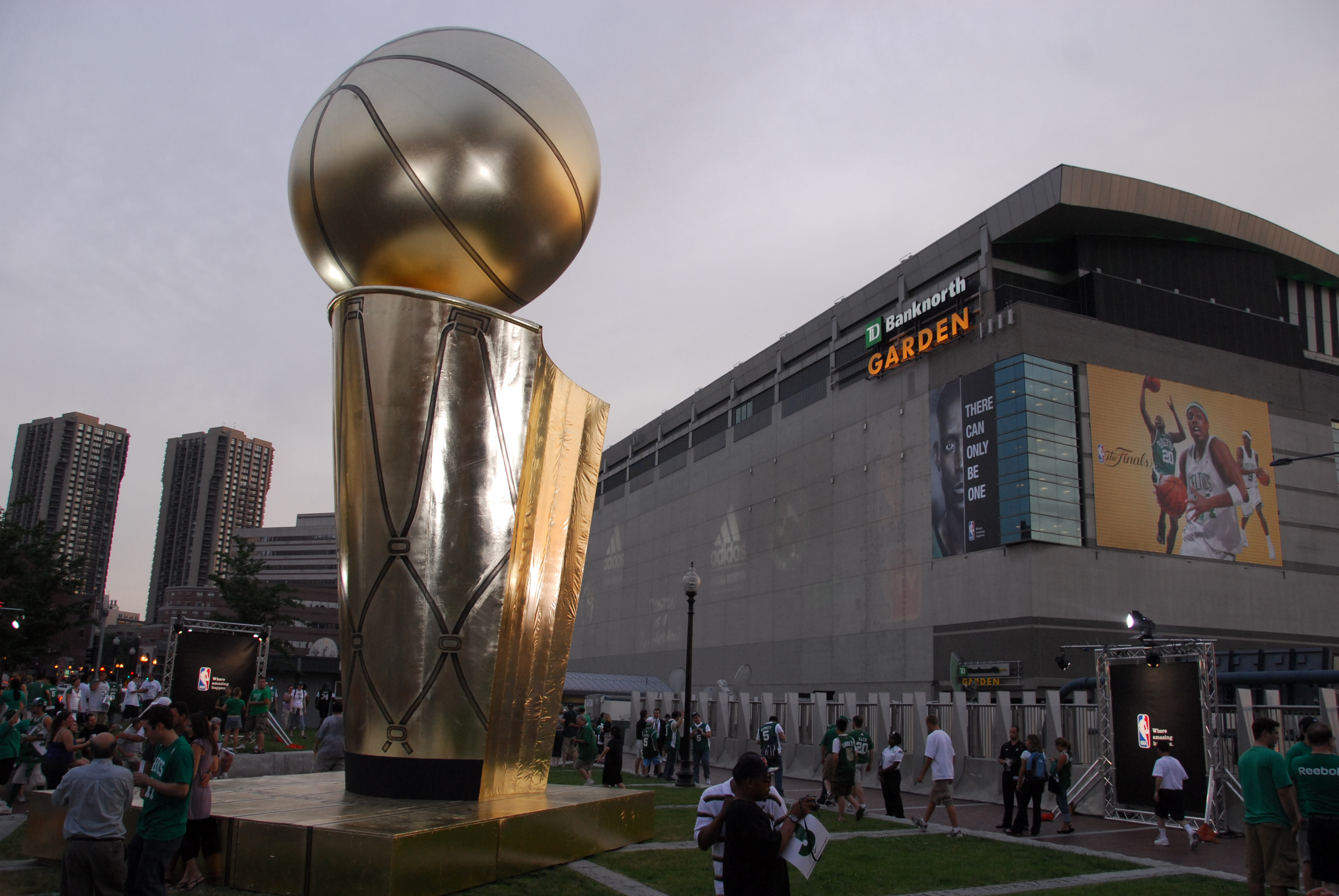
The TD Garden, seen here during the 2008 NBA Finals, has been the Celtics' arena since 1995.

The Boston Celtics are an American professional basketball team based in Boston. Founded in 1946 as a charter member of the Basketball Association of America, the Celtics then moved into the National Basketball Association (NBA) in 1949, as said league was formed by the merger of the BAA and the National Basketball League. Currently playing in the Atlantic Division of the Eastern Conference, the Celtics have the most NBA titles with 18 championships. Eleven of those occurred between 1957 and 1969, with a dynasty led by center Bill Russell and coach/general manager Red Auerbach. The Celtics won two more titles in the 1970s under coach Tom Heinsohn, and three more in the 1980s under the leadership of forward Larry Bird. After a 22-year drought, the Celtics got a title in 2008, and then another in 2024.

== 1946–1956: Building the dynasty ==
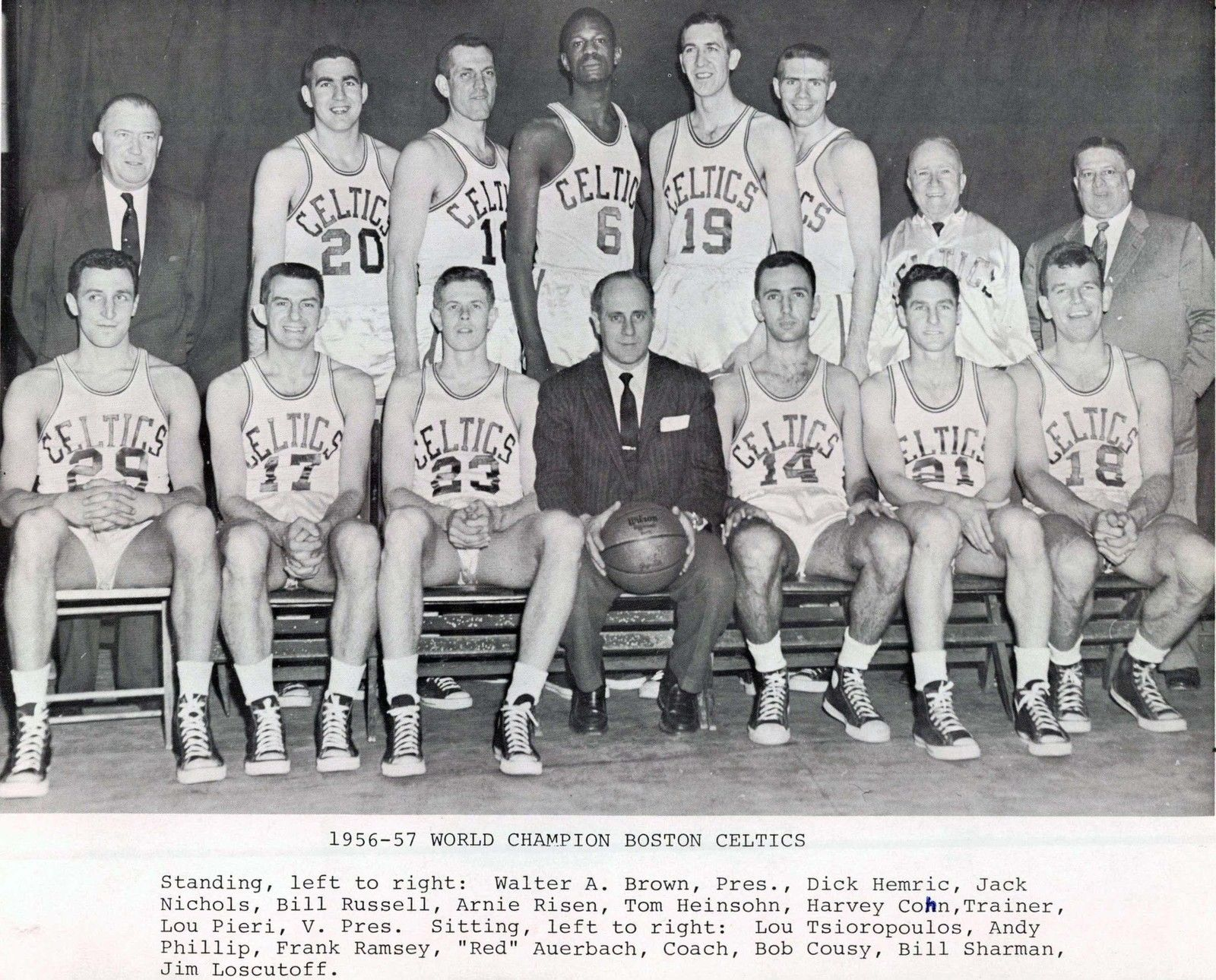
The 1956–57 team that won the first championship for the franchise

The Celtics were formed in 1946 as a team in the Basketball Association of America, and became part of the National Basketball Association after the merger of the BAA and the National Basketball League to form the NBA in the fall of 1949. In 1950, the Celtics became the first franchise to draft an African American player, signing Chuck Cooper.

The Celtics had struggled during their early years, but the hiring of Coach Red Auerbach would change their fortunes. One of the first major players to join the Celtics was Bob Cousy, whom Auerbach initially refused to draft. Cousy eventually became the property of the Chicago Stags. When that franchise went bankrupt, Cousy was acquired by the Celtics in a dispersal draft. He would become a huge part of the Celtics' success and eventually became good friends with his new coach. Under Auerbach the Celtics improved dramatically, becoming a consistent threat to win in the NBA's Eastern Division in each of his first six seasons, although they fell short each time.

After the 1955–56 season, Auerbach made a stunning trade. He sent perennial All-Star Ed Macauley to the St. Louis Hawks along with the draft rights to Cliff Hagan in exchange for the Hawks' first round draft pick, the second overall. After negotiating with the Rochester Royals, Auerbach used the pick to select University of San Francisco center Bill Russell. Auerbach also acquired Holy Cross standout, and 1957 NBA Rookie of the Year, Tommy Heinsohn. Russell and Heinsohn worked extraordinarily well with Cousy, and they were the players around whom Auerbach would build the Celtics for more than a decade. Russell, who delayed joining until the middle of the 1957 season in order to play for the U.S. Olympic Team, had an immediate impact.

== 1957–1969: The Bill Russell era ==
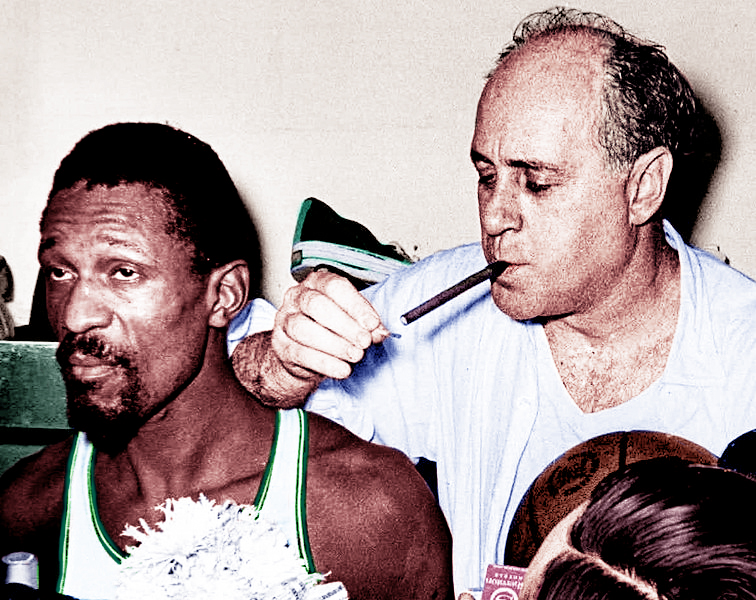
Bill Russell and Red Auerbach won 11 titles with the Celtics; Auerbach was the general manager and coached the first 9 titles, while center Russell served as player-coach in the last two championships.

Russell joined the Celtics in December 1956 and went on to play almost every game during which the Celtics advanced to the NBA Finals and defeated the St. Louis Hawks in seven games, giving the Celtics the first of their record 18 NBA Championships. In 1958, the Celtics again advanced to the NBA Finals, this time losing to the Hawks in 6 games. However, with the acquisition of K.C. Jones that year, the Celtics began a dynasty that would last for more than a decade. In 1959, with Cousy at point guard, Russell at center and Heinsohn at forward, the Celtics won the NBA Championship after sweeping the Minneapolis Lakers. Still coached by Auerbach, the Celtics won seven more consecutive championships, extending their streak to eight in a row. During that timespan, the Celtics met the Lakers in the Finals six times, starting an intense and often bitter rivalry. In 1964, Auerbach made the Celtics the first team to have an all African American starting lineup.

After the 1966 championship, Auerbach retired as coach and Russell took over as player-coach. With his appointment, Russell also became the first African American coach in any sport. Auerbach would remain the general manager, a position he would hold well into the 1980s. However, that year the Celtics' string of NBA titles was broken as they lost to the Philadelphia 76ers in the Eastern Conference finals. The aging team managed two more championships in 1968 and 1969, defeating the Lakers each time in the NBA Finals. Russell retired after the 1969 season, effectively ending a dominant Celtics dynasty that had garnered 11 NBA titles in 13 seasons. The streak of 8 consecutive NBA championships is the longest streak of consecutive championships in U.S. professional sports history. Other important players during this era included Sam Jones, John Havlicek, Bill Sharman, Frank Ramsey, and Satch Sanders.

Despite being the dominant team of the late '50s and most of the 1960s, the Celtics were never a big draw averaging only around 8,500 fans per game. The only times they averaged 10,000 fans per game was in the 1956-57 (Bill Russell's rookie season; 10,517) and the 1966-67 (Russell's first year as player-coach; 10,409) seasons. In contrast, the Celtics fellow tenants of Boston Garden, the Boston Bruins, drew on average around 12,000 fans per game despite being a losing team for the majority of that era.

== 1970–1978: Rebuilding the dynasty ==
The 1970 season was a rebuilding year, as the Celtics had their first losing record since the 1949–50 season, the year prior to Auerbach's arrival. However, with the acquisition of Dave Cowens, Paul Silas, and Jo Jo White, the Celtics soon became dominant again. After losing in the Eastern Conference finals in 1972, the Celtics regrouped and came out determined in 1973 and posted an excellent 68–14 regular season record. But the season ended in disappointment, as they were upset in 7 games by the New York Knicks in the Conference Finals and became the team with the best record ever to have failed to make the Finals. The Celtics returned to the playoffs the next year, defeating the Milwaukee Bucks in the NBA Finals in 1974 for their 12th NBA Championship. The teams split the first four games, and after the Celtics won Game 5 in Milwaukee they headed back to Boston leading three games to two, with a chance to claim the title on their home court. However, the Bucks won Game 6 when Kareem Abdul-Jabbar nestled in a hook shot with three seconds left in the game's second overtime, and the series returned to Milwaukee. But Cowens was the hero in Game 7, scoring 28 points, as the Celtics brought the title back to Boston for the first time in five years. In 1976, the team won yet another championship, defeating the Phoenix Suns in 6 games. The Celtics advanced to the 1976 NBA Finals, which featured one of the greatest games in the history of the NBA. With the series tied at two games apiece, the Suns trailed early in the Boston Garden, but came back to force overtime. In double overtime, a Gar Heard turn-around jumper at the top of the key sent the game to a third overtime, at which point the Celtics prevailed. Tommy Heinsohn coached the team for those two championships. After the 1976 championship and a playoff appearance in 1977, Boston went into another phase of rebuilding.

In the 1977 NBA draft, the Celtics drafted a young forward from the UNC Charlotte named Cedric Maxwell. Maxwell did not contribute much in his rookie season, but he showed promise. Auerbach's job became even tougher following a horrible 1977–78 in which they went 32–50 as John Havlicek, the Celtics All-Time leading scorer, retired after 16 seasons.

== 1979–1992: The Larry Bird era ==
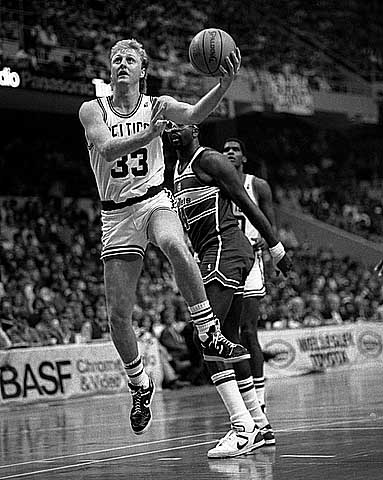
Larry Bird got the Celtics to five finals and three championships in the 1980s.

Thanks to a trade and their poor record in 1977–78, the Celtics owned two of the top eight picks in the 1978 NBA draft. Since the Celtics had two draft choices, Auerbach took a risk and selected junior Larry Bird of Indiana State with the 6th pick, knowing that Bird would elect to remain in college for his senior year. The Celtics would retain his rights for one year, a rule that was later changed, and Auerbach believed that Bird's potential would make him worth the wait. Auerbach also felt that when the college season ended the Celtics would have a great chance to sign Bird. Auerbach was right and Bird signed soon after leading Indiana State to the NCAA Championship game, where they fell to a Michigan State University team that was led by Magic Johnson.

Prior to the 1978–79 season, the Celtics changed ownership, as Irv Levin was looking to move to his native California, and entered an arrangement with John Y. Brown, Jr., who at the time was the owner of the Buffalo Braves. Brown traded ownership of the Braves for Levin's stake in the Celtics, thus allowing Brown to remain as a team owner and freeing up Levin to make the move he desired to make. Thus, Brown became the new owner of the Celtics while Levin moved the Braves to San Diego, California, where they became known as the San Diego Clippers. As part of the deal, trades were made between the Braves/Clippers franchise and the Celtics franchise which resulted in many former Braves joining the team. One of these trades led to Brown's first of many ongoing disputes with Auerbach, that where franchise center Bob McAdoo joined the Celtics for three first round draft picks that Auerbach had planned on using for the future rebuilding project he was trying to undertake. The dispute nearly led Auerbach to resign as general manager for a position with the New York Knicks. With public support strongly behind Auerbach, Brown elected to sell the team rather than face the wrath of the city for being the man who drove Red to a hated rival. During his short ownership, Brown orchestrated a trade for Bob McAdoo that Auerbach despised, and the team unraveled. The Celtics would struggle through the season, going 29–53 without Bird. Newcomers Chris Ford, Rick Robey, Cedric Maxwell and Tiny Archibald failed to reverse the team's momentum.

Bird made his NBA debut with the Boston Celtics during the 1979-80 season, one year after being selected in the draft. During this period, team executive Red Auerbach made several roster changes, including trading Bob McAdoo to the Detroit Pistons in exchange for Guard M.L. Carr and two first-round picks in the 1980 NBA Draft. The Celtics also acquired Gerald Henderson from the Continental Basketball Association (CBA). Carr, Archibald, Henderson and Ford formed the team's backcourt alongside frontcourt players Dave Cowens, Cedric Maxwell, and Bird, who won the NBA Rookie of the Year Award that season. Boston improved by 32 wins from the previous year, finishing with a 61-21 record, which at the time represented the largest single-season improvement in NBA History. The Celtics were eliminated by the Philadelphia 76ers in the Eastern Conference Finals.

After the season, Auerbach completed what may be the most lopsided trade in NBA history. Auerbach had been known for stockpiling draft picks, so even after the success of 1979–80 the Celtics had both the 1st and 13th picks in the 1980 NBA draft left over from the M.L. Carr trade. Auerbach saw an opportunity to improve the team immediately, sending the two picks to the Golden State Warriors in exchange for center Robert Parish and the Warriors first-round pick, the 3rd overall. With the draft pick, Auerbach selected University of Minnesota power forward Kevin McHale. The acquisitions along with Bird gave the Celtics three future Hall of Famers, forming a core that became known as the "Big Three" while leading the Celtics to three NBA championships in the 1980s.

The Celtics went 62–20 under coach Bill Fitch in 1980–81, despite losing center Dave Cowens to retirement late in training camp. Once again the Celtics matched up with the 76ers in the Eastern Conference finals. The Celtics fell behind 3 games to 1 before coming back to win a classic 7th game, 91–90. The Celtics went on to capture the 1981 NBA Championship over the Houston Rockets, just two years after Bird had been drafted. Maxwell was named NBA Finals MVP.

The Celtics only reached the Eastern Conference finals in 1982, losing to Philadelphia in 7 games. The following season culminated in an embarrassing second round playoff loss in the 1983 NBA Playoffs to the Milwaukee Bucks, 4 games to 0. Ford had retired after 1982 and Archibald's age, declining skills and injury problems led to his release after the 1982–83. Fitch was fired, and K.C. Jones was named head coach. Archibald was replaced when popular reserve forward Rick Robey, a close friend of Bird, was traded to the Phoenix Suns in exchange for point guard Dennis Johnson, a former Finals MVP himself. With Johnson starting alongside ex-CBA player Gerald Henderson, and former Toronto Blue Jays third baseman Danny Ainge, veterans Quinn Buckner and M.L. Carr coming off the bench, the Celtics once again had the backcourt depth to complement their talented frontline.

In 1983–84 the Celtics would go 62–20 and finally get back to the NBA Finals after a three-year hiatus. In the final, the Celtics came back from a 2–1 deficit to defeat the Los Angeles Lakers, winning their 15th championship. Bird renewed his college rivalry with Lakers star Magic Johnson during this series. After the series the Celtics traded Henderson, whose dramatic steal in game 2 altered the course of the series and gave the Celtics a chance, to the Seattle SuperSonics in exchange for their first-round pick in the 1986 NBA draft.

In 1985, the Lakers and Celtics would meet again, but this time the Lakers would take the championship. During the following offseason the Celtics acquired Bill Walton from the Los Angeles Clippers in exchange for Cedric Maxwell. Walton was a star with the Portland Trail Blazers, but injuries had kept him from living up to expectations. He was also a lifelong Celtics fan and willing to come off the bench, deferring to the three big men already with the team. Walton would be a big part of the Celtics' success in 1986.

In 1985–86 the Celtics fielded one of the best teams in NBA history. The 1986 Celtics won 67 games, going 40–1 at their home, the Boston Garden. Bird won his third consecutive MVP award after having arguably his finest season, and Walton won the Sixth Man of the Year Award. They would win their 16th championship, easily defeating the Houston Rockets in the NBA Finals.

=== Drafting of Len Bias, his death and aftermath ===
Thanks to the 1984 trade of Gerald Henderson and the subsequent fall of the Seattle SuperSonics, at the end of the 1985–86 season, the Celtics not only had the best team in the NBA, but they also had the second overall pick in the 1986 NBA draft. The Celtics drafted Len Bias with the pick and had high hopes for the young University of Maryland star. Fans believed Bias had superstar potential, and that he would be the perfect complement to the aging, but still strong, Celtics. The hope was that his presence would ensure that the franchise would remain a powerhouse after Bird, McHale and Parish retired. However, Bias died 48 hours after he was drafted, after using cocaine at a party and overdosing. Despite the loss of Bias, the Celtics remained competitive in 1986–87, going 59–23 and again winning the Eastern Conference Championship. However, in the Finals the tired, aging, and injured Celtics ran into perhaps the best Los Angeles Lakers team of the decade. The biggest injury was yet another foot injury for Bill Walton, who only played 10 regular season games in 1986–87 after playing 80 games the year before. Walton fought through the injury, playing 12 games (out of 23) in the playoffs, but was not the same player as he was the year before. McHale, Parish and Ainge were also fighting injuries, forcing reserves Darren Daye and Fred Roberts to play larger roles in the series, which the Celtics lost 4 games to 2.

The Celtics started the 1987–88 season without Kevin McHale, who was recovering from a foot injury that had hobbled him in the 1987 playoffs. Bill Walton was also recovering from injury, and while Walton stuck with the franchise for the 1987–88 and 1988–89 seasons, he had played his last game in the NBA in the 1987 NBA Playoffs. The Celtics did add some new players in the 1987 NBA draft. In the first round, the Celtics selected a promising guard/forward out of Northeastern University by the name of Reggie Lewis. The Celtics also added Brad Lohaus in the second round, giving head coach K.C. Jones a few more weapons to choose from.

Jones was not one to play rookies, however, and both Lewis and Lohaus spent much of the 1987–88 season on the bench while Jones continued to play his veterans. The team won another division title, finishing 57–25 and earning home court advantage throughout the playoffs. Jones' reliance on his veterans came back to haunt him in the playoffs, as the Celtics appeared tired and worn down. Danny Ainge had played the most minutes of his career, and Bird's body was starting to wear down after averaging 39 minutes per game. The Celtics struggled to defeat the Atlanta Hawks in the Eastern Conference Semifinals, needed a 20-point 4th quarter from Larry Bird in the decisive game 7 to finally put the Hawks away 118–116. Emotionally and physically drained from the Hawks series, the Celtics fell in the Eastern Conference finals to the Detroit Pistons, 4 games to 2.

After the 1987–88 season, head coach K.C. Jones retired. Jones' teams had had the best regular season record in the Eastern Conference in all five of his seasons as coach. In addition, he led the Celtics to four NBA Finals appearances and two NBA Championships. Jones was replaced as head coach by assistant Jimmy Rodgers.

Rodgers faced immediate trouble in 1988–89 when, 6 games into the season, Bird decided to have surgery to remove bone spurs in both feet. The injury was expected to sideline Bird until well after the All-Star Break, when presumably he would be able to return. However, he was unable to make it back as the Celtics stumbled to a 42–40 record and a first round playoff defeat to the Detroit Pistons.

Bird returned in 1989–90 to play in 75 games and led the Celtics to a 52–30 record. The season was not completely smooth sailing, as second year guard Brian Shaw caused a stir when he held out of the season for a bigger contract, instead playing the entire season in Italy. However, in the playoffs, after winning the first two games of a Best of 5 series against the New York Knicks the Celtics collapsed, losing 3 straight, including the decisive 5th game at the Boston Garden. In the wake of the defeat, Rodgers was fired and replaced by assistant coach (and former Celtic player) Chris Ford.

Under Ford's leadership, the Celtics improved to 56–26 in 1990–91, recapturing the Atlantic Division title even though Bird missed 22 games with a variety of injuries and Parish and McHale's skills had begun to decline. McHale was never the same after playing through the 1987 Finals with a broken foot. Most significant were the developing back problems that hobbled Bird, causing him to miss one playoff game. Reggie Lewis blossomed into a star, and swingman Kevin Gamble provided a consistent scoring presence when Bird was out of the lineup. Shaw returned from Italy and teamed with rookie Dee Brown at the point guard spot. In the playoffs, the Celtics First round series against the Indiana Pacers was highlighted by a climactic game 5 win in the Boston Garden. Bird left the game midway through the second quarter after hitting his head hard on the parquet floor while diving for a loose ball. He sustained a concussion & a broken eye socket, though he returned in the third quarter and electrified the crowd after the Pacers had grabbed the lead. The Celtics won the game behind Bird's 32 points and advanced to the Eastern Conference Semi-finals, where they lost to their longtime nemesis, the Detroit Pistons, 4 games to 2.

In 1992, a late-season rally allowed the Celtics to catch the Knicks and repeat as Atlantic Division champions. The team finished 51–31 and again matched up with the Indiana Pacers in the first round, this time sweeping the series 3 games to 0. In the Eastern Conference Semifinals, the Celtics lost a grueling 7-game series to the Cleveland Cavaliers, 4 games to 3. Due to back problems, Larry Bird played in only 45 of the 82 regular season games, and only 4 of the 10 playoff games.

After thirteen seasons with the club and winning a gold medal in the Barcelona Olympics with the Dream Team, Bird retired in 1992 primarily due to his back injuries.

== 1993–2001: Tragedy and decline ==
At the time of Bird's retirement former Celtics guard Chris Ford was the coach of the Celtics. Twenty-six-year-old Reggie Lewis (out of Boston's Northeastern University) was seen as Bird's successor as the franchise player for the Celtics. In Bird's final season it was Lewis who led the team in scoring, and he made his first All-Star appearance in the 1992 All-Star Game. Lewis, a small forward, fainted during a 1993 first round playoff matchup with the Charlotte Hornets. It was later revealed that Lewis had heart problems, yet he was able to get doctors to clear him for a comeback. He died of a heart attack after participating in a pickup basketball game during the offseason. The Celtics honored his memory during the following season by retiring his number 35.

The team took another hit after the season, as Kevin McHale retired after 13 seasons in the NBA. The Celtics were now down to one member of the "Big Three" for the 1993–94, as well as without Lewis, their captain and young star. The Celtics drafted Acie Earl in the first round of the 1993 NBA draft, and planned on making him Parish's successor in the middle. After missing the playoffs for the first time since 1978–79, the year before Bird joined the franchise, Robert Parish left as a free agent to join the Charlotte Hornets. The time of "Big Three" was officially over.

In 1994, the Celtics hired former player M.L. Carr to be the team's new G.M. In his first draft in charge of the Celtics, he drafted University of North Carolina star Eric Montross with his first round draft pick. The Acie Earl era was already nearing an end, as Montross became the new heir apparent in the paint.

1994–95 was the Celtics final season in the Boston Garden. The Celtics signed the aging Dominique Wilkins as a free agent, and he led the team in scoring with 17.8 PPG. Second-year player Dino Rađa, a power forward from Croatia, added an interior presence to the team that had been lacking in 1993–94. The Celtics made the playoffs, losing to the heavily favored Orlando Magic in 4 games.

In 1995, the Celtics moved from the Boston Garden into the Fleet Center (renamed the TD Banknorth Garden in 2005). Carr fired Chris Ford and took the coaching reins himself. After drafting Providence College star Eric Williams, the Celtics struggled to a 33–49 record. Things got worse in 1996–97 as the Celtics lost a franchise record 67 games, winning only 15 times despite the emergence of 1st-round draft pick Antoine Walker.

=== Pitino years ===
Carr stepped aside to another job in the organization when the Celtics convinced Rick Pitino to join the franchise as the team's president, front office manager, and head coach. Pitino had led the University of Kentucky to an NCAA Championship and was a very successful head coach at the college level, with a short NBA stint with the New York Knicks several years prior. Some controversy was generated when Pitino was given the title of team "President", taking such title away from Red Auerbach (Auerbach, who by 1997 was holding the title in a "ceremonial" way, became the "Vice Chairman of the Board") Unfortunately for the Celtics, Pitino was not the savior everyone expected him to be, although he did acquire several talented young players during his tenure. The Celtics, after going 15–67 in 1996–97, had the best chance at winning the NBA's draft lottery in 1997. Their odds were augmented even further by a 1996 trade that sent Eric Montross to Dallas in exchange for the Mavericks 1st round pick in 1997 (as well as a swap in draft picks in 1996 that allowed the Celtics to move up to select Walker), which gave the Celtics a second lottery pick and more chances to win the coveted first pick. The San Antonio Spurs won the lottery and selected Tim Duncan first overall in the 1997 NBA draft.

The Celtics received the third and sixth picks, and used the picks to select a brand new backcourt through Chauncey Billups and Ron Mercer. Much of the young team that lost 67 games the year before was dismantled: David Wesley and Rick Fox were let go, and Williams was traded to the Denver Nuggets for a pair of second round draft picks. Walter McCarty was also acquired in a trade with the Knicks. The Celtics seemed ready to pair Billups and Mercer with Antoine Walker, the second-year player out of Kentucky who was coming off a solid rookie season. Unfortunately, two of these players would not remain as fixtures on the team in the long term: Billups was sent to the Toronto Raptors by the trade deadline, and Mercer was traded to the Nuggets during his third season. The team still had a promising start, upsetting the defending champions Chicago Bulls at home on opening night, and hard play from the youngsters that led to leaderships in turnovers and steals, improving its victories from 15 to 36 despite many losing streaks.

The following year the Celtics drafted Paul Pierce, a college star who had been expected to be drafted much higher than the Celtics' number 10 pick overall. Pierce had an immediate impact during the lockout-shortened 1998–99 NBA season, being named Rookie of The Month in February as he led the league in steals. However, the team continued to struggle, finishing only fifth in its division with a 19–31 record. The following season, Mercer was sent to the Nuggets in return to Danny Fortson and a returning Eric Williams, who had only played 42 games in two seasons in Colorado following a knee injury. Pitino's promises of improvement still did not realize, with a losing season in 1999–2000 and a bad start to the 2000–01 season that led to record low attendances at the FleetCenter. Eventually Pitino resigned in January 2001, leaving the Celtics in the hands of assistant coach Jim O'Brien, a friend of Pitino's who had followed Pitino to the Celtics. Chris Wallace became the general manager of the team and the title of "Team President" was returned to Red Auerbach.

== 2001–2006: Attempts to rebuild ==
=== Back to contention – O'Brien years ===
Following the resignation of Rick Pitino, the Celtics improved greatly under coach Jim O'Brien. Paul Pierce matured into an NBA star and was ably complemented by Antoine Walker, along with the other role players acquired over the years. The team finished the season going 24–24 under O'Brien (after going 12–22 before Pitino's resignation) and following the 2000–01 season O'Brien was given the job of head coach on a permanent basis. As a result of numerous trades, the Celtics had three picks in the 2001 NBA draft, a luxury that seemed to set the franchise up well for the long term. General Manager Chris Wallace used the picks on Joe Johnson, Joe Forte (a favorite of Red Auerbach) and Kedrick Brown.

The Celtics entered the 2001–02 season with low expectations. The team's success in the latter stages of 2000–01 was largely forgotten, and critics were surprised when the team (along with the New Jersey Nets) surged to the top of the Atlantic Division ahead of teams like the Philadelphia 76ers, who were fresh off a trip to the NBA Finals. A trade at the February trade deadline sent Joe Johnson, who was having an inconsistent rookie season, along with little-used bench players Randy Brown and Milt Palacio to the Phoenix Suns in exchange for Tony Delk and Rodney Rogers. The season salvaged by the trade, the Celtics went on to win 49 games. The 49 victories were the franchises most since 1992, when Larry Bird was still playing, and the Celtics made the playoffs for the first time since 1995.

The Celtics won a hard-fought five-game series with the 76ers in the first round, 3 games to 2. Pierce scored 46 points in the series-clinching blowout at the Fleet Center. In the conference semifinals the Celtics defeated the favored Detroit Pistons 4 games to 1 in a series best remembered for the Celtics low-scoring (66–64) game 3 victory. In their first trip to the Eastern Conference finals since 1988, the Celtics would jump out to a 2–1 series lead over the New Jersey Nets (after rallying from 21 points down in the fourth quarter to win game 3) but would lose the next three games to fall 4 games to 2.

Following their defeat at the hands of the Nets, the Celtics once again overhauled their roster. Gone were Rodney Rogers, who signed with new rival New Jersey as a free agent, Vitaly Potapenko, Kenny Anderson and Joe Forte, who were sent to Seattle in a five-player trade that brought Vin Baker and Shammond Williams to Boston.

In 2003, the Celtics were sold by owner Paul Gaston to Boston Basketball Partners LLC, led by H. Irving Grousbeck, Wycliffe Grousbeck, Steve Pagliuca, Robert Epstein, David Epstein, and John Svenson. The team made it back to the playoffs but were swept by the Nets in the second round, despite bringing Game 4 to double overtime.

Before their elimination, the team hired Danny Ainge to take over the front office, pushing Chris Wallace to another job in the organization. Ainge believed the team had reached its peak and promptly stunned the team by sending Antoine Walker to the Dallas Mavericks (along with Tony Delk). In return, the Celtics received the oft-injured Raef LaFrentz and a first-round draft pick in 2004.

=== Rebuilding anew – Ainge years ===
On the heels of the off-season Walker trade, Ainge continued to dismantle O'Brien's team with a midseason trade that sent Eric Williams, Tony Battie, and struggling Kedrick Brown to Cleveland in exchange for troubled guard Ricky Davis, center Chris Mihm and center Michael Stewart. Reportedly distraught by this trade, O'Brien stepped down during the 2003–04 Season and was replaced by interim coach John Carroll.

Davis proved to be an exciting player, and Welsch an offensive threat from three-point range (albeit an inconsistent one), but neither was capable of playing the tenacious defense that had become a trademark of O'Brien's teams. Vin Baker proved to be not up to the task of playing near his home state of Connecticut; alcoholism forced the Celtics to first suspend him, then void his contract. He played only 37 games for the Celtics in 2004, and 17 more with the New York Knicks in a minor role. The acquisition of LaFrentz also proved problematic, as LaFrentz's chronic knee problems acted up and forced the big man to miss all but 17 games.

Still, with Pierce playing at his usual level, Davis providing a second scoring punch, and occasional help from rookie Marcus Banks at point guard the Celtics prepared for yet another playoff run. In February, the Celtics helped their former nemeses, the Detroit Pistons acquire Rasheed Wallace for their own title run, sending Mike James off to Detroit in exchange for a 1st-round pick as well as Chucky Atkins, who would provide the Celtics with a stabilizing veteran point guard to go with the inconsistent Banks. The Celtics made the playoffs only to be badly swept in the first round by the Indiana Pacers losing all 4 by blowout margins.

Ainge received a lot of criticism for dismantling the previous team, but he attempted to redeem himself in the draft. After selecting Banks and center Kendrick Perkins in 2003, Ainge added high school power forward Al Jefferson, St. Joseph's University standout Delonte West (with the Mavericks pick from the Antoine Walker trade), and the athletic Tony Allen (with the Pistons 1st-round pick acquired in the Atkins-James swap) in 2004. During his second off-season, Ainge was able to unload some payroll when he acquired veterans Gary Payton and Rick Fox from the Los Angeles Lakers in exchange for Mihm, Atkins and bench player Jumaine Jones. Fox retired rather than rejoin the team and Payton threatened to hold out of training camp, but he eventually ended up playing for the team during the 2004–05 Season.

The Celtics were a young team under new coach Doc Rivers, yet they seemed to have a core of good young players, led by rookie Al Jefferson, to go along with a selection of able veterans (Paul Pierce, a now-healthy Raef LaFrentz, and Ricky Davis). Before the trading deadline in the winter of 2005 the Celtics re-acquired Antoine Walker when they dealt Gary Payton to the Atlanta Hawks (Payton would re-sign with the team after being released from the Hawks a week later). With Walker back in the fold, the Celtics improved enormously. The Celtics went 45–37 and won their first Atlantic Division title since 1991–92. The Pacers defeated them in the first round yet again, with the series culminating in an embarrassing 27 point 7th game loss at the Fleet Center.

At the conclusion of the 2004–05 season Payton and Walker both became free agents. Walker was sent to the Miami Heat in a multi-team sign-and-trade deal (the largest trade in NBA history) that brought the Celtics Qyntel Woods and Curtis Borchardt, both of whom would later be released, two future second-round draft picks, the rights to Spanish center Albert Miralles, and cash. Payton later chose to sign with the Heat as well. Ainge brought in a few more young players during the draft, including Gerald Green, Ryan Gomes, and Orien Greene. Ainge also added the veteran Brian Scalabrine, signing Scalabrine to a 5-year/$15 million contract.

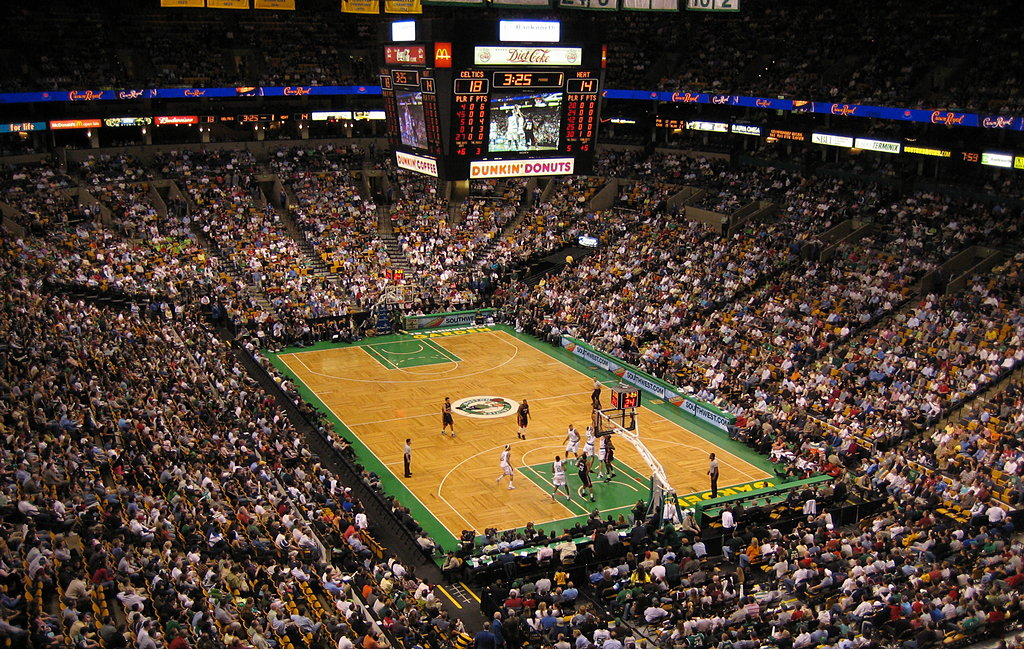
Celtics in a game versus the Miami Heat at the TD Banknorth Garden in April 2006

During the 2005–06 season, Ainge traded Davis, Blount, Banks, Justin Reed, and two conditional second-round draft picks to the Minnesota Timberwolves for forward Wally Szczerbiak, centers Michael Olowokandi and Dwayne Jones, and a first-round pick. Many were skeptical about this decision. However, Ainge stated more than once that he was committed to continuing the rebuilding process under team captain Paul Pierce, who played some of the best basketball of his career in 2006. Despite Pierce's excellence, the Celtics missed the 2006 playoffs with a 33–49 record.

=== 2006 off-season ===
The Boston Celtics continued to rebuild on the night of the 2006 NBA draft. Danny Ainge traded the rights to seventh overall pick Randy Foye, Dan Dickau and Raef LaFrentz to the Portland Trail Blazers in exchange for Sebastian Telfair, Theo Ratliff, and a future second-round pick. A subsequent trade with the Philadelphia 76ers for Allen Iverson was reported as a potential move beneficial to each team, although such a trade never happened and Iverson was shipped to the Denver Nuggets in December. Orien Greene was waived, and the Celtics replaced him by trading a first-round pick in the 2007 NBA draft to the Phoenix Suns for the rights to Rajon Rondo. In the second round the Celtics added Leon Powe to the team, and later signed Villanova star Allan Ray as an undrafted free agent.

=== 2006–07 season ===
The 2006–07 season was a gloomy one for the franchise. The season began with the death of Red Auerbach at the age of 89. Auerbach was one of the few remaining people who had been a part of the NBA since its inception in 1946. The Celtics went 2–22 from late December 2006 through early February 2007 after losing Paul Pierce to injury, the result of a stress reaction in his left foot (he would later miss the latter part of March and all of April because of swelling in his left elbow). At first, the Celtics received a much needed boost from guard Tony Allen but he tore his ACL on a dunk attempt in a game vs. the Indiana Pacers on January 10, 2007. The Celtics recorded a record of 24–58, second-worst in the NBA, including a franchise record 18-game losing streak that lasted from January 5 to February 14. As the streak grew, some suggested that Pierce sit out the rest of the season to the let the young players such as Al Jefferson, Gerald Green, Rajon Rondo and Delonte West get more experience. Green became the second Celtic, joining Dee Brown, to capture the Slam Dunk Contest during All-Star Weekend.

On February 22, 2007, former Celtic Dennis Johnson died at the age of 52. Johnson had been coaching the franchise's NBDL affiliate in Austin, Texas at the time of his death. Johnson was honored at the very next Celtics game, even though it was against the Lakers in Los Angeles. The Celtics also held a special ceremony for him at the Garden on February 28, 2007, before a game against the New York Knicks.

One bright spot of the season happened on St. Patrick's Day against the eventual champions San Antonio Spurs. The Celtics beat the Spurs 91–85, ending the 17-year away drought at San Antonio, as well as the 10-year drought against the Spurs (Boston's first victory against Tim Duncan).

On April 18, the team promoted COO Rich Gotham to president.

== 2007–present: Back to relevance ==
"The Big 3"

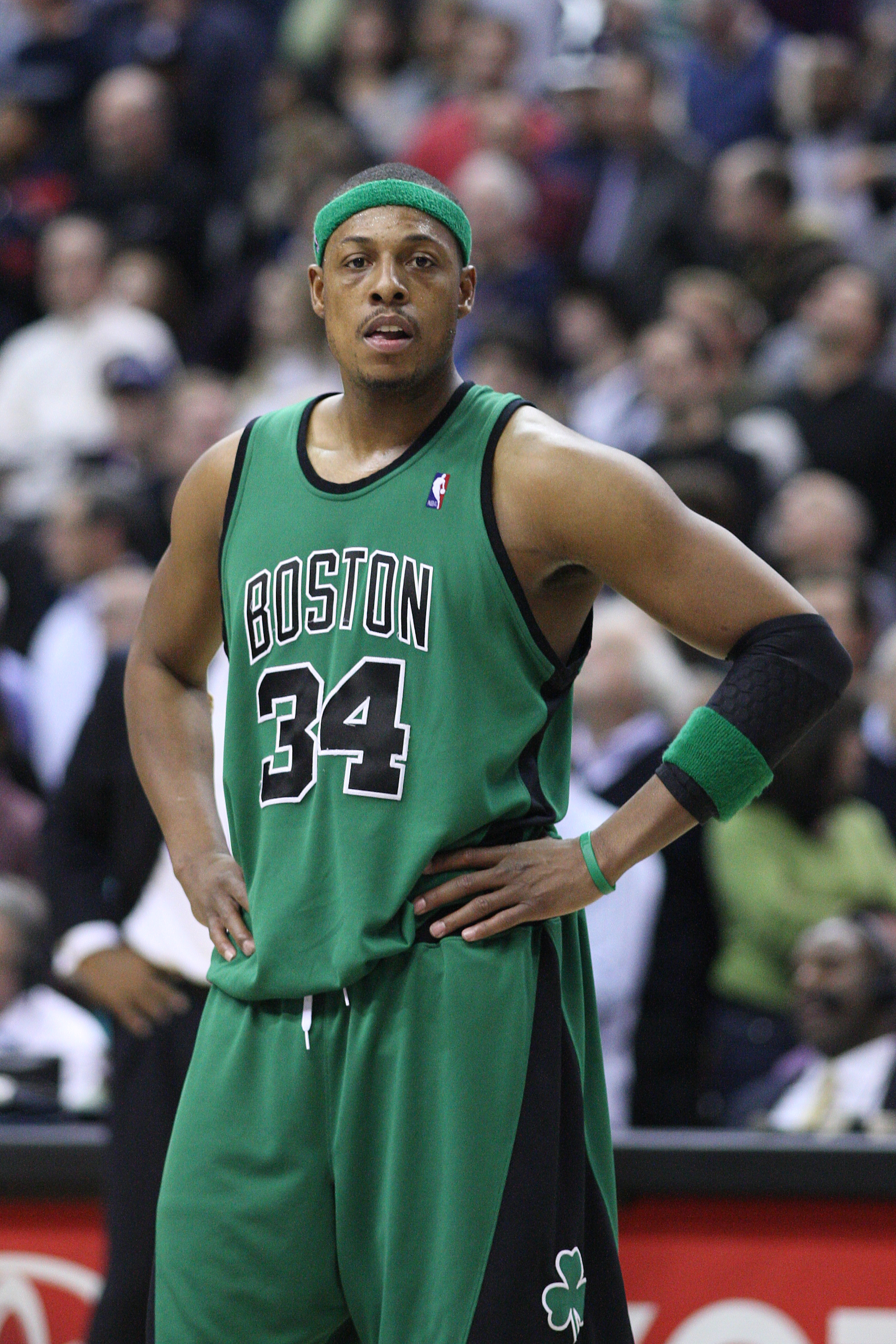
Paul Pierce

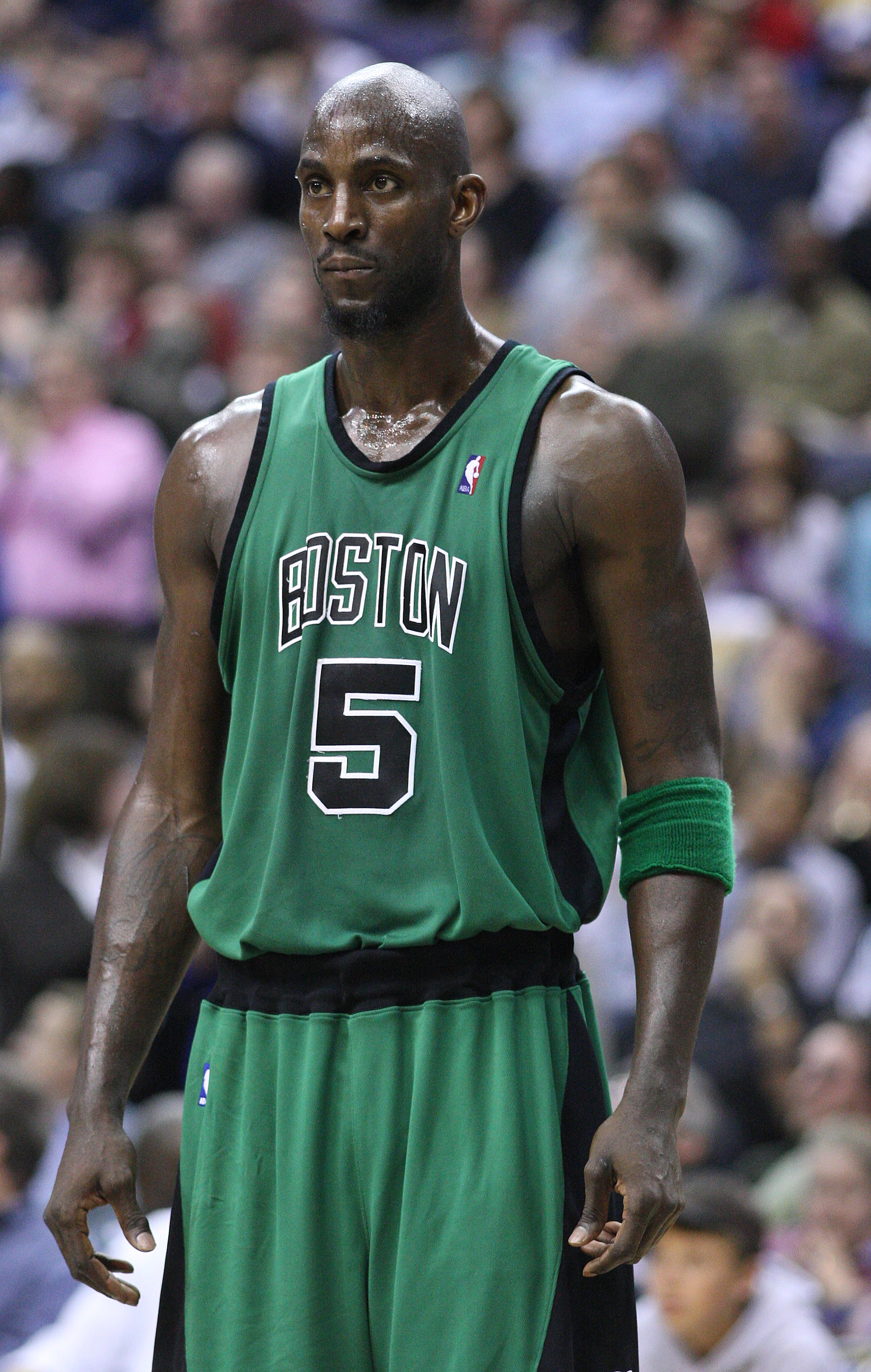
Kevin Garnett

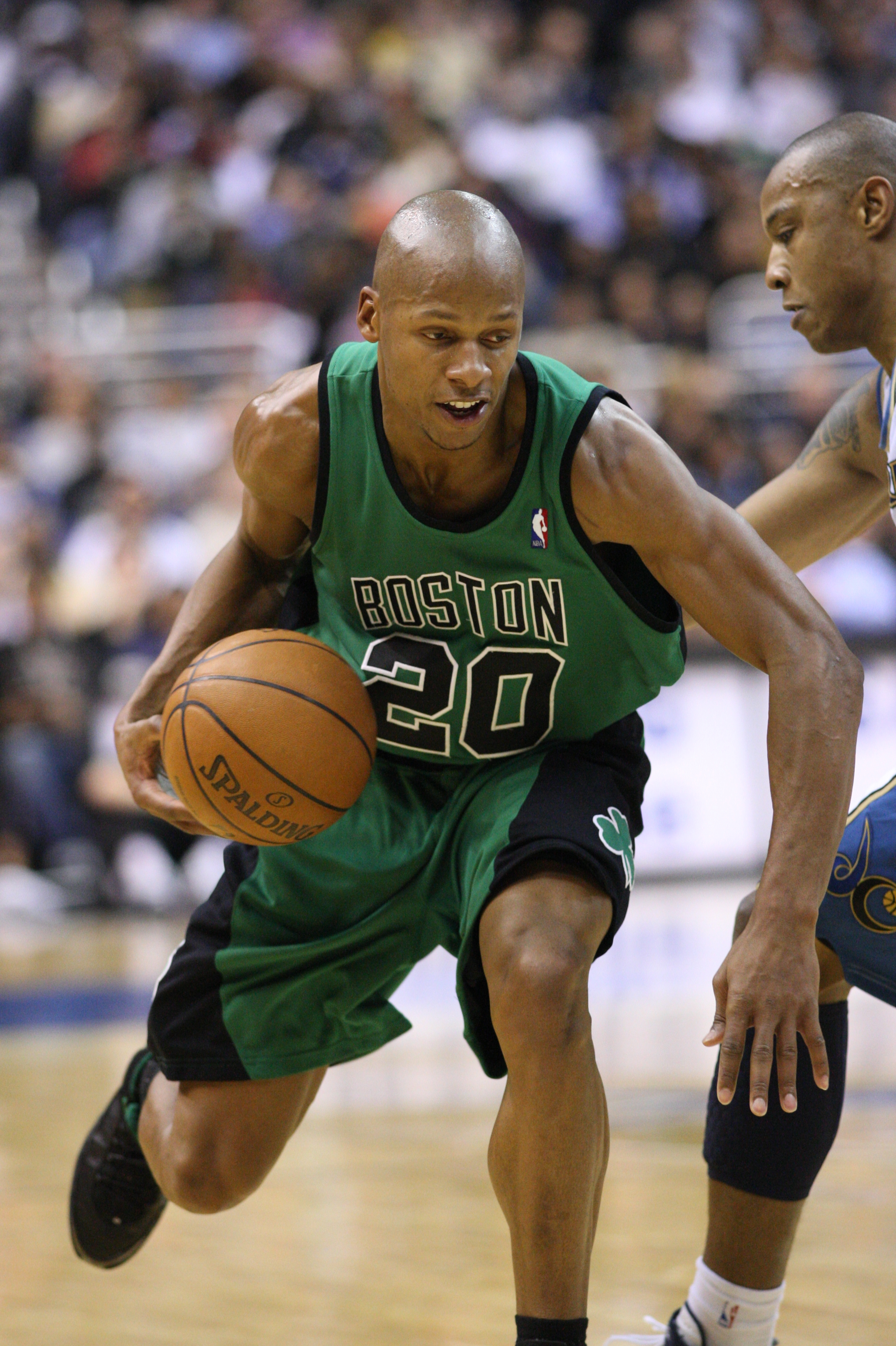
Ray Allen

=== 2007–08: Back to glory ===
On May 22, the Celtics were assigned the 5th overall selection in the NBA draft lottery, essentially losing their chance of drafting either Greg Oden or Kevin Durant, who both were considered to go 1st and 2nd in the Draft. The 5th pick was the worst-case scenario for the Celtics, who had a 19.9% chance of obtaining the 1st overall selection. However, on June 28, the day of the 2007 NBA draft, the Celtics traded the 5th pick along with Wally Szczerbiak and Delonte West to the Seattle SuperSonics in exchange for All-Star 3-point specialist Ray Allen and the 35th overall selection prior to the event, and with the 5th pick selected forward Jeff Green for Seattle. In the second round of the Draft, the Celtics selected guard Gabe Pruitt with the 32nd pick, which was their own, and forward Glen "Big Baby" Davis with the 35th pick, previously obtained from Seattle. On July 31, the Celtics traded for 10-time All-Star and 2004 MVP Kevin Garnett in the single largest trade for one player in NBA history. He was acquired from the Minnesota Timberwolves in exchange for Al Jefferson, Ryan Gomes, Theo Ratliff, Gerald Green, Sebastian Telfair, Boston's 2009 first-round draft pick (top three protected), the return of Minnesota's conditional first-round draft pick previously obtained in the 2006 Ricky Davis–Wally Szczerbiak trade and cash considerations. By adding Garnett to All-Stars Paul Pierce and Ray Allen, the trade brought a new era of relevancy to the long struggling franchise, but it also left the roster short-handed. Adding depth became an immediate concern. The Celtics followed the Garnett trade by signing guards Eddie House and Jackie Manuel, and later center Scot Pollard. Later, Ainge called and asked 5-time All-Star Reggie Miller to return from his 2-year retirement and join the roster in a reserve role. Miller strongly considered the possibility of playing alongside Garnett, but ultimately decided not to join the Celtics. On August 27, forward James Posey signed with the team and was considered a decisive signing which instantly gave the Celtics a drastic improvement to their bench.

On September 26, center Esteban Batista and guard Dahntay Jones signed non-guaranteed contracts with the Celtics, two days before the beginning of training camp and the team's departure to Rome for the 2007 NBA Europe Live Tour. Curiously, Jones was involved in a trade back in the 2003 NBA draft, in which the Celtics drafted him with the 20th overall selection, but immediately traded him with the 16th pick, Troy Bell, to the Memphis Grizzlies in exchange for the 13th pick, Marcus Banks, and the 27th pick, Kendrick Perkins. Ultimately, the Celtics waived Batista on October 16, and Manuel and Jones on October 25, bringing the roster down to 14 players, one shy of the league maximum of 15 players, in order to have roster flexibility and be able to sign another player midway through the season.

The Celtics started the season hot, winning their first eight games, and going into 2008 with a 26–3 record. Before 2007 closed, Brandon Wallace was released in order to have even more roster flexibility, bringing the roster down to the league minimum of 13 players. During the 2008 NBA All-Star Weekend, Allen and Pierce invited resting center P. J. Brown to join the Celtics, and Brown eventually signed with the team on February 28. The final roster move occurred on March 4, as guard free agent Sam Cassell signed with the Celtics, even if his debut was delayed due to attending a family funeral on his hometown of Baltimore.

The regular season had the Celtics finish with a league-high 66–16 record, which was also the most wins in a single season since their previous championship season of 1986. Their record guaranteed them home court advantage for the entire playoffs. The 2008 NBA Playoffs, however, were bumpier than many believed they should be. Their First round series was against the eighth-seeded Atlanta Hawks. At home, the Celtics were dominant: their lowest home margin of victory against the Hawks in the playoffs was 19, in Game 2. However, the Hawks were able to beat the Celtics in Atlanta. The series went seven games, with the home team winning each game. The second round against LeBron James and the Cleveland Cavaliers also went to seven games, with each match won by the home team.

In the Eastern Conference finals, the Celtics faced Chauncey Billups, Richard Hamilton and the Detroit Pistons. In Game 2, the Celtics finally lost at home, and rumors began to fly that the Celtics had gotten too tired from consecutive seven-game series to pull off a title, especially with the Pistons having taken their first two series in six and five games, respectively. But the Celtics bounced back to win Game 3 on the road in Detroit. The series continued, and the Celtics took down the Pistons in six games, winning the deciding game on the road.

The 2008 NBA Finals were contested with Kobe Bryant, Pau Gasol, Lamar Odom and a Los Angeles Lakers team in the middle of a dominant playoff run. They swept the Denver Nuggets in the first round, took the Utah Jazz in the second round in six games, and extinguished the repeat hopes of the defending-champion San Antonio Spurs in five games in the Western Conference finals.

The first few games of the series started with the Celtics once again dominating at the TD Banknorth Garden, the Celtics home turf. Game 1 saw Paul Pierce come back after apparently suffering a knee injury earlier in the game, and taking over the game for a 98–88 Celtics win. But in Game 2, Boston nearly lost a 20-point lead, ultimately winning, 97–91. Squandered leads would later become the story of the series. When the Lakers returned to Staples Center and won Game 3, 87–81, then took a 24-point lead in the second quarter of Game 4, some believed momentum in the series had shifted the Lakers' way.

However, the Celtics did not give up. Led by a bench that outscored the Lakers bench by 20 points, they fought back. The Celtics locked up their defense and took over Game 4 with a crushing 97–91 victory, the biggest comeback in NBA Finals history until the New York Knicks' 29-point comeback win over the San Antonio Spurs in Game 4 of the 2026 Finals. Although the Lakers took Game 5, 103–98, the series went back to Boston for Game 6, and the Celtics finished it off with a dominating 131–92 victory. This game would mark the largest margin of victory for a clinching finals game in NBA history. The "Boston Three Party", as Garnett, Allen and NBA Finals MVP Paul Pierce became known, had finally brought a 17th banner to Boston, the first new banner for the new Garden and the first such win in 22 years. Indicating the bumpy the playoffs were for the Celtics, they had to play 26 playoff games, the most a team had ever endured in a single postseason, surpassing the 1994 New York Knicks, whom Celtics Coach Doc Rivers played for, and the 2005 Detroit Pistons, each of whom played 25, but lost their respective finals in seven games (Knicks in 1994, Pistons in 2005). This record was set in Game 6 of the Finals. It was also the most a team needed to win a championship, surpassing the 1988 Los Angeles Lakers, who needed 24 in order to win the championship that year.

=== After the championship ===
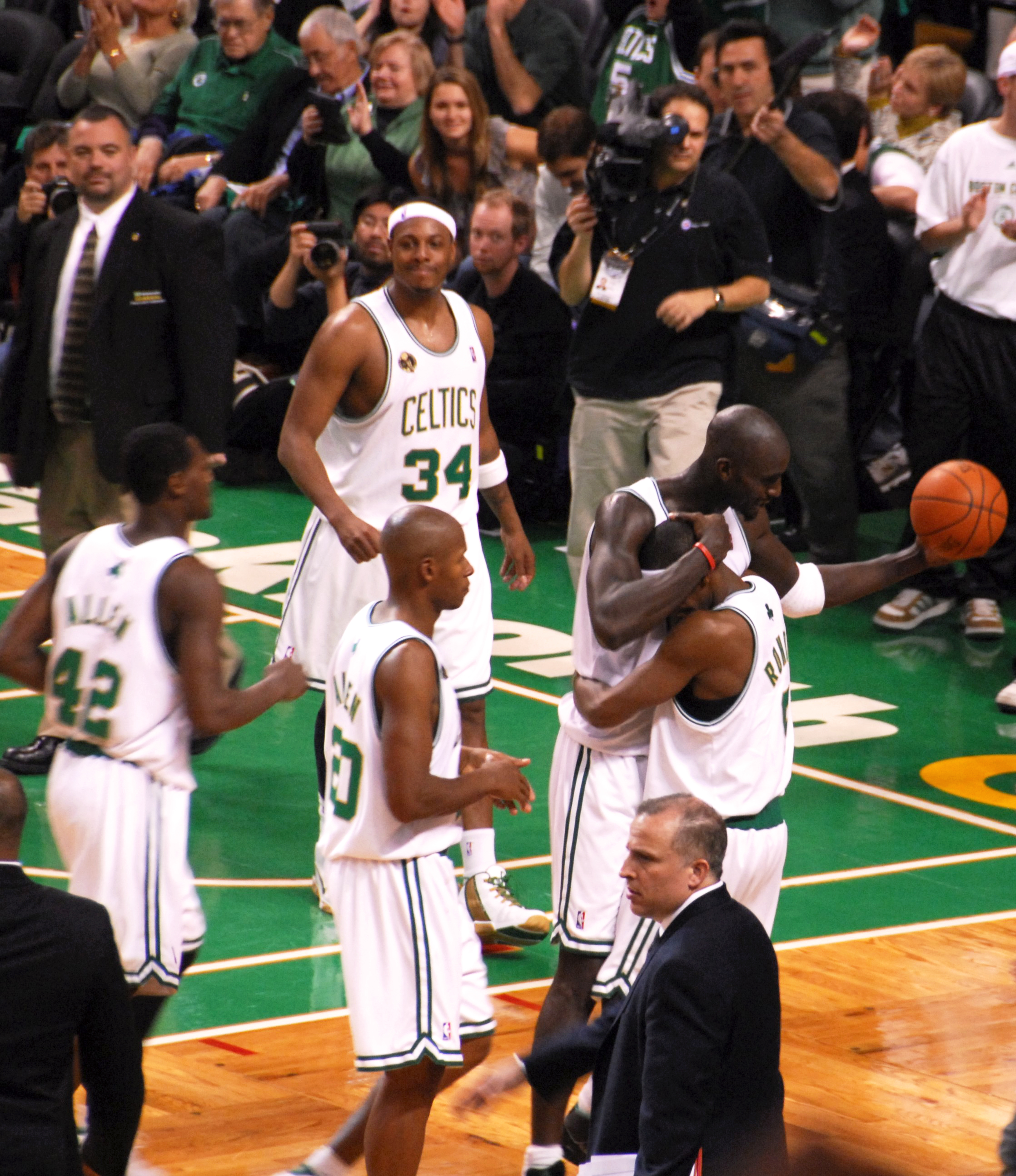
The Celtics during the tip-off game of the 2008–09 season. Clockwise from top: Paul Pierce (34), Kevin Garnett embracing Rajon Rondo, Ray Allen (20) and Tony Allen (42).

The Celtics followed up the championship season with more dominance, winning the Atlantic Division with a record of 62–20. Unfortunately, it was announced just before the playoffs that Garnett would miss the entire post-season. In the first round of the 2009 NBA Playoffs, the team faced the seventh seed Chicago Bulls. Although the Celtics were favored, the Bulls surprised them with overtime wins in games 1 and 4. Thanks to Ray Allen and Paul Pierce, Boston had a 3–2 advantage going back to Chicago. In game six, though Ray Allen scored 51 points, the Bulls would win in a dramatic triple-overtime victory thanks to John Salmons, Ben Gordon and eventual NBA Rookie of the Year Derrick Rose. The Celtics, however would ultimately prevail in game 7.

In the second round, Boston faced the Orlando Magic in a series that would also go to seven games. However, aided by Hedo Türkoğlu's 25 points, the Magic would defeat the Celtics in Boston 101–82, ending their bid for a second straight title.

Prior to the 2009–10 NBA Season, Boston signed Rasheed Wallace. Wallace had had a major impact in his 5 1/2 seasons with the Detroit Pistons, where he had won the 2004 NBA Championship. They won the Atlantic Division with a record of 50–32, then beat Miami 4–1 in the playoffs, followed by the Cavaliers 4–2. After a 4–2 series over the Magic in the ECF, the Celtics once again contested the Finals with the Lakers, but fell to them 4–3, with games 1, 2, 6, and 7 played in Los Angeles.

The 2010 off-season saw the Celtics make the controversial move of signing veteran center Shaquille O'Neal for the veteran minimum salary, as he added still more age to a roster with most of its players over 30. They won the division again with a 56–26 record and acquired the No. 3 playoff seed. After sweeping the Knicks 4–0, they faced the now LeBron James-led Miami Heat, but the age of the Celtics' roster finally caught up with them as Miami won the series 4–1. O'Neal, who had been injured much of the season, retired shortly afterwards.

At the 2011 NBA draft, the Celtics selected Providence swingman MarShon Brooks with the 25th overall pick then immediately traded his rights to the Brooklyn Nets for the rights to the 27th overall pick, power forward JaJuan Johnson. Then the Celtics selected E'Twaun Moore with the 55th overall pick in the 2nd round (reason being for his choice of #55), which reunited the Purdue teammates. During the short preseason following the 2011 NBA lockout, the Celtics signed free agents Marquis Daniels, Chris Wilcox, Keyon Dooling and Greg Stiemsma, while acquiring Brandon Bass from the Magic for Glen Davis and Von Wafer. They also re-signed Jeff Green, only to have it voided after a physical revealed that Green was diagnosed with an aortic aneurysm, forcing him to miss the season. The Celtics started the season 0–3 with Paul Pierce out with a heel injury. To fill the void, the Celtics signed French swingman Mickaël Piétrus, but did not make his season debut until January 6, 2012, against the Indiana Pacers. The Celtics, however, continued to struggle, at one point posting a five-game losing streak that was the longest in the 'Big Three' era. At the All Star break, the Celtics were below .500 with a 15–17 record. However, they were one of the hottest teams after the break, going 24–10 the rest of the year and winning their 5th division title in a row. The Celtics would end up making the playoffs as the fourth seed in the Eastern Conference in the 2012 NBA Playoffs.

In the playoffs, the Celtics faced the Atlanta Hawks in the first round, beating them in six games led by strong play from Pierce and Garnett. In the Conference Semifinals the Celtics faced the Philadelphia 76ers led by Doug Collins and a young group of promising players that would push the Celtics into a full-seven-game series. Following a Game 7 85–75 win the Celtics faced the Miami Heat in the Eastern Conference finals, who had defeated them in the playoffs the previous year. After losing Game 1 93–79, Boston fought back, pushing Miami into a Game 2 overtime, but ultimately fell short losing 115–111. Facing a 0–2 deficit heading back to Boston, the Celtics would come back with a strong 101–91 Game 3 win and then a hard-fought 93–91 Game 4 overtime win, with Dwyane Wade missing a potential game-winning three-point shot at the buzzer. The C's then won Game 5 in Miami 94–90, giving them a chance to take the series back at the Garden. The Celtics could not close out the series, however. Game 6 ended up in a blowout home loss of 98–79 taking the series back to Miami for Game 7, where the Celtics built an early lead but eventually lost 101–88; Miami would go on to defeat the Oklahoma City Thunder in the Finals.

==== End of the "Big Three" ====
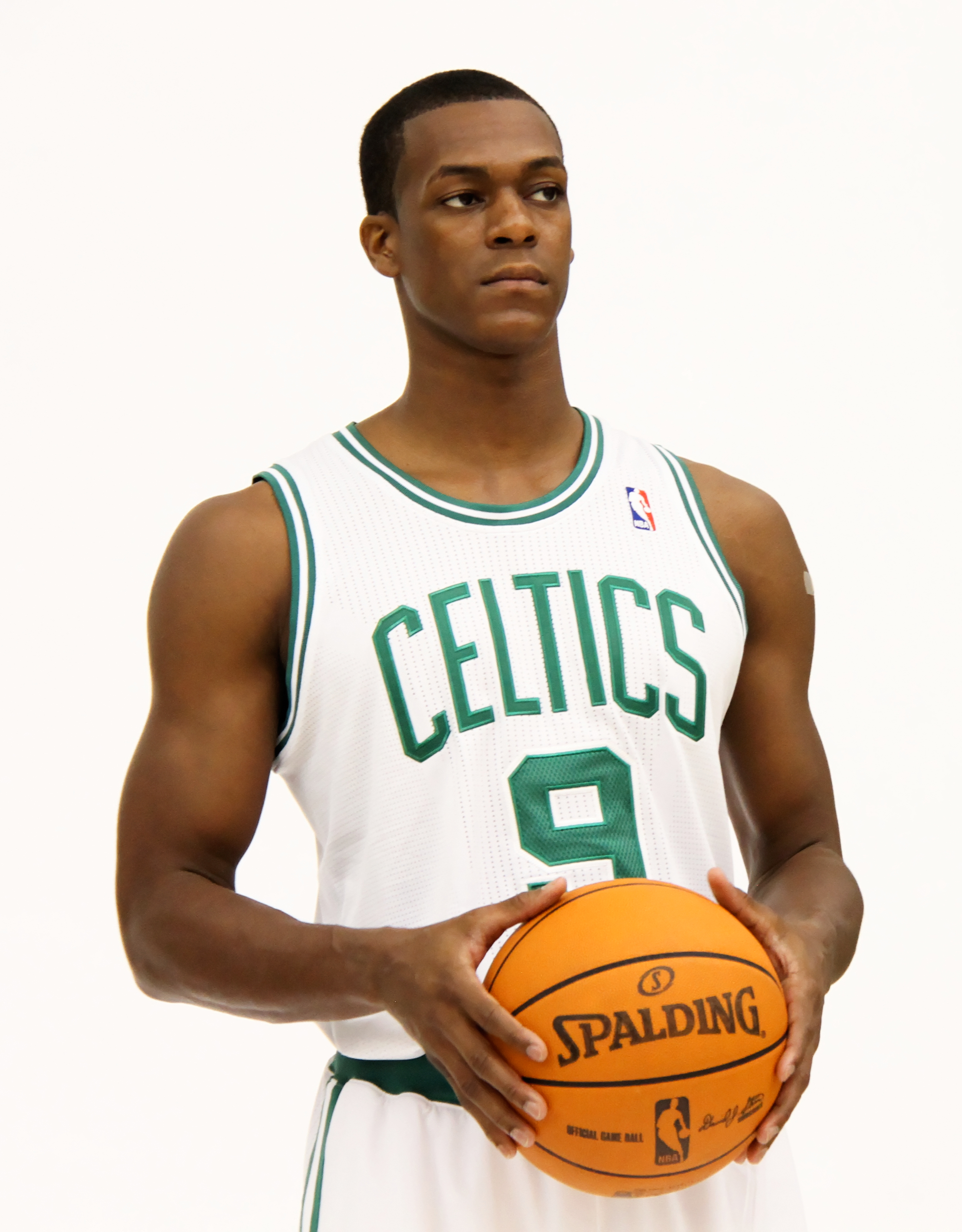
Rajon Rondo became the Celtics' leader once the Big Three left.

2012 was a pivotal year to Danny Ainge's Celtics, as both Ray Allen and Kevin Garnett became free agents and In the 2012 NBA draft, the Celtics drafted three players, Jared Sullinger, Fab Melo and Kris Joseph with their 21st, 22nd and 51st picks respectively. While Garnett renewed, Allen chose to sign with the Miami Heat for less money, bringing the five-year "Big Three" era to a somewhat acrimonious end. The Celtics also signed free agents Jason Terry, Jason Collins, Leandro Barbosa and Darko Miličić, acquired Courtney Lee in a three-team sign and trade – where Johnson, Moore, Sean Williams and a future second round pick were sent to the Houston Rockets and the Portland Trail Blazers got Sasha Pavlovic – and renewed with Brandon Bass and Keyon Dooling along with Chris Wilcox and Jeff Green, who both were returning to play after sustaining season-ending heart ailments. Dooling wound up waived, and briefly hired as player development coordinator for the Celtics before a half-season signing with the Memphis Grizzlies.

Later in the season, it was announced that Miličić would return to Europe for a family matter. On December 24, the Celtics signed forward Jarvis Varnado of the NBA D-League team Sioux Falls to a deal. He was then waived on January 6 along with rookie forward Kris Joseph. On January 27, 2013, it was revealed that Rajon Rondo had torn the ACL on his right knee and would miss the rest of the season along with part of the next season. On February 2, it was announced that Jared Sullinger would also miss the rest of the season due to back surgery. Despite losing Rondo and Sullinger to injury, the Celtics compiled a seven-game winning streak, including victories over the Heat in double overtime and the Nuggets in triple overtime. The winning streak was snapped on February 12 when Leandro Barbosa suffered a torn ACL; he would miss the rest of the season as well.

Then on February 18, the Celtics signed swingman Terrence Williams to a deal. On February 21, the Celtics traded Leandro Barbosa and center Jason Collins for Washington Wizards guard Jordan Crawford. On February 28 and March 21, respectively, the Celtics signed forwards D. J. White and Shavlik Randolph.

The Celtics finished the season with 41 wins, but played only 81 games after a home game against the Indiana Pacers on April 16 was cancelled following the Boston Marathon bombing; the game was not made up with both teams already assured of their playoff positions. The 41 wins were the lowest totals the Celtics achieved as a playoff-bound team since 2004. The Celtics trailed 3–0 to the New York Knicks in the first round of the 2013 NBA Playoffs, before losing the series in six games. In Game 6, the Celtics nearly completed a comeback when they went on a 20–0 run to cut the lead to 4, but that was the closest they got as the New York Knicks would take over to win.

On June 3, 2013, head coach Doc Rivers was allowed out of his contract to coach Los Angeles Clippers and the Celtics were given a 2015 unprotected first-round pick as compensation. A few days later, Paul Pierce and Kevin Garnett (after waiving his no-trade clause), along with Jason Terry and D. J. White, were traded to the Brooklyn Nets for Keith Bogans, MarShon Brooks, Kris Humphries, Kris Joseph, Gerald Wallace, and three future first-round draft picks (2014, 2016, 2018), with the option of swapping 2018 pick with Brooklyn's 2017 pick. The deal was later approved by the league on July 12, 2013, effectively ending the 'Big 3' era and marking the start of a youth movement for the team. One of the leaders of said movement was 2013 draft pick Kelly Olynyk.

=== 2013–2017: Brad Stevens and Isaiah Thomas years ===
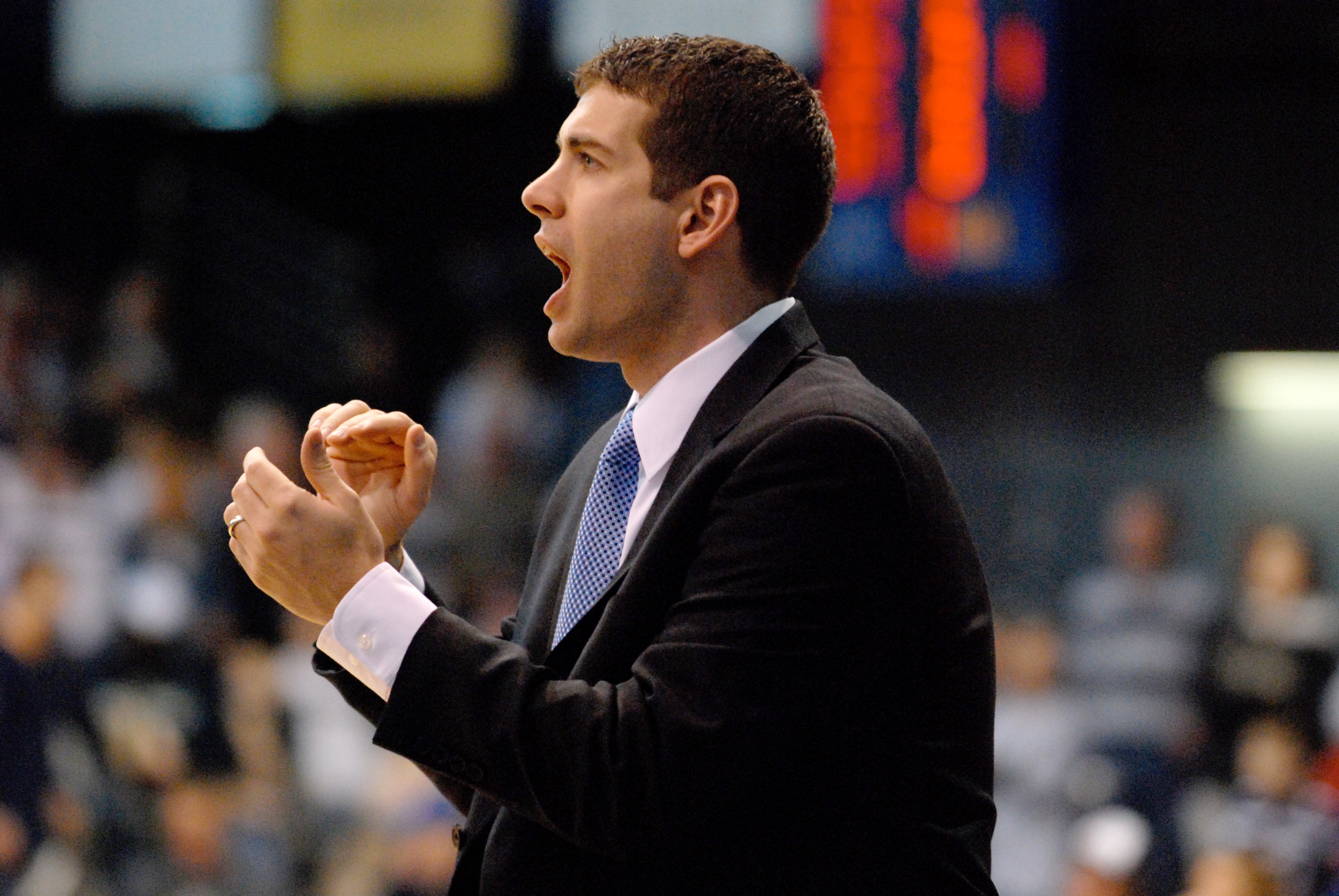
Brad Stevens

On July 3, 2013, Butler University head coach Brad Stevens was hired to replace Doc Rivers as head coach. On January 15 the Celtics traded Jordan Crawford and MarShon Brooks to the Golden State Warriors in exchange for future first and second round picks as well as Miami Heat center Joel Anthony. On January 19, Rajon Rondo made his return from an ACL tear. He was named the new Captain of the Boston Celtics, the 15th Team Captain in team history. The 2013–14 season marked Boston's first failure to qualify for the playoffs since 2007.

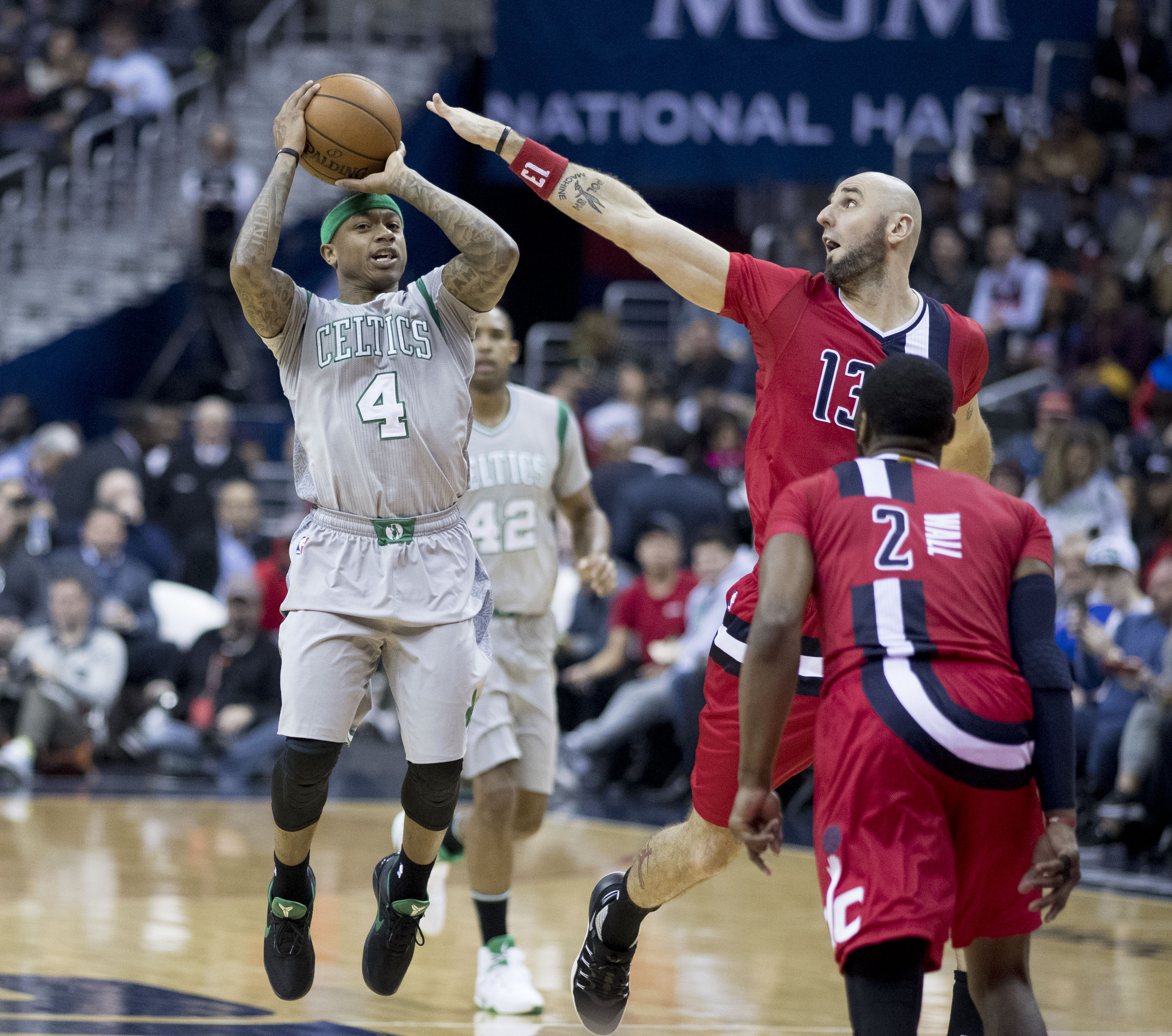
Isaiah Thomas

The next off-season, the Celtics drafted Marcus Smart with the 6th overall pick and James Young with the 17th overall pick in the 2014 NBA draft. The Celtics would also sign Evan Turner. On December 18, 2014, Rondo and rookie Dwight Powell were traded to Dallas for center Brandan Wright, forward Jae Crowder, veteran point guard Jameer Nelson, and future picks. The Celtics would make several roster moves the next few months acquiring Isaiah Thomas, Luigi Datome, and Jonas Jerebko. On February 23, it was announced that Sullinger, the team's leading scorer and rebounder, would miss the remainder of the season with a left metatarsal stress fracture; Sullinger returned on April 3, 2015, on limited minutes. The Celtics finished the season with a 40–42 record, but still managed to clinch the seventh seed in the Eastern Conference Playoffs. The Celtics were swept by the second seeded Cleveland Cavaliers, in the first round of the 2015 NBA Playoffs

In the 2015 NBA draft Boston selected Terry Rozier, R. J. Hunter, Jordan Mickey, and Marcus Thornton with the 16th, 28th, 33rd, and 45th selections respectively.

In the 2015–16 season, Boston once again made the playoffs under Stevens. They were the fifth seed, finishing 48–34, and they faced the Atlanta Hawks in the first round. Boston still could not get past the first round, as the Hawks beat them in six games. The following offseason, however, the Celtics signed free agent center Al Horford from the Hawks.

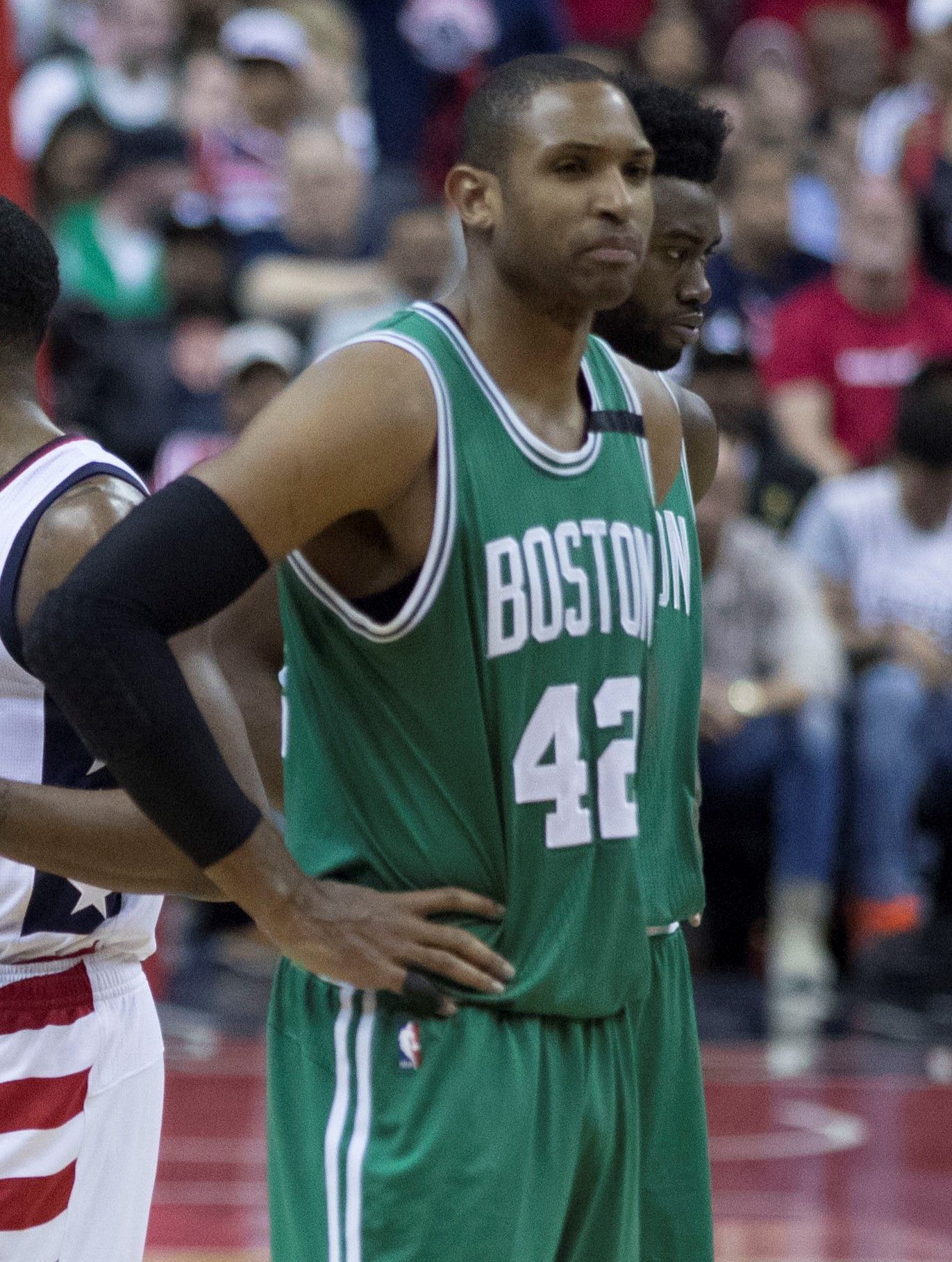
Al Horford would spend two stints with the Celtics in 2016–2019 and 2021–2025, winning a championship in 2024.

=== 2017–2026: Brown and Tatum ===
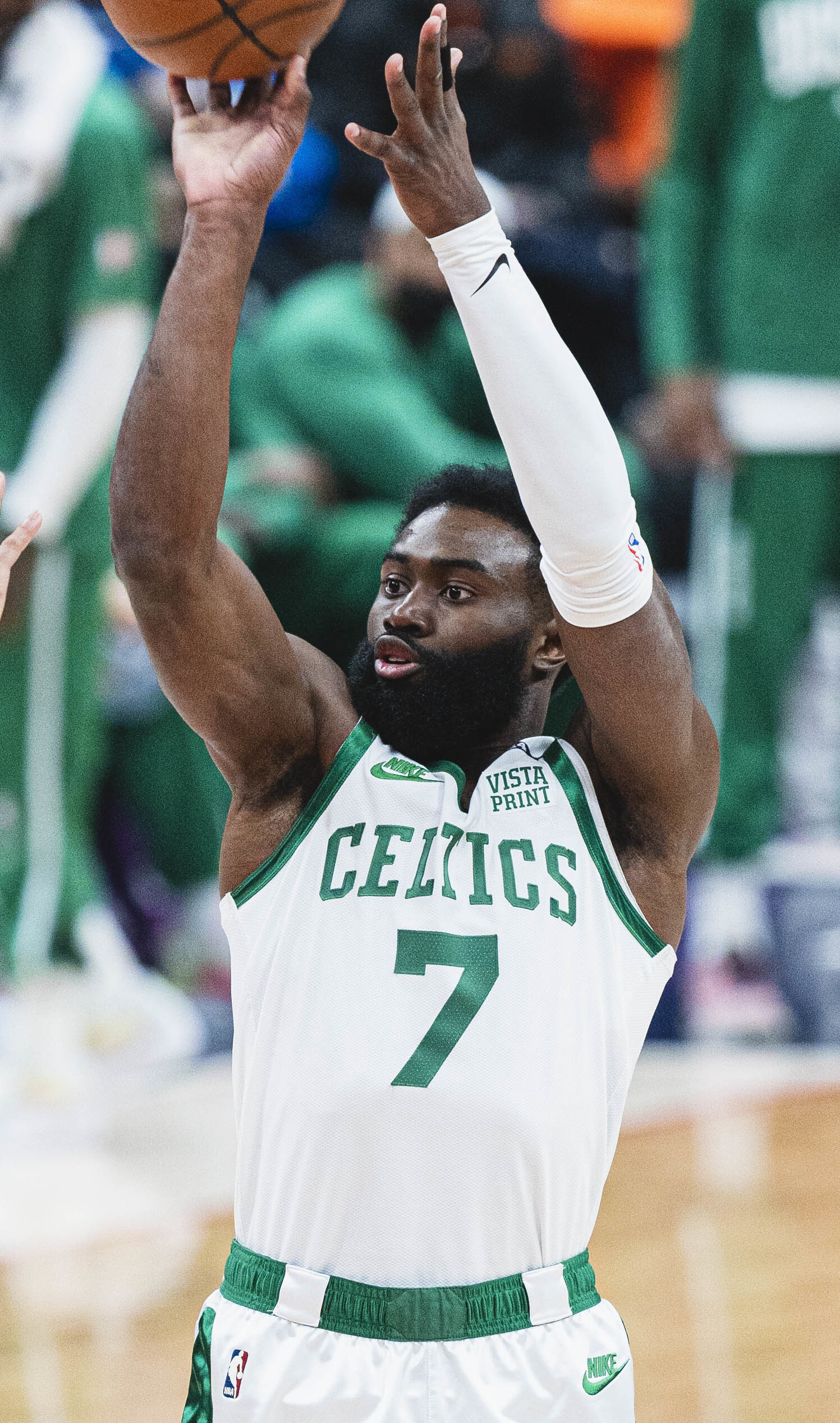
Jaylen Brown

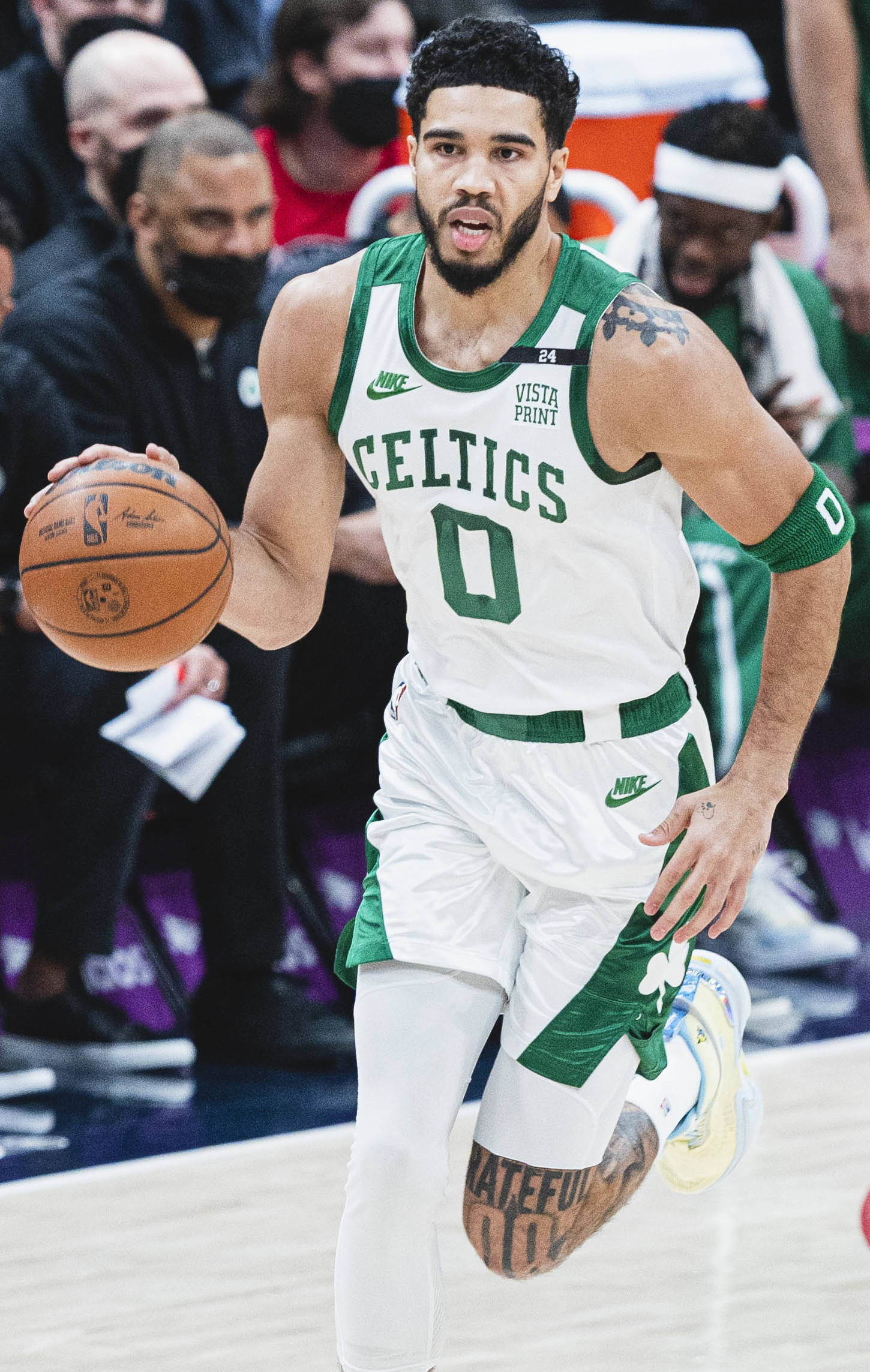
Jayson Tatum

In the 2016 NBA draft, the Celtics selected Jaylen Brown with the third pick. On July 8, 2016, the Celtics signed four-time All-Star Al Horford. The Celtics finished the 2016–17 season with a 53–29 record and clinched the top seed in the Eastern Conference. After a hip injury ended Thomas' playoff run in game 2 of the Eastern Conference finals, the Celtics eventually lost to the Cavaliers in five games. For the 2017 NBA draft, the Celtics won the draft lottery, earning them the first pick. (Note: This pick originally belonged to the Brooklyn Nets, but was sent to the Celtics in the 2013 trade involving Paul Pierce and Kevin Garnett. The Nets had the worst record in the previous season, which gave the Celtics the highest chance of winning the lottery.) They were projected to select freshman guard Markelle Fultz, but the pick was subsequently traded to the Philadelphia 76ers in exchange for the third pick in the 2017 draft and future picks. The 76ers would go on to draft Fultz, while the Celtics used the third pick to select freshman forward Jayson Tatum. During the off-season, the team signed Gordon Hayward. On August 22, 2017, the Celtics agreed to a deal that sent Isaiah Thomas, Jae Crowder, Ante Žižić, and the Brooklyn Nets' 2018 first round draft pick to the Cleveland Cavaliers in exchange for Kyrie Irving.

By the end of the off-season, only four Celtics' players remained from the 2016–17 team, with Marcus Smart being the longest-tenured Celtic from the 2014 NBA draft. On the team's opening night game in the first quarter against the Cavaliers, Hayward suffered a fractured tibia and dislocated ankle in his left leg, causing him to be ruled out for the rest of the regular season. Despite the loss, the Celtics went on a 16-game winning streak, which also went down as the fourth-longest winning streak in the teams' history. The streak started with a 102–92 victory over the Philadelphia 76ers on October 20 and ended on November 22 to the hands of the Miami Heat with a 104–98 loss. The Celtics finished the year with a 55–27 record, good enough for second place in the Eastern Conference. In the playoffs, they defeated the Milwaukee Bucks in the first round in seven games, and continued the feat in the conference semifinals by defeating the Philadelphia 76ers in five games before losing to the Cleveland Cavaliers in seven games in the conference finals.

The Celtics finished the 2018–19 season with a 49–33 record. Analysts started questioning team's performance and chances for the championship when the Celtics had a 10–10 record after the first 20 games on November 24, 2018. The Celtics then won the next eight games improving their record to 18–10. During the eight-game win streak, the Celtics defeated the Cleveland Cavaliers 128–95, the New York Knicks 128–100, and also defeated the Chicago Bulls by 56 points (133–77), setting a record for the largest margin in a victory in franchise history, while also tying the record for largest victory margin by an away team. On February 9, 2019, the Celtics lost 129–128 to the Los Angeles Lakers after former Celtic Rajon Rondo hit the first game-winning shot in his NBA career. The Celtics finished the regular season place fourth in the Eastern Conference. During an April 7 game, Marcus Smart injured his hip and was ruled out for the rest of the regular season and the first round of the playoffs. In the 2019 playoffs, the Celtics swept the Indiana Pacers in the first round, and then lost to the Milwaukee Bucks in five games.

The Celtics held four picks in the 2019 NBA draft. Following a series of transactions, the team landed Romeo Langford with the 14th pick and also added Grant Williams, Carsen Edwards, and Tremont Waters (2020 G-league Rookie of the year). During the 2019 off-season, Irving and Horford signed with the Brooklyn Nets and Philadelphia 76ers, respectively. On June 30, 2019, the Celtics and point guard Kemba Walker agreed to a four-year maximum contract worth $141 million. On July 6, 2019, the Celtics officially acquired Walker in a sign and trade with the Charlotte Hornets; the Celtics sent guard Terry Rozier and a protected 2020 second-round draft pick to Charlotte in exchange for Walker and a 2020 second-round draft pick. On July 1, 2019, the Celtics agreed to a two-year contract with center Enes Kanter.

Following the suspension of the 2019–20 NBA season, the Celtics were one of the 22 teams invited to the NBA Bubble to participate in the final 8 games of the regular season. In the 2020 playoffs, the Celtics swept the Philadelphia 76ers in the first round, beat the Toronto Raptors in a seven-game series, and fell to the Miami Heat in the Eastern Conference finals in six games. Boston struggled with injuries in the 2020–21 season, with Walker, Tatum and Brown all missing games at different points in the season due to injury and COVID-19. Boston could not automatically qualify for the playoffs and were sent to the play-in tournament, where they defeated the Washington Wizards 119–100. In the playoffs, they lost to the Brooklyn Nets in five games. After Game 4, a Celtics fan threw a plastic water bottle at Irving. When asked about it after the game, Irving talked about the "underlying racism" that leads to fans treating athletes like they are in a "human zoo". Before the playoff series, he was asked whether or not he experienced racism while in the TD Garden and responded: "I'm not the only one that could attest to this, but it's just, you know — it is what it is." Irving was not alone in sharing this sentiment. After the incident, several players shared their experience, including Celtics center Tristan Thompson, and guard Marcus Smart, who wrote about an encounter with a Celtics fan who had called him a slur in The Players' Tribune the summer before the season.

On June 2, 2021, the Celtics named head coach Brad Stevens as president of basketball operations replacing Danny Ainge after he announced his retirement. On June 18, Stevens made his first transaction in his new position trading away Kemba Walker, the 16th pick in the 2021 NBA draft, and a 2025 second-round pick in exchange for Horford, Moses Brown, and a 2023 second-round pick. The deal gave the Celtics a bit more financial flexibility with Horford due about $20 million less than Walker over the next two years. The Celtics also improved their depth in the frontcourt by adding Horford and Moses Brown, who recorded 21 points and 23 rebounds, which included 19 rebounds in the first half, in a March 27 game between the Celtics and the Thunder. On June 23, 2021, it was reported that Stevens had made the decision to hire Ime Udoka as his own replacement as head coach of the Celtics. Tatum made his third All-Star appearance off the bench at the 2022 NBA All-Star Game in Cleveland.

The Celtics started the season 23–24, but went on a 28–7 turnaround in their last 35 games and finished with a 51–31 record. In April 2022, the Celtics qualified for the 2022 NBA playoffs as the second seed in the Eastern Conference and swept the Brooklyn Nets in the first round of the postseason. They next faced the Milwaukee Bucks in the Eastern Conference Semifinals and the Miami Heat in the Eastern Conference finals, defeating both teams in seven-game series, earning the Celtics their first Finals appearance since 2010. The Celtics took a 2–1 series lead, but lost the next three games to lose to the Golden State Warriors 4–2.

In September, the Celtics suspended Udoka for the whole 2022–23 season for engaging in an improper intimate relationship with a female staffer. Assistant coach Joe Mazzulla replaced Udoka as the interim head coach. On February 16, 2023, Mazzulla was named the team's permanent head coach after leading the Celtics to a league-best 42–17 record at the NBA All-Star break. After overcoming a 3–2 deficit against the Philadelphia 76ers to advance to the Eastern Conference finals, the Celtics fell behind 3–0 in a rematch against the Heat. They battled their way back to Game 7 thanks to a Derrick White buzzer-beater in Game 6, but the Heat ultimately prevented the first 3–0 comeback in NBA history with a decisive win in Boston.

During the 2023 off-season, the Celtics acquired Kristaps Porziņģis from the Wizards, and traded Marcus Smart to the Memphis Grizzlies in a three-team deal, and also traded Grant Williams to the Dallas Mavericks. On October 1, 2023, the Celtics acquired Jrue Holiday in exchange for Malcolm Brogdon, Robert Williams III and two draft picks. On February 7, 2024, before the trade deadline, the Celtics acquired Xavier Tillman from the Grizzlies.

The Celtics finished the 2023–24 regular season with the best record in the NBA, securing a 64–18 record. After the regular season's close, the Celtics entered the 2024 NBA playoffs, defeating the Miami Heat in the first round, moving on to defeat the Cleveland Cavaliers in the East Semifinals, and moving on again to defeat the Indiana Pacers in the Eastern Conference finals. The Celtics' victory in the Eastern Conference finals on May 27, 2024, was accompanied by the announcement that Jaylen Brown had been selected as the NBA Eastern Conference finals MVP, and Brown was presented with the Larry Bird trophy—the first of his career.

As the Celtics advanced to the finals as championship favorites against the Dallas Mavericks, they would take a 3–0 lead in the series. The Mavericks won game four to avoid a sweep, but Boston finished the series in game five on the anniversary of their 2008 win. Jaylen Brown was named Finals MVP.

The Celtics kept a majority of their roster entering the 2024–25 season, and though they were not as dominant as the previous season, they still finished with 62 wins, their first back-to-back 60-win seasons since the 2008–09 season. In the 2025 NBA playoffs, the Celtics qualified as the 2nd seed. But after defeating the Orlando Magic in five games of the first round, they lost in the conference semifinals to the New York Knicks in six games. Game 4 of the Knicks series at Madison Square Garden saw all-star Jayson Tatum suffer a season-ending Achilles tendon rupture, which also forced him to sit out until March 6,2026, against the Dallas Mavericks.

The Celtics made some major offseason moves to abide under the new salary apron rules, trading key players Jrue Holiday to the Portland Trail Blazers, and Kristaps Porzingis to the Atlanta Hawks.

In 2025, the team was sold to a private-equity led investor group led by Bill Chisolm.

=== 2026–present: Post-Jaylen Brown and arrival of Paul George ===
In July 2026, the Celtics traded Jaylen Brown to the Philadelphia 76ers for Paul George, two first-round draft picks, and two second-round draft picks.
