= Boston College Center for Work and Family =

- Established: 1990
- Director: Jennifer Sabatini Fraone
- Website: www.bc.edu/cwf

The Boston College Center for Work and Family (CWF) is a university-based research center focused on bridging academic research and corporate practice to help employers to improve the lives of working people and their families. The center is part of the Carroll School of Management and Boston College. It was founded in 1990 at the Boston University School of Social Work by professor Bradley Googins. The Center focuses its work primarily on the private sector and currently has more than 100 corporate members including many Fortune 500 companies.

== Research ==
The Boston College Center for Work & Family conducts research on a wide variety of topics related to work-life, workplace flexibility, men and fatherhood, women's advancement, diversity and inclusion, global workforce issues, and employee health and wellness efforts.

== Corporate partnerships ==
The Center maintains three corporate partnership initiatives, the Boston College Roundtable, the Global Workforce Roundtable and the New England Work & Family Association. Nearly 100 large employers currently collaborate with the Center.

== See also ==
- Work–life balance in the United States
