= Boston University School of Social Work =

Graduate school of Boston University

Coordinates: 42.3508°N 71.1052°W

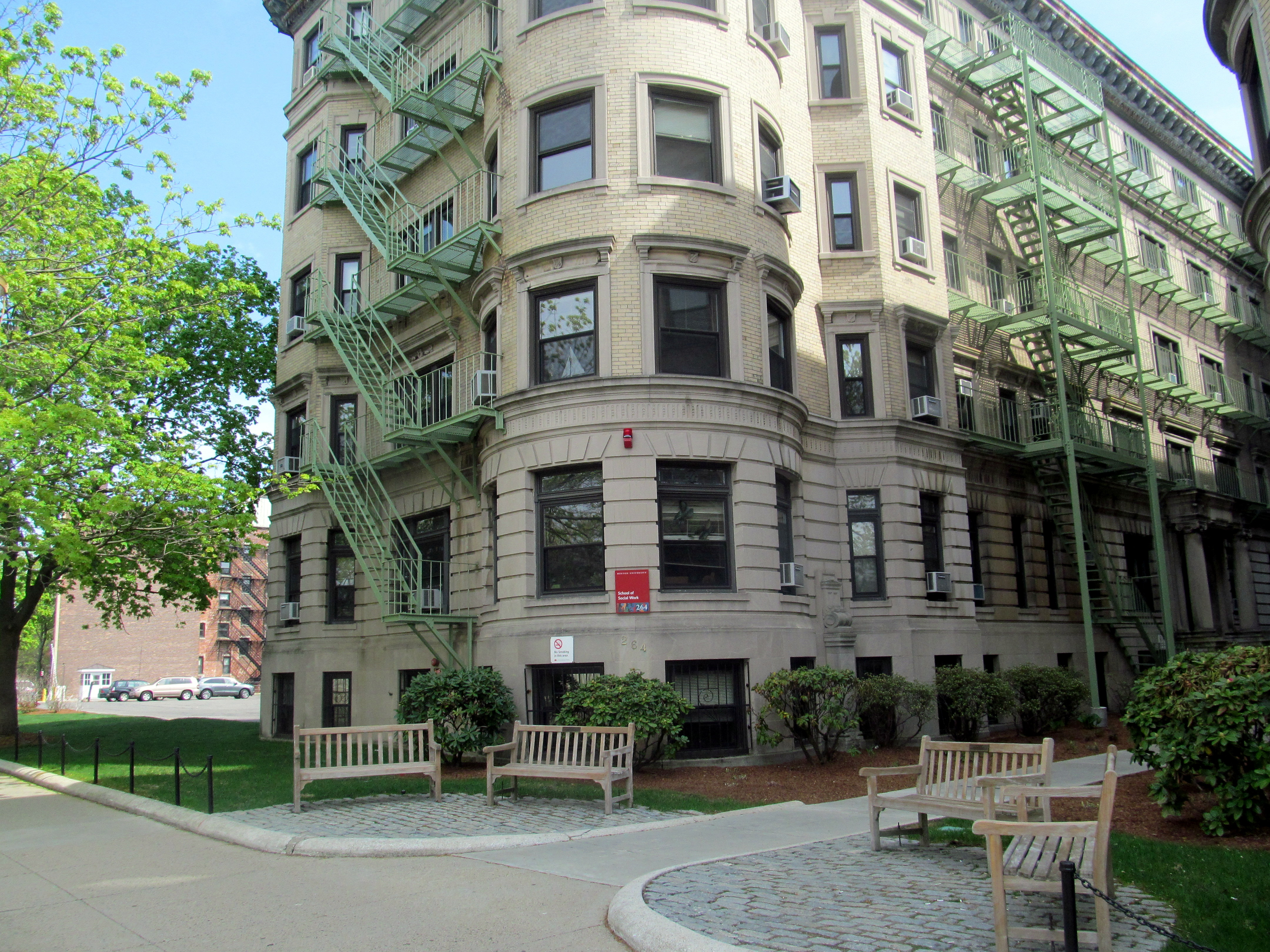
Boston University School of Social Work building in 2015

The Boston University School of Social Work (SSW) is the graduate school for social work of Boston University.

== Areas of study ==
BUSSW offers full and part-time programs leading to the Master of Social Work degree, with majors in Clinical and Macro Social Work Practice.

The satellite campuses are located in Bedford, Massachusetts, Cape Cod, Massachusetts, Fall River, Massachusetts, and Worcester, Massachusetts, which offers an in-person/online hybrid program.

The School of Theology, the School of Education, and the School of Public Health have dual-degree programs with the School of Social Work.

The School is the location for The Network for Professional Education and the Center for Aging & Disability Education & Research (CADER) - previously known as the Institute for Geriatric Social Work

== History ==
The School had its beginnings in the School of Education and was later called the School of Religious and Social Work.

In 1937 the Division of Social Work inaugurated a two-year graduate program. In 1939 it was accredited provisionally as a school of social work, and in 1940 became a separate entity as the School of Social Work. Since 1942 it has offered only the graduate program, and since 1943, it has had accreditation as a school of social work.

== Accreditation ==
The School is accredited by the Council on Social Work Education and is authorized to award master's degrees in Social Work.

== See also ==
List of social work schools
