= Boston College Media Research and Action Project =

The Movement / Media Research and Action Project (MRAP), operated from 1985 to 2017. It was a faculty-student-community organization. Their stated mission was "...to strengthen progressive social movements working toward social justice and inclusive, participatory democracy."
