= Boston University Brussels =

Coordinates: 50.81739°N 4.402176°E

Boston University - Brussels Graduate Center
- Type: Private
- Active: 1972–2014
- Dean: Frank Billingsley
- Location: Brussels, BE
- Campus: Urban
- Website: www.bu.edu/brussels

Boston University Brussels, officially named the Boston University Brussels Graduate Center, and also known as BUB, was part of Boston University's Metropolitan College (MET), one of seventeen degree-granting colleges that make up Boston University. In 1972 Boston University became the first major American university to offer graduate business management degrees in Europe with the opening of its campus in Brussels, Belgium.
Due to its location in the unofficial capital of Europe, home to the European Union and NATO, the school placed a strong emphasis on international business, and the student body comprised a diverse range of nationalities and cultures. Participants typically had several years of work experience and were often employed by one of the many multinational corporations and government organizations located in the Benelux region. Classes were held throughout the day or during weekday evenings allowing students to earn a graduate degree within 18–24 months while working full-time.

Classes were conducted in English with fewer than 25 students.

Boston University in Brussels counts more than 300'000 University alumni.

The institution celebrated its 40 years existence on April, the 20th 2012. Boston University Brussels closed its doors in early 2014.

== Graduate programs ==
Boston University Brussels offered several international business programs with classes taught in English following the business education style of the U.S. main campus.

Graduate Degrees

- Master of Science in Leadership (MSL)
- Master of Arts in International Relations (MAIR)

Graduate Diploma

- Graduate Diploma in Finance

Graduate Certificates

- Graduate Certificate in Human Resources
- Graduate Certificate in International Relations
- Graduate Certificate in Management
- Graduate Certificate in Marketing
- Graduate Certificate in Project Management
- Graduate Certificate in Applied Sustainability
- Graduate Certificate in Innovation and Technology

== Campus ==
The Boston University Brussels campus was situated on Boulevard du Triomphe / Triomflaan opposite the Université Libre de Bruxelles La Plaine campus.

== See also ==
- Boston University
- Boston University Graduate School of Management
- Boston University Metropolitan College
- List of business schools in Europe
- MBA
