= 1994 Massachusetts rent control referendum =

The 1994 Massachusetts rent control referendum, designated Question 9, was a statewide ballot initiative approved on November 8, 1994, that ended the existing rent-control programs in Boston, Brookline, and Cambridge. The measure passed by approximately 51 percent to 49 percent, despite opposition from a majority of voters in all three municipalities, and took effect on January 1, 1995. It prohibited most forms of local rent control while allowing municipalities to establish voluntary programs that compensated participating property owners for lost rental income.

The initiative grew out of opposition to Cambridge’s rent-control system, which retained significantly stricter restrictions than those in Boston and Brookline. Members of the Cambridge-based Small Property Owners Association pursued statewide repeal after unsuccessful efforts to obtain relief through local government, litigation, and state legislation. Their complaints concerned limits on rent increases, difficulties recovering maintenance costs, and restrictions preventing some owners from occupying their own properties. Legal challenges to the petition’s signatures and eligibility delayed the initiative, but court rulings ultimately allowed it onto the ballot.

The repeal campaign, organized through the Massachusetts Homeowners Coalition, emphasized fairness to small property owners and argued that rent control benefited some affluent tenants while discouraging investment and burdening landlords of modest means. Opponents maintained that rent control protected affordable housing and prevented displacement, and argued that statewide repeal would override local decisions about housing policy. The campaign attracted relatively little public attention, although repeal supporters substantially outraised their opponents.

Following the vote, officials in Boston, Brookline, and Cambridge sought state legislation to preserve their local programs, but those efforts did not restore rent control. The legislature provided temporary protections for certain low-income tenants for up to two years. A subsequent effort to place a measure restoring municipal rent-control authority on the 1996 ballot failed to gather the required signatures.

== Rent control in Massachusetts ==
Massachusetts authorized local rent control in 1970. The programs limited rents and restricted evictions in covered housing, with local boards administering rent adjustments and other regulations. By 1994, only Boston, Brookline, and Cambridge retained active rent-control systems. Boston introduced vacancy decontrol in 1976, allowing apartments to leave rent control when tenants moved out, and Brookline began a partial phaseout in 1991. Cambridge retained a substantially stricter system, generally continuing controls between tenancies and imposing extensive restrictions on condominium conversions, owner occupancy, and the withdrawal of apartments from the rental market.

Opponents argued that rent control worsened housing shortages, accelerated building deterioration, and imposed financial and regulatory burdens on property owners. Housing providers complained that permitted rents failed to keep pace with operating expenses and that obtaining increases to pay for repairs required lengthy hearings and extensive documentation. The restrictions discouraged investment, contributed to deteriorating buildings, and encouraged owners to convert rental apartments into condominiums. Contemporary reporting in Boston linked financially distressed rental properties to abandonment and urban blight, and described allegations that restrictions on rents and conversions created incentives for arson.

The distribution of benefits and costs was another source of controversy. Rent-controlled apartments were not means-tested, and studies found that many were occupied by middle- and upper-income households, including professionals, students, and even European royalty. Opponents argued that the programs therefore provided substantial benefits to tenants who did not need assistance while limiting access for people seeking housing. Lower assessments on regulated properties also shifted part of the municipal property-tax burden onto homeowners and owners of uncontrolled buildings, an issue that helped mobilize opposition in Brookline.

In Cambridge, disputes over rent adjustments and restrictions preventing some owners from occupying their own properties helped give rise to the Small Property Owners Association. After unsuccessful efforts to secure substantial changes through local government, litigation, and state legislation, association members led the campaign for statewide repeal. Supporters of rent control maintained that it preserved affordable rental housing and protected tenants against displacement; they opposed repeal as a threat to those protections and to local control over housing policy.

== Preliminary attempts at repeal ==
=== Small Property Owners Association ===
The repeal effort was led by small Cambridge landlords who felt they were being unfairly treated by the local rent control board. In this way, they used a state ballot question to achieve a primarily local policy change and end what "had long been an ugly, simmering local dispute."

The Small Property Owners Association had its start when David P. Sullivan purchased a six-unit building from his father; all units were rent-controlled. The rent control law allowed landlords to recover possession of a rent-controlled unit if they wanted it for themselves or a family member, and Sullivan wanted to rent it to his daughter, who was getting married. The Rent Control Board denied his petition, however, and it took two years and "substantial concessions" to the tenant in order to get them to leave. The episode aggrieved Sullivan and his family, who believed the Rent Control Board was acting outside the law and was hostile to landlords, and so he helped to found the Small Property Owners Association (SPOA).

Likewise, Denise Jillson purchased a four-family home with her husband. She wanted to use the same provision of the law that allowed owners to occupy their own properties, but was subject to a long delay by the Rent Control Board. While Jillson and her family were living with other relatives, the tenant in the unit she wished to inhabit was subletting rooms in the apartment. This led to Jillson becoming a co-chair of the SPOA and the leader of the statewide ballot campaign.

The other co-chair of the SPOA was Salim Kabawat. By 1993 the organization had more than 1,400 members, many of whom were elderly and immigrants. The SPOA frequently fielded phone calls from distraught property owners who were upset with the way their tenants or the Rent Control Board was treating them.

=== Legislative and legal attempts ===
After the 1991 Cambridge city council elections, the SPOA, seeing a pro-rent control majority for the next two years who were not open to compromise, launched a fundraising campaign to challenge rent control in the courts. Their case focused on five points:

- It had been over 20 years since a housing emergency was declared, and the emergency was now over.
- Rent control failed to provide housing to the poor and the elderly, which was its stated purpose.
- Housing providers were not receiving a fair net operating income.
- The prohibition of condo conversions was illegal.
- Rent control constituted a taking of private property without just compensation.

After losing the case and their appeal, the US Supreme Court declined to hear the case, partly on a technicality. The SPOA, which had nearly 1,000 members by this point, launched another lawsuit in 1992. A Superior Court judge threw out 13 of the 16 claims in March 1993. The judge said many of the issues raised in their lawsuit would be better address in the Statehouse or in City Hall.

With the help of Rep. Philip Travis, the SPOA filed four pieces of legislation in 1993 that would erode rent control in Cambridge. The first would exempt any building with six units or fewer from rent control, the second changed the way rent-controlled properties were assessed, the third would allow rent-controlled units to remain vacant for more than four months, and the last would require the any community that wanted to retain rent control to re-certify that a housing emergency still existed 20+ years after it was used to justify the establishment of rent control.

== Ballot campaign ==
=== Legal background ===
Jon R. Maddox, a Cambridge lawyer, became involved with the Small Property Owners Association in 1993 after learning that his condominium was subject to Cambridge's restrictions on owner occupancy of certain condominium-converted units. Maddox was in danger of being prosecuted for living in a condominium he owned.

The legal basis for the 1994 initiative petition rested on the argument that rent control was a matter of state policy rather than a purely local issue. Maddox's initial draft would have prohibited rent control outright, but the Attorney General's office raised concerns that it might be excluded from the initiative process because its practical operation would be limited to particular municipalities.

Maddox revised the petition to authorize all Massachusetts cities and towns to adopt a limited form of rent control, which effectively abolished it, while prohibiting any other form of rent control. Under the proposal, a community could adopt rent control but would have to pay housing providers, who would have to opt in to the program, for lost rent. Tenant activists said the voluntary section, which would apply to every community in the Commonwealth, was a "sham." No municipality would adopt it, they said. The Attorney General's office concluded that the revised petition was not restricted to particular localities because it gave every municipality some legal authority it did not previously have.

Cambridge tenants formed the Campaign for Affordable Housing and Tenant Protection to oppose the effort. The Campaign argued that because rent control was primarily a local issue, and that the elected city council in Cambridge supported rent control, that it was "antidemocratic" to try and adopt a state law banning it; it was a special state law that granted Cambridge the authority to institute rent control.

=== Signatures gathered ===
The SPOA filed the initial paperwork to bring the question to the ballot in August 1993. The petition was certified on September 1, 1993; proponents then had to gather more than 70,000 signatures by November 17, 1993. The City of Cambridge challenged the certification, but the Supreme Judicial Court upheld it.

Within three weeks of certification, the newly-formed Massachusetts Homeowners Coalition had an office set up with furniture, telephones, computers, and a fax machine. They also had volunteers staffing it from 9 am to 9 pm, seven days a week.

There were volunteers from across the state who participated in the campaign. The effort was supported by The Massachusetts Association of Realators and the Massachusetts Rental Housing Association. No more than 25% of signatures could come from a single county, so organizers felt lucky that the three communities with rent control were in three different counties.

=== Court challenges ===
After the first round of signatures was filed, the Secretary of the Commonwealth determined that the petition had 69,926 allowable signatures, 360 fewer than the 70,286 required to advance the initiative. Jillson and the other original petition signers challenged the determination in Massachusetts Superior Court, arguing that enough signatures had been wrongly rejected to overcome the shortfall. Rent control supporters from Cambridge, Boston, and Brookline intervened in the case in opposition to the petition proponents. The proponents reviewed uncertified signatures and compared them with voter-registration lists, telephone books, and city directories.

During the litigation, both sides also challenged signatures that had been certified or rejected by local officials. In one episode, opponents challenged several Quincy signatures as forgeries and had them disqualified. A tenant activist asked the Attorney General to seek a criminal investigation, but received no response.

The petition proponents then submitted an affidavit from a handwriting expert stating that they were forged by one of the people opposing the petition in court. On April 22, 1994, after weeks of testimony, Judge Martha B. Sosman ruled that the petition proponents had established enough additional signatures to exceed the requirement by 34 signatures.

Separately, the City of Cambridge spent $110,000 an outside law firm to try and kill the measure. They argued that rent control was a home rule matter and not an appropriate subject for a public referendum. Tenant activists were excited the city filed the lawsuit, but the Massachusetts Homeowners Association called it a waste of taxpayer dollars.

In July, a unanimous Supreme Judicial Court of Massachusetts ruled that "although it may appear to be a purely local issue, it is not," and thus the question could appear on the ballot. Justice Ruth Abrams, who long occupied a rent-controlled apartment, recused herself from the case.

Both sides had lawsuits against the Secretary of the Commonwealth.

=== Messaging ===
During the fall campaign, the Massachusetts Homeowners Coalition framed Question 9 primarily as a fairness issue rather than only as a defense of property rights. Campaign consultant Dennis Dyer argued that the personal resentment felt by property owners affected by rent control would not necessarily persuade voters who had not shared those experiences.

Polling conducted for the campaign found that women were more likely than men to support rent control, and so the campaign emphasized fairness and assistance to small-property owners rather than relying only on arguments about property rights or economics. The campaign's central message described rent control as a well-intentioned but failed policy that benefited some affluent tenants while burdening property owners of modest means.

Campaign literature used several small-property owners to put a "face and heart" on the campaign. The campaign's principal handout featured Barbara Pilgrim, Val Jean Cox, Vinny Bologna, and Helen and Peter Petrillo, whose stories were presented as examples of small landlords burdened by Cambridge's rent control system.

- Pilgrim was an older Black woman supporting herself and her disabled husband while being unable to collect rents that covered her mortgage and other costs. The campaign also said that one of Pilgrim's tenants could afford to spend winters in Florida and summers on Cape Cod.
- Cox, also a Black woman, lost her rent-control exemption for her owner-occupied three-family house after temporarily moving out to care for her seriously ill mother.
- Bologna was unable to live with his family in a house he had renovated and, instead, the rent control board ordered him to rent out the house while he lived with his family in a one-bedroom apartment.
- The Petrillos lost an owner-occupancy exemption for a three-family house after allowing their daughter and her family to move in following a fire at the daughter's home.

The same material was included, with additional detail on rent control's effects, in press kits sent to newspaper editorial boards around the state. Only two newspapers in the state, The Boston Globe and The Patriot Ledger, opposed the ballot measure.

More libertarian messaging, including calls to get government out of people's homes, was used mainly in bumper stickers and yard signs. Some campaign participants wanted more direct attacks on prominent rent-controlled tenants, but Jillson and others worked to keep the campaign focused on Dyer's broader fairness strategy.

=== Campaign ===
By mid-October, the campaign was a sleepy one with little excitement or news coverage. When rent-control supporters held a press conference that had been planned for weeks, not a single reporter attended. Even at a meeting of the Massachusetts Municipal Association, few people seemed to know what Question 9 was. Others were confused that a No vote meant keeping rent control, and a Yes vote meant to abolish it.

Supporters of the ballot question raised $444,213 and opponents raised $62,105 by the first reporting period. This relatively small amount of money made it difficult to campaign, though supporters of Question 9 expected radio ads to being airing shortly. Proponents spent $88,000 on consultants and $3,500 on a focus group.

Many observers saw the repeal effort as difficult because it was often not just the poor and the elderly who benefited from rent control, but middle class and even wealthy renters. Proponents of the repeal argued that it kept rents artificially low, made it hard to lease a property, and made it difficult to make repairs and improvements to the property. Opponents argued that it kept prices from rising too quickly in a tight market.

== Results and aftermath ==
=== Election results ===
Election results
| Jurisdiction | Yes | No |
|---|---|---|
| Statewide | 1,034,594 | 980,723 |
| Boston | 56,539 | 64,663 |
| Brookline | 9,184 | 11,677 |
| Cambridge | 13,262 | 18,556 |

At the November 8, 1994, state election, voters approved Question 9, abolishing rent control. The measure received 1,034,594 votes in favor and 980,723 votes against, or about 51 percent to 49 percent. Officials in Boston and Brookline blamed Cambridge for failing to modify its extreme version of rent control and upsetting voters enough to ban it statewide. Cambridge City Councilor Sheila Russell, who supported rent control, agreed. "If we had only listened to [the small property owners] and helped them out in the last five years, they would never have gone to this extreme," she said.

Although the initiative passed statewide, it lost in Cambridge, where voters rejected it by 58 percent to 42 percent. It also lost in Boston, another municipality with rent control, but carried enough votes elsewhere in the state to prevail. The measure won in six eastern Massachusetts counties, including Middlesex County, where Cambridge is located.

=== Attempts to undo the election ===
Within days of the election, Boston, Brookline, and Cambridge officials all worked to overturn the election and keep rent control in their communities. On the Thursday following the vote, the Boston City Council approved a home rule petition asking to reinstate rent control. Brookline's Town Meeting also voted for a home rule petition to keep rent control two weeks later, and the Cambridge City Council sent a home rule petition to Beacon Hill the week after that.

As he had promised to do, Governor William Weld, who lived in Cambridge and voted in favor of the repeal, vetoed the Cambridge bills after both the House and the Senate approved it in lame duck sessions. The Senate rejected the Brookline bill after the House approved it, and the two chambers approved different versions of the Boston bill, forcing a conference committee.

Rent control supporters made an unsuccessful attempt to place a new measure on the 1996 state ballot. In August 1995, the Attorney General certified a proposed initiative titled the "Community Empowerment Act", which would have authorized municipalities to impose rent control among other local powers.

Supporters of Question 9 challenged the certification, arguing that the Massachusetts Constitution barred initiative petitions that were substantially the same as a measure submitted to voters in either of the two preceding biennial state elections. The challenge became moot when supporters of the Community Empowerment Act did not submit any signatures to the Secretary of the Commonwealth by the filing deadline.

=== Extension for some tenants ===
After the repeal, the Massachusetts General Court passed a law protecting low-income tenants in rent control apartments from being evicted for up to two years; full time students were not eligible. The bill was passed with less than two minutes left before the end of the legislative year on January 3, 1994. Only 9.4% of tenants in rent-controlled apartments applied for and received protection, giving credence to the assertion of opponents of rent control that it had become an entitlement program for middle- and upper-income tenants."

== Works cited ==
- Moncreiff, Robert P. (23 September 1996). "The Repeal of Rent Control in Cambridge". New England Journal of Public Policy. 12 (1).
