= Rent control in Massachusetts =

History of rent control and rent-control proposals in Massachusetts

Rent control in Massachusetts refers to laws and proposals that limit increases in rents for residential housing in Massachusetts. The state adopted temporary rent controls after World War I and World War II. Beginning in 1970, Massachusetts authorized certain municipalities to adopt local rent-control programs. By 1994, rent control remained in effect in Boston, Cambridge, and Brookline, before voters approved a statewide ballot initiative prohibiting most local rent-control laws.

Debate over rent control has continued amid housing affordability concerns. Supporters have argued that limits on rent increases can improve housing stability and reduce displacement, while opponents have argued that such limits can discourage housing production and investment and can produce unequal benefits. Surveys of economists and empirical studies have generally found that rent controls can lower rents for incumbent tenants in the short run but reduce rental supply and maintenance, driving up rental prices over time.

In 2025 and 2026, supporters advanced an initiative petition that would create the strictest rent control law in the country, but the courts ruled that as written it was ineligible for the ballot.

== Early efforts ==
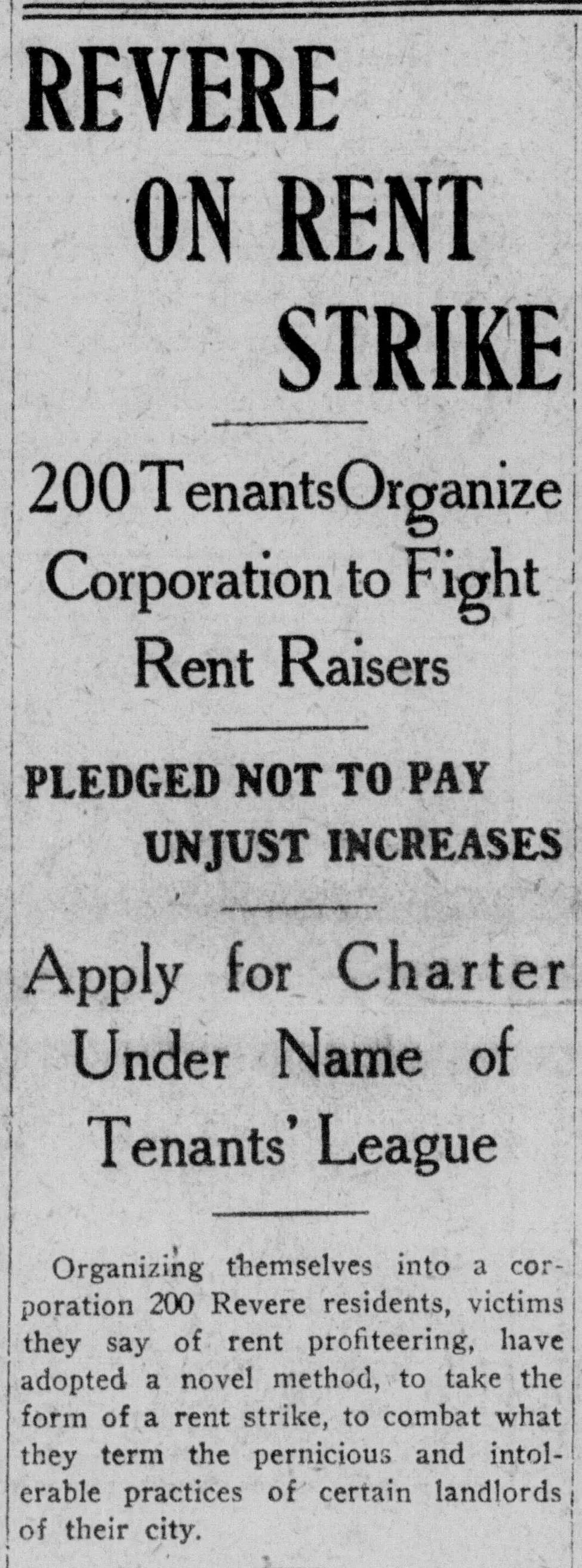
Boston Post, March 19, 1920

In 1920, as troops returned home from World War I amid an economic recession, Massachusetts experienced a tight rental market. The Great and General Court of Massachusetts adopted several laws to address the situation, including one limiting annual rent increases to no more than 25%.A subsequent state analysis found that some landlords circumvented the limits by evicting tenants or refusing to renew leases so they could charge higher rents to new tenants, while others simply raised rents by the full 25% allowed.The law expired three years later.

In response to housing shortages caused by the Great Depression and World War II, Congress enacted emergency price controls on consumer goods and rents in 1942. Although the federal controls lapsed in 1953, Massachusetts continued its own policy until 1955, when Governor Christian Herter vetoed an extension.

== Late 20th century ==
=== Campaign for rent control ===
In 1969, a group of students at Harvard University, who were also members of Students for a Democratic Society, complained that courses were taught with a 'liberal-establishment' bias and demanded courses with a more 'radical' approach. In response, the university created a course that included field work gathering signatures petitioning for rent control.

=== Legislative adoption ===
On August 30, 1970, Governor Francis W. Sargent signed into law a bill that authorized rent control in municipalities with more than 50,000 residents, potentially affecting more than 40 communities. (Note: Chapter 842 of the Acts of 1970.) The law had an expiration date of April 1974 and then was extended to December 31, 1975, and again to March 31, 1976. After April 1, 1976, special acts were passed for the municipalities who wanted rent control, but there was no state-wide authorization.

Municipalities that opted in were required to establish and administer local rent‑control programs consistent with the statute's standards. The statute froze maximum rents at the amounts charged six months before local adoption, creating an immediate rollback for units whose rents had risen during that period.

The Act applied broadly to existing rental housing but expressly exempted transient accommodations, dwellings built or converted after January 1, 1969, units already regulated under another governmental program, owner‑occupied two‑ and three‑family houses, cooperative or educational housing, and locally defined “luxury” apartments, provided no more than twenty‑five per cent of the locality's rental stock was excluded.

=== Local adoption and repeals ===
In 1969, the Town of Brookline and the City of Boston both passed local laws instituting rent control. A special law was passed giving Boston the authority to implement its proposal in the final days of 1969. The Supreme Judicial Court struck down Brookline's law, saying it had no authority to institute rent control without permission from the state.

Lynn, Somerville, Brookline, and Cambridge adopted rent control when given the chance under the state-wide law passed in 1970. Each was required by the law to establish a rent‑control board consisting of three to five members, or to appoint a single rent administrator. In 1976, hours before the statewide law expired, special laws were passed granting rent control authority to Cambridge and Somerville; Boston and Brookline had previously been granted authority earlier in the year.

The Board of Aldermen in Somerville voted, 6–4, in November 1978 to repeal its rent control law, effective March 1, 1979. There were an estimated 10,000 units under rent control at the time.

In 1974, the voters of Lynn overwhelmingly repealed rent control. Malden voters overwhelmingly rejected rent control in 1989. After a three year campaign, Greenfield rejected a proposal to adopt rent control also in 1989.

Boston began decontrolling units in 1976, allowing rents to reset when new tenants moved in, and relaxing other controls. In 1976, Somerville allowed rates to rise to market levels when new tenants moved in, but rents were subject to government control after that. Brookline began decontrolling units in 1991.

=== Rent control boards ===
Local boards in communities with rent control approved or disapproved of increases in the rent to each unit under their jurisdiction. Rent control boards were "akin to a quasi court" and had executive, legislative, and judicial powers. They passed new laws, enforced new laws, and judged whether or not their laws had been violated. The boards were empowered to set maximum rents, promulgate regulations, hold hearings, adjudicate petitions, and employ staff. Housing providers bore the burden of proof during the evidentiary hearings.

Before evicting a tenant from a rent-controlled unit, a landlord first had to secure a certificate of eviction from the board by establishing one of the statute's narrowly defined just causes:

1. non‑payment of rent;
2. the tenant's material violation of lease obligations or creation of a nuisance;
3. owner‑occupancy or occupancy by an immediate family member of the owner;
4. board‑approved plans for substantial rehabilitation or demolition; or
5. the landlord's permanent withdrawal of the dwelling from the rental market.

Hearings were recorded and extensive documentation was required contributing to a judicial atmosphere and exacerbating tensions between tenants, housing providers, the rent control boards and their examiners.

Small property owners who moved out of state needed to return to Massachusetts every time they wished to raise rents or make other changes so that they could appear in person before the rent control boards.

Board decisions were subject to de novo review in the district court, and willful overcharges or unlawful evictions were punishable as criminal offenses.

=== Fair net operating income ===
Landlords could petition for rent increases only when necessary to obtain a “fair net operating income,” a benchmark that directed boards to consider six specified factors: changes in property‑tax assessments, unavoidable increases in operating costs, capital improvements, alterations in services, physical deterioration, and the cost of normal repairs. In several instances, Rent Control Boards considered losses of $8,500 in one year and $23,000 over three years to be "a fair net profit" for the property owners.

Mortgage expenses were not allowed to be considered when calculating an approved rent. Legal and management fees were also not allowed to be passed on to tenants, and neither was lost rent due to non-payment. The chairman of the Small Property Owners Association complained this was unfair given "all the recordkeeping, minutia, logs, filings and considerable headaches associated with ownership of a rent-controlled building" and that "all owners know that to go to the rent board without legal representation is to leave without your kneecaps."

=== Repairs and upkeep ===
Landlords could not increase rent without permission, even for basic repairs and upkeep, and instead had to submit detailed requests and proposals to the Rent Control Board to "prove" that the work had been done with the cheapest possible materials. Housing providers would have to pay for repairs or to replace broken appliances and then submit receipts to the rent control boards, who were under no obligation to approve increases to recover the costs. Tenants were able to withhold rent in response to alleged faults with their units without providing any evidence.

It could take between six months and two years of adversarial hearings before the Rent Control Board for a decision to be made. If an increase in rent was approved, it could take six weeks to six months before the increase was passed on to the tenant, and it would be temporary. Rents went back down after the cost of the capital improvements were recovered by the landlord. Tenant advocates said that granting any rent increases for repairs, even temporary ones, undermined the idea of rent control itself. Dozens of tenants "stormed a City Council meeting" in Cambridge in 1992, protesting the fact that the rent control board allowed housing providers to increase rents to pay for repairs and upgrades.

When one housing provider spent over $200,000 in capital improvements on his property, the Cambridge Rent Control Board refused to allow him to raise rents to cover the expenses. Not all of the repairs were required, the Board said, because new electrical and water service were not mandated by building or safety codes. The owner sued, and a Superior Court justice ruled that the Board was imposing criteria not found in the regulations; she ruled in favor of the housing provider.

Because of delays in processing applications, inflation ate away at the amount landlords could ultimately collect in rent increases for capital improvements. Economist Herman B. Leonard of Harvard Business School found that landlords received between 70% and 75% of what the Rent Control Board deemed to be "fair." This, he said, was a "dramatic squeeze" on operating budgets, and led to less upkeep, lower quality, and faster deterioration of rent-controlled properties.

=== Vacancy decontrol ===
Over time, Boston and Brookline instituted systems of vacancy decontrol where rents could rise to market levels as tenants moved out, but Cambridge strengthened its program over the years. Like in similar communities across the country, complaints were heard from both landlords and tenants in all three communities, but "the discontent is nowhere near as fierce as in places where stringent rent control measures remain intact."

== Rent control in Boston ==
Rent-controlled units in Boston
Date	Number of rent-controlled units	Notes
Early 1970s	110,000	
1975	120,000	
1976	122,000	(Note: Vacancy decontrol began on January 1, 1976. As apartments turned over, they could be removed from rent control.)
1977	74,000	(Note: There were 140,000 tenants in rent-controlled apartments.)
February 1980	8,000 buildings had rent-controlled units	
January 1981	45,000 units	
December 1981	35,000-40,000 units	
January 1988	80,000+ units	(Note: Roughly half of all units in the city were under some form of rent control.)
February 1989	90,000 units	
December 1990	95,000 units	
June 1993	20,000 units	
1994	22,000 units	(Note: There were an additional 63,000 units that were vacancy decontrolled.)

Mayor Kevin White signed Boston's first rent control ordinance in November 1969, and a special state law authorized the city to implement it. The ordinance established a five-member Rent Control Board with authority to set maximum rents for covered apartments. Boston amended its program after Massachusetts enacted statewide enabling legislation in 1970, and the board was subsequently given authority to consider rent increases, regulate evictions, and determine whether properties qualified for exemptions.

The city introduced vacancy decontrol in 1976, allowing rents to rise to market levels when tenants moved out. Decontrol was not automatic, however, and property owners had to obtain certificates from the Rent Control Board before charging the new rents. Boston continued to regulate rent increases and adopted restrictions intended to prevent owners from removing rental units from the market or converting them into condominiums.

Reports in The Boston Globe described a cycle in lower-income neighborhoods in which regulated rents that did not cover operating costs contributed to deferred maintenance, unpaid property taxes, vacancies, and building abandonment. Because the taxes owed sometimes exceeded the value of the properties, owners abandoned some buildings rather than repair them. Vacant buildings were subsequently demolished or destroyed by fire, contributing to urban blight. The Globe also reported allegations that Boston's rent-control and condominium-conversion laws created incentives for some owners and lenders to use arson to dispose of financially distressed properties.

Regulated rents did not always keep pace with taxes, utilities, mortgage payments, and maintenance expenses, and some federally insured developments entered foreclosure. Reduced property values lowered municipal tax assessments and shifted some of the tax burden to homeowners and unregulated properties. Because eligibility was not based on income, rent-controlled apartments were occupied by tenants across the income distribution, including middle- and upper-income households.

In June 1993, the Boston City Council voted to extend rent control through 2004. The program instead ended after Massachusetts voters approved Question 9 in November 1994, prohibiting most local rent-control laws. Although the proposal was rejected by Boston voters, it passed statewide and took effect on January 1, 1995. The Boston City Council subsequently sought state authorization to restore rent control, but the effort was unsuccessful.

== Rent control in Brookline ==
Rent-controlled units in Brookline
Date	Number of rent-controlled units	Notes
1970	12,000	
1975	11,400	
1984	8,000	(Note: About 57% of all rental units were rent-controlled.)
1988	8,000	
1990	4,000-7,000	
1991	7,200	
1994	4,000-4,500	

Brookline adopted a rent-control measure in 1969, but the Massachusetts Supreme Judicial Court struck it down in 1970 because the town lacked authorization from the state. After the legislature granted that authority, Town Meeting adopted a new bylaw in September 1970 covering about 12,000 rental units.

Brookline's Rent Control Board regulated rent increases and reviewed requests to evict tenants or remove apartments from the rental market. As owners converted rental apartments to condominiums, the town imposed restrictions on conversions and related evictions. Disputes over rent increases, property assessments and taxes, and the presence of wealthy tenants in rent-controlled apartments became prominent in local politics.

After opponents of rent control gained seats in the 1990 town election, Town Meeting voted to phase out controls on some apartments while retaining protections for certain tenants. Rent control in Brookline ended when a statewide repeal took effect in 1995, although Brookline voters had opposed the repeal.

== Rent control in Cambridge ==
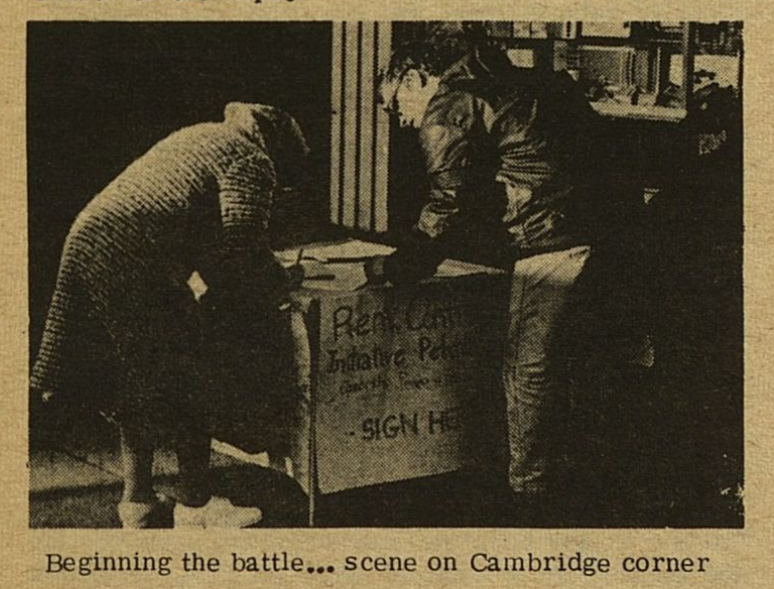
The Cambridge Peace & Freedom Party (Cambridge MDS) (Note: The party was disbanded in 1970.) tabling circa 1968/1969 as part of their broader effort to get 3,400 signatures to put rent control on the ballot.

Rent-controlled units in Cambridge
Date	Number of rent-controlled units	Notes
1970	20,000	
1975	22,000	
1979	23,000	
1983	20,000	(Note: About 2/3 of all rental units were rent-controlled.)
1985	18,000+	(Note: This was 50% of all the total rental market.)
1986	17,000	
1987	17,116	
1989	12,500	
1990	16,182	(Note: There were 5,010 rent-controlled buildings.)
1991	17,000	(Note: This was roughly half of the rental stock.)
1992	17,000	
1994	14,415 apartments & 1,963 condos	(Note: This amounted to half of all units.)

The Cambridge City Council adopted rent control on September 17, 1970, rolling rents back to their March 1970 levels and requiring government approval for subsequent increases. A lame-duck council repealed the system in December 1971, but the newly elected council restored it in January 1972. The system remained in effect until the statewide repeal of rent control took effect on January 1, 1995.

Cambridge maintained a substantially stricter system than Boston and Brookline. While those communities eventually allowed rents to rise to market levels when tenants moved out, Cambridge generally continued regulating covered apartments between tenancies. Its rules also restricted condominium conversions, owner occupancy, evictions, and the removal of units from the rental market. Contemporary accounts described Cambridge's program as the strictest in Massachusetts and, in one instance, as the nation's most “Draconian” form of rent control.

The five-member Cambridge Rent Control Board consisted of two landlords, two tenants, and a chairman intended to be impartial. It set maximum rents, considered applications for increases, regulated evictions, and determined whether apartments could be removed from the rental market.

Landlords seeking increases for repairs or capital improvements had to document their expenses and demonstrate that an increase was necessary to provide a fair net operating income. Supporters said these regulations preserved rental housing and protected tenants from displacement. Opponents argued that the board exercised excessive authority, prevented some owners from occupying or selling their own units, and made it financially difficult to maintain regulated properties.

Controlled rents were substantially lower than market rents, providing incumbent tenants with housing stability and protection from rising prices. The system was not means-tested, however, and studies found that many rent-controlled apartments were occupied by middle- and upper-income tenants, including large numbers of professionals, the City's mayor, and even European royalty.

Critics described the program as an entitlement for the well-connected or affluent, while tenant organizations opposed means-testing on the grounds that it would weaken rent control and divide tenants. The disparity between controlled and market rents also discouraged tenants from moving, even when their apartments no longer suited their needs.

Contemporary studies linked Cambridge's system to reduced housing construction, condominium conversions, deferred maintenance, and deterioration of the housing stock. Property owners said that delays and limits on rent increases prevented them from recovering the cost of repairs, while banks were reluctant to lend against buildings whose income and assessed values were restricted.

Reports also associated financially distressed and abandoned buildings with urban blight, demolition, and fires. Because rent-controlled properties had lower assessed values, homeowners and owners of uncontrolled properties bore a larger share of the city's property-tax burden. The city responded with rehabilitation loans, inspections, and surcharges on dilapidated buildings.

Opposition among small property owners led to the formation of the Small Property Owners Association, which played a leading role in placing the statewide repeal measure on the 1994 ballot. Although Cambridge voters rejected repeal by 58% to 42%, the measure passed statewide. Following repeal, rents rose for many tenants in formerly controlled apartments, and some tenants moved or were replaced by more affluent renters.

Residential investment, renovations, and construction subsequently increased, while tax revenue from building permits tripled. Cambridge property values increased by approximately $7.8 billion during the following decade; researchers attributed roughly $2 billion of that increase to the end of rent control, including gains to properties that had never been controlled but which increased in value when the formerly rent-controlled properties around them began to be improved.

== Rent control in Lynn ==
In 1970, after the state law was passed, Lynn's city council adopted rent control. In 1974, the voters of that city overwhelmingly repealed it. In 1976, a question was placed on the ballot in Lynn to determine if voters wanted to re-institute rent control.

During that time, many housing providers, who were "squeezed by rent control and bad economic times, resorted to arson." According to Fire Chief Curtis T. Numberg, Lynn "had major problems. We burned down a good portion of the city."

== Effects on housing stocks ==
=== Deteriorating buildings ===
Tenants in rent-controlled units paid 40% below market rates on their units, and the value of properties was diminished by 45%. The difficulty of recovering costs discouraged the development of new buildings, and basic upkeep of existing buildings went undone. Many tenants with the lowest rents lived in buildings with "leaky roofs, falling gutters, makeshift and unsanitary bathrooms and no central heating."

The chairman of the Small Property Owners Association said that "it's basic economics" that "buildings that are cash-starved will gradually deteriorate" as property owners can't afford to replace heating or electrical systems or roofs and windows when they reach the end of their natural lives. Banks were hesitant to lend to owners of buildings that were rent-controlled, making it even more difficult for owners to make repairs. The value of the properties was also diminished, lowering the borrowing power of owners of rent-controlled buildings.

The City of Cambridge, recognizing that banks would not loan to owners of rent-controlled buildings, interceded with local banks to set up a loan fund at 11.5% interest. The chairman of the Small Properties Owners Association opined that the need for a special fund was confirmation from the City that "our rents are too low to give us any cash reserve to handle" repairs and renovations to their properties.

=== Urban blight ===
When properties that were under rent control fell into disrepair, they negatively impacted the property values of the buildings around them.

In a 1975 study of the effects of rent control in Massachusetts, George Sternlieb, the founder of the Rutgers University Center for Urban Policy Research, said that the loss of rental income would lead to a loss of "much of [the state's] housing investment." This was especially true communities like Boston and Cambridge, who had older housing stock and which would become a "wasted asset." In 1988, the City of Cambridge estimated that it would cost between $40,000 and $60,000 to renovate most rent-controlled apartments.

The Boston Rent Control Board slashed rents on one owner's properties by 2/3, bringing the total income on 8 units to $1,281. The property fell into disrepair with $150,000 worth of repairs needed. The bank that held the mortgage note tried to auction it off, but there were no bidders. Another building in the Bay Bay had a mortgage of $250,000 but, when the bank which foreclosed upon it asked for $205,000, they could not sell it.

In 1985, Boston mayor Ray Flynn ordered a survey of all boarded-up buildings in Boston. By the time rent control ended in Boston, there were more than 10,000 vacant units in that city.

=== Decrease in rental units ===
By 1975, the Greater Boston Real Estate Board said the industry was "extremely sick" and blamed the problem on real estate taxes and rent control. The next year, they reported that rent control, condominium conversion laws, and other factors "virtually stopped construction in some markets." According to the National Bureau of Economic Research, the number of rental units was reduced by 15% and tenants were 8-9% less likely to move due to rent control.

Only two buildings of apartments had been built in the city of Boston with conventional financing in 1974. The income buildings could produce under rent control, the Board said, was not enough to cover its expenses. Only five of 31 Boston-area banks surveyed that year said they would finance the construction of new apartments if they would be subject to rent control.

By 1977, developers had stopped asking banks for loans and the only apartments being built were financed with federal- or state-insured mortgages, rent subsidies, or "tandem mortgages" where federal-oriented financial agencies bought mortgages. John Hancock Mutual Life Insurance Company reported that they were financing apartments in other parts of the country but, with rent control and taxes in Massachusetts, it did not make "economical sense to build conventionally."

Prior to rent control, financing the construction of apartments made up 67% of John Hancock's portfolio but, by 1976, it dropped to 7.3% Instead, they turned to office buildings, shopping centers, hotels, and industrial properties "where rents are automatically escalated to keep up with operating costs."

At a meeting of the Massachusetts Mortgage Bankers in 1978, the speaker on conventional financing of multi-family residential homes said "there is none. Our firm has not provided one unit of financing in the past two years and has not been asked to." Developers said the fear that rents might be controlled in the future, even if they were exempt at the time, prevented them from building apartments.

During the 1980s, the number of available rental units shrank. In 1980, there were roughly 150,000 privately owned rental units in Boston but, by 1987, that number dropped to 122,350. In Cambridge, construction of new housing "was nonexistent" during the rent control era.

=== Condominium conversions ===
In the 1970s, conversions of apartments to condominiums began to take off. During the first 7 years of rent control, 5,000 rent-controlled apartments were converted in Boston, Brookline, and Cambridge. According to the Boston Globe, it was "because sizable profits can be made and because rent control... inhibits rental income and can give landlords other headaches as well."

The Rental Housing Association of the Greater Boston Real Estate Board said in 1975 that condos "are such a logical outgrowth of rent control and runaway inflation that they must be reckoned with." By 1983, the four communities that had rent control were those that saw the highest number of rental units converted into condominiums.

To prevent further conversions, those communities began requiring permission from the local rent control board to remove the unit from the rental housing market. The Boston Globe described the condominium-permit systems in Brookline and Cambridge as a "confusing maze of regulations," with overlapping exemptions, changing timetables, and lawsuits. Officials in Brookline and Cambridge called the rules simple in theory, but also acknowledged that the process had become difficult to explain.

Supporters said the permit systems preserved rental housing by preventing apartments from being converted one by one into owner-occupied condominiums. Opponents argued that the restrictions made it harder for moderate-income buyers to purchase converted apartments and limited owners' ability to sell their property. By 1988, few apartment buildings in communities with rent control were being converted to condominiums, which supporters described as evidence that the regulations were working.

== Financial effects of rent control ==
Economists have come to a "rare consensus" on the issue of rent control: it reduces the supply of rental housing, the existing housing stock deteriorates, and a community's property tax base is eroded. There are also secondary problems, including administrative costs, unemployment due to tenant inmobility, increased energy consumption, and discrimination against tenants.

According to Commonwealth Magazine, the history of rent control in Massachusetts and around the nation "paints a consistent picture of market distortions and unintended, often inequitable, consequences." Robert Kuttner, the liberal columnist, said that rent control "creates a two-tier housing market where a controlled building contains outlandish bargains while an uncontrolled building across the street commands astronomical 'market' rents."

Through rent control, those who owned their own homes subsidized the rents of those who occupied rent-controlled apartments in the form of higher taxes.

=== Disparity between rents and operating costs ===
During the first three years of rent control, 1970 to 1973, the rents in rent-controlled apartments rose 6.7%. The cost to maintain and operate apartments during that period was more than double that. In 1973, fewer than 12% of tenants in rent-controlled apartments saw their rent go up. Costs for landlords rose 8% that year.

From 1970 to 1978, costs to maintain rental properties rose 84.5%; the Rent Control Board in Boston raised rents 67.5%. According to the Boston Globe, a disproportionate share of the costs of rent control is borne by the landlord. No other business is regulated in the same often arbitrary way."

The Boston Gas Company was owed more than $500,000 in unpaid bills by 137 housing developments in 1975 and told the Department of Public Utilities of their intention to turn off the heat and hot water on more than 13,000 units and 38,000 mostly low-income tenants. They developments, which were constructed in the 1960s, were "drastically behind in mortgage payments, paying utility bills and taking care of needed maintenance."

Property managed testified that the amount of income coming in was insufficient to meet their costs and, because of rent control, they were unable to raise the rents. Many properties were in default, and some had already been foreclosed upon. One of the developers wanted to give up the properties and had asked HUD to take over the buildings, but the federal agency refused.

=== HUD programs ===
When rent control was first instituted in Massachusetts, federally subsidized housing developments were placed under the purview of local rent control boards. In 1975, H.R. Crawford of the Department of Housing and Urban Development (HUD) issued new regulations exempting them from rent control, saying that the government needed to protect its $1 billion investment in housing stock.

Properties that were insured under a 1983 HUD program were able, in some circumstances, to bypass local rent control boards. By having HUD insure the properties, lenders loaned money to property developers at lower rates, leading to lower rents.

However, if a landlord could not make the payments because the rents allowed by rent control boards was too low, then HUD would make partial payments to the lenders to keep the properties from defaulting and going into foreclosure. HUD could preempt local rent control boards and allow for higher rents in order to protect taxpayers from having to pay on defaulted loans.

==== Foreclosure ====
Housing projects under rent control were unable to make their mortgage payments, putting them in danger of foreclosure. In Boston alone, there were 13,787 units that were protected by HUD's mortgage protection program. By 1975, more than half of them reverted to the government by 1977 because the owners defaulted and the banks collected their mortgage insurance.

According to Crawford, "local rent control is a significant factor in causing owners of Federal Housing Administration projects, especially subsidized projects, to default on their mortgage payments."

One owner with a HUD-backed mortgage was Boston Celtics player Satch Sanders. He bought a dilapidated building in Dorchester with rats and leaks "for the social thing," believing that Black residents should do more to help their own community. He eventually obtained 82 units throughout Dorchester and Roxbury but, "from a business standpoint, it was a disaster."

His utility bills were higher than the rents he brought in and, by the time the Rent Control Board approved one increase, he was in need of another. The bank foreclosed on him and HUD took over ownership.

=== Redistribution of state aid and tax burden ===
Because rent-controlled apartments fell into disrepair, and because properties that generate less income are less valuable, they were assessed lower. The total tax assessment in communities with rent control declined. Because municipalities lost tax revenue due to the lower assessments, state aid to communities with rent control increased, forcing communities without rent control to subsidize those who had it.

When a unit in Boston's Back Bay was converted from a rent-controlled apartment to a condo, its tax assessment nearly tripled. In Brookline, when a rent-controlled apartment was converted, tax revenue increased 28%.

For every dollar in rent that tenants saved, municipalities lost 30 cents in tax revenue. If a rent-controlled apartment was rented for $25 a month less than the market rate, the city lost $90 a year in revenue. Homeowners, in the form of higher property taxes, also subsidized the rents of those in rent-controlled apartments, according to economists.

Rents also rose on tenants in non-rent-controlled units. The tax burden also shifted to rental properties not under rent control. Landlords were then free to pass these costs on to their tenants.

=== Difficulty selling rent-controlled homes ===
In 1976, during an upturn for the real estate market generally, rent-controlled properties suffered. They were, according to one real estate professional, "proving to be highly difficult to sell at a reasonable figure because of a limitation on their income."

== Societal effects of rent control ==
=== Lack of means-testing ===
There was no requirement that rent-controlled apartments be rented to low-income tenants; at least 20 percent of all rent-controlled apartments housed the rich. The vast majority housed middle- and high-income earners, with the majority going to people with professional, technical, and managerial jobs. Many tenants were wealthier than their landlords.

A study by Rolf Goetze titled "Rent Control: Affordable Housing for the Privileged, Not The Poor" found in August 1994 that the median income per tenant in a rent-controlled apartment was $1,060 more than it was in a market rate apartment. Tenant advocacy organizations opposed means-testing.

According to MIT economist Jonathan Gruber, the reason that rent-controlled apartments tend to go to the rich is that they already have well-paying jobs. It is the poor who move from place to place in search of better opportunities, which means they lose out on the benefits of a rent-controlled apartment. "It really was a bad idea, and it continues to be a bad idea," Gruber said. "It's against basic economics."

=== Racial disparities ===
According to MassLandlords, despite making up 25% of the population of Cambridge, only 12% of rent-controlled apartments in Cambridge housed people of color. The scarcity of housing hit families, and Black families especially, the hardest.

=== Worsened climate change ===
Landlords were not allowed to charge tenants the actual cost of the heating and cooling bills. In one building in Cambridge, the rent control board set an allowance in 1979 of 1,038 gallons of heating oil a year. By 1983, when the rent control board allowed an increase in rent to account for more oil, tenants were burning 4,730 gallons a year. In that four-year span, an extra 12,000 gallons of oil were burned and 122 tons of carbon dioxide were emitted into the atmosphere.

A study in the International Journal of Housing Policy found that rent control can make it harder to reduce carbon emissions from buildings as many energy-saving upgrades, such as better insulation, new windows, or more efficient heating systems, pose a significant upfront expense. Landlords are usually responsible for paying for these improvements, but tenants often receive much of the benefit through lower energy bills. When rent control limits a landlord's ability to raise rents and recover the cost of these upgrades, landlords may be less willing to invest in them. As a result, older buildings may use more energy and produce more greenhouse gas emissions.

Because tenants become "lockled-in" and are less likely to move lest they lose their below market rents, they often have longer commutes when they take new jobs. This leads to more time in the car and more gasoline emissions.

== Statewide repeal ==
In November 1994, Massachusetts voters approved Question 9, a statewide initiative that ended the existing rent-control programs in Boston, Brookline, and Cambridge, effective January 1, 1995. The measure passed by approximately 51 percent to 49 percent, although a majority of voters in all three municipalities opposed it. It prohibited most local rent-control laws while permitting voluntary programs that compensated participating property owners for lost rental income.

The repeal effort originated with Cambridge’s Small Property Owners Association after unsuccessful attempts to reform the city’s extremely strict system through local government, litigation, and state legislation. Campaigners argued that rent control discouraged maintenance and investment, restricted owners’ use of their properties, and benefited some affluent tenants at the expense of landlords of modest means. Opponents maintained that it preserved affordable housing and protected tenants from displacement, and objected to statewide voters overriding local housing policies. Court challenges to the petition’s signatures and eligibility were unsuccessful, allowing the question onto the ballot.

After the vote, officials in the three affected municipalities unsuccessfully sought legislation preserving their programs. The Massachusetts General Court also passed a law protecting low-income tenants in rent control apartments from being evicted for up to two years. Only 9.4% of tenants in rent-controlled apartments applied for and received protection, giving credence to the assertion of opponents of rent control that it had become an entitlement program for middle- and upper-income tenants."

An effort to place a measure restoring municipal rent-control authority on the 1996 ballot failed to gather the required signatures.

== 21st century ==
Massachusetts has one of the lowest rates of new housing production anywhere in the country. In the years between 2012 and 2024, the rise in the median gross rent in Massachusetts rose nearly 30% faster than the median household income did across the Commonwealth. From 2000 to 2024, rent grew about 1% more per year than the consumer price index. In response, some have called for a return to rent control as a way to prevent tenants from being evicted and neighborhoods from becoming gentrified.

At the same time, the costs landlords have to maintain their properties grew even faster. In 2023 alone, property insurance rose 26%.

There is "a general consensus among economists" that instituting rent control would not solve the affordable housing crisis facing the state. The Brookings Institution wrote that "while rent control appears to help current tenants in the short run, in the long run it decreases affordability, fuels gentrification, and creates negative spillovers on the surrounding neighborhood."

=== Local efforts ===
At a special town meeting in November 2023, the Brookline Town Meeting passed a home rule petition seeking to implement rent control by a vote of 112 to 107, with 13 abstentions. Rents could rise by the rate of inflation plus 3%, but could not exceed 7%. The baseline would be the rent 12 months before passage. Owner-occupied properties with four units or fewer would be exempt.

Mayor Michelle Wu proposed re-instituting rent control in Boston via a home rule petition in 2023. Her proposal was criticized by both the real estate community, which opposes any form of rent control, and rent control advocates for not going far enough. The Boston Real Estate Board launched a campaign to oppose Wu's measure, saying it will discourage housing production in a city and a region that already has an acute shortage, will make maintaining properties more difficult, and will hurt tax revenues. The measure did not pass.

=== Legislative efforts ===
State representative Mike Connolly has proposed bills to restore rent control in the Massachusetts House of Representatives for years without success. In a 2020 effort, Connolly proposed a rent control measure as an amendment to an economic development bill in the House; it failed 22–136. During the 2019–2020 Massachusetts legislature, state representative Dave Rogers presented a bill to enable municipalities to enact rent control. The bill received a favorable report from the committee on Housing and was referred to committee on House Steering, Policy and Scheduling, but no further action was taken during the legislative session.

Rogers, along with state representative Sam Montaño, presented a similar bill during the 2023–2024 Massachusetts legislature. The committee on Housing authorized a study order on the bill. The bill was reintroduced during the 2025–2026 Massachusetts legislature. State senator Patricia D. Jehlen presented related bills during the 2021–2022, 2023–2024, and 2025–2026 legislative sessions.

=== 2023 ballot measure ===
In 2023, Connolly organized a last-minute-effort to restore rent control via ballot initiative at the 2024 Massachusetts election. He suspended the campaign several months later when he only received 10,000 of the 75,000 signatures needed to put it on the ballot.

=== 2026 ballot measure ===
A ballot proposal to re-institute rent control was proposed for the 2026 Massachusetts ballot. (Note: In September 2025, Attorney General Andrea Campbell verified a ballot petition to implement rent control across the state, allowing supporters to collect nearly 75,000 signatures to put the measure on the ballot. In November 2025, supporters claimed they collected enough signatures to move it forward in the process.) If adopted, it would have become the strictest rent control law in the country. Unlike the previous version of rent control, in which individual cities and towns could choose whether or not they wanted to have rent control, this measure would cap rent increases at the rate of inflation, or 5% a year, whichever is lower, across the entire Commonwealth. The real estate industry pledged to spend $30 million against the measure. The coalition Keep Massachusetts Home, formed in support of the measure, reported $57,000 raised in 2025 year-end campaign finance reports.

On June 23, 2026, the Supreme Judicial Court disallowed the question from appearing on the ballot. The Court said the exemption in the proposed law for religious institutions violated the Massachusetts Constitution because, "to enforce the proposed law, the exemption would require the government to determine if a facility is ‘operated solely for... religious... purposes,’ and then make an enforcement decision based on the facility’s religious purpose (or lack thereof)." Supporters called the ruling a "massive disappointment" and said "the issue raised by the court is easily fixable and doesn’t effect the substance of our proposal." They pledged to bring it back at a future election.

==== Market reactions ====
After the ballot question was certified, Governor Maura Healey announced that funding had been pulled for multiple housing projects representing thousands of new units, with funding flowing instead to projects in other states without rent control. In March 2026, National Real Estate Advisors, who had previously invested billions of dollars in Massachusetts over the prior 20 years, announced that they would stop investing in Massachusetts because of the prospect of rent control returning. The proposed ballot measure would exempt new construction for 10 years; developers of multifamily housing base their projects on timelines of between 20 and 40 years.

Other developers have announced they will stop building in Massachusetts if the measure were to pass. Banks also reported a "sharp drop" in the number of loans to build multifamily housing because of concerns about the ballot measure. Developers are telling the banks that "[w]e don’t have to invest in Massachusetts. We can invest in Connecticut or New York."

According to Cabot, Cabot & Forbes, "the prospect of rent control has effectively suspended investor appetite for new investments in Massachusetts." The company's CEO, Jay Doherty, said that investors, which include pension funds, endowments, and bundles of private investors, "will not even look at [a CC&F] project" because the returns would be too low with rent control. "Rent control is just another piece of iron rebar on the camel’s back," according to Doherty.

==== Economic projections ====
A report from the Greater Boston Real Estate Board and the Center for State Policy Analysis at Tufts University found that adoption of the law would trigger a "fiscal tsunami" by wiping out $300 billion from home and property values. This, in turn, would cause a "cascade of effects" by reducing how much municipalities were able to take in property taxes, leading to cuts to services in urban areas and rural areas alike. Because the value of apartments would decrease, and because landlords would have less money to invest in them, buildings would begin to deteriorate. This would reduce the value of the homes around it, and decrease the tax base as a result.

According to Worcester mayor Joseph Petty, removing this much of the tax base would be "catastrophic to local municipal budgets." The mayor predicts that Worcester would lose 18.53% of the city’s property value by 2036 if the measure passed. This would require the residential tax rate to increase by 22.74%.

"Rent control would devalue properties with crushing effects on our budgets that support teachers and education, police, fire, and public safety, and infrastructure maintenance and improvement in our cities and towns," according to Methuen Mayor D.J. Beauregard.

A study by the Fiscal Alliance Foundation found that homeowners would see a 6% increase in the tax rate as more value was placed on owner-occupied properties and values fell on rental units. In Boston, tax rates on the average home would rise by $1,117, in Lowell by $570, and in Amherst by $889. Paul Craney, the executive director of the Fiscal Alliance Foundation, calls the proposal "a tax increase on homeowners."

Wealthy renters would benefit more from rent control than poorer renters would in pure dollar amount terms because the base rent is already higher. The economic benefit of rent control would flow from landlords to those who are already renting apartments, and not to those most in need.

==== Public opinion ====
A poll conducted by Suffolk University in November 2025 found 62.6% of all respondents supported capping rent increases, with 30.6% opposed. A poll in February 2026 found 56% in favor.

==== Politicians in favor ====
Boston mayor Michelle Wu considered the measure imperfect, but planned to vote for it, citing the need to make housing more affordable. Other officials in Cambridge and Somerville have also voiced support for the initiative. The Homes for All coalition was formed to support the measure.

==== Politicians opposed ====
Governor Maura Healey opposed the ballot measure, saying that if “you look at the studies, you effectively halt production” with rent control. Others who supported rent control in general opposed this particular measure, saying that "as proposed, this ballot question is a terrible idea."

A group of 12 mayors, including those from some of the Commonwealth's densest cities and those with the highest population of renters, opposed the measure. They cited its likely effect of slowing down housing production, the negative impacts it would have on municipal budgets, and how it would ultimately hurt, not help, the effort to bring down housing prices. The cons, they say, outweighed the pros, making it counterproductive. Worcester mayor Joseph Petty opposed the measure, saying it would have "disastrous consequences."

==== Business groups opposed ====
The non-partisan, business-backed Massachusetts Taxpayers Foundation declared that passage would result in "worsening the housing shortage in Massachusetts and degrading the existing housing stock. Rent control should not be adopted because it will exacerbate housing shortages, drive up housing costs, and increase property taxes for homeowners."

The Worcester Chamber of Commerce opposed the measure question because of "the significant harm it [would] inflict on the housing development pipeline across Worcester and Central Massachusetts." In February 2026, a campaign opposing the ballot measure, Housing for Massachusetts, was launched. The chairman of Housing for Massachusetts called the ballot question "the nation’s most extreme rent control proposal."

==== Proposed compromise ====
On June 3, rent control advocates claimed they had reached a compromise with opponents to drop the ballot measure push and implement a less strict version through the state legislature. The proposed compromise had some similarities to Boston mayor Michelle Wu's previous rent control proposal. The compromise would have allowed individual municipalities to opt in to rent control, rather than enforcing it statewide, as the ballot measure would.

While some groups which had opposed the measure agreed to the compromise, Housing for Massachusetts, the committee formed to oppose the ballot measure, denied that any deal had been reached. Some rent control advocates also opposed the compromise, saying it was not strict enough and that they were not consulted before a compromise was proposed.

The proposed compromise was endorsed by Michelle Wu. Governor Maura Healey stated that she supported a compromise, but she did not endorse the specific proposal put forth by organizers.

== Mobile homes ==
Peabody adopted the first rent control law for mobile homes in 1977. Several other towns did the same in the 1970s and 1980s. This includes Middleborough, which adopted rent control for trailer parks in the late 1980s.

The owner of a mobile home part in West Bridgewater announced plans to close the park in 1992 because the land was more valuable vacant than it was as a mobile home park with rent control. A dozen other parks announced their closures in the early 1990s.

A special state law passed in 2013 gives the West Stockbridge Board of Selectmen, acting as the Rent Control Board, the power to regulate rents at trailer parks.

== Works cited ==
- Bloom, Robert M. (1 January 1974). "Chapter 19: Rent Control". Annual Survey of Massachusetts Law. 1974 (1).
- Moncreiff, Robert P. (23 September 1996). "The Repeal of Rent Control in Cambridge". New England Journal of Public Policy. 12 (1).
