= Rent control in Boston, Massachusetts =

Rent control in Boston, Massachusetts was a system of municipal regulations that limited rents and evictions in certain privately owned rental housing. Boston adopted rent control in 1969 amid a housing shortage, and the Massachusetts Legislature authorized similar programs in larger municipalities the following year. The system remained in effect until Massachusetts voters abolished rent control through a statewide ballot initiative in 1994, with repeal taking effect on January 1, 1995.

Boston's Rent Control Board established maximum rents, considered landlords' applications for increases, regulated evictions, and determined which properties qualified for exemptions. The law was repeatedly amended during its 25-year history. Vacancy decontrol, adopted in 1976, permitted rents to be reset when tenants moved out, although property owners were required to obtain certificates from the board. The city also adopted regulations intended to prevent landlords from removing apartments and boarding-house rooms from the rental market or converting them into condominiums.

Supporters maintained that rent control protected tenants from steep rent increases and displacement during periods of limited housing availability. Critics attributed reductions in rental housing, decreased construction, condominium conversions, building deterioration, and property abandonment partly to regulated rents that did not keep pace with taxes, utilities, mortgages, and maintenance costs. Rent-controlled apartments were not means-tested, and studies found that many were occupied by middle- and upper-income tenants. The policy was also associated with lower property assessments, increased tax burdens on other property owners, and reduced mobility among tenants who did not want to lose below-market rents.

== Legislative history ==
=== Local adoption ===
Mayor Kevin White signed into law a rent control ordinance in November 1969. (Note: At the time he signed the ordinance, White proposed amendments to the law that would exempt college dormitories and enable the board to take action against landlords on their own, instead of waiting for complaints from tenants.) It established a five-member rent control board that had the power to set rents in about 25% of all rental units, excluding luxury units, public housing, and buildings with three or fewer units. A special state law granting the City permission to implement the ordinance was enacted in the final days of the 1969 legislative session.

=== Statewide law ===
On August 30, 1970, Governor Francis W. Sargent signed into law a bill that authorized rent control in municipalities with more than 50,000 residents, potentially affecting more than 40 communities. (Note: Chapter 842 of the Acts of 1970.) The law had an expiration date of April 1974 and then was extended to December 31, 1975, and again to March 31, 1976. After April 1, 1976, special acts were passed for Boston and the two other municipalities who wanted rent control, but there was no state-wide authorization.

Municipalities that opted in were required to establish and administer local rent‑control programs consistent with the statute's standards. The statute froze maximum rents at the amounts charged six months before local adoption, creating an immediate rollback for units whose rents had risen during that period.

The Act applied broadly to existing rental housing but expressly exempted transient accommodations, dwellings built or converted after January 1, 1969, units already regulated under another governmental program, owner‑occupied two‑ and three‑family houses, cooperative or educational housing, and locally defined "luxury" apartments, provided no more than 25% of the locality's rental stock was excluded.

=== 1970s ===
The local ordinance was amended a few months after adoption to make it more closely match the legislation enabling rent control in the rest of the Commonwealth. The law was considered weak as a tenant had to first complain to the Rent Control Board before an action could be taken against a housing provider. Two years later, a stronger ordinance was adopted.

==== Vacancy decontrol ====
On New Year's Day in 1976, White signed a new bill extending rent control for another four years. It strengthened the power of the Rent Control Board and weakened the power of the administrator. (Note: The statewide rent control enabling legislation expired a few weeks later. This new law controlled.) It also allowed for the deregulation of apartments as they became vacant, allowing rents to reset when new tenants moved in. The law had an expiration date of December 31, 1979 but was extended for three more years.

However, decontrol was not automatic. The Rent Control Board established "a comprehensive set of rules and regulations" that owners must follow in order to obtain a "certificate of vacancy." Part of the application process involved submitting signed affidavits from both the housing provider and the tenant moving out.

The Rent Control Board took several months to consider and approve applications for decontrol permits due to a backlog and a lack of personnel to process requests. While waiting for the paperwork to be processed, units could not be rented and property owners lost money. Until the housing provider had the certificate, the Board considered the apartment to still be under the previous rules and rents could not be raised for the new tenants.

Confusion over the need for permits, which were mandated months after vacancy decontrol took effect, led to some tenants being charged higher rents before a certificate was obtained. In March 1977, the Rent Control Board ordered housing providers to repay tenants in 183 different buildings a total of $24,130. There were 14 who were expected to be referred to the Boston Housing Court. Most of the complaints involved small landlords with three or fewer buildings.

In the 2.5 years after vacancy decontrol began, 40,000 units were removed from rent control. By the end of 1978, 35-40% of all rent-controlled apartments had been decontrolled.

=== 1977 study ===
A 1977 study group appointed by Mayor White produced an 80-page report in which it was recommended that rent control be eliminated for all except low-income, elderly tenants. Any landlord who had a disproportionate share of such tenants would receive a tax rebate. It said that rent control was designed to be temporary and in response to an "emergency" shortage of housing in 1969, but was not supposed to be a long-term solution.

The Boston Globe, which had previously supported rent control, editorialized after the report was released that "after 10 years, [rent control] is not working here" and that it should be repealed. The "point has come in this city," the editorial board said, "where rent control is counterproductive and should be abandoned." Tenant groups, on the other hand, asked for tighter rent controls and for the staff members who produced the report to be fired.

Two months later, White announced that he would not seek the end of rent control but propose adjustments to address the concerns of both landlords and tenants.

=== 1980s ===
In the mid-1980s, a new rent control and condo conversion ordinance was adopted and was set to expire on December 31, 1994. During hearings on whether or not to extend the law, it was estimated that allowing rent control to lapse would enable the city to collect an additional $14 million in tax revenue. The president of the Greater Boston Real Estate Board also noted that rents had fallen, on average, $50 per month over the previous two years at a time when costs such as water bills were rising dramatically.

It was ultimately voted, 12-1, to extend rent control until December 31, 2004. The vote took place in June 1993 even though the law was not set to expire until the last day of 1994. Six of the 13 members on the council had already announced their intentions not to run for reelection in 1994, and Mayor Flynn was preparing to become ambassador to the Vatican, prompting calls of foul play from housing providers.

A provision of Boston's rent control law stipulated that landlords could not increase rent without first giving the tenants the option to terminate the lease. Both the Massachusetts Supreme Judicial Court and the United States Supreme Court upheld the provision. Property taxes also had to be paid before a housing provider could request an increase in rent.

=== 1990s ===
By the 1990s, Boston's form of rent control had softened with almost 200 amendments over the previous 20 years. Rent increases were limited to 12%, and only in some buildings.

A new tax was instituted in 1992 on most people renting apartments in Boston to fund the Rent Control Board's operations. The Rent Control Board added a $1 a month fee that was to be collected by landlords and then submitted to the Rent Control Board. Eight months later, it was raised to $1.50.

== Rent control board ==
Local boards in communities with rent control approved or disapproved of increases in the rent to each unit under their jurisdiction. Rent control boards were "akin to a quasi court" and had executive, legislative, and judicial powers. They passed new laws, enforced new laws, and judged whether or not their laws had been violated. The boards were empowered to set maximum rents, promulgate regulations, hold hearings, adjudicate petitions, and employ staff. Housing providers bore the burden of proof during the evidentiary hearings.

Before evicting a tenant from a rent-controlled unit, a landlord first had to secure a certificate of eviction from the board by establishing one of the statute's narrowly defined just causes:

1. non‑payment of rent;
2. the tenant's material violation of lease obligations or creation of a nuisance;
3. owner‑occupancy or occupancy by an immediate family member of the owner;
4. board‑approved plans for substantial rehabilitation or demolition; or
5. the landlord's permanent withdrawal of the dwelling from the rental market.

Hearings were recorded and extensive documentation was required contributing to a judicial atmosphere and exacerbating tensions between tenants, housing providers, the rent control boards and their examiners.

Small property owners who moved out of state needed to return to Massachusetts every time they wished to raise rents or make other changes so that they could appear in person before the rent control boards.

Board decisions were subject to de novo review in the district court, and willful overcharges or unlawful evictions were punishable as criminal offenses.

=== Rent increases ===
When seeking an increase in rent, housing providers had to prove to the Rent Control Board that the increase was justified. (Note: In 1983, the board was renamed the Rent Equity Board.) They had to appear at a hearing and show bills or other documentation to convince the board that an increase was necessary. Before rent could be increased, tenants had to be notified and properties had to be inspected. Property owners could apply yearly for increases tied to the Consumer Price Index, up to 5%.

During the first five years of rent control, 90% of housing providers who owned nine or fewer units did not receive any rent increases. At the time, 61% of the city's housing stock was made up of buildings between two and nine units. The chief justice of the Boston Housing Court, Paul G. Garrity, opined that "the small landlord needs protection. He just does not have the ability to absorb the costs."

Petitions for an increase in rent to the Boston Rent Control Board took, on average, three months.

In the early 1980s, a new law was passed allowing tenants who lived in non-rent-controlled apartments to file a grievance if their housing provider increased the rent. The Board did not have the authority to mandate prior approval for increases for non-controlled units, but could require landlords to give their tenants a rent reduction.

The Boston Rent Control Board took a broad look at who was an owner of a property for the purposes of determining whether or not it fell under rent control. For example, if a parent co-signed a mortgage but did not live in the building while the child did, it was not considered to be owner-occupied and thus would fall under rent control regulations. Similarly, if a couple divorced or an inheritance led to one part-owner living in the building but another living elsewhere, the other units in the building would go from being non-rent-controlled to rent-controlled, and rents could be slashed.

=== Across-the-board rent increases ===
Originally, any housing provider who wanted to raise the rent on an apartment had to apply individually to the Rent Control Board. Jerome Lyle Rappaport, the president of the Rental Housing Association of the Greater Boston Real Estate Board, said the procedure to seek such an increase was so cumbersome that many property owners were discouraged from doing so. Tenant groups opposed across-the-board rent increases, saying that not every landlord needed or deserved an increase.

==== 1977 ====
City property taxes increased 28.6% in 1977 and property owners asked for a commensurate increase in rents. Instead, the Rent Control Board voted to increase rents by an average of 11%. The rent adjustment amounted to 50% of the increase in the property owner's tax bill. Tenants over 65 years old could apply for a 50% reduction in the increase, but few did.

The 4–1 vote was unpopular with both housing providers and with tenants. The Rental Housing Association testified that the decision would cost housing providers $15 million that year alone. They predicted many would not be able to pay their bills and that many smaller landlords would either abandon their properties or lose them to foreclosure. A tenants association said they would discuss a citywide rent strike in protest; they wanted an increase of no more than 4-5%.

The board also placed a moratorium on requests for individual rent increases from November 1976 to March 1977.

==== 1980 ====
In February 1980, Boston landlords asked the Rent Control Board for an across-the-board increase in rents. One property owner testified that since the last increase in 1977 his heating oil costs had gone up 207%, utilities were up 28%, insurance was up 105%, and sewer charges increased 286%. The Board denied the request, but did allow landlords to seek rent increases to account for increased heating fuel costs for the first time. The increase would only apply to 1980's costs, not to any future increases in the cost of heating oil or gas.

Tenants also would have the opportunity to challenge the increase. Tenant advocates said they were disappointed with the ruling and questioned "the policy of always passing on cost increases to the consumer." Tenant groups proposed that property owners who wanted to raise the rent should go before the Rent Control Board individually to request an increase. "I am horrified at the idea that landlords can raise rents without having to justify those rent increases," a tenant organizer said.

==== 1983 ====
The Rent Control Board rejected an across-the-board increase in 1983.

=== Repairs and upkeep ===
Landlords could not increase rent without permission, even for basic repairs and upkeep, and instead had to submit detailed requests and proposals to the Rent Control Board to "prove" that the work had been done with the cheapest possible materials. Housing providers would have to pay for repairs or to replace broken appliances and then submit receipts to the rent control boards, who were under no obligation to approve increases to recover the costs.

Landlords could petition for rent increases only when necessary to obtain a “fair net operating income,” a benchmark that directed boards to consider six specified factors: changes in property‑tax assessments, unavoidable increases in operating costs, capital improvements, alterations in services, physical deterioration, and the cost of normal repairs. In one instance, the Rent Control Board considered a loss of $8,500 in a single year to be "a fair net profit" for the property owners.

Because of delays in processing applications, inflation ate away at the amount landlords could ultimately collect in rent increases for capital improvements. Economist Herman B. Leonard of Harvard Business School found that landlords received between 70% and 75% of what the Rent Control Board deemed to be "fair." This, he said, was a "dramatic squeeze" on operating budgets, and led to less upkeep, lower quality, and faster deterioration of rent-controlled properties.

=== Evictions ===
Before a housing provider could go to court to evict a tenant, they first had to go through the Rent Control Board, prolonging the process. In 1980, the Rent Control Board adopted a new regulation requiring property owners to file copies of eviction notices with the board. The courts struck it down in June 1982.

=== Administrative ===
Though the first rent control law was adopted in 1969, funds to implement it were not available until 1970. The Rent Control Board met for the first time on March 16, 1970.

In 1977, the Rent Control Administration was threatened with eviction by their landlord, the Flatley Companies, after they fell four months in arrears on their rent.

When rent control was repealed, the Boston Rent Control Board had an annual budget of $1.2 million and a staff of 30 employees.

== Notable cases ==
=== Behan ===
The Behan family erected the first house on Magdala Street in Dorchester in 1896. The two-family home was still in the family in 1970 when they converted the attic into a small apartment. The three units were being rented out in 1993 while Bill Behan and his 86-year-old mother, Mary, lived next door in a home they had owned since 1955.

The rent control board ruled that the third apartment made the building subject to rent control with a maximum rent of $310 for all three units combined. That amount, Behan said, would not cover the water bill for the home.

The Rent Control Board ruled that the tenants had been overcharged for 23 years and ordered the Behans to pay back double what they had collected over the previous two decades. Because the family did not have the money to pay the $36,000 in fines, the house was auctioned off in November 1993.

=== Blakely ===
Ann Blakely and her husband purchased an apartment in 1985 with the intention of having their son live in it. The existing tenant, who earned a salary three times as much as the Blakely's son and owned a condominium in New Mexico along with other investments, would not move out, however. She was protected by rent control and so could not be evicted.

Blakely's husband died a year after they purchased the unit for $55,000. The tenant offered to buy it from them for $40,000.

Blakely's monthly mortgage and condo fees on the property were $535 and the tenant paid a rent of $374. The widow, who never earned more than minimum wage, made up the difference of $161 a month out of her Social Security check of $787 a month.

=== Conroy ===
In 1989, Ann Conroy purchased a triple decker in Dorchester. Because she planned to live in it herself, she thought she would be exempt from rent control and counted on market rate rents to be able to afford the mortgage payments.

Her father co-signed the 27 year old's mortgage however, and so the Rent Control Board considered him to be a part-owner. Since he did not live there, the Board ruled that the house was thus under rent control. With rents reduced from $500 to $181 a month, Conroy was forced to work overtime as a nurse's aide to make the mortgage payments.

=== Cox ===
Anne Cox and her sister purchased a two-family house in Jamaica Plain in 1978, with each sister taking one unit. At the age of 56, she went to night school to learn to become a handyman so she could make repairs on the house, including new windows, wallpaper, tiling, and paint, despite suffering from emphysema.

To help defray the costs of owning the home and making the repairs, both sisters took on roommates, but Anne's sister eventually moved out and sold her half to Anne. When a roommate stopped paying rent, Cox tried to evict her. The non-paying roommate then went to the Rent Control Board, who ruled that the Cox sisters' home was now a boarding house and cut the rents almost in half from $160 a month to $88.

When another tenant tried to extort her, filing a harassment complaint and then offering to drop it in exchange for a payment of $5,000, Cox decided not to rent to anyone anymore. In June 1993, however, the Rent Control Board ruled that she had to continue operating the house as a boarding house and had to rent out every room in her home. "The fact that you don't want to run a rooming house is not a good enough reason," the deputy administrator of the Rent Control Board told the now 72 year old.

Because it was now a boarding house in an area not zoned for it, Cox was ordered by the Rent Control Board to seek a zoning variance. She also had to make extensive renovations, including adding a handicapped entrance and fire protection. When she told the Rent Control Board she was not in a financial position to do so, they instructed her to take out loans and hire "outside management" to run her private home as a boarding house.

=== Flaherty ===
If a single housing provider owned adjoining properties, the Boston Rent Control Board considered all units on them to be part of the same property. Units in the building the owner lived in could then fall under rent control, despite the exemption for smaller, owner-occupied properties.

When Michael and Barbara Flaherty purchased their first home in their 70s, they chose a triple decker next door to a property owned by their daughter, Mary. Fifteen years later, Michael had moved to a nursing home and Barbara suffered from Alzheimer's disease. Mary tried to evict a tenant in her parents' building so that a caretaker could move in for Barbara, who needed 24-hour care.

The Rent Control Board ruled that, since Mary was acting in the place of her incapacitated parents, she had become the de facto owner of both buildings. As a result, both buildings would fall under rent control and the tenant could not be evicted. A Housing Court judge, "long considered a strong defender of tenants' rights," overturned the Board's decision. The judge called it "anti-family" and ruled that "adjacent buildings are not adjoining."

Mary claimed that city officials and tenant activists were pushing her to put her mother into a nursing home. She complained that she went into debt trying to care for her parents' health needs and that she had to pay a lawyer to deal with the Rent Control Board and the courts, but the tenant got free legal representation.

=== Morella ===
Residents of a Commonwealth Avenue apartment building opposed a rental increase in 1981 when the owner converted the apartments to condominiums. In the previous eight years, one tenant saw her rent increase by a total of $26 to $276. The owner, Gaetano Morella, paid more in taxes than he collected in rent. The tenants accused him of trying to raise the rents so they would be forced out, allowing him to sell empty units.

=== Pucci ===
Before Rose Pucci, a secretary, purchased a three-bedroom condo on Beacon Hill, she checked with the Rent Control Board to ensure that she would be able to evict the tenant and move in. They told her she could, as long as she planned to occupy the unit herself.

After she closed, she filed for eviction but the Rent Control Board sided with the tenant, a lawyer. They ruled that he should have been offered the first opportunity to buy the condo, even though it had been converted from an apartment to a condominium three years before he moved in. The tenant then stopped paying rent for various reasons. Pucci became homeless and went into debt.

Only after Pucci took the tenant to housing court did she receive a copy of the key to the condominium she owned. The tenant then filed a motion asking the court to force Pucci, who was representing herself because she could not afford an attorney, to pay his legal fees.

=== Santagate ===
When Charlotte Santagate bought a two-family house in East Boston in 1988, she converted it into a "sober house" for those recovering from substance abuse disorder. She and her family spent $250,000 to purchase and renovate the building. Santagate and her husband, trying to do a "good deed" for the community, also helped tenants find jobs. Governor Michael Dukakis presented them with a commendation for their efforts.

Tenants paid $80 a week for a clean room and signed agreements that said they would leave if they started using again. In 1992, a tenant complained to the Rent Control Board. When the Board ruled that the building should be under rent control, he stopped paying rent and encouraged his fellow tenants to do the same.

Santagate tried to evict the non-paying tenants, but the Rent Control Board refused to allow it because the building was not properly registered. Four months after the tenants stopped paying rent, Santagate was forced to abandon the building, sell her small business, and refinance her home to try and pay off her debts. The bank foreclosed and it was sold at auction for $125,000.

The house was once described as "a really, really nice place" after Santagate and her husband renovated it but, by April 1993, it was "filthy, cluttered with debris and known to neighbors as a haven for prostitutes and drug users."

== Condominium conversions ==
The adoption of rent control was a major reason there was "explosive growth" in the conversion of apartments to condominiums in the early 1970s. The Rental Housing Association of the Greater Boston Real Estate Board said in 1975 that condos "are such a logical outgrowth of rent control and runaway inflation that they must be reckoned with."

In 1969, the year before rent control was enacted, there were 183 condos in Boston and the surrounding areas. By 1975, there were 6,500. Landlords were unable to cover their costs, which were rising faster than the Rent Control Board was allowing them to raise rents, and so owners had an economic incentive to convert the apartments into condos and sell them off.

During the first 7 years of rent control, 5,000 rent-controlled apartments were converted in Boston, Brookline, and Cambridge. According to the Boston Globe, it was "because sizable profits can be made and because rent control... inhibits rental income and can give landlords other headaches as well." By 1983, the four communities that had rent control were those that saw the highest number of rental units converted into condominiums.

=== Bans and regulations ===
To prevent further conversions, Boston and other rent-controlled communities began requiring permission from the local rent control board to remove the unit from the rental housing market. The Boston City Council imposed a one-year ban on evictions of tenants if their apartments were converted into condos in December 1979. For low-income elderly tenants, it was a two-year ban.

In October 1984, the City Council passed a new ordinance regulating condo conversions. Low-income and handicap tenants could not be evicted from an apartment if it was converted into a condominium. Landlords had to give tenants up to ten years to move out after the conversion. The Supreme Judicial Court overturned the law, which was passed by the Boston City Council without a hearing, in July 1986.

Supporters said the permit systems preserved rental housing by preventing apartments from being converted one by one into owner-occupied condominiums. Opponents argued that the restrictions made it harder for moderate-income buyers to purchase converted apartments and limited owners' ability to sell their property. By 1988, few apartment buildings in communities with rent control were being converted to condominiums, which supporters described as evidence that the regulations were working.

Mayor Ray Flynn signed an ordinance in July 1987 banning evictions of any elderly, handicapped, or low- or moderate-income tenants of rent-controlled units when their apartments were converted to condos, regardless of the income of any other tenants in the unit. It also banned any lodging house unit from being converted to a condo without permission from the Rent Control Board.

== Effects on housing stock ==
Rent-controlled units in Boston
Date	Number of rent-controlled units	Notes
Early 1970s	110,000	
1975	120,000	
1976	122,000	(Note: Vacancy decontrol began on January 1, 1976. As apartments turned over, they could be removed from rent control.)
1977	74,000	(Note: There were 140,000 tenants in rent-controlled apartments.)
February 1980	8,000 buildings had rent-controlled units	
January 1981	45,000 units	
December 1981	35,000-40,000 units	
January 1988	80,000+ units	(Note: Roughly half of all units in the city were under some form of rent control.)
February 1989	90,000 units	
December 1990	95,000 units	
June 1993	20,000 units	
1994	22,000 units	(Note: There were an additional 63,000 units that were vacancy decontrolled.)

=== Decrease in rental units ===
By 1975, the Greater Boston Real Estate Board said the industry was "extremely sick" and blamed the problem on real estate taxes and rent control. The next year, they reported that rent control, condominium conversion laws, and other factors "virtually stopped construction in some markets." According to the National Bureau of Economic Research, the number of rental units was reduced by 15% and tenants were 8-9% less likely to move due to rent control.

Mayor Kevin White, who signed Boston's rent control ordinance into law in 1969, said in 1977 that he "put rent control on, but I also have the guts to take it off if it's killing housing, and I think that in some cases that's precisely what it was doing over a long period of time."

From the mid-1970s to the mid-1980s and beyond, there was little new housing built in Boston. At the same time, commercial and industrial development was "booming and jobs [were] increasing." The prospect of additional rent control, which Mayor Ray Flynn had proposed, discouraged residential construction.

During the 1980s, the number of available rental units shrank. In 1980, there were roughly 150,000 privately owned rental units in Boston but, by 1987, that number dropped to 122,350.

=== Lack of housing development ===
In response to the rent control ordinance being signed in 1969, $20 million ($177.3 million in 2026 dollars) in apartment construction was lost in the city of Boston in 1970 and 1971. Banks and insurance companies stopped lending to developers, causing deteriorating growth in the housing supply.

The Greater Boston Real Estate Board said that, six months into effect, the law stifled the creation of apartments for low- and moderate-income renters, as well as families. Only two buildings of apartments had been built in the city of Boston with conventional financing in 1974. The income buildings could produce under rent control, the Board said, was not enough to cover their expenses.

Only five of 31 Boston-area banks surveyed that year said they would finance the construction of new apartments if they would be subject to rent control. By 1975, other developers had stopped working in the city due to rent control.

By 1977, developers had stopped asking banks for loans and the only apartments being built were financed with federal- or state-insured mortgages, rent subsidies, or "tandem mortgages" where federal-oriented financial agencies bought mortgages. John Hancock Mutual Life Insurance Company reported that they were financing apartments in other parts of the country but, with rent control and taxes in Massachusetts, it did not make "economical sense to build conventionally."

Prior to rent control, financing the construction of apartments made up 67% of John Hancock's portfolio but, by 1976, it dropped to 7.3%. Instead, they turned to office buildings, shopping centers, hotels, and industrial properties "where rents are automatically escalated to keep up with operating costs."

At a meeting of the Massachusetts Mortgage Bankers in 1978, the speaker on conventional financing of multi-family residential homes said "there is none. Our firm has not provided one unit of financing in the past two years and has not been asked to." Developers said the fear that rents might be controlled in the future, even if they were exempt at the time, prevented them from building apartments.

=== Arson and abandoned buildings ===
A front-page article in the Boston Globe linked rent control to building disinvestment and abandonment in low-income neighborhoods. The report described a cycle in which landlords of rent-controlled buildings, faced with regulated rents that did not cover operating costs, deferred maintenance and stopped paying property taxes, leading to apartments becoming uninhabitable.

Tenant displacement and vacancy followed, with approximately 11,000 housing units being demolished in Boston's poorer neighborhoods as landlords could not rent them and did not have the funds to bring them up to code. The amount of back taxes owed was often more than the value of the building, leading the owners to abandon them on a weekly basis.

In 1983, as many as 25,000 housing units in Boston owed back taxes, and as many as 18,000 were abandoned as of 1984. Because the city did not want to take possession of them (which would have made them the largest property owner in the city) or to become a landlord, the buildings then sat empty.

After sitting vacant for some time, they were frequently either burned to the ground or demolished. According to the Boston Globe, the city's condo conversion and rent control laws incentivized landlords and banks to employ arson to deal with problem properties.

=== Urban blight ===
Tenants in rent-controlled units paid 40% below market rates on their units, and the value of properties was diminished by 45%. The difficulty of recovering costs discouraged the development of new buildings, and basic upkeep of existing buildings went undone. When properties that were under rent control fell into disrepair, they negatively impacted the property values of the buildings around them.

In a 1975 study of the effects of rent control in Massachusetts, George Sternlieb, the founder of the Rutgers University Center for Urban Policy Research, said that the loss of rental income would lead to a loss of "much of [the state's] housing investment." This was especially true communities like Boston and Cambridge, who had older housing stock and which would become a "wasted asset."

The Boston Rent Control Board slashed rents on one owner's properties by 2/3, bringing the total income on 8 units to $1,281. The property fell into disrepair with $150,000 worth of repairs needed. The bank that held the mortgage note tried to auction it off, but there were no bidders. Another building in the Back Bay had a mortgage of $250,000 but, when the bank which foreclosed upon it asked for $205,000, they could not sell it.

In 1985, Boston mayor Ray Flynn ordered a survey of all boarded-up buildings in Boston. By the time rent control ended in Boston, there were more than 10,000 vacant units in that city.

=== Boarding houses ===
Boarding houses were financially feasible before the era of rent control. In the 1970s, there were 9,500 rooms rented in Boston; the South End alone had 923 licensed rooming houses in 1964. By the mid-1980s, there were only 241 boarding houses in the city with 3,000 rooms. By 1989, the number had dropped to fewer than 100. The loss of boarding houses was cited as a reason for the rise of homelessness in Boston.

One such boarding house in the South End rented rooms for between $7 and $25, but Boston's rent control law resulted in the building running at a loss after a few years; the owner, an elderly woman, eventually sold the building and stayed on as a tenant.

In 1988, The First Church of Christ, Scientist paid the tenants of rooming houses it owned in the Back Bay to leave so that the buildings could be used to house church employees who were moving to the area. Some tenants received more than $10,000. The Rent Control Board refused to allow them to make the change and ordered the church to continue operating them as boarding houses.

== Financial effects of rent control ==
Economists have come to a "rare consensus" on the issue of rent control: it reduces the supply of rental housing, the existing housing stock deteriorates, and a community's property tax base is eroded. There are also secondary problems, including administrative costs, unemployment due to tenant immobility, increased energy consumption, and discrimination against tenants.

According to Commonwealth Magazine, the history of rent control in Massachusetts and around the nation "paints a consistent picture of market distortions and unintended, often inequitable, consequences." Robert Kuttner, the liberal columnist, said that rent control "creates a two-tier housing market where a controlled building contains outlandish bargains while an uncontrolled building across the street commands astronomical 'market' rents."

Through rent control, those who owned their own homes subsidized the rents of those who occupied rent-controlled apartments in the form of higher taxes.

=== Disparity between rents and operating costs ===
During the first three years of rent control, 1970 to 1973, the rents in rent-controlled apartments rose 6.7%. The cost to maintain and operate apartments during that period was more than double that. In 1973, fewer than 12% of tenants in rent-controlled apartments saw their rent go up. Costs for landlords rose 8% that year.

From 1970 to 1978, costs to maintain rental properties rose 84.5%; the Rent Control Board in Boston raised rents 67.5%. According to the Boston Globe, a disproportionate share of the costs of rent control is borne by the landlord. No other business is regulated in the same often arbitrary way."

The Boston Gas Company was owed more than $500,000 in unpaid bills by 137 housing developments in 1975 and told the Department of Public Utilities of their intention to turn off the heat and hot water on more than 13,000 units and 38,000 mostly low-income tenants. The developments, which were constructed in the 1960s, were "drastically behind in mortgage payments, paying utility bills and taking care of needed maintenance."

Property managers testified that the amount of income coming in was insufficient to meet their costs and, because of rent control, they were unable to raise the rents. Many properties were in default, and some had already been foreclosed upon. One of the developers wanted to give up the properties and had asked HUD to take over the buildings, but the federal agency refused.

=== HUD programs ===
When rent control was first instituted in Massachusetts, federally subsidized housing developments were placed under the purview of local rent control boards. In 1975, H.R. Crawford of the Department of Housing and Urban Development (HUD) issued new regulations exempting them from rent control, saying that the government needed to protect its $1 billion investment in housing stock.

Properties that were insured under a 1983 HUD program were able, in some circumstances, to bypass local rent control boards. By having HUD insure the properties, lenders loaned money to property developers at lower rates, leading to lower rents.

However, if a landlord could not make the payments because the rents allowed by rent control boards were too low, then HUD would make partial payments to the lenders to keep the properties from defaulting and going into foreclosure. HUD could preempt local rent control boards and allow for higher rents in order to protect taxpayers from having to pay on defaulted loans.

==== Foreclosure ====
Housing projects under rent control were unable to make their mortgage payments, putting them in danger of foreclosure. In Boston alone, there were 13,787 units that were protected by HUD's mortgage protection program. By 1975, more than half of them reverted to the government by 1977 because the owners defaulted and the banks collected their mortgage insurance.

According to Crawford, "local rent control is a significant factor in causing owners of Federal Housing Administration projects, especially subsidized projects, to default on their mortgage payments."

One owner with a HUD-backed mortgage was Boston Celtics player Satch Sanders. He bought a dilapidated building in Dorchester with rats and leaks "for the social thing," believing that Black residents should do more to help their own community. He eventually obtained 82 units throughout Dorchester and Roxbury but, "from a business standpoint, it was a disaster."

His utility bills were higher than the rents he brought in and, by the time the Rent Control Board approved one increase, he was in need of another. The bank foreclosed on him and HUD took over ownership.

=== Redistribution of state aid and tax burden ===
Because rent-controlled apartments fell into disrepair, and because properties that generate less income are less valuable, they were assessed lower. The total tax assessment in communities with rent control declined. Because municipalities lost tax revenue due to the lower assessments, state aid to communities with rent control increased, forcing communities without rent control to subsidize those who had it.

When a unit in Boston's Back Bay was converted from a rent-controlled apartment to a condo, its tax assessment nearly tripled. In Brookline, when a rent-controlled apartment was converted, tax revenue increased 28%.

For every dollar in rent that tenants saved, municipalities lost 30 cents in tax revenue. If a rent-controlled apartment was rented for $25 a month less than the market rate, the city lost $90 a year in revenue. Homeowners, in the form of higher property taxes, also subsidized the rents of those in rent-controlled apartments, according to economists.

Rents also rose on tenants in non-rent-controlled units. The tax burden also shifted to rental properties not under rent control. Landlords were then free to pass these costs on to their tenants.

=== Difficulty selling rent-controlled homes ===
In 1976, during an upturn for the real estate market generally, rent-controlled properties suffered. They were, according to one real estate professional, "proving to be highly difficult to sell at a reasonable figure because of a limitation on their income."

== Societal effects of rent control ==
=== Lack of means-testing ===
There was no requirement that rent-controlled apartments be rented to low-income tenants; at least 20 percent of all rent-controlled apartments housed the rich. The vast majority housed middle- and high-income earners, with the majority going to people with professional, technical, and managerial jobs.

A study by Rolf Goetze titled "Rent Control: Affordable Housing for the Privileged, Not The Poor" found in August 1994 that the median income per tenant in a rent-controlled apartment was $1,060 more than it was in a market rate apartment. Tenant advocacy organizations opposed means-testing.

According to MIT economist Jonathan Gruber, the reason that rent-controlled apartments tend to go to the rich is that they already have well-paying jobs. It is the poor who move from place to place in search of better opportunities, which means they lose out on the benefits of a rent-controlled apartment. "It really was a bad idea, and it continues to be a bad idea," Gruber said. "It's against basic economics."

=== Worsened climate change ===
Landlords were not allowed to charge tenants the actual cost of the heating and cooling bills, leading to increased usage and increased carbon emissions.

A study in the International Journal of Housing Policy found that rent control can make it harder to reduce carbon emissions from buildings as many energy-saving upgrades, such as better insulation, new windows, or more efficient heating systems, pose a significant upfront expense. Landlords are usually responsible for paying for these improvements, but tenants often receive much of the benefit through lower energy bills. When rent control limits a landlord's ability to raise rents and recover the cost of these upgrades, landlords may be less willing to invest in them. As a result, older buildings may use more energy and produce more greenhouse gas emissions.

Because tenants become "locked-in" and are less likely to move lest they lose their below market rents, they often have longer commutes when they take new jobs. This leads to more time in the car and more gasoline emissions.

== Statewide repeal ==
Rent control was repealed in 1994 via ballot initiative with an effective date of January 1, 1995. Massachusetts became the 27th state to ban rent control.

Only Cambridge, Brookline, and Boston maintained active rent control systems, each under separate enabling acts, while Amherst had a rent review system, and Lowell, Waltham, and Somerville had enabling legislation authorizing rent control but no program in effect. Only Cambridge had a full system in place even though "by virtually all commonly accepted measures... [Cambridge had] the very opposite of a housing emergency" at the time.

After rent control was repealed, average rents rose 21 percent across all units in municipalities that had a rent control program before repeal.

=== Election results ===
Election results
Jurisdiction	Yes	No
Statewide	1,034,594	980,723
Boston	56,539	64,663

At the November 8, 1994, state election, voters approved Question 9, abolishing rent control. The measure received 1,034,594 votes in favor and 980,723 votes against, or about 51 percent to 49 percent. Officials in Boston and Brookline blamed Cambridge for failing to modify its extreme version of rent control and upsetting voters enough to ban it statewide. Cambridge City Councilor Sheila Russell, who supported rent control, agreed. "If we had only listened to [the small property owners] and helped them out in the last five years, they would never have gone to this extreme," she said.

Although the initiative passed statewide, it lost in Boston and the other municipalities with rent control, but carried enough votes elsewhere in the state to prevail.

=== Attempts to undo the election ===
On the Thursday following the vote, the Boston City Council approved a home rule petition asking to reinstate rent control. Governor William Weld, who lived in Cambridge and voted in favor of the repeal, indicated he would veto them if they reached his desk. That same day, the Cambridge City Council met to discuss ways to bring rent control back. The mayors of Boston and Cambridge also met to discuss the possibilities.

Rent control supporters made an unsuccessful attempt to place a new measure on the 1996 state ballot. In August 1995, the Attorney General certified a proposed initiative titled the "Community Empowerment Act", which would have authorized municipalities to impose rent control among other local powers.

Supporters of Question 9 challenged the certification, arguing that the Massachusetts Constitution barred initiative petitions that were substantially the same as a measure submitted to voters in either of the two preceding biennial state elections. The challenge became moot when supporters of the Community Empowerment Act did not submit any signatures to the Secretary of the Commonwealth by the filing deadline.

== 21st century ==
Massachusetts has one of the lowest rates of new housing production anywhere in the country. In the years between 2012 and 2024, the rise in the median gross rent in Massachusetts rose nearly 30% faster than the median household income did across the Commonwealth. From 2000 to 2024, rent grew about 1% more per year than the consumer price index. In response, some have called for a return to rent control as a way to prevent tenants from being evicted and neighborhoods from becoming gentrified.

At the same time, the costs landlords have to maintain their properties grew even faster. In 2023 alone, property insurance rose 26%.

There is "a general consensus among economists" that instituting rent control would not solve the affordable housing crisis facing the state. The Brookings Institution wrote that "while rent control appears to help current tenants in the short run, in the long run it decreases affordability, fuels gentrification, and creates negative spillovers on the surrounding neighborhood."

=== Legislative efforts ===
Mayor Michelle Wu proposed re-instituting rent control in Boston via a home rule petition in 2023. Her proposal was criticized by both the real estate community, which opposes any form of rent control, and rent control advocates for not going far enough. The Boston Real Estate Board launched a campaign to oppose Wu's measure, saying it will discourage housing production in a city and a region that already has an acute shortage, will make maintaining properties more difficult, and will hurt tax revenues. The measure did not pass.

=== 2026 ballot measure ===
A ballot proposal to re-institute rent control was proposed for the 2026 Massachusetts ballot. (Note: In September 2025, Attorney General Andrea Campbell verified a ballot petition to implement rent control across the state, allowing supporters to collect nearly 75,000 signatures to put the measure on the ballot.) On June 23, 2026, the Supreme Judicial Court disallowed the question from appearing on the ballot. The Court said the exemption in the proposed law for religious institutions violated the Massachusetts Constitution because, "to enforce the proposed law, the exemption would require the government to determine if a facility is ‘operated solely for... religious... purposes,’ and then make an enforcement decision based on the facility’s religious purpose (or lack thereof)." Supporters called the ruling a "massive disappointment" and said "the issue raised by the court is easily fixable and doesn’t affect the substance of our proposal." They pledged to bring it back at a future election.

==== Market reactions ====
After the ballot question was certified, Governor Maura Healey announced that funding had been pulled for multiple housing projects representing thousands of new units, with funding flowing instead to projects in other states without rent control. In March 2026, National Real Estate Advisors, who had previously invested billions of dollars in Massachusetts over the prior 20 years, announced that they would stop investing in Massachusetts because of the prospect of rent control returning. The proposed ballot measure would exempt new construction for 10 years; developers of multifamily housing base their projects on timelines of between 20 and 40 years.

Other developers have announced they will stop building in Massachusetts if the measure were to pass. Banks also reported a "sharp drop" in the number of loans to build multifamily housing because of concerns about the ballot measure. Developers are telling the banks that "[w]e don’t have to invest in Massachusetts. We can invest in Connecticut or New York."

According to Cabot, Cabot & Forbes, "the prospect of rent control has effectively suspended investor appetite for new investments in Massachusetts." The company's CEO, Jay Doherty, said that investors, which include pension funds, endowments, and bundles of private investors, "will not even look at [a CC&F] project" because the returns would be too low with rent control. "Rent control is just another piece of iron rebar on the camel’s back," according to Doherty.

==== Effects on local budgets ====
A report from the Greater Boston Real Estate Board and the Center for State Policy Analysis at Tufts University found that adoption of the law would trigger a "fiscal tsunami" by wiping out $300 billion from home and property values. This, in turn, would cause a "cascade of effects" by reducing how much municipalities were able to take in property taxes, leading to cuts to services in urban areas and rural areas alike. Because the value of apartments would decrease, and because landlords would have less money to invest in them, buildings would begin to deteriorate. This would reduce the value of the homes around it, and decrease the tax base as a result.

According to Worcester mayor Joseph Petty, removing this much of the tax base would be "catastrophic to local municipal budgets." "Rent control would devalue properties with crushing effects on our budgets that support teachers and education, police, fire, and public safety, and infrastructure maintenance and improvement in our cities and towns," according to Methuen Mayor D.J. Beauregard.

A study by the Fiscal Alliance Foundation found that homeowners would see a 6% increase in the tax rate as more value was placed on owner-occupied properties and values fell on rental units. In Boston, tax rates on the average home would rise by $1,117. Paul Craney, the executive director of the Fiscal Alliance Foundation, calls the proposal "a tax increase on homeowners."

Wealthy renters would benefit more from rent control than poorer renters would in pure dollar amount terms because the base rent is already higher. The economic benefit of rent control would flow from landlords to those who are already renting apartments, and not to those most in need.

==== Support and opposition ====
Boston mayor Michelle Wu considered the measure imperfect, but planned to vote for it, citing the need to make housing more affordable. Governor Maura Healey opposed the ballot measure, saying that if “you look at the studies, you effectively halt production” with rent control. Others who supported rent control in general opposed this particular measure, saying that "as proposed, this ballot question is a terrible idea."

A group of 12 mayors, including those from some of the Commonwealth's densest cities and those with the highest population of renters, opposed the measure. They cited its likely effect of slowing down housing production, the negative impacts it would have on municipal budgets, and how it would ultimately hurt, not help, the effort to bring down housing prices. The cons, they said, outweighed the pros, making it counterproductive. Worcester mayor Joseph Petty opposed the measure, saying it would have "disastrous consequences."

== Works cited ==
- Bloom, Robert M. (1 January 1974). "Chapter 19: Rent Control". Annual Survey of Massachusetts Law. 1974 (1).
- Moncreiff, Robert P. (23 September 1996). "The Repeal of Rent Control in Cambridge". New England Journal of Public Policy. 12 (1).
