= Rent control in Brookline, Massachusetts =

History of rent control and rent-control proposals in Brookline, Massachusetts

Rent control in Brookline, Massachusetts limited rents and restricted evictions in many of the town's rental homes from 1970 until statewide repeal took effect in 1995. Brookline first adopted a local rent-control measure in 1969, but the Massachusetts Supreme Judicial Court struck it down for lack of state authorization. After the state granted that authority, Brookline Town Meeting adopted a new bylaw in September 1970 covering approximately 12,000 rental units.

Brookline's Rent Control Board regulated rent increases and reviewed requests to evict tenants or remove apartments from the rental market. As owners converted apartments to condominiums, the town adopted further restrictions on conversions and related evictions. The rules, their effect on rental housing and property taxes, and the presence of higher-income tenants in rent-controlled apartments became subjects of prolonged political dispute.

Following a shift in town politics, Brookline voted in 1990 to phase out rent control for some apartments while retaining protections for certain tenants. Massachusetts voters approved a statewide repeal in 1994, although a majority of Brookline voters opposed it. The repeal took effect on January 1, 1995, with temporary protections subsequently provided for some low-income tenants.

== Adoption of rent control ==
=== Initial attempt ===
Rent-controlled units in Brookline
| Date | Number of rent-controlled units | Notes |
|---|---|---|
| 1970 | 12,000 | |
| 1975 | 11,400 | |
| 1984 | 8,000 | (Note: About 57% of all rental units were rent-controlled.) |
| 1988 | 8,000 | |
| 1990 | 4,000-7,000 | |
| 1991 | 7,200 | |
| 1994 | 4,000-4,500 | |

After a vote to impose rent control in Brookline failed to pass Town Meeting in September 1968, a poll taken leading up to the following election showed that most of the new candidates were drawn to the race so they could vote to limit rents. Votes at Town Meeting failed again in late 1968 and early 1969.

In June 1969, a proposal was adopted to give the Rent Review and Grievance Board the power to cut rents or break leases if tenants complained. There was no appeals process. Landlords were required to report to the Town how much they were collecting in rent, how many rooms each unit had, and how many people were living there. It was the first municipality in the nation, aside for New York City, to impose rent control in the post-war era. Kitty Dukakis was instrumental in the effort to get the law passed.

In June 1970, the Supreme Judicial Court struck down the law, saying the Town did not have the authority to implement rent control without a grant of authorization from the Great and General Court. In the time it had been operating, 62 landlords were ordered to slash their rents and six of them had taken the Town to court.

=== State law ===
On August 30, 1970, Governor Francis W. Sargent signed into law a bill that authorized rent control in municipalities with more than 50,000 residents, potentially affecting more than 40 communities. (Note: Chapter 842 of the Acts of 1970.) The law had an expiration date of April 1974 and then was extended to December 31, 1975, and again to March 31, 1976. After April 1, 1976, special acts were passed for the municipalities who wanted rent control, but there was no state-wide authorization.

Municipalities that opted in were required to establish and administer local rent‑control programs consistent with the statute's standards. The statute froze maximum rents at the amounts charged six months before local adoption, creating an immediate rollback for units whose rents had risen during that period.

The Act applied broadly to existing rental housing but expressly exempted transient accommodations, dwellings built or converted after January 1, 1969, units already regulated under another governmental program, owner‑occupied two‑ and three‑family houses, cooperative or educational housing, and locally defined “luxury” apartments, provided no more than twenty‑five per cent of the locality's rental stock was excluded.

=== Local adoption ===
On the same day the new statewide rent control act was signed into law, a home rule petition was enacted granting Brookline the power to impose rent control separately. The next day, the Brookline Selectmen called for a special town meeting to adopt a new by-law that would be even stricter than the one approved by the state.

Following four hours of debate on September 29, 1970, front of a crowd of 1,200, the Town Meeting passed, on a roll call vote of 139–93, a new rent control law. It rolled rents back to their March 1 levels. The law covered 12,000 rental units, including 2,200 in two- and three-family houses. In 1976, Town Meeting adopted a new by-law to take effect in place of the statewide law, which was set to expire in a few weeks.

By 1988, the Boston Globe reported that the rent control by-law had "been altered and patched so many times it has become incomprehensible even to those who administer it." In 1993, the law was 178 pages long.

== Rent Control Board and Administration ==
=== State law ===
Local boards in communities with rent control approved or disapproved of increases in the rent to each unit under their jurisdiction. Rent control boards were "akin to a quasi court" and had executive, legislative, and judicial powers. They passed new laws, enforced new laws, and judged whether or not their laws had been violated. The boards were empowered to set maximum rents, promulgate regulations, hold hearings, adjudicate petitions, and employ staff. Housing providers bore the burden of proof during the evidentiary hearings.

Before evicting a tenant from a rent-controlled unit, a landlord first had to secure a certificate of eviction from the board by establishing one of the statute's narrowly defined just causes:

1. non‑payment of rent;
2. the tenant's material violation of lease obligations or creation of a nuisance;
3. owner‑occupancy or occupancy by an immediate family member of the owner;
4. board‑approved plans for substantial rehabilitation or demolition; or
5. the landlord's permanent withdrawal of the dwelling from the rental market.

Hearings were recorded and extensive documentation was required contributing to a judicial atmosphere and exacerbating tensions between tenants, housing providers, the rent control boards and their examiners.

Small property owners who moved out of state needed to return to Massachusetts every time they wished to raise rents or make other changes so that they could appear in person before the rent control boards.

Board decisions were subject to de novo review in the district court, and willful overcharges or unlawful evictions were punishable as criminal offenses.

=== Brookline's Rent Control Board ===
The Rent Control Board was composed of three public interest representatives, two landlord representatives, and two tenant representatives. In December 1984, the Selectmen rejected a white candidate for the Rent Control Board and told the director to find a minority candidate instead. Infighting on the 7-member board had become so bad in 1993 that a selectman called on the entire board to step down.

Housing providers collected a $14 a month tax from tenants that they then submitted to the Town to fund the Rent Control Board. In 1993, Joel Berkovitz succeeded Yvette Begue as director the Rent Control Board; he earned a salary of $51,704.

The Brookline Tenant Union opposed a proposal before the Rent Control Board that would require tenants to provide their housing providers with a copy of the key to the property they owned.

When rent control was repealed, the Brookline Rent Control Board had an annual budget of $351,000 and a staff of nine full-time and one part-time employees.

== Rent increases ==
Rent control was used to keep rents below market value. There was no means-testing and wealthy tenants lived in rent-controlled homes.

The Rent Control Board took more than three months in 1975 to hear petitions for rent increases because they conducted an audit "as exhaustive as the Internal Revenue Service's" on housing providers records to determine what they believed a justifiable rent increase would be; by 1988, it took a year before a hearing was held. The Brookline Tenants Union opposed all across-the-board rent increases, saying that instead each individual housing provider should have to come in and petition the board for an increase.

Housing providers, citing operating costs that rose 24.5% in 1979, asked for a rent increase of 14.7% in 1980. Tenants argued that rents should not be raised at all. The Rent Control Board approved an increase of between 4.4% and 10.1%. This included a 3.6% increase previously granted. The president of the Brookline Property Owners Association accused the Rent Control Board of historically ignoring the impact of inflation when determining rent increases and cited the portion of the rent control law which allowed landlords "a fair net operating income."

From 1972 to 1988, the cost of living rose 187%; the Rent Control Board approved increases in rents of 69%. In more than three years leading up to the 1988 town elections, the Rent Control Board had raised rents by 2.77%. Inflation between 1985 and 1988 was 9.67%.

The Rent Control Board allowed a housing provider to raise rents in order to pay off a $100,000 improvement to his property in 1993. A tenant called it "embezzlement" and said "I feel like I am being stolen from." Part of the money would come from a loan that was forgivable after 10 years if he rented to low- and moderate income tenants. The tenants sued to block the rent increase.

=== Repairs and upkeep ===
Landlords could not increase rent without permission, even for basic repairs and upkeep, and instead had to submit detailed requests and proposals to the Rent Control Board to "prove" that the work had been done with the cheapest possible materials. Housing providers would have to pay for repairs or to replace broken appliances and then submit receipts to the rent control boards, who were under no obligation to approve increases to recover the costs. Tenants were able to withhold rent in response to alleged faults with their units without providing any evidence.

It could take between six months and two years of adversarial hearings before the Rent Control Board for a decision to be made. If an increase in rent was approved, it could take six weeks to six months before the increase was passed on to the tenant, and it would be temporary. Rents went back down after the cost of the capital improvements were recovered by the landlord. Tenant advocates said that granting any rent increases for repairs, even temporary ones, undermined the idea of rent control itself. Dozens of tenants "stormed a City Council meeting" in Cambridge in 1992, protesting the fact that the rent control board allowed housing providers to increase rents to pay for repairs and upgrades.

When one housing provider spent over $200,000 in capital improvements on his property, the Cambridge Rent Control Board refused to allow him to raise rents to cover the expenses. Not all of the repairs were required, the Board said, because new electrical and water service were not mandated by building or safety codes. The owner sued, and a Superior Court justice ruled that the Board was imposing criteria not found in the regulations; she ruled in favor of the housing provider.

Because of delays in processing applications, inflation ate away at the amount landlords could ultimately collect in rent increases for capital improvements. Economist Herman B. Leonard of Harvard Business School found that landlords received between 70% and 75% of what the Rent Control Board deemed to be "fair." This, he said, was a "dramatic squeeze" on operating budgets, and led to less upkeep, lower quality, and faster deterioration of rent-controlled properties.

=== Fair net operating income ===
Landlords could petition for rent increases only when necessary to obtain a “fair net operating income,” a benchmark that directed boards to consider six specified factors: changes in property‑tax assessments, unavoidable increases in operating costs, capital improvements, alterations in services, physical deterioration, and the cost of normal repairs.

Mortgage expenses were not allowed to be considered when calculating an approved rent. Legal and management fees were also not allowed to be passed on to tenants, and neither was lost rent due to non-payment.

=== 1979 Oil Crisis ===
During the 1979 oil crisis, property owners asked for an across-the-board increase of 5.3% to account for rising fuel costs so they could afford to provide heat to tenants. The Rent Control Board proposed a 2.5% increase.This upset both housing providers and tenants. One housing provider restified that "it's absolutely impossible for an owner of a rent-controlled property to even break even in Brookline." The president of the Brookline Tenants Union called a 2.5% increase "unconscionable."

=== 1984 rent increase ===
From its institution in 1971, the Brookline Rent Control Board only considered changes in maintenance costs and overall operating expenses when considering how much rents could be increased. In September 1984, the board changed the policy, saying they did not believe it was fair to landlords.

At that meeting, Brookline landlords asked the Rent Control Board for a rent increase of more than 30%, while tenants countered with a proposal to raise rents 2.4%. The Rent Control Board then voted for a 16.3% increase, with some members saying they were trying to make up the difference for lost increases in the past under the policy they considered to be unfair. Tenants sued in Suffolk Superior Court to stop the increase. (Note: The Board moved to have the case transferred to Norfolk Superior Court as Brookline was in Norfolk County, not Suffolk; tenants filed in Suffolk because one of the landlords also owned rental units in Suffolk County. The judge declined to transfer the case.)

Tenants also submitted an article to the January 1985 Town Meeting to rescind the 16.3% increase and establish changes to maintenance costs and operating expenses as the only justification for an increase in rent. A selectman opposed the change, saying it did not take into account increases in property taxes and that rent-controlled property would "live in a world free of inflation."

The measure passed after a two-hour debate, 132–76, while the court case was still pending. In May 1985, Attorney General Francis X. Bellotti overturned the vote, saying the enabling legislation granting Brookline the power to institute rent control gave the Rent Control Board, not Town Meeting, the authority to decide what methods they would use.

Days later, at the annual town election, an incumbent selectman was defeated and two new rent control supporters were elected to the board, giving them a 3-2 pro-tenant majority. The election, which saw a record turnout, largely revolved around the issue which had been the major policy issue in the town for many years.

== Condo law ==
=== Background ===
After rent control was implemented in Brookline, many property owners began converting their apartments into condos. From 1970 to 1976, 550 were converted and, from January 1977 to June 1978, another 550 were converted. (Note: During the first 7 years of rent control, 5,000 rent-controlled apartments were converted in Boston, Brookline, and Cambridge.) According to the Boston Globe, it was "because sizable profits can be made and because rent control... inhibits rental income and can give landlords other headaches as well."

The Rental Housing Association of the Greater Boston Real Estate Board said in 1975 that condos "are such a logical outgrowth of rent control and runaway inflation that they must be reckoned with." By 1983, the four communities that had rent control were those that saw the highest number of rental units converted into condominiums. Property owners said that condos were "a way out of the rent control housing business and a way for them to "recoup some of their losses."

To prevent further conversions, communities with rent control began requiring permission from the local rent control board to remove the unit from the rental housing market. By 1978, 10% of apartments in Brookline had been converted. As a result, that year Brookline adopted a by-law declaring that an apartment could not be converted into a condominium without the consent of the Rent Control Board.

Supporters said the permit systems preserved rental housing by preventing apartments from being converted one by one into owner-occupied condominiums. Opponents argued that the restrictions made it harder for moderate-income buyers to purchase converted apartments and limited owners' ability to sell their property. By 1988, few apartment buildings in communities with rent control were being converted to condominiums, which supporters described as evidence that the regulations were working.

=== Eviction bans ===
Per the terms of the 1978 by-law, when a condo was being sold, the seller could not request an eviction permit from the rent control board; only the buyer of the property could request one. Once the permit was in hand, only then could the buyer go to court to seek an actual eviction. After that, tenants had to be given a minimum of six months notice, with an additional six months granted in hardship cases. This often held up the closing of property sales.

The following year, Brookline became the first community in the country to ban evictions related to condo conversions. The ban was known as the Businger Ban after John Businger, the chief sponsor. It passed at the May 1979 Town Meeting after similar proposals had failed at two previous town meetings. If a tenant lived in a condo before it was converted, he could not be evicted even if the owner wanted to live in it himself; the tenant could live there indefinitely.

=== Owners could not live in their own condos ===
Under Brookline's "complex" rent control law, condo owners were not allowed to live in their properties if they had previously been rentals and were subject to fines of $1,000 a day of they did, even if the apartment was vacant. By 1986, it could take up to six months for the board to issue a permit for condo owners to remove a unit from rent control so they could live in it themselves.

In 1988, Town Meeting granted amnesty to the estimated 400 to 900 owners who were illegally living in their own condos. At the same meeting, Town Meeting banned the conversion of any rent-controlled units to condominiums. Two years later, in 1990, the Rent Control Board sent thousands of letters to owner-occupants of condos that demanded they either pay a $120 rent control registration fee or prove their unit was not subject to rent control.

=== Complex regulations ===
The Boston Globe described the condominium-permit systems in Brookline and Cambridge as a "confusing maze of regulations," with overlapping exemptions, changing timetables, and lawsuits. Officials in Brookline and Cambridge called the rules simple in theory, but also acknowledged that the process had become difficult to explain.

For example, the rules governing evicting tenants and allowing tenants could buy their units changed repeatedly. At first, owners could sell only to tenants who had occupied a unit for at least one year; later, that rule was abolished, and by 1988 only certain tenants who had lived in their units before September 1, 1985, could buy them under specific conditions.

The Boston Globe described the condominium-permit systems in Brookline and Cambridge as a "confusing maze of regulations," with overlapping exemptions, changing timetables, and lawsuits. Officials in Brookline and Cambridge called the rules simple in theory, but also acknowledged that the process had become difficult to explain.

== Tax burden shifted to homeowners ==
The Town's rent control policy caused the shift of the tax burden from rent-controlled apartments to homeowners. In January 1985, after property assessments on homeowners rose as much as 78% from the previous valuation three years prior, 100 taxpayers crowded into a Selectmen's meeting to complain. (Note: Sales prices of single family homes in the region rose 19% over the same period.)

The Boston Globe, in a front-page story, used Governor Michael Dukakis as an example. During the first 18 years of rent control, the value of his house rose 1,468%. Rent control supporters admitted at the time that, because rental properties were assessed on how much income they produced while family homes were assessed on their market value, that real estate taxes on homeowners increased and served as a subsidy for renters who were often wealthy.

The town's rent control policy fueled hostility and antagonism in the community. In the 1989 town elections, candidates' lawn signs were torn down, set afire, and otherwise vandalized. The divisions over rent control destroyed friendships, pit neighbor against neighbor, and was said to lead to the most divisive period of Brookline's history in memory.

=== 1987 reevaluation ===
In 1987, properties were reassessed and valuations on non-rent-controlled properties increased by more than 100%. The Town's chief assessor said it would mean "dramatically higher taxes for owners of these properties."

Some homeowners, who paid more than 80% of the taxes in Brookline, saw their tax bills triple while owners of rent-controlled apartments received refunds. Buildings with rent-controlled apartments were assessed, and thus taxed, at lower rates than other propoerties. This jump in taxes, and the realization that this was the price of subsiding rent control "changed the political context of the town. Before then, the impact of the cost of social programs was not directly apparent to residential homeowners."

It was estimated in 1987 that, by 1993, the town would face a budget deficit of $13 million. Two years later, in 1989, Brookline homeowners paid the highest taxes in Massachusetts.

== Brookline's wealthy tenants ==
A Brookline selectman who supported rent control admitted that it was "producing bargain-basement specials to people who don't need them. They're paying rent with subsidy by homeowners." John Silber said he knew a Brookline doctor who had a rent-controlled apartment just for his dog.

Passions ran high, including arson and property destruction, in Brookline when it was learned homeowners's taxes would more than double while the "well-to-do" were living in rent-controlled apartments. Wealthy tenants living in rent-controlled apartments was a major issue in the 1990 town election. "When units become vacant, they don't go to the poor, they go to the lucky," according to a Brookline selectman.

The Brookline Tenants Union opposed means-testing for rent-controlled units. By 1992, there were 300 Brookline residents on the wait list for public housing.

== Notable cases ==
=== Bradford Terrace ===
To encourage capital improvements on rent-controlled buildings, the Rent Control Board devised a short-form petition for housing providers to request a rent increase without having to divulge their operating costs. The long-form petition asked for more information so that the Rent Control Board could decide what they thought a "fair" net operating income was for the housing provider to earn.

When the Rent Control Board approved a rent increase based on a tax increase for a building on Bradford Terrace using a short-form petition, the tenants sued to stop the increase. The tenants wanted the property owner to open up his books for their inspection so they could determine if they thought a rent increase was justified. The judge ruled in their favor.

The chairman of the Rent Control Board said allowing the ruling to stand would be "a nightmare" as tenants would ask for cases to be reopened. This, he said, would be an expensive burden on the Rent Control Board. The Rent Control Board was funded through tenant fees and the chairman said he did not think taxpayers would want to spend an additional $400,000 on the Rent Control Board when it could go to schools or other municipal services.

=== Chan ===
In 1979, Man Hoo and Paula Chan, a newlywed couple, purchased a condo in Brookline. The couple intended to make it their home, but Brookline's Rent Control Board refused to let them evict the tenant who was currently living there.

The tenant paid $200 a month in rent; the Chan's mortgage payment and condo fee were a combined $400. The couple petitioned the Brookline Rent Control Board in April 1979 to raise the rent from $200 to $490 but, as of January 1980, they had not yet received a hearing on the request.

=== Hancock Village ===
In 1985, Edward E. Zucker purchased Hancock Village, which straddled the Brookline-Boston line. By 1991, he had invested $25 million into the complex to remove asbestos and lead paint, install a new electrical system, roof and window replacements, and make other improvements. "The work I had to do was the result of neglect from 20 years of rent control, where the owner before me had no incentive to do the work," Zucker said. "As a responsible owner I can't close my eyes to things around the place that need to be upgraded."

When the Rent Control Board approved rent increases to pay for all of the improvements, a group of tenants took Zucker and the Rent Control Board to court to try and overrule the rent increases, some of which doubled over a two-year period. Tenant activists said that voting to allow the property owner to recoup the costs of the improvements was a sign that the Rent Control Board had become too pro-landlord.

The Board's decision was overturned by the courts but was appealed by the owner of Hancock Village. The judge ruled that the rent increase was not reasonable because the owner did not seek out two independent bids for all improvements, which the Rent Control Board required. Zucker and the Rent Control Board argued that it was not necessary, because he began making the improvements before that requirement took effect.

=== Russoniello ===
When Mark and Alice Russoniello purchased a condo that had previously been a rental apartment at full market value, they were not told it lacked a removal permit. As a result, they were illegally living in the condo they owned and were subject to fines of $1,000 a day. Though they paid full market value, they could not sell themselves for that amount because, with rent control, the unit was not worth as much.

== Effects on housing stocks ==
=== Urban blight ===
Tenants in rent-controlled units paid 40% below market rates on their units, and the value of properties was diminished by 45%. The difficulty of recovering costs discouraged the development of new buildings, and basic upkeep of existing buildings went undone. When properties that were under rent control fell into disrepair, they negatively impacted the property values of the buildings around them.

In a 1975 study of the effects of rent control in Massachusetts, George Sternlieb, the founder of the Rutgers University Center for Urban Policy Research, said that the loss of rental income would lead to a loss of "much of [the state's] housing investment."

=== Decrease in rental units ===
By 1975, the Greater Boston Real Estate Board said the industry was "extremely sick" and blamed the problem on real estate taxes and rent control. The next year, they reported that rent control, condominium conversion laws, and other factors "virtually stopped construction in some markets." According to the National Bureau of Economic Research, the number of rental units was reduced by 15% and tenants were 8-9% less likely to move due to rent control.

Only five of 31 Boston-area banks surveyed in 1974 said they would finance the construction of new apartments if they would be subject to rent control. By 1977, developers had stopped asking banks for loans and the only apartments being built were financed with federal- or state-insured mortgages, rent subsidies, or "tandem mortgages" where federal-oriented financial agencies bought mortgages. John Hancock Mutual Life Insurance Company reported that they were financing apartments in other parts of the country but, with rent control and taxes in Massachusetts, it did not make "economical sense to build conventionally."

Prior to rent control, financing the construction of apartments made up 67% of John Hancock's portfolio but, by 1976, it dropped to 7.3% Instead, they turned to office buildings, shopping centers, hotels, and industrial properties "where rents are automatically escalated to keep up with operating costs."

At a meeting of the Massachusetts Mortgage Bankers in 1978, the speaker on conventional financing of multi-family residential homes said "there is none. Our firm has not provided one unit of financing in the past two years and has not been asked to." Developers said the fear that rents might be controlled in the future, even if they were exempt at the time, prevented them from building apartments.

== Financial effects of rent control ==
Economists have come to a "rare consensus" on the issue of rent control: it reduces the supply of rental housing, the existing housing stock deteriorates, and a community's property tax base is eroded. There are also secondary problems, including administrative costs, unemployment due to tenant inmobility, increased energy consumption, and discrimination against tenants.

According to Commonwealth Magazine, the history of rent control in Massachusetts and around the nation "paints a consistent picture of market distortions and unintended, often inequitable, consequences." Robert Kuttner, the liberal columnist, said that rent control "creates a two-tier housing market where a controlled building contains outlandish bargains while an uncontrolled building across the street commands astronomical 'market' rents."

According to the Boston Globe, a disproportionate share of the costs of rent control is borne by the landlord. No other business is regulated in the same often arbitrary way."

=== HUD programs ===
When rent control was first instituted in Massachusetts, federally subsidized housing developments were placed under the purview of local rent control boards. In 1975, H.R. Crawford of the Department of Housing and Urban Development (HUD) issued new regulations exempting them from rent control, saying that the government needed to protect its $1 billion investment in housing stock.

Properties that were insured under a 1983 HUD program were able, in some circumstances, to bypass local rent control boards. By having HUD insure the properties, lenders loaned money to property developers at lower rates, leading to lower rents.

However, if a landlord could not make the payments because the rents allowed by rent control boards was too low, then HUD would make partial payments to the lenders to keep the properties from defaulting and going into foreclosure. HUD could preempt local rent control boards and allow for higher rents in order to protect taxpayers from having to pay on defaulted loans.

=== Redistribution of state aid and tax burden ===
Because rent-controlled apartments fell into disrepair, and because properties that generate less income are less valuable, they were assessed lower. The total tax assessment in communities with rent control declined. Because municipalities lost tax revenue due to the lower assessments, state aid to communities with rent control increased, forcing communities without rent control to subsidize those who had it. In Brookline, when a rent-controlled apartment was converted, tax revenue increased 28%.

For every dollar in rent that tenants saved, municipalities lost 30 cents in tax revenue. If a rent-controlled apartment was rented for $25 a month less than the market rate, the town lost $90 a year in revenue. Homeowners, in the form of higher property taxes, also subsidized the rents of those in rent-controlled apartments, according to economists.

Through rent control, those who owned their own homes subsidized the rents of those who occupied rent-controlled apartments in the form of higher taxes. Rents also rose on tenants in non-rent-controlled units. The tax burden also shifted to rental properties not under rent control. Landlords were then free to pass these costs on to their tenants.

=== Difficulty selling rent-controlled homes ===
In 1976, during an upturn for the real estate market generally, rent-controlled properties suffered. They were, according to one real estate professional, "proving to be highly difficult to sell at a reasonable figure because of a limitation on their income."

== Societal effects of rent control ==
=== Lack of means-testing ===
There was no requirement that rent-controlled apartments be rented to low-income tenants; at least 20 percent of all rent-controlled apartments housed the rich. The vast majority housed middle- and high-income earners, with the majority going to people with professional, technical, and managerial jobs. Many tenants were wealthier than their landlords.

A study by Rolf Goetze titled "Rent Control: Affordable Housing for the Privileged, Not The Poor" found in August 1994 that the median income per tenant in a rent-controlled apartment was $1,060 more than it was in a market rate apartment. Tenant advocacy organizations opposed means-testing.

According to MIT economist Jonathan Gruber, the reason that rent-controlled apartments tend to go to the rich is that they already have well-paying jobs. It is the poor who move from place to place in search of better opportunities, which means they lose out on the benefits of a rent-controlled apartment. "It really was a bad idea, and it continues to be a bad idea," Gruber said. "It's against basic economics."

=== Worsened climate change ===
Landlords were not allowed to charge tenants the actual cost of the heating and cooling bills, leading to overuse and excess emissions. A study in the International Journal of Housing Policy found that rent control can make it harder to reduce carbon emissions from buildings as many energy-saving upgrades, such as better insulation, new windows, or more efficient heating systems, pose a significant upfront expense. Landlords are usually responsible for paying for these improvements, but tenants often receive much of the benefit through lower energy bills. When rent control limits a landlord's ability to raise rents and recover the cost of these upgrades, landlords may be less willing to invest in them. As a result, older buildings may use more energy and produce more greenhouse gas emissions.

Because tenants become "lockled-in" and are less likely to move lest they lose their below market rents, they often have longer commutes when they take new jobs. This leads to more time in the car and more gasoline emissions.

== Political organizations ==
Several homeowners began meeting and organizing after the 1987 reevaluation in an effort to gain political power to change the laws. This led to a "homeowner revolution" in the 1990 election.

By 1992, there were at least four homeowner groups, two tenant groups, three taxpayer groups, 22 neighborhood associations, and a variety of splinter groups and alliances. This led to "tribal warfare" and "Brookline's version of the Civil War." These included

- Association of One-, Two-, and Three-Family Homeowners
- Brookline Civic Association, which opposed rent control
- Brookline Homeowners Association
- Brookline Neighborhood Coalition
- Brookline PAX, a pro-rent control group that originated as an anti-Vietnam War organization
- Brookline Taxpayers Association
- Brookline Tenants Union, a pro-rent control group had between 350 and 400 members who paid $15 in annual dues
- Committee Against Unfair Taxation
- Condominium Association of Brookline
- Independent Town Meeting Members of Precinct 9 (ITMMOP9)

== Secession movement ==
In 1987, a group of South Brookline residents petitioned to have Precinct 15 removed from Brookline and annexed to Newton. "The homeowner, the major source of property tax revenue is functionally disenfranchised in Brookline; politics is completely dominated by the tenants and the rent control interest," one organizer said of the reason they wanted to move.

== Phase out of rent control ==
=== 1990 election ===
In 1990, two rent control opponents beat three rent control supporters for seats on the Board of Selectmen, switching the balance of power from 3–2 in favor of rent control to 4-1 opposed. One of the winners said that "this has been coming for at least two or three years. This election was the exclamation point on a very, very different Brookline." The two winning candidates were backed by homeowners and other groups calling for changes to the rent control law. Homeowners were frustrated by large increases in their property taxes.

In Town Meeting, the election brought a majority of homeowners to the legislative body for the first time in many years. Three years prior, homeowners only made up 20% of town meeting members. They were backed by the Coalition Against Unfair Taxation and other groups. The Brookline Tenant Union lost seats. The Coalition campaigned on the fact that private homes accounted for 40% of all property in town but paid 86% of the tax revenue. They also complained that high-income earners were living in rent-controlled apartments that should have gone to those of more limited means.

=== Article One ===
At the October Town Meeting, following a five-hour debate on Article One, also known as the Ames-Merrill housing compromise, a new by-law was adopted by a 133–97 vote. Under the by-law, rent control was to be phased out for all tenants in two- and three-family buildings except for elderly, disabled, or poor tenants. In buildings with three to ten units, units would be removed from rent controls when tenants vacated the apartments.

Owners of those larger buildings, however, would have to either contribute to a town housing fund or set aside 20% of their units for low-income tenants. If they did not, their units would not be removed from rent control. Tenants who were in a "set-aside" apartment could stay for life with below market rents set by the Rent Control Board, no matter how much their income grew in the future.

In response to the vote, the Brookline Tenants Union began circulating a petition calling for a referendum to repeal the new by-law. They did not submit the signatures and there was no referendum.

Tenant activists then claimed that housing providers were embarking on renovation projects in rent-controlled apartments after vacancy decontrol was enacted. This, they said, caused rents to go up, forcing out needy tenants and leaving behind only "financially secure tenants, whose presence in rent-control units had much to do with turning public opinion against rent control."

When planning for the end of rent control, only 3% of tenant in units that were losing their rent control protections identified as needy.

By January 1993, 1,200 apartments were decontrolled and thousands of other units that would have fallen under rent control if their owners moved out received decontrol certificates.

=== 1991 election ===
Rent control was called "the issue that Refuses to Go Away" in the 1991 election as it dominated all other concerns that year. It was called a litmus test for candidates and polarizing.

Tenant activists backed a tenant who ran for selectman and a slate of candidates for town meeting in order to repeal the phase out of rent control adopted the year before.The four major homeowners groups in town supported two candidates for the Board of Selectmen who were opposed to rent control; a fourth candidate called himself "independent" on the issue. The anti-rent control selectmen candidates won, which was seen as a referendum on Article One.

The campaigns were described as cutthroat, divisive, and bitter with the opposing camps using "communists" and "monied" as epitaphs for their opponents. One candidate for town meeting called it "class warfare."

=== Increased tax revenue ===
As rents rose, buildings would become more valuable and thus the amount they could be taxed would rise. It was estimated that the new by-law would add $550 million to the Town's tax base. This would add about $5 million in revenue to the Town, which would cut the average homeowner's tax bill by 5% or allow for additional services while spreading out the burden over additional taxpayers.

In 1992 alone, it was expected Brookline would take in an additional $800,000 in property tax revenue. The following year, an additional $48 million was added to the tax base. This came at a time of softening real estate marketing, helping to avoid cutting services or raising taxes.

== Statewide repeal ==
Rent control was repealed in 1994 via ballot initiative with an effective date of January 1, 1995. Massachusetts became the 27th state to ban rent control. When voters across the Commonwealth were debating the repeal, the Selectmen voted in favor of home rule petition that would allow them to keep rent control even if it was banned everywhere else.

Only Cambridge, Brookline, and Boston maintained active rent control systems, each under separate enabling acts, while Amherst had a rent review system, and Lowell, Waltham, and Somerville had enabling legislation authorizing rent control but no program in effect. Only Cambridge had a full system in place even though "by virtually all commonly accepted measures... [Cambridge had] the very opposite of a housing emergency" at the time.

After rent control was repealed, average rents rose 21 percent across all units in municipalities that had a rent control program before repeal.

=== Election results ===
Election results
| Jurisdiction | Yes | No |
|---|---|---|
| Statewide | 1,034,594 | 980,723 |
| Brookline | 9,184 | 11,677 |

At the November 8, 1994, state election, voters approved Question 9, abolishing rent control. The measure received 1,034,594 votes in favor and 980,723 votes against, or about 51 percent to 49 percent. Officials in Boston and Brookline blamed Cambridge for failing to modify its extreme version of rent control and upsetting voters enough to ban it statewide. Cambridge City Councilor Sheila Russell, who supported rent control, agreed. "If we had only listened to [the small property owners] and helped them out in the last five years, they would never have gone to this extreme," she said.

Although the initiative passed statewide, it lost in Brookline, where voters rejected it by 56 percent to 44 percent. It also lost in Boston and Cambridge, the other municipalities with rent control, but carried enough votes elsewhere in the state to prevail.

=== Attempts to undo the election ===
Within days of the election, Boston, Brookline, and Cambridge officials all worked to overturn the election and keep rent control in their communities. Brookline's Town Meeting also voted for a home rule petition to keep rent control a few weeks after the election.

=== Extension for some tenants ===
After the repeal, the Massachusetts General Court passed a law protecting low-income tenants in rent control apartments from being evicted for up to two years; full time students were not eligible. The bill was passed with less than two minutes left before the end of the legislative year on January 3, 1994.

== 21st century ==
Massachusetts has one of the lowest rates of new housing production anywhere in the country. In the years between 2012 and 2024, the rise in the median gross rent in Massachusetts rose nearly 30% faster than the median household income did across the Commonwealth. From 2000 to 2024, rent grew about 1% more per year than the consumer price index. In response, some have called for a return to rent control as a way to prevent tenants from being evicted and neighborhoods from becoming gentrified.

At the same time, the costs landlords have to maintain their properties grew even faster. In 2023 alone, property insurance rose 26%.

There is "a general consensus among economists" that instituting rent control would not solve the affordable housing crisis facing the state. The Brookings Institution wrote that "while rent control appears to help current tenants in the short run, in the long run it decreases affordability, fuels gentrification, and creates negative spillovers on the surrounding neighborhood."

At a special town meeting in November 2023, Town Meeting passed a home rule petition seeking to implement rent control by a vote of 112 to 107, with 13 abstentions. Rents could rise by the rate of inflation plus 3%, but could not exceed 7%. The baseline would be the rent 12 months before passage. Owner-occupied properties with four units or fewer would be exempt.

== Works cited ==
- Bloom, Robert M. (1 January 1974). "Chapter 19: Rent Control". Annual Survey of Massachusetts Law. 1974 (1).
- Moncreiff, Robert P. (23 September 1996). "The Repeal of Rent Control in Cambridge". New England Journal of Public Policy. 12 (1).
