= Robert Kuttner =

American journalist

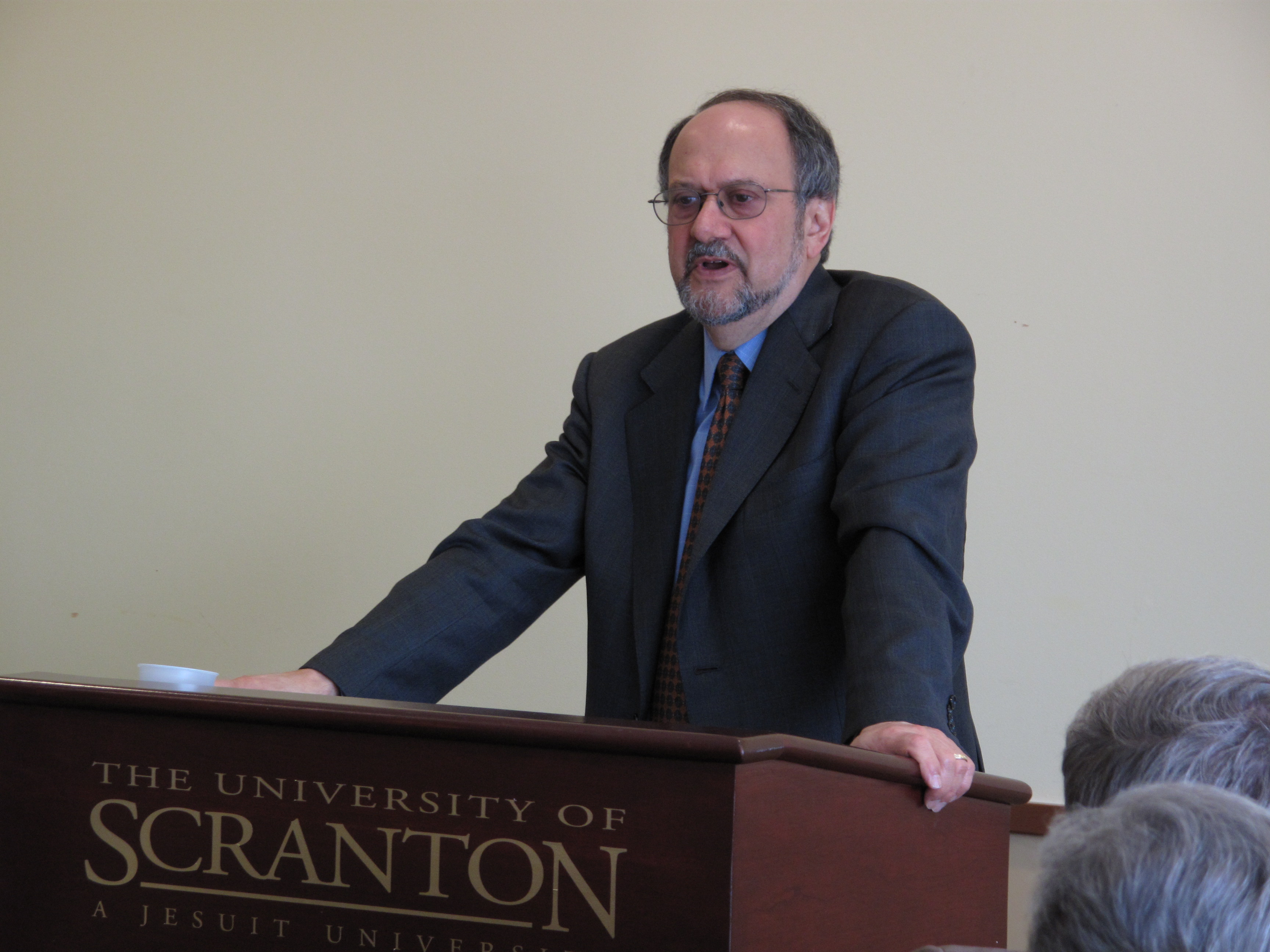
- Born: April 17, 1943 (age 83); New York City, New York, U.S.
- Education: Oberlin College (BA); London School of Economics; University of California, Berkeley (MA)
- Occupations: Journalist, Writer
- Spouse(s): Sharland Trotter (Deceased); Joan Fitzgerald

Robert L. Kuttner (/ˈkʌtnər/; born April 17, 1943) is an American journalist, university professor and writer whose works present a liberal and progressive point of view. Kuttner is the co-founder and current co-editor of The American Prospect, which was created in 1990 as an "authoritative magazine of liberal ideas," according to its mission statement. He was a columnist for Business Week and The Boston Globe for 20 years.

In 1986, Kuttner co-founded the Economic Policy Institute and currently serves on its executive committee. Between 2007 and 2014, Kuttner was a Distinguished Senior Fellow at Demos, a liberal research and policy center.

== Early life and education ==
Kuttner was born in New York City. He attended Oberlin College, the University of California, Berkeley, and the London School of Economics. He currently holds the Meyer and Ida Kirstein Chair at Brandeis University as a professor of social policy. He previously taught at Boston University, University of Oregon, University of Massachusetts Boston, and Harvard's Institute of Politics. He has also been a John F. Kennedy Fellow at Harvard University, a Woodrow Wilson Fellow at UC-Berkeley, a Guggenheim Fellow, a Wayne Morse Fellow, a German Marshall Fund Fellow, and a Radcliffe Public Policy Fellow.

He holds honorary degrees from Swarthmore College and Oberlin College.

== Writer and editor ==
Kuttner has had an extensive career as a writer and editor at various national publications.

In addition to his early work at Pacifica Radio, including a stint as general manager of WBAI-FM in New York, he served as Washington Editor of the Village Voice, editor of the journal Working Papers for a New Society, economics editor at The New Republic, and as a member of the national staff at the Washington Post. Between 1984 and 2005 he was one of five columnists for the "Economic Viewpoint" section (also titled "Economic Watch") of BusinessWeek, and he also served as a columnist for The Boston Globe in the 1980s and 1990s. His first job was an assistant to the independent journalist I.F. Stone.

His magazine writing has also appeared in The New York Review of Books, The New Yorker, The Atlantic, Harper's, Foreign Affairs, Foreign Policy, Harvard Business Review, Columbia Journalism Review, Washington Monthly, Dissent, and Political Science Quarterly. In the 1990s, he served as a national policy correspondent of The New England Journal of Medicine.

== Writings ==
External videos
- Booknotes interview with Kuttner on The End of Laissez-Faire, February 24, 1991, C-SPAN
- Presentation by Kuttner on Everything for Sale, March 26, 1997, C-SPAN
- Washington Journal interview with Kuttner on The Squandering of America, November 13, 2007, C-SPAN
- Presentation by Kuttner on The Squandering of America, November 26, 2007, C-SPAN
- Washington Journal interview with Kuttner on Obama's Challenge, November 8, 2008, C-SPAN
- Washington Journal interview with Kuttner on Presidency in Peril, May 5, 2010, C-SPAN

Kuttner is author of several books dealing with economics, politics, globalization and labor markets, as well as his political support for the revival of a robust labor-left agenda. His thirteen books include The Revolt of the Haves: Tax Rebellions and Hard Times (1980), The Economic Illusion: False Choices between Prosperity and Social Justice (1984), The Life of the Party: Democratic prospects in 1988 and beyond (1987), The End of Laissez-Faire: National Purpose and the Global Economy After the Cold War (1991), Everything For Sale: The Virtues and Limits of Markets (1997), and The Squandering of America: How the Failure of Our Politics Undermines Our Prosperity (Knopf, 2007). His 2008 book, Obama's Challenge: America's Economic Crisis and the Power of a Transformative Presidency, presented a vision of Barack Obama's opportunity to transform American politics. A 2010 sequel, A Presidency in Peril, warned that Obama was too close to Wall Street. His 2013 book, Debtors’ Prison: The Politics of Austerity versus Possibility, criticized austerity economics in the U.S. and Europe.

In his book, Can Democracy Survive Global Capitalism (Norton, 2018), Kuttner describes the role of globalized deregulation of capitalism in undercutting economic security and feeding the rise of the far-right.

His latest book is Going Big: FDR's Legacy, Biden's New Deal, and the Struggle to Save Democracy (New Press, 2022).

== Commentator ==
Kuttner has appeared as a commentator, usually offering a liberal view, on numerous public affairs and debate programs, including National Public Radio, the PBS Newshour, CNN, and MSNBC.

== Government service ==
Kuttner has served in several capacities within the federal government, including as an investigator for the Senate Committee on Banking, Housing and Urban Affairs, as well as serving as executive director of former President Carter's National Commission on Neighborhoods. At the Senate Banking Committee, Kuttner conducted the investigations that led to the Home Mortgage Disclosure Act, the Community Reinvestment Act, and the Foreign Corrupt Practices Act.

== Recognition ==
Kuttner has been recognized by various organizations for his career as a journalist, such as by the Sidney Hillman Award, which he won twice, once for his 1997 book Everything For Sale and again in 2008 for Obama's Challenge.

He has also been the recipient of the Paul Hoffman Award for Human Development of the United Nations, the Jack London Award for labor journalism, and the John Hancock Award "for excellence in business and financial journalism."

== Family ==
Kuttner is married to Joan Fitzgerald, Professor of Urban Policy and Public Affairs at Northeastern University, Boston. His first wife, the late Sharland Grace Trotter, was a psychotherapist and author. His daughter Jessica is a clinical social worker currently living in western Massachusetts, and his son Gabriel was a stage actor and director in Boston who died in October 2019.

== Bibliography ==
- The Revolt of the Haves: Tax Rebellions and Hard Times. Simon & Schuster, 1980.
- The Economic Illusion: False Choices between Prosperity and Social Justice. Houghton Mifflin, 1984.
- The Life of the Party: Democratic Prospects in 1988 and Beyond. Viking, 1987.
- The End of Laissez-Faire: National Purpose and the Global Economy After the Cold War. Knopf, 1991.
- Everything For Sale: The Virtues and Limits of Markets. Knopf, 1997.
- Family Re-Union: Reconnecting Parents and Children in Adulthood. Free Press, 2002.
- The Squandering of America: How the Failure of Our Politics Undermines Our Prosperity. Knopf, 2007.
- Obama's Challenge: America's Economic Crisis and the Power of a Transformative Presidency. Chelsea Green, 2008.
- A Presidency in Peril: The Inside Story of Obama's Promise, and the Struggle to Control our Economic Future. Chelsea Green, 2010.
- Debtors' Prison: The Politics of Austerity Versus Possibility. Knopf, 2013.
- Can Democracy Survive Global Capitalism. W.W. Norton & Company, 2018.
- The Stakes: 2020 and the Survival of American Democracy. W.W. Norton & Company, 2019.
- Going Big: FDR's Legacy, Biden's New Deal, and the Struggle to Save Democracy. New Press, 2022.
