= Herman B. Leonard =

American economist

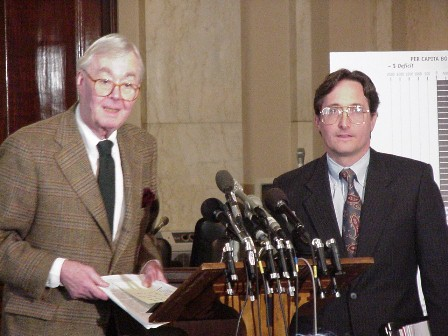
Leonard with Daniel Patrick Moynihan in December 1999

Herman B. Leonard is an American economist, currently the George F. Baker Jr. Professor of Public Management at Harvard Business School and Eliot I. Snider and Family Professor of Business Administration at John F. Kennedy School of Government.

He received his PhD in economics in 1979 from Harvard.

== Career ==
He is a member of the board of directors of Harvard Pilgrim Health Care. He was formerly a member of the board of directors of the ACLU of Massachusetts, the Hitachi Foundation, the Massachusetts Health and Education Facilities Authority, and of Civic Investments, a nonprofit organization that assists charitable enterprises with capital financing; a member of the Research and Education Advisory Panel of the General Accounting Office; a member of the Massachusetts Performance Enhancement Commission; and a member of the Alaska Governor's Council on Economic Policy.
