= Rent control in Cambridge, Massachusetts =

History of rent control and rent-control proposals in Massachusetts

Rent control in Cambridge, Massachusetts was a system of municipal regulations that limited rents and restricted evictions from covered housing. Cambridge adopted rent control in 1970 under authority granted by the Massachusetts legislature and the system remained in effect until a statewide ballot initiative abolished rent control effective January 1, 1995. The Cambridge Rent Control Board set maximum rents and regulated rent increases, evictions, and the removal of units from the rental market.

The system kept many controlled rents substantially below market rates and limited the conversion of rental housing to owner-occupied condominiums. Supporters maintained that these restrictions preserved rental housing and protected tenants from displacement. Opponents argued that they restricted owners’ use of their property and made it difficult to recover operating, repair, and improvement costs. Rent control was not means-tested, and studies found that many controlled apartments were occupied by students and high-income tenants.

Rent control became a central issue in Cambridge politics, producing tenant organizing, property-owner protests, litigation, and repeated efforts to modify the system. After failing to obtain substantial changes locally or through the courts and legislature, members of the Cambridge-based Small Property Owners Association led an initiative to restrict rent control throughout Massachusetts. Voters narrowly approved Question 9 in November 1994, although Cambridge voters rejected it by 58% to 42%.

Researchers have treated the end of Cambridge rent control as a natural experiment. Following repeal, rents and tenant turnover increased, while permitted residential investment more than doubled. Cambridge property values increased by approximately $7.8 billion during the following decade, with research attributing roughly $2 billion of that increase to decontrol. Much of the estimated gain occurred in nearby properties that had never been rent-controlled, indicating that the effects of the former system extended beyond the units directly subject to it.

== Background ==
=== Campaign for rent control ===
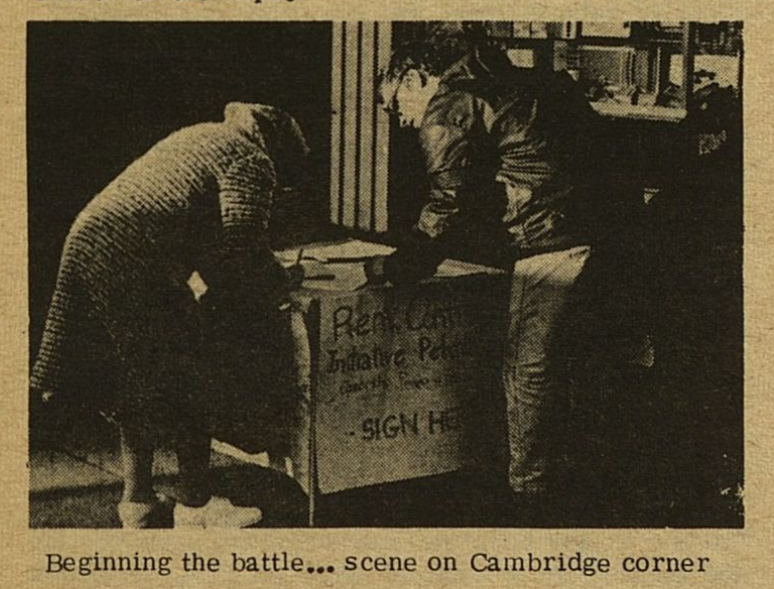
The Cambridge Peace & Freedom Party (Cambridge MDS) (Note: (disbanded in 1970)) tabling circa 1968/1969 as part of their broader effort to get 3,400 signatures to put rent control on the ballot.

In the late 1960s, rent control was debated in Cambridge. In 1968, the Cambridge Housing Convention was formed to start lobbying for affordable housing and, concurrently, the Peace and Freedom Party launched a campaign to place a rent control referendum on the local ballot.

In 1969, a group of students at Harvard University, who belonged to Students for a Democratic Society, complained that courses were taught with a 'liberal-establishment' bias and demanded courses with a more 'radical' approach. The university responded by creating a new course that included field work gathering signatures petitioning for rent control.

The referendum campaign concluded on September 11, 1969, after the election commission refused to place a measure on the ballot, ruling that state law did not allow municipalities to adopt rent control without approval from the Commonwealth. The decision sparked a protest at the commission's Green Street headquarters, resulting in 11 arrests for trespassing and 31 arrests for disturbing the peace.

=== Legislative adoption ===
On August 30, 1970, Governor Francis W. Sargent signed into law a bill that authorized rent control in municipalities with more than 50,000 residents, potentially affecting more than 40 communities. (Note: Chapter 842 of the Acts of 1970.) Municipalities that opted in were required to establish and administer local rent‑control programs consistent with the statute's standards. The statute froze maximum rents at the amounts charged six months before local adoption, creating an immediate rollback for units whose rents had risen during that period.

The Act applied broadly to existing rental housing but expressly exempted transient accommodations, dwellings built or converted after January 1, 1969, units already regulated under another governmental program, owner‑occupied two‑ and three‑family houses, cooperative or educational housing, and locally defined “luxury” apartments, provided no more than twenty‑five per cent of the locality's rental stock was excluded.

=== Adoption, repeal, and reenactment ===
On September 17, 1970, the Cambridge City Council adopted rent control by a 7–2 vote. Rents were rolled back to March 1970 levels and could be increased only with the approval of a locally appointed administrator.

The policy faced an immediate challenge on December 29, 1971, when a lame-duck city council voted to repeal rent control during a special meeting, amidst tenant protests at the Rindge Auditorium. This repeal was short-lived; on January 10, 1972, the newly inaugurated city council reinstated rent control by a 5–4 vote during its first meeting, establishing the framework for the system that ruled the city for the next several decades. The continuity of this system was secured on March 31, 1976, when the Massachusetts State Legislature passed a Cambridge petition to extend rent control just hours before the state enabling law was set to expire.

== Rent Control Board ==
The Cambridge Rent Control Board was composed of two landlords, two tenants who were usually recommended by the Tenants Union, and a chairman who was supposed to be impartial. They were appointed by the city manager.

=== Powers ===
Like other local rent-control boards, the Cambridge board approved or denied rent increases for individual units. Rent control boards were "akin to a quasi court" and had executive, legislative, and judicial powers. They passed new laws, enforced new laws, and judged whether or not their laws had been violated. The boards were empowered to set maximum rents, promulgate regulations, hold hearings, adjudicate petitions, and employ staff.

Before evicting a tenant from a rent-controlled unit, a landlord first had to secure a certificate of eviction from the board by establishing one of the statute's narrowly defined just causes:

1. non‑payment of rent;
2. the tenant's material violation of lease obligations or creation of a nuisance;
3. owner‑occupancy or occupancy by an immediate family member of the owner;
4. board‑approved plans for substantial rehabilitation or demolition; or
5. the landlord's permanent withdrawal of the dwelling from the rental market.

Board decisions were subject to de novo review in the district court. Violations, including willful overcharges, unlawful evictions, living in a condo you owned, or not renting a controlled unit were punishable as criminal offenses. Between 1986 and 1990, the Rent Control Board pressed criminal charges against six landlords.

=== Fair net operating income ===
Landlords could petition for rent increases only when necessary to obtain a “fair net operating income,” a benchmark that directed boards to consider six specified factors: changes in property‑tax assessments, unavoidable increases in operating costs, capital improvements, alterations in services, physical deterioration, and the cost of normal repairs. In one case, the Rent Control Board considered a loss of $23,000 over three years to be "a fair net profit" for a property owner.

Mortgage expenses were not allowed to be considered when calculating an approved rent. Legal and management fees were also not allowed to be passed on to tenants, and neither was lost rent due to non-payment. The chairman of the Small Property Owners Association complained this was unfair given "all the record keeping, minutia, logs, filings and considerable headaches associated with ownership of a rent-controlled building" and that "all owners know that to go to the rent board without legal representation is to leave without your kneecaps."

The rents the Rent Control Board allowed private housing providers to collect was half the rents tenants of government-subsidized housing developments paid.

=== Administrative ===
Rents were based on 1967 levels. By 1990, 42% of rent-controlled apartments had never received an adjustment to cover increased operating expenses. That year, 9.9% of housing providers did not receive a general rent adjustment because they did not file the required paperwork with the Board. In fiscal year 1990, there were 1,238 cases brought before the Board. Of those, 33 were tenant complaints.

The Rent Control Board heard roughly 1,200 cases initiated by housing providers in 1993, up from 800 in 1992. That year, they took about two months to issue a ruling on average, with rent adjustment cases taking 85 days and evictions taking 33 days. In 1983, it took 75 days to process an eviction case and 195 days, or 6.5 months, to process a rent adjustment. Cases sometimes dragged on for two years.

=== Adversarial relationships ===
Hearings were recorded and extensive documentation was required contributing to a judicial atmosphere and exacerbating tensions between tenants, housing providers, the rent control boards and their examiners. Housing providers bore the burden of proof during the evidentiary hearings. While housing providers were faced the burden of proof when requesting increases in rent to pay for repairs and upkeep of their properties, tenants were able to withhold rent in response to alleged faults with their units without providing any evidence.

Small property owners who moved out of state needed to return to Massachusetts every time they wished to raise rents or make other changes so that they could appear in person before the rent control boards.

After a rent increase request took 13 months to process, one housing provider stopped requesting them, even though she continued to spend money to make improvements to the property. Both tenants and housing providers agreed that the process took too long, required too much paperwork, and contributed to an adversarial relationship.

=== Staff and budget ===
The Cambridge City Council appropriated $297,000 to the Rent Control Board in 1982, but authorized them to spend up to $610,000. The Rent Control Board then added a 1% surcharge to rents in the city to bring in more money to hire additional staff. By 1985, the annual budget was $700,000, or $40 for every rent-controlled unit.

The board's administration had a budget of $1.5 million in 1993. When rent control was repealed in 1994, the Cambridge Rent Control Board had an annual budget of $1.3 million and a staff of 25 full-time and 8 part-time employees.

== 707 program changes ==
A state law change in 1992 changed a housing subsidy program known as Section 707. Under the old system, tenants paid 30% of their income in rent and the state paid for the rest. Under the new program, tenants received a voucher worth a lump sum amount, and the tenant was responsible for anything above that amount.

Under the new system, tenants with Section 707 vouchers came under rent control, while previously they did not. As a result, the rents housing providers received were slashed from market levels to rent-controlled levels, affecting the owners of 350 apartments around Cambridge. "If the units go back under rent control," one housing provider said, "I know we'll lose the building because there's no way we can pay the mortgage and maintain it."

=== Allen ===
Charles Allen, a carpenter, and his wife, Joan, purchased a dilapidated rooming house that was on the verge of being condemned. With nine employees and a mortgage of $400,000, they renovated the 12-unit building for 30 months. When complete, they moved into one unit and rented the others to 11 low income roommates.

The Allens were strong supporters of rent control but said the law change made it impossible to make the building work financially if their rents were reduced to the levels allowed by the Rent Control Board. "All our blood, sweat, and tears is going to be gone as well as our home," Joan said. "I feel really swindled because we took a building in deplorable condition that would have eventually been condemned and gave 11 low-income people a roof over their heads. I might become homeless myself if this happens."

=== Yogel ===
Eric Yogel had several apartments with tenants who were subsidized by the 707 program. When the program changed, the amount of rent he was able to collect dropped from $770 for a three-bedroom apartment to no more than $320. Yogel, like others, could not earn enough money under rent control to cover his expenses.

When he refused to sign vouchers for his tenants, they sued him for discrimination. In January 1993, Cambridge Eviction Free Zone protested outside of Yogel's office and the tenants filed complaints with the Cambridge Human Rights Commission. Yogel said it was he who was being discriminated against: "Either I can be a good guy and sign the voucher and take the economic losses on the chin or if I don't sign I am charged with discrimination."

== Condo conversions ==
In the 1970s, conversions of apartments to condominiums began to take off. The conversion process was described as "a relatively easy and convenient form of escape from rent controls" that allowed owners to sell the units for twice what they would have been worth as rent-controlled apartments.

The Rental Housing Association of the Greater Boston Real Estate Board said in 1975 that condos "are such a logical outgrowth of rent control and runaway inflation that they must be reckoned with." During the first 7 years of rent control, 5,000 rent-controlled apartments were converted in Boston, Brookline, and Cambridge. According to the Boston Globe, it was "because sizable profits can be made and because rent control... inhibits rental income and can give landlords other headaches as well." Roughly 10% of rent-controlled units were converted before it was effectively outlawed.

Supporters said the permit systems preserved rental housing by preventing apartments from being converted one by one into owner-occupied condominiums. Opponents argued that the restrictions made it harder for moderate-income buyers to purchase converted apartments and limited owners' ability to sell their property.

By 1988, few apartment buildings in communities with rent control were being converted to condominiums, which supporters described as evidence that the regulations were working.

=== Adoption of conversion restrictions ===
Because the conversions represented a loss of units from the rental housing stock, the City Council adopted a law in August 1979 making it illegal to convert the units without the consent of the Rent Control Board. The measure passed by a 5–3 vote. (Note: The ordinance was adopted under authority granted to the city by a 1976 act of the Great and General Court.) The city solicitor had advised the council not to adopt the law, saying that the state had not granted the City Council the authority to regulate condominium conversions.

The restrictions faced opposition from property owners, but also from rent-controlled tenants who believed they were being unfairly prevented from purchasing their apartments.

=== Owners were prohibited from living in their own units ===
The Boston Globe described the condominium-permit systems in Brookline and Cambridge as a "confusing maze of regulations," with overlapping exemptions, changing timetables, and lawsuits. Officials there called the rules simple in theory, but also acknowledged that the process had become difficult to explain.

If the Rent Control Board granted a conversion permit and the owner wanted to sell the unit, the owner then had to bring the tenant before the board in a separate proceeding to obtain an eviction permit. If the board granted the eviction permit, the owner then had to obtain a court order authorizing the eviction. No hearing could be held before the sale, meaning that prospective buyers could not know whether the board would allow them to occupy the unit, even if they intended to use it as their home.

Even if a home was not covered under rent control, the seller needed to obtain a certificate from the Rent Control Board before they could sell it to someone who wished to live in it themselves. Larry Tye of The Boston Globe, who was selling his home, said the requirement "created nightmares for many homeowners like me." He produced a "fastidiously researched application" that was "a half-inch thick and included documents dating back 14 years."

A tenant living in a rent-controlled unit could legally purchase and occupy it, provided that the tenant had occupied the unit before August 10, 1979. A tenant who moved in after that date could purchase the unit but would have to move out and rent it to someone else. These rules could produce mixed buildings in which some units remained subject to rent control while others did not. Even when an existing tenant was legally eligible to purchase and occupy a unit, however, the conversion still required the board's approval.

=== Enforcement ===
Owners were also prohibited from making repairs or renovations that required tenants to vacate their apartments, even temporarily, without the Rent Control Board's permission. David Wylie, the city councilor who drafted the ordinance, said it was "intended to be tightly drawn to make it difficult for owners to get board permission."

As of October 1980, fewer than 15 permits had been granted. According to Peter Stanton, executive director of the Cambridge Rent Control Board, "the great majority" of permit applications were rejected. Because only "a handful" of applications were approved, the restrictions amounted to "a freeze" on condominium conversions. Violations were punishable by fines of $500 per day, one year in jail, or both.

In 1991, Cambridge had 7,000 condominiums, approximately 2,000 of which were subject to rent control. Of those, 800 had never sought a rent adjustment, leading the Rent Control Board to believe that the units were being illegally occupied by their owners. The city investigated 85 owners by 1993, with hearings held in six cases "for the crime of living in their own units." Rent Control Board staff did research at the Registry of Deeds, talked to mail carriers, and checked the return address of letters sent to the rent control board.

Sellers found their units difficult to sell because purchasers could not occupy them. On average, a condominium subject to rent control sold for 35% less than one that was not.

=== Owner-occupants feared being prosecuted ===
Owners feared being discovered as occupants of the units they owned, as happened to one woman after her neighbor, an activist with the Cambridge Tenants Union, filed a complaint with the Rent Control Board. The activist also named as defendants in the case the real estate professionals who helped her buy the unit. The son of the woman illegally living in the condo she owned gave up going to college so his mother could pay her legal bills. The owner was facing nearly $1,000,000 in fines and developed anorexia and depression. The owner did not register to vote or take part in the census to hide from the rent control board.

A Chinese woman who was so terrified of being arrested for living in the condo she owned moved out of it, became homeless, and rented it out. The rent she collected did not cover her mortgage expenses. A young single man bought a condo and lived in it, but later married and had children. The children shared a bedroom while he and his wife slept in the living room. He could not sell it because the mortgage was $1,100 a month, but the Rent Control Board set rents at $400. "When one of us wants to go to bed at night," he said, "the other one has to read in the bathroom."

An attorney representing a condominium owner who violated the law by moving into a unit she owned said, "There is something fundamentally wrong with telling people they cannot live in their own property." Others established "elaborate trusts or other schemes to hide true ownership." In one case, the estate of a deceased dog was made the owner of a condominium to allow the deceased dog's human owner to live there.

Because it was illegal to purchase and occupy a condominium without a "removal permit," several condominium owners protested at City Council meetings while wearing bags over their heads to conceal their identities and prevent their arrest. Some owners testified at the Statehouse on bills that would impact rent control wearing disguises. "I'm on the run," said one owner who was wearing a fake beard and sunglasses, and who gave a fake name to lawmakers.

=== Legal challenges ===
The City Council further tightened the regulations by adopting an amendment that prohibited landlords from selling rent-controlled units to real-estate investors. Local landlords challenged the ordinance three months after its adoption, but the Massachusetts Supreme Judicial Court upheld its validity.

In a 1992 lawsuit challenging the Constitutionality of the rent control law, one of the plaintiffs was listed simply as Jane Doe. She was worried that if her true identity was revealed, the city would evict her from her home.

== Notable Cambridge cases ==
=== Antioch Temple ===
In May 1985, the Antioch Temple, a Pentecostal church, attempted to evict a woman who had been living in the church's rectory since September 1982. She had been previously forced out of her Roxbury apartment and the church allowed her to move in "out of charity." The church did not charge her rent, but did require her to join the church and pay a tithe of $125 a month in order to move in; market rate rent for the house was $700-$800.

After moving in, the tenant had resigned her membership in the church, stopped attending services, and owed more than $1,700 in pledges to the church. The church wanted her to leave so the pastor could move back in.

The tenant, Catherine Deloney, was living there with her two daughters, her son, and two grandchildren, did not want to move and asked the Rent Control Board to declare that she was protected by the rent control law. She also testified that poor conditions in the house was why she withheld rent. The Rent Control Board ruled that a parish house, though not specifically mentioned in the enabling legislation, fell under the charitable exemption and she thus could be evicted.

=== Begelfer ===
In December 1990, the Rent Control Board acknowledged it made an error in a calculation five years prior. When it was discovered, the Rent Control Board slashed rents by 27% and ordered MacDavis Begelfer, the housing provider, to repay the tenants more than $113,000. Tenants who had previously lived in the building were also entitled to file for repayment.

Begelfer argued that he had already spent most of that money on capital improvements to the building and, since tenants had started withholding rents, he was forced to take out loans to cover the costs of the building. Tenants and the Cambridge Tenants Union argued that they were the victims and deserved compensation.

=== Bologna ===
In 1984, Vincent Bologna, a Sicilian immigrant and United States Navy veteran, purchased a dilapidated, abandoned house in Cambridge. He renovated the building himself, hauling away 55 truckloads of trash and restoring the building, including remedying all 60 code violations.

He turned the building into a two-family home, and moved his family into the 800-square-foot rear apartment. He rented the front apartment to Drs. Krenie and Marie Stowe, a psychiatrist and her daughter, a student at Harvard Law School. The Stowes sublet out rooms in their apartment.

The Cambridge Rent Control Board ruled that because the property had once been a rooming house, even though it was illegally operating as one in violation of the local zoning laws, it was covered by rent control. Because of this, they ruled Bologna had been overcharging the Stowes, who made a combined income of $110,000 a year in 1986.

The Board ordered Bologna to convert the house back into a rooming house and to slash the rent he was charging the Stowes by $1,000 a month. The Stowes then sued Bologna for retroactive overcharges, plus triple damages and legal fees. Their lawyer encouraged them not to pay any rent, as Bologna did not have enough assets to pay more than $100,000 in fees and damages. The Bologna family faced foreclosure and bankruptcy as a result. They also lost another rental property that they owned because they could not keep up with the mounting legal bills while not receiving rent from the Stowes for five years.

The Cambridge Zoning Board then refused to allow Bologna to convert the home back into a rooming house as it violated the zoning laws. Bologna and his family were ordered by the Rent Control Board to live in a one-bedroom apartment in a converted garage.

=== Bray ===
At 149-151 Putnam Ave, one tenant stopped paying rent in 1976, and all tenants stopped paying their rent in 1984. For the latter group, arguing that the building was dilapidated. Robert Bray purchased the building in 1987 and spent $25,000 to upgrade it. When the tenants still refused to pay rent, Bray asked for an eviction permit from the Rent Control Board so that he could then seek an eviction in court.

The Rent Control Board said, however, that the paperwork was filled out incorrectly and denied his request. One of the Rent Control Board members was a tenant in the building. His lawyer was, three months prior to the hearing, the general counsel to the Rent Control Board. Bray contended that this posed a conflict of interest

Bray also contended that the tenants locked him out of the building and, on three occasions, refused to let an exterminator into the building to spray for bugs.

=== Cellucci ===
Cambridge's building commissioner, Joseph Cellucci, inherited a two-family home from him father with his siblings. Though he knew it should be covered under the rent control law, he charged the tenants market rent. He did not file the required paperwork with the city to place it under the Rent Control Board's jurisdiction until he and his family were caught. Though it was a criminal offense, Cellucci's boss, City Manager Robert Healy, said no charges would be filed if the owners complied with the rent control regulations.

=== Cooper ===
Chester Cooper purchased a four-family home in 1978 for $25,000. The water meter reader then used his carpentry skills and loans to renovate the interiors, adding new kitchens and bathrooms, heating systems, and other amenities in the units. The rents the Rent Control Board allowed him to receive did not allow him to recover his costs for these renovations.

One of his tenants was an elderly woman whose rent was subsidized by Section 8. Under the terms of that program, Cooper received a full market rent of $648 a month. When she died in January 1994, the Rent Control Board ruled he could only charge a new tenant $302 a month. Cooper said that was "an absurd rent that doesn't even cover my nuisance cost."

Rather than rent it out for less than half of what he previously received, Cooper announced that he would leave it vacant. It was illegal in Cambridge to leave an apartment vacant for more than 120 days, and the Rent Control Board signaled their intention to prosecute him, as they had prosecuted others. "If I have to go to jail for being a homeowner, I choose to go to jail," the father of 10 said. Cooper also alerted the police and said he would prosecute any squatters who tried to move into the apartment.

Starting in 1989, his house was adorned with dozens of colorful signs lambasting rent control and the rich Cambridge residents who lived in rent-controlled apartments. When the city ordered him to remove them, which they called an eyesore but which had become a tourist attraction, he refused. "Someday the signs will come off because there will be no more rent control, and they won't come off before that day," Cooper said. "I only hope I am alive to see it."

Cooper died a few weeks later. His family and friends vowed to keep the signs up in his memory, until rent control was abolished, in accordance with his wishes. Other rent control opponents vowed to buy the home, if necessary, to keep the signs in place.

=== Coughlin ===
A city ordinance required the rent control board to issue a permit allowing one or more rent-controlled units to be removed from the provisions of rent control before the city could issue a demolition permit. In January 1989, the owners of 189-191 Hampshire Street told the state Building Code Appeals Board that their building was dangerous in its current condition and that they could not afford to make repairs. They asked for permission to tear it down instead. In July, the state board agreed and ordered Cambridge to issue the permit. The city then took the owners to court to prevent them from tearing it down and removing rent-controlled apartments.

=== Harrop ===
Daniel S. Harrop purchased a home on Mt. Auburn Street and planned to move from Rhode Island and into the house. He attempted to evict the tenants, two young Harvard graduates, under a provision that allowed owners to move into houses they owned. The tenants, however, refused to leave. "This is where I want to leave," she said.

After seven months of hearings, while Harrop lived with relatives, the Rent Control Board agreed to let him evict the tenants. The following month, however, they reversed course and granted a new hearing to the tenants.

The tenant had originally rented the house for $1,400 a month. She later discovered that it was covered by rent control, however, and that the legal rent was only $221 a month. She then stopped paying any rent at all.

=== McAdams ===
Cambridge prohibited any apartment from being vacant for more than 120 days. (Note: Ordinance 966 was passed in 1984.) Those who violated the law were subject to a $500 a day fine and jail time.

Because of the low rents owner John McAdams was receiving, he was unable to repair several of his apartments on Broadway to make them habitable. He testified to the rent control board that it would cost more than $45,000 to make them legally habitable. The board allowed McAdams to receive between $144 and $192 a month for the apartments, about a quarter of what the apartments could command if they were not rent-controlled.

When they sat vacant longer than 120 days, criminal charges were filed against him and a warrant was issued for his arrest. The Cambridge Police Department then broke into the apartments with the activist group Eviction Free Zone so that four families could move in without McAdams' knowledge or consent. Several city councilors were also present. The squatters then put new locks on the doors. Mayor Alice Wolf said she recognized that squatting in the apartments was "an illegal action," but supported the squatters and visited them in the apartments.

=== McBride ===
When a wall sank causing damage to a four-unit rent controlled building on Hilliard Street near Harvard Square, the two elderly women who owned it sold it to their nephew, John McBridge. He purchased it for $150,000 and expected to pay about $200,000 in mortgage principal and interest by the time it was renovated and sold again.

He planned to spend $270,000 to do a gut rehab of the building, plus $40,000 to shore up the wall that had sank. He then found a buyer who was willing to pay $295,000 for the property, as long as it was restored to its original condition as a single family house.

McBride petitioned the Rent Control Board for permission to convert it and then agreed, provided he pay the city $100,000. McBride called the request "extortion." He instead offered to donate five hours of his time a week for one year to a non-profit that built low-income housing. The Rent Control Board rejected this in kind offer worth $13,000.

After nine months of hearings with the Rent Control Board, McBride's buyer walked away. The Rent Control Board's executive director, in response to a comment that the demand for $100,000 would cause McBride to lose money, said "Are we supposed to protect people from bad business deals?"

The Rent Control Board was willing to let McBride increase the rents on the apartments if he repaired them and restored them as rent-controlled units. However, the rents the Rent Control Board would allow were still so low that he could not secure bank financing to make the repairs. As a result, the building sat empty, dilapidated, and a magnet for vandals.

Margaret Rey, who lived a few doors down, said it was "outrageous" and that "It's impossible how they are acting. That house goes down, down, down, by now it's a tenement house, and [the Rent Control Board] sit there and doesn't kow what to do, they sit on their rules."

=== Petrillo ===
Peter and Helen Petrillo owned a three-family house in Cambridge. They lived in one unit, rented a second unit to Helen's brother, and rented a third unit to another tenant. When their daughter's home burned down, the Petrillos moved into the basement to give their daughter, her husband, and their three children their unit.

The Rent Control Board ruled that it was now a four-unit building and thus subject to rent control. They ordered the Petrillos to slash their tenant's rent and to pay them damages. The tenant was given two years free rent in addition to $10,500.

Additionally, because the basement ceiling was too low, the board ordered the Petrillos to jack up the entire house, at their expense, to create a legal apartment. The board refused a request to allow the basement to be restored to its previous unfinished state. Three days after the board's ruling, Peter died of a heart attack. Peter's "heart attack was a result of the stress from the hearings. It was just too much for him," according to Helen.

Petrillo was featured in television advertisements for the statewide repeal campaign. After the election, she said she was thrilled with the support voters showed to people like herself: "I was a victim, and I don't like to see other people get hurt like I was," she said.

=== Pu ===
In August 1986, Glenn and Katherine Pu purchased a house to raise their three children in. Glenn was a student and Katherine did not work. Though it was not registered as a boarding house, there were several unrelated people living in the house prior to the Pu's purchase. After the sale, the tenants went to the Rent Control Board, who ruled that the building was not a single family house but was instead a seven-unit apartment building and thus subject to rent control.

The family could not afford to pay the $165 application fee for each of the seven bedrooms they wished to take off of the rental market. Neither was any of the individual rooms big enough for the family of five to inhabit, so the house instead sat empty. While the family battled with the rent control board, there were anonymous phone calls that included racial slurs threatening to burn the building down.

=== Riverside Cambridgeport Community Corporation ===
The Riverside Cambridgeport Community Corporation purchased properties on six sites in 1981 with the intention of owning them as a non-profit and keeping them affordable for tenants. When the buildings fell into disrepair, the tenants stopped paying their rent. The Rent Control Board refused to allow the Community Corporation to evict the 11 non-paying tenants and then ruled, instead, that the non-profit owed the tenants reparations. As a result, the non-profit was unable to pay the mortgage and the eight community banks which provided financing foreclosed on them.

Both the Community Corporation and the tenants were supporters of rent control, leading the Small Property Owners Association, which opposed rent control, to say that if "one of rent control's strongest proponents... can't make it work, how in the hell does he expect us to make it work?" The properties ended up in a federal bankruptcy court.

=== Tarvezian ===
In 1990, George Tarvezian owned a six-unit rent-controlled property that was "clearly distressed" on Prospect Street. He was in the process of selling it to a non-profit when a judge found him guilty of illegally not renting out several the apartments and ordered him to either sell the property or immediately rent them out. At the time, two units were rented and a squatter was in the third. The non-profit said the building needed a gut rehab and estimated it would cost $50,000 per unit.

Tarvezian served six months in jail and was fined $3,000.

=== Other Rent Control Board decisions ===
Hong Lu, who spoke English as a second language, was unable to adequately represent herself when she appeared before the rent control board. They ordered her to rent rooms at $250, well below the $450 rent charged by the nearby YMCA. She was forced to borrow money to pay her bills.

When Roberta Dowling took more than 120 days to rent a vacant apartment in 1990, she was fined $25,000. Steven Kapsalis was sentenced to six months in jail when he removed a rental unit from the market without permission from the Rent Control Board.

Emil and Donna Javorski originally lived in a unit they owned, but later moved. The rent control board convicted them of not living in their own home before the Javorskis filed a change of address form.

A survey conducted by the Rent Control Board in the late 1970s showed that a 14% increase in rents should be given; the Board voted for a 6% increase.

The Rent Control Board set the rent for June Sekera's condo at $190 a month; Sekera's mortgage and condo fee were $1,250 a month.

John F. Natale said he was "imprisoned in 3 1/2 rooms with his wife and two kids" because, if he moved out, the apartment would be subject to rent control. He would not be able to afford to pay market rate rents elsewhere while collecting below-market rents on his controlled apartment, he said.

== Rent-controlled units went to the rich ==
Cambridge’s rent control system was not means-tested, allowing tenants to occupy rent-controlled apartments regardless of their income. Housing providers were thus incentivized to rent to the wealthy and avoid low- and moderate-income tenants, as well as the elderly, disabled, or families with children.

Critics consequently described the system as “welfare for the rich" and the Boston Globe Editorial Board, which had previously supported rent control, opined in 1993 that as "practiced in Cambridge, rent control is flawed and unprincipled" because 30% or more of tenants were "well-off."

=== Lack of means-testing ===
There was no requirement that rent-controlled apartments be rented to low-income tenants; at least 20 percent of all rent-controlled apartments housed the rich. The vast majority housed middle- and high-income earners, with the majority going to people with professional, technical, and managerial jobs. Many tenants were wealthier than their landlords.

Rent-controlled apartments also had a disproportionate number of people in their prime earning years. Mayor Ken Reeves was cited as a prime example of "a permanent class of young professionals... who found cheap apartments in their youth and now refuse to budge."

During the statewide repeal campaign in 1993, Michael Turk, president of the Cambridge Tenants Union and the best-known tenant activist in Cambridge, was living in the same rent-controlled apartment he had occupied as a graduate student 20 years earlier. A member of the Cambridge Tenants Union acknowledged the broader pattern, saying, "I've seen that trend over time."

According to MIT economist Jonathan Gruber, the reason that rent-controlled apartments tend to go to the rich is that they already have well-paying jobs. It is the poor who move from place to place in search of better opportunities, which means they lose out on the benefits of a rent-controlled apartment. "It really was a bad idea, and it continues to be a bad idea," Gruber said. "It's against basic economics."

=== Demographics of tenants ===
==== Income and rent burden ====
The 1990 federal census "confirmed that most rent-controlled units in Cambridge are priced well below market value, tend to be in the better locations of the city, and are generally occupied by the income-advantaged, who pay a much lower portion of their income in rent than is usual." The median household income in rent-controlled apartments was more than double that of tenants in low-income subsidized housing, while the rent-to-income ratio of rent-controlled tenants was much lower than that of public-housing tenants.

A study by Rolf Goetze titled "Rent Control: Affordable Housing for the Privileged, Not The Poor" found in August 1994 that the median income per tenant in a rent-controlled apartment was $1,060 more than it was in a market rate apartment.

A 1983 study by Abt found one-third of rent-controlled tenants had incomes above the median, while 58% of tenants in non-rent-controlled apartments had incomes below the median. That study counted students at Harvard, MIT, and other Cambridge universities, as low-income as they unemployed.

A study conducted by the city’s Community Development Department found that half of tenants in rent-controlled apartments spent 20% or less of their income on rent, compared with the standard affordability threshold of 30%. Approximately 1,500 rent-controlled households had incomes exceeding 150% of the median income.

==== Upper-status professionals ====
Upper-status professionals were overrepresented in surveys of rent-controlled tenants, particularly among occupants of rent-controlled condominiums. In 1988, 39% of the lawyers and 32% of the doctors living in Cambridge occupied rent-controlled apartments. Three judges also lived in rent-controlled apartments. Another study counted 298 rent-controlled households headed by lawyers, 265 by architects, 259 by professors, 246 by doctors, 220 by engineers, and 173 by consultants. Two-thirds of those living in rent-controlled apartments had bachelor’s or master’s degrees.

==== Race and household composition ====
A 1984 MIT study found that students and young professionals occupied more than half of rent-controlled apartments. Most rent-controlled apartments in the late 1980s and early 1990s were occupied by white, single tenants, while relatively few housed families or elderly tenants. Poor people, elderly people, and families were no more likely to live in rent-controlled apartments than in non-rent-controlled apartments.

One account attributed this distribution partly to high demand for housing in Cambridge, which allowed landlords to favor higher-income applicants who did not receive public subsidies. Tenants who could afford market-rate units consequently occupied rent-controlled apartments, depriving lower-income tenants of more affordable housing.

Despite making up 25% of the population of Cambridge, only 12% of rent-controlled apartments in Cambridge housed people of color. The scarcity of housing hit families, and Black families especially, the hardest.

==== Unmet housing need ====
In 1970, the Cambridge Housing Authority had 1,700 families on its waiting list for low-income housing. This grew to 3,500 families in January 1991; by the end of that year, the list had grown to 5,200. There was also a visible homeless population.

=== Cambridge's wealthy tenants ===
Prominent and affluent residents of rent-controlled apartments included at least one multimillionaire in 1991, three judges, a state senator, and a vice president of MIT.

Other tenants included wealthy suburban residents who maintained inexpensive Cambridge apartments for use when visiting the city for business or pleasure. One property owner rented out a three-family house for $1,200 a month while living in a rent-controlled apartment costing her $250 a month, and some rent-controlled tenants owned vacation homes. One lawyer said that the money he saved on rent allowed him to purchase a house, buy multiple cars, and pay off “a couple of yuppie credit cards, the whole shooting match."

William H. Walsh, a Cambridge city councilor who earned more than $100,000 in 1986 while living in a nine-room, rent-controlled apartment, said it was a “myth" that rent-controlled apartments were reserved for low- and moderate-income tenants. He said that neither he nor the other residents of his building fit that description.

At one Porter Square development, a 1986 survey found that 70% of tenants earned more than $40,000 a year while paying as little as $350 a month for a two-bedroom apartment that included heat, hot water, and electricity; the federal median income was $37,000 in 1987.

The chairman of the Small Property Owners Association said that many of the tenants were wealthier than the owners of the properties they lived in. One professional described his rent as “ridiculously low" and said that he could still afford the apartment if the rent doubled. A Cambridge tenant activist similarly acknowledged that “some rents are ridiculously low" and said that “there’s no way to determine what is fair."

=== Opposition to means testing ===
Tenant advocacy organizations opposed means-testing and proposals to limit rent-controlled apartments according to tenants’ needs were rejected. In 1987, Walsh said that “the elderly, families, and minorities are getting little or no benefit from rent control." His proposal to amend the law to target benefits for poor tenants, people with disabilities, and elderly tenants was opposed by the Cambridge Tenants Union.

In 1990, WCVB broadcast a three-part series showing “judges, television executives, lawyers, and others" living in rent-controlled apartments at below-market rents. Reeves was interviewed for the series as a rent control supporter but called the final product a "hatchet job." The soon-to-be-mayor made $43,400 as a part-time city councilor, plus income as an attorney, and lived in a rent-controlled apartment. He opposed means testing for rent-controlled apartments.

The City Council subsequently rejected a motion to institute means testing to prevent the "use and abuse of the Rent Control System in Cambridge by the haves to the detriment of the have-nots" by "wealthy squatters." Instead, they adopted a resolution criticizing WCVB for broadcasting the series and landlords for renting to the rich instead of the poor, saying it indicated "discriminatory practices are occurring against lower income people."

Another proposal in 1991 to tax tenants in rent-controlled apartments if their incomes exceeded 150% of the federal median income was killed before it reached the city council floor. Instead, tenant activists called for the creation of a city-funded "Housing Access Office" to help those who were not well-connected find rent-controlled apartments. The chairman of the Small Property Owners Association said she believed everyone in Cambridge should contribute to a housing subsidy program, not just the 900 owners who owned properties subject to rent control.

== Notable tenants ==
Some of Cambridge's "most visible public citizens" lived in rent-controlled apartments. They included

- Ruth Abrams, a Justice of the Massachusetts Supreme Judicial Court, lived in a rent-controlled apartment on Memorial Drive overlooking the Charles River and the Boston skyline. She paid $624 a month for the apartment, which included heat and hot water. (Note: Abrams earned a salary of $90,400 in 1994, the year rent control was repealed.)
- Howie Carr, journalist at the Boston Herald, WRKO, and Boston Magazine. Carr, who criticized Senator Wetmore for living in a rent-controlled apartment "in the post 02138 ZIP code," also had a rent-controlled apartment next to Harvard's Sackler Museum.
- Frederik, Crown Prince of Denmark, rented a house with a large front porch, four bedrooms, five fireplaces, a parlor, a living room, and maid's quarters on a quiet side street near Harvard Square. Terry Morriss, the executive director of the Rent Control Board, said royalty living in a rent-controlled house proved the system was working. "Rent control is not income-based," he said.
- David O. Ives, president and chairman of the board of WBGH, paid $631 a month for a rent-controlled house on Mt. Auburn Street. (Note: Ives earned a six figure salary in 1992.)
- Kenneth Reeves, the mayor of Cambridge at the time rent control was repealed in Massachusetts, was living in the same rent-controlled apartment he lived in as a Harvard Law School student in 1973. Reeves made $43,400 as a part-time city councilor, plus income as an attorney at the time. His rent was $425 a month, which included heat and hot water. The market rate rent for a similar apartment was $720.
- Robert D. Wetmore, a state senator from Barre in western Worcester County, stayed in a rent-controlled apartment when the legislature was in session. Because it was rent-controlled, he could not be evicted so that someone who wanted the apartment full time could have it.

== Politics of rent control ==
When rent control was first enacted, it was only a peripheral issue in Cambridge politics. It quickly became a central issue in every election that followed, however. Several city councilors lived in rent-controlled apartments. It was described as "the Nation's most Draconian version of rent control."

=== Cambridge Tenants Organizing Committee ===
The Cambridge Tenants Organizing Committee (CTOC), which described itself as "radical and anticapitalist," was founded in 1970.

In 1975, the Rent Control Board approved an increase in rents to bring housing providers' expense ratio up to 1967 levels. The CTOC then sued the Board, saying it was unfair that there were two landlords on the board since they stood to benefit financially from any rent increases approved. The CTOC also organized a rent strike in which over 700 tenants would refuse to pay the increase approved by the Board to account for inflation.

"I can't accept that landlords' point of view that we as tenants have to carry the whole thing," one striking tenant said.

=== Property-owner protest ===
In July 1991, the Small Property Owners Association staged a sit-in protest in the Cambridge City Hall, calling for an end to rent control and for Mayor Alice Wolf to declare a "property rights day."

=== Response to demographic findings ===
A 1992 study by "a widely respected nonpartisan housing analyst” found that half of rent-controlled tenants were young professionals; when students were excluded, the proportion rose to 64%. Harvard University alone had 1,700 rent-controlled units associated with graduate students and university officials. In all, 2,650 units housed students, including 1,503 occupied by graduate students.

A proposal for the City Council to hold a hearing on the 1992 report was defeated, 6–3, because councilors feared that the report would be used in a lawsuit against the city. In May 1993, the council also voted not to invite the report’s author to testify.

=== Rejected offer of mediation ===
By 1993, the rent control debate was old, well worn, and as divisive as ever in Cambridge.

When a mediator was suggested to help both sides find common ground and eliminate the perpetual battle, tenant advocates opposed the suggestion and called it "just another form of attack" upon rent control. They said there were no major problems with the rent control system as it currently existed and thus no need to bring in a mediator. They also said they did not think the Small Property Owners Association was interested in improving the rent control system.

Tenant activists also opposed an offer made by recently retired Quincy District Court Judge Albert Kramer, a nationally recognized arbiter, who volunteered to serve as mediator because the offer was made through the office of Councilor William Walsh, a rent control opponent. The city council rejected a proposal to hire any mediator, 5-4, on May 3, 1993.

While the city council debated the idea, Cambridge Clergy for Affordable Housing began hosting their own sessions with tenants, housing providers, and mediators in small groups. Tenant activists called the clergy group biased towards the housing providers since, historically, the churches "contended that the city's poorsest and neediest residents are persistently left out when it comes to building affordable housing and leasing rent-controlled apartments."

=== City-wide hearing ===
Instead, it was decided to hold a city-wide hearing on rent control, but even just putting together an agenda, a date, or even an agreement on who should help with the planning proved to be controversial. At the hearing, SPOA proposed deregulating about 2/3 of the units currently under rent control while dedicating the remaining third to low income, elderly, or handicapped tenants. They idea, they said, was to set aside one unit for a tenant that needed it for every two that were taken off the rent control rolls.

The Cambridge Tenants Union proposed that the city create a revolving loan fund to help landlords make repairs to their properties when income from rent was not sufficient. They also proposed a "no frills" renovation standard so that only essential repairs, and not upgrades, would be made to units.

When Walsh called for a second hearing in the fall, but was denied, he used procedural maneauvers to put all of the Council's work on hold. He said after the second meeting in which he held up city business that he would continue to do so until landlords were granted relief from rent control.

== Market distortions ==
Comparison of rents
| Date | Rent-controlled rents | Market rents | Notes |
|---|---|---|---|
| 1985 | $275 | $357-$440 | |
| 1987 | $383 | $622 | |
| 1989 | More than 1,000 apartments were under $200. | A single room with no kitchen or bathroom rented for $433. | |
| 1990 | | 67% more than rent-controlled units | (Note: Rents in rent-controlled apartments in Cambridge were about 1/3 the rents in similar communities.) |
| 1994 | Average was $283. | Average was $891. | |

Economists have come to a "rare consensus" on the issue of rent control: it reduces the supply of rental housing, the existing housing stock deteriorates, and a community's property tax base is eroded. There are also secondary problems, including administrative costs, unemployment due to tenant inmobility, increased energy consumption, and discrimination against tenants.

According to Commonwealth Magazine, the history of rent control in Massachusetts and around the nation "paints a consistent picture of market distortions and unintended, often inequitable, consequences." Robert Kuttner, the liberal columnist, said that rent control "creates a two-tier housing market where a controlled building contains outlandish bargains while an uncontrolled building across the street commands astronomical 'market' rents."

Cambridge’s rental market was divided between rent-controlled units, whose rents could be increased only with the approval of the Rent Control Board, and uncontrolled units rented at market rates. Controlled rents were generally substantially lower, making those apartments highly sought after.

According to the executive editor of Banker and Tradesman, "because of the Cambridge rent control law, [selling a home] will be more complicated, time consuming, and probably more expensive than if you pursued the same strategy in almost any other community in the state."

=== Lack of apartments ===
In 1986, Cambridge had an official apartment vacancy rate of 3.3%, but officials believed the actual rate was much lower. The lack of available housing caused people to offer cash rewards for leads that led to finding a rent-controlled apartment. Posters covered bulletin boards and telephone poles across the city. One woman offered a reward of $650 for help in finding a rent-controlled apartment under $500 because she did not want to pay the $800 market rate rent.

By 1990, there was a vacancy rate of 6.13%, more than double the rate in 1960, while the average number of tenants per apartment fell from 2.71 persons to 1.95. Persons per unit was also the lowest among surrounding communities, suggesting that most units were not being occupied by families.

Rents in neighboring Somerville were double rents in Cambridge for comparable units, and large rent-controlled units paid half the rent of smaller, non-rent-controlled units with similar amenities and locations. Despite this, the city was still officially in a "housing emergency" that allowed for the continuation of rent control.

Outside the Harvard Housing Office, a vandal used day-glo paint to write "HELL is looking for an apartment in Cambridge. HEAVEN is finding one under rent control."

=== 1992 slump ===
Rents peaked in 1987 but fell as much as 33% five years later and the housing market was in a pronounced slump by 1992. Because landlords were allowed to temporarily increase rents to pay for repairs through controlled rents, but there was no guarantee on a return for housing providers with market rate units, there were cases where tenants in rent-controlled units were paying more in rent than those in market rate units. However, most rent-controlled units were still rented out well below what market rate units fetched.

Tenants in rent-controlled apartments paid, on average, $386 a month, or 53% of the rents tenants in non-rent-controlled apartments did in 1992. The following year, rents in Cambridge were more than 20% below the median rents in neighboring communities and rent-controlled units were let out at lower rates than 80% of the adjacent area market.

=== Worsened climate change ===
Landlords were not allowed to charge tenants the actual cost of the heating and cooling bills. In one building in Cambridge, the rent control board set an allowance in 1979 of 1,038 gallons of heating oil a year. By 1983, when the rent control board allowed an increase in rent to account for more oil, tenants were burning 4,730 gallons a year. In that four-year span, an extra 12,000 gallons of oil were burned and 122 tons of carbon dioxide were emitted into the atmosphere.

A study in the International Journal of Housing Policy found that rent control can make it harder to reduce carbon emissions from buildings as many energy-saving upgrades, such as better insulation, new windows, or more efficient heating systems, pose a significant upfront expense. Landlords are usually responsible for paying for these improvements, but tenants often receive much of the benefit through lower energy bills. When rent control limits a landlord's ability to raise rents and recover the cost of these upgrades, landlords may be less willing to invest in them. As a result, older buildings may use more energy and produce more greenhouse gas emissions.

Because tenants become "lockled-in" and are less likely to move lest they lose their below market rents, they often have longer commutes when they take new jobs. This leads to more time in the car and more gasoline emissions.

== Effects on housing stock ==
By 1975, the Greater Boston Real Estate Board said the industry was "extremely sick" and blamed the problem on real estate taxes and rent control. In Cambridge, construction of new housing "was nonexistent" during the rent control era.

=== Repairs and upkeep ===
Landlords could not increase rent without permission, even for basic repairs and upkeep, and instead had to submit detailed requests and proposals to the Rent Control Board to "prove" that the work had been done with the cheapest possible materials. Housing providers would have to pay for repairs or to replace broken appliances and then submit receipts to the rent control boards, who were under no obligation to approve increases to recover the costs.

It could take between six months and two years of adversarial hearings before the Rent Control Board for a decision to be made. If an increase in rent was approved, it could take six weeks to six months before the increase was passed on to the tenant, and it would be temporary. Rents went back down after the cost of the capital improvements were recovered by the landlord.

Because of delays in processing applications, inflation ate away at the amount landlords could ultimately collect in rent increases for capital improvements. Economist Herman B. Leonard of Harvard Business School found that landlords received between 70% and 75% of what the Rent Control Board deemed to be "fair." This, he said, was a "dramatic squeeze" on operating budgets, and led to less upkeep, lower quality, and faster deterioration of rent-controlled properties.

The chairman of the Small Property Owners Association said that "it's basic economics" that "buildings that are cash-starved will gradually deteriorate" as property owners can't afford to replace heating or electrical systems or roofs and windows when they reach the end of their natural lives. Banks were hesitant to lend to owners of buildings that were rent-controlled, making it even more difficult for owners to make repairs. The value of the properties was also diminished, lowering the borrowing power of owners of rent-controlled buildings.

==== Disputes over repair-related rent increases ====
Tenant advocates said that granting any rent increases for repairs, even temporary ones, undermined the idea of rent control itself. Dozens of tenants "stormed a City Council meeting" in Cambridge in 1992, protesting the fact that the rent control board allowed housing providers to increase rents to pay for repairs and upgrades.

When one housing provider spent over $200,000 in capital improvements on his property, the Cambridge Rent Control Board refused to allow him to raise rents to cover the expenses. Not all of the repairs were required, the Board said, because new electrical and water service were not mandated by building or safety codes. The owner sued, and a Superior Court justice ruled that the Board was imposing criteria not found in the regulations; she ruled in favor of the housing provider.

=== Urban blight ===
The difficulty of recovering costs discouraged the development of new buildings, and basic upkeep of existing buildings went undone. Many tenants with the lowest rents lived in buildings with "leaky roofs, falling gutters, makeshift and unsanitary bathrooms and no central heating." When properties that were under rent control fell into disrepair, they negatively impacted the property values of the buildings around them.

In a 1975 study of the effects of rent control in Massachusetts, George Sternlieb, the founder of the Rutgers University Center for Urban Policy Research, said that the loss of rental income would lead to a loss of "much of [the state's] housing investment." This was especially true of communities like Boston and Cambridge, which had older housing stock that would become a "wasted asset."

In 1988, the City of Cambridge estimated that it would cost between $40,000 and $60,000 to renovate most rent-controlled apartments. The city purposely did not inspect some run down apartments because they did not meet safety codes. The owners could not afford to fix them and, if the city made a finding that it was uninhabitable, the tenants would be displaced.

=== Arson and demolition ===
Rent control created an economic incentive for property owners to demolish rent-controlled buildings as new construction was exempt from rent control. Cambridge, like Boston, saw a number of "forced demolitions" through suspicious fires. When new buildings were constructed where rent-controlled buildings previously stood, they were full of condos.

After the owner of a pair of two-family houses was denied a permit to remove the units from rent control, they were abandoned and fell into disrepair. Neighbors complained for years that they were a fire, health, and safety hazard and eventually the city ordered them to be demolished. The Rent Control Board also charged the owner with the crime of leaving a rent-controlled unit vacant. Because the units were on the rent control rolls, whoever purchased the land would be required to build new rent control units on the land.

=== Municipal response ===
==== Loan fund ====
The City of Cambridge, recognizing that banks would not loan to owners of rent-controlled buildings, interceded with local banks to set up a loan fund at 11.5% interest. The chairman of the Small Property Owners Association opined that the need for a special fund was confirmation from the City that "our rents are too low to give us any cash reserve to handle" repairs and renovations to their properties.

==== Community Development Department ====
The City of Cambridge's Community Development Department ran a program where it bought derelict, financially unstable rental builidngs and renovated them using a mixture of city and state funds. Tenants then bought their units and the City ran the building as a limited equity co-op. Private owners of rent-controlled buildings were not allowed to convert their apartments into condos and sell them to their tenants but, once the City took over these buildings, tenants were then allowed to purchase them.

According to the chairman of the Small Property Owners Association, a representative of the department told the organization that the reason the buildings were run down was that rent control made it financially unfeasible for their previous owners to maintain them. John Natale, the SPOA chairman, said it was "the ultimate insult" that the city created a set of regulations that made managing a rental property financially untenable and then "solved our problem" by taking the buildings over using tax dollars.

==== Surcharge for dilapidated buildings ====
In the spring of 1991, the city council, by an 8-1, added an additional tax was added to the rents of rent-controlled apartments to raise funds for the repairs of substandard units. Housing providers could take a loan from the fund to make repairs to deteriorating rent-controlled properties but they could not pass the full cost of the repairs on to the tenants.

Tenant activists opposed the surcharge, saying it was "absolutely unfair to [impose a surcharge] on tenants alone for anything." Housing providers also opposed it as they would be responsible for collecting it from tenants and paying it to the city, but it was unclear what would happen if a tenant refused to pay.

It was repealed that summer after pressure from tenant groups caused city councilors to withdraw their support.

== Financial effects ==
=== Disparity between rents and operating costs ===
During the first three years of rent control, 1970 to 1973, the rents in rent-controlled apartments rose 6.7%. The cost to maintain and operate apartments during that period was more than double that. In 1973, fewer than 12% of tenants in rent-controlled apartments saw their rent go up. Costs for landlords rose 8% that year.

From 1970 to 1978, taxes rose 71%. In 1990, taxes on some homeowners doubled. One owner, who lived in his building, had expenses that were five times the amount of rent he was able to collect.

=== Wealth redistribution ===
Between $18 million and $36 million was redistributed every year from landlords to tenants, with the average tenant receiving an annual benefit of between $1,000 and $2,000, in 1985. In 1990, that figure exceeded $50 million.

=== Tax burden shift ===
Through rent control, those who owned their own homes subsidized the rents of those who occupied rent-controlled apartments in the form of higher taxes.

For every dollar in rent that tenants saved, municipalities lost 30 cents in tax revenue. If a rent-controlled apartment was rented for $25 a month less than the market rate, the city lost $90 a year in revenue.

Cambridge buildings that were under rent control paid 1/3 of the taxes that non-rent-controlled buildings did. In one case, a rent-controlled building that was twice the size of a non-rent-controlled building across the street paid less than 1/7 the taxes.

In 1985, it was estimated that homeowners paid an additional $5 million to $10 million a year to subsidize the rents of those in rent-controlled apartments through higher taxes. This was 10%-20% of Cambridge's tax base. In 1990, the cost to Cambridge was $12 million, with the average non-rent-controlled property owner paying an additional $600 in taxes to subsidize rent-controlled units. That year, Cambridge residents paid the 12th highest taxes out of 351 cities and towns in Massachusetts.

When rent control was instituted in 1970, buildings with four or more units paid 50% of all of the property tax revenue in Cambridge. By 1993, this was reduced to less than 10%.

== Cambridge's role in the statewide repeal ==
Rent control was repealed in 1994 via ballot initiative with an effective date of January 1, 1995. Massachusetts became the 27th state to ban rent control.

Only Cambridge, Brookline, and Boston maintained active rent control systems, each under separate enabling acts, while Amherst had a rent review system, and Lowell, Waltham, and Somerville had enabling legislation authorizing rent control but no program in effect. Only Cambridge had a full system in place even though "by virtually all commonly accepted measures... [Cambridge had] the very opposite of a housing emergency" at the time.

After rent control was repealed, average rents rose 21 percent across all units in municipalities that had a rent control program before repeal.

=== Small Property Owners Association ===
The repeal effort was led by small Cambridge landlords who felt they were being unfairly treated by the local rent control board. In this way, they used a state ballot question to achieve a primarily local policy change and end what "had long been an ugly, simmering local dispute."

The Small Property Owners Association had its start when David P. Sullivan purchased a six-unit building from his father; all units were rent-controlled. The rent control law allowed landlords to recover possession of a rent-controlled unit if they wanted it for themselves or a family member, and Sullivan wanted to rent it to his daughter, who was getting married. The Rent Control Board denied his petition, however, and it took two years and "substantial concessions" to the tenant in order to get them to leave. The episode aggrieved Sullivan and his family, who believed the Rent Control Board was acting outside the law and was hostile to landlords, and so he helped to found the Small Property Owners Association (SPOA).

Likewise, Denise Jillson purchased a four-family home with her husband. She wanted to use the same provision of the law that allowed owners to occupy their own properties, but was subject to a long delay by the Rent Control Board. While Jillson and her family were living with other relatives, the tenant in the unit she wished to inhabit was subletting rooms in the apartment. This led to Jillson becoming a co-chair of the SPOA and the leader of the statewide ballot campaign.

The other co-chair of the SPOA was Salim Kabawat. By 1993 the organization had more than 1,400 members, many of whom were elderly and immigrants. The SPOA frequently fielded phone calls from distraught property owners who were upset with the way their tenants or the Rent Control Board was treating them.

=== Legislative and legal attempts ===
After the 1991 Cambridge city council elections, the SPOA, seeing a pro-rent control majority for the next two years who were not open to compromise, launched a fundraising campaign to challenge rent control in the courts. Their case focused on five points:

- It had been over 20 years since a housing emergency was declared, and the emergency was now over.
- Rent control failed to provide housing to the poor and the elderly, which was its stated purpose.
- Housing providers were not receiving a fair net operating income.
- The prohibition of condo conversions was illegal.
- Rent control constituted a taking of private property without just compensation.

After losing the case and their appeal, the US Supreme Court declined to hear the case, partly on a technicality. The SPOA, which had nearly 1,000 members by this point, launched another lawsuit in 1992. A Superior Court judge threw out 13 of the 16 claims in March 1993. The judge said many of the issues raised in their lawsuit would be better address in the Statehouse or in City Hall.

With the help of Rep. Philip Travis, the SPOA filed four pieces of legislation in 1993 that would erode rent control in Cambridge. The first would exempt any building with six units or fewer from rent control, the second changed the way rent-controlled properties were assessed, the third would allow rent-controlled units to remain vacant for more than four months, and the last would require the any community that wanted to retain rent control to re-certify that a housing emergency still existed 20+ years after it was used to justify the establishment of rent control.

=== Legal background ===
Jon R. Maddox, a Cambridge lawyer, became involved with the Small Property Owners Association in 1993 after learning that his condominium was subject to Cambridge's restrictions on owner occupancy of certain condominium-converted units. Maddox was in danger of being prosecuted for living in a condominium he owned.

The legal basis for the 1994 initiative petition rested on the argument that rent control was a matter of state policy rather than a purely local issue. Maddox's initial draft would have prohibited rent control outright, but the Attorney General's office raised concerns that it might be excluded from the initiative process because its practical operation would be limited to particular municipalities.

Maddox revised the petition to authorize all Massachusetts cities and towns to adopt a limited form of rent control, which effectively abolished it, while prohibiting any other form of rent control. Under the proposal, a community could adopt rent control but would have to pay housing providers, who would have to opt in to the program, for lost rent. Tenant activists said the voluntary section, which would apply to every community in the Commonwealth, was a "sham." No municipality would adopt it, they said. The Attorney General's office concluded that the revised petition was not restricted to particular localities because it gave every municipality some legal authority it did not previously have.

Cambridge tenants formed the Campaign for Affordable Housing and Tenant Protection to oppose the effort. The Campaign argued that because rent control was primarily a local issue, and that the elected city council in Cambridge supported rent control, that it was "antidemocratic" to try and adopt a state law banning it; it was a special state law that granted Cambridge the authority to institute rent control.

=== Court challenges ===
After the first round of signatures was filed, the Secretary of the Commonwealth determined that the petition had 69,926 allowable signatures, 360 fewer than the 70,286 required to advance the initiative. Jillson and the other original petition signers challenged the determination in Massachusetts Superior Court, arguing that enough signatures had been wrongly rejected to overcome the shortfall. Rent control supporters from Cambridge, Boston, and Brookline intervened in the case in opposition to the petition proponents. The proponents reviewed uncertified signatures and compared them with voter-registration lists, telephone books, and city directories.

During the litigation, both sides also challenged signatures that had been certified or rejected by local officials. In one episode, opponents challenged several Quincy signatures as forgeries and had them disqualified. A tenant activist asked the Attorney General to seek a criminal investigation, but received no response.

The petition proponents then submitted an affidavit from a handwriting expert stating that they were forged by one of the people opposing the petition in court. On April 22, 1994, after weeks of testimony, Judge Martha B. Sosman ruled that the petition proponents had established enough additional signatures to exceed the requirement by 34 signatures.

Separately, the City of Cambridge spent $110,000 an outside law firm to try and kill the measure. They argued that rent control was a home rule matter and not an appropriate subject for a public referendum. Tenant activists were excited the city filed the lawsuit, but the Massachusetts Homeowners Association called it a waste of taxpayer dollars.

In July, a unanimous Supreme Judicial Court of Massachusetts ruled that "although it may appear to be a purely local issue, it is not," and thus the question could appear on the ballot. Justice Ruth Abrams, who long occupied a rent-controlled apartment, recused herself from the case.

Both sides had lawsuits against the Secretary of the Commonwealth.

=== Response to the proposed repeal ===
During the debate on the statewide prohibition of rent control, city councilor Katherine Triantafillou, a rent control supporter, offered a resolution on post-election options. She said that said there were "between 2,000 and 3,000 low-income families" out of the roughly 14,000 families in rent-controlled apartments who would lost rent control protections if the ballot question passed.

The annual budget for the Rent Control Board was $1.4 million in 1994 and the city lost $12 million in lost property taxes due to depressed property values. The city could have given each of the low-income tenants in rent controlled apartments $300 a month for a total cost of $7.2 million, or less than half of what rent control cost.

The Rent Control Board also began adjusting their procedures in response to the proposed repeal, speeding up the amount of time it took to consider rent adjustments and more aggressive case management. He Terrence Morris, the executive director, denied that the changes were designed to pacify voters on the eve of the election but admitted the possibility of repeal was the catalyst for them.

=== Election results ===
Election results
| Jurisdiction | Yes | No |
|---|---|---|
| Statewide | 1,034,594 | 980,723 |
| Cambridge | 13,262 | 18,556 |

At the November 8, 1994, state election, voters approved Question 9, abolishing rent control. The measure received 1,034,594 votes in favor and 980,723 votes against, or about 51 percent to 49 percent. Officials in Boston and Brookline blamed Cambridge for failing to modify its extreme version of rent control and upsetting voters enough to ban it statewide. Cambridge City Councilor Sheila Russell, who supported rent control, agreed. "If we had only listened to [the small landlords] and helped them out in the last five years, they would never have gone to this extreme," she said.

Although the initiative passed statewide, it lost in Cambridge, where voters rejected it by 58 percent to 42 percent.

== Impact of the repeal ==
Researchers have described the repeal of rent control in Cambridge as a natural experiment that significantly affected property values, residential investment, and neighborhood development throughout the city. Close to 40% of all Cambridge properties were under rent control when it was repealed.

=== Housing development ===
Residential investment rose sharply following decontrol. Annual permitted residential investment more than doubled relative to the years immediately preceding the repeal, reflecting substantial increases in renovations, building upgrades, and new construction.

Within four years of repealing the law, Cambridge, where "the city's form of rent control was unusually strict," saw new housing and construction increase substantially, and the tax revenue from construction permits tripled.

=== Tenants ===
After the repeal, the Massachusetts General Court passed a law protecting low-income tenants in rent control apartments from being evicted. Only 9.4% of tenants in rent-controlled apartments in Cambridge applied for and received protection for up to two years.

One review states that one possible explanation for the low number is the combination of a strict income limit with inaction by tenants whose rents did not immediately rise in the aftermath of repeal. However, "the dramatically low percentage of formerly controlled units whose tenants established protected status gives credence to the assertion of opponents of rent control that it had become an entitlement program for middle- and upper-income tenants."

After the repeal, median rents rose 40 percent in Cambridge for tenants who stayed in formerly controlled units or moved to other never-controlled units. Additionally, "exit rates from formerly controlled units spiked... and given the substantial accompanying increases in rents, it is likely that the new cohorts of renters were significantly more affluent than the tenants they replaced."

=== Property values ===
Property values in Cambridge increased by about $7.8 billion in the decade following the repeal. Roughly a quarter of this increase, approximately $2 billion ($3 billion in 2024 dollars), was attributable to the repeal of rent control.

The majority of the increase in housing values attributable to decontrol came from spillover effects on neighboring properties rather than direct gains to formerly controlled units. Never-controlled properties captured more than half of the total capitalized gains associated with the repeal, and properties in neighborhoods with higher concentrations of rent-controlled housing experienced particularly large gains.

== Works cited ==
- Bloom, Robert M. (1 January 1974). "Chapter 19: Rent Control". Annual Survey of Massachusetts Law. 1974 (1).
- Moncreiff, Robert P. (23 September 1996). "The Repeal of Rent Control in Cambridge". New England Journal of Public Policy. 12 (1).
