= Larry Tye =

American writer

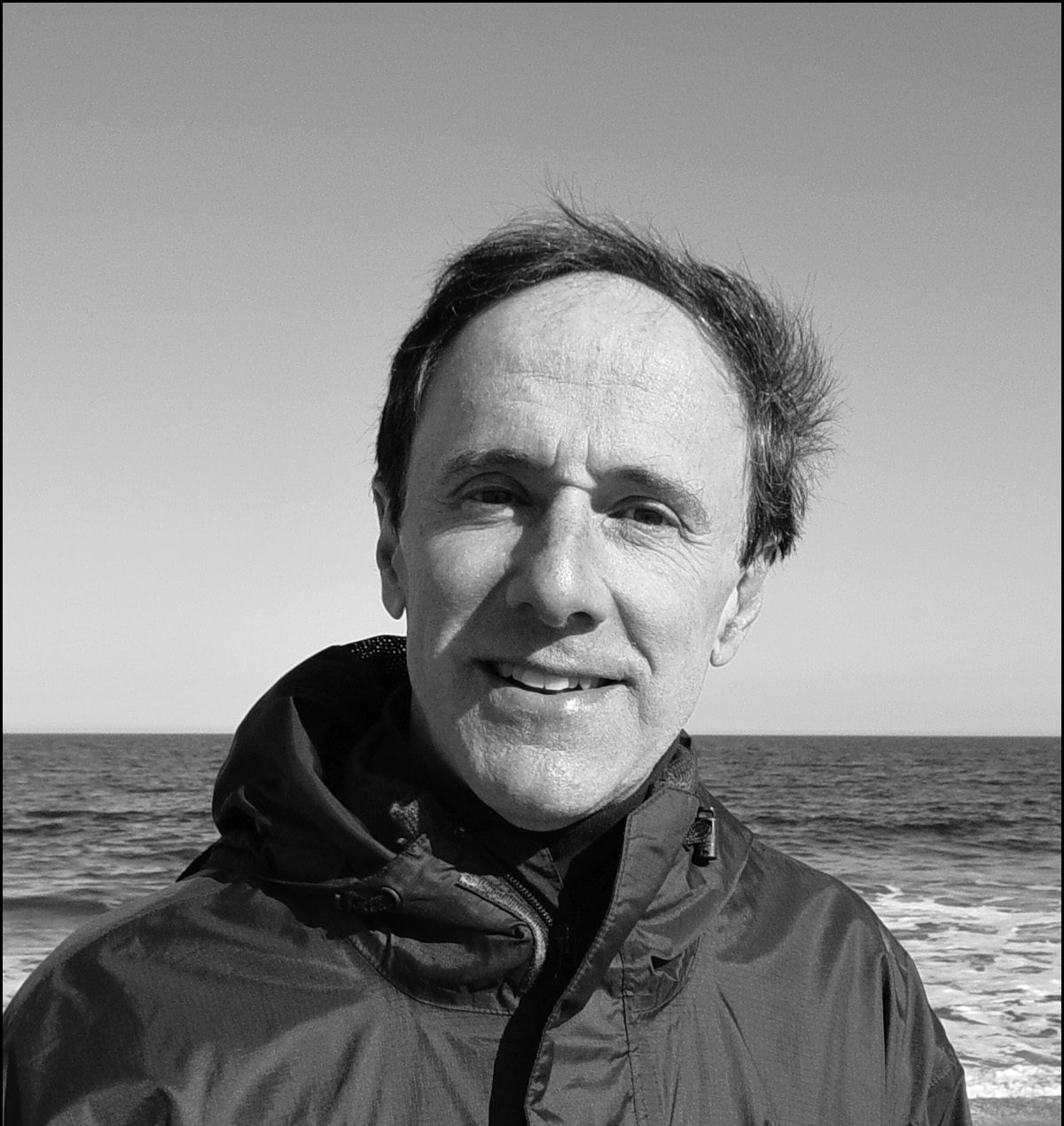
Larry Tye in 2009.

Larry Tye is an American journalist and non-fiction author, known for his biographies of notable Americans including Edward Bernays (1999), Satchel Paige (2009), Robert F. Kennedy (2016) and Joseph McCarthy (2020).

== Life ==
Larry Tye grew up in Boston, born to a Jewish family, as related in his book, Home Lands: Portrait of the New Jewish Diaspora.

Tye graduated from Brown University.

When selling his home in Cambridge, Tye said the city's rent control law "created nightmares for many homeowners like me." He produced an application that "included documents dating back 14 years" that he presented before the Rent Control Board to prove that it was owner-occupied and not a rental.

== Career ==
From 1986 to 2001, Tye was a reporter for The Boston Globe, where his primary beat was medicine. He also served as the Globe's environmental reporter, roving national writer, investigative reporter and sports writer. Before that, he was the environmental reporter for The Courier-Journal in Louisville, Kentucky, and covered government and business for The Anniston Star in Anniston, Alabama.

Tye was a Nieman Fellow at Harvard University in 1993–1994 and has won major newspaper awards including the Livingston Award for Young Journalists and the Edward J. Meeman Award for Environmental Journalism.

Two of Tye's books, one on the Pullman porters and another on electroconvulsive therapy, have been adapted into documentary films. In 2017, plans were announced for Sony and Hulu to make his biography of Robert F. Kennedy into a limited TV series, with Chris Pine in talks to play Kennedy.

Tye won a Goldsmith Research Prize from the Harvard Kennedy School, an Alicia Patterson Fellowship, a Rockefeller Foundation Bellagio Residency, and research grants from the Newberry Library, the Gilder Lehrman Institute of American History, and the Eisenhower and Truman libraries. His books have won awards including the National Alliance on Mental Illness's highest honor for Shock co-authored with Kitty Dukakis. Tye's biography of Satchel Paige was named a New York Times Notable Book, and won two prizes—the Casey Award and Seymour Medal—as the best baseball book of 2009.

The Wall Street Journal wrote that Tye’s book, Demagogue: The Life and Long Shadow of Senator Joe McCarthy, was “the fullest account yet” of McCarthy and “the rigor of his research ensures he goes far beyond the caricature to give us a portrait of nuance and depth.” NPR reported that the book also, “draws a parallel between McCarthy's tactics and President Trump's divisive rhetoric.”

In 2024, Tye released The Jazzmen: How Duke Ellington, Louis Armstrong, and Count Basie Transformed America.

Additionally, Tye is director of the Boston-based Health Coverage Fellowship, which each year trains 10 American medical journalists to better cover issues in this field.

He has taught journalism at Boston University, Northeastern University and Tufts University.

== Books ==
- The Father of Spin: Edward L. Bernays and the Birth of Public Relations. New York: Crown Publishing Group (1998). ISBN 978-0517704356.
- Homelands: Portraits of the New Jewish Diaspora. New York: Henry Holt and Company (2001). ISBN 978-0805065909.
- Rising From the Rails: Pullman Porters and the Making of the Black Middle Class. New York: Henry Holt and Company (2004). ISBN 978-0805070750.
- Shock: The Healing Power of Electroconvulsive Therapy, co-written by Kitty Dukakis. Avery Publishing (2007). ISBN 978-1583332832.
- Satchel: The Life and Times of an American Legend. New York: Random House (2009). ISBN 978-1400066513.
- Superman: The High-Flying History of America's Most Enduring Hero. New York: Random House (2012). ISBN 978-1400068661.
- Bobby Kennedy: The Making of a Liberal Icon. New York: Random House (2016). ISBN 978-0812993349.
- Demagogue: The Life and Long Shadow of Senator Joe McCarthy. New York: Houghton Mifflin (2020). ISBN 978-1328959720.
- The Jazzmen: How Duke Ellington, Louis Armstrong, and Count Basie Transformed America. HarperCollins (2024). ISBN 978-0-358-38043-6.

== Honors and awards ==
- 2009 Casey Award for Satchel: The Life and Times of an American Legend
- 2010 Seymour Medal for Satchel: The Life and Times of an American Legend
