= William Aramony =

Former CEO of United Way of America

- Born: William J. Aramony; July 27, 1927; Jewett City, Connecticut, US
- Died: November 11, 2011 (aged 84); Alexandria, Virginia, US
- Education: Boston College Graduate School of Social Work
- Occupation: CEO
- Employer: United Way of America
- Known for: building UWA into the preeminent fund-raising charity in the US; fraud
- Term: 1972 – 1992

William J. Aramony (July 27, 1927 – November 11, 2011) was CEO of United Way of America for more than twenty years. He helped build United Way into the largest charitable organization in the United States. He retired in 1992 amid a scandal that led to criminal charges of fraud and financial mismanagement, for which he was subsequently convicted in 1995 and sentenced to prison.

== Early years ==
Aramony was born in Jewett City, Connecticut. His parents, Russell and Nazley Farrah Aramony, emigrated to the United States from Lebanon, and he was the youngest of their five children. He grew up in Worcester, Massachusetts, graduated from Clark University in 1949 and matriculated at the Boston College Graduate School of Social Work, where in 1951 he earned a master's degree. Aramony married the former Bebe Ann Nojeim, and the union produced three children, William, Susan and Robert. Son Robert was at one time president of Sales Service/America Inc., a for-profit subsidiary of UWA.

Aramony served in the Medical Service Corps of the United States Army, treating soldiers returning from the Korean War with posttraumatic stress disorder. He was assigned to a Texas military hospital from 1951 to 1953 as a lieutenant.

== United Way career ==
Aramony began in 1954 as a staff planner for the South Bend, Indiana, Community Chest. Four years later, he was hired as a local executive in Columbia, South Carolina, then Miami, Florida where he was known as a superb fund raiser and enthusiastic promoter for the charities he represented.

He was hired as CEO of the national governing body, the United Community Funds and Council of America (UCFCA) in 1970. He began an organizational makeover and the group was renamed, United Way of America (UWA), and moved from New York City to Alexandria, Virginia in 1971. A common stated purpose and standard name (United Way of ...) was established for local affiliates.

Next, he formed a partnership with the National Football League in 1973, whereby "players and coaches made public service announcements about their involvement with United Way chapters" which were broadcast during NFL games at no charge. "[T]hese associations brought widespread attention" to the United Way and in 1975, helped push donations above $1 billion for the first time.

Aramony helped develop a core strategy, which emphasizes an annual community-wide campaign in the Fall. United Way provides assistance to employers, who provide a payroll deduction option to encourage workers to contribute to United Way. Agencies that receive United Way funding agree not to solicit donations during the UW campaign.

Over his career, he helped develop numerous United Way leaders. Some of these new leaders—Ralph Dickerson Jr., at United Way of New York City, and Oral Suer and Norman O. Taylor at United Way of the National Capital Area—were later involved in expense report scandals.

Aramony was awarded the Silver Buffalo Award in 1988 by the National council of the Boy Scouts of America. It is presented for noteworthy and extraordinary service to youth on a national basis. During his tenure, United Way receipts rose from $787 million in 1970 to more than $3.1 billion in 1990 ($1.04 billion in 1970 dollars).

== Scandal begins ==
Aramony and his wife, Bebe were separated in 1988. In 1990, there were UWA office rumors about Aramony's liaisons with a teenage girlfriend on vacations in Paris, London and Cairo. An anonymous note on UWA letterhead was sent in late 1990 to UWA's chairman, Edward A. Brennan, who was the chairman of Sears, Roebuck & Company. The letter alleged that the charity was being looted by its president, who was romancing a young woman.

When Aramony was questioned about the allegations, he denied any wrongdoing. His divorce became final in 1991. Late that year, a source at the national office revealed that Aramony flew first class, sometimes on the Concorde, used chauffeur-driven town cars and alleged that he had lavished expensive gifts on friends. After receiving multiple requests for information from the media, the United Way of America's board of governors hired outside investigators in December 1991. The auditors were instructed to review the books and examine accounting procedures within the agency. According to The Washington Post, their investigation "found sloppy record-keeping, inattention to detail, and accounting problems," but no direct "evidence that Aramony had enriched himself". In fact, all of Aramony's travel expenses were supposed to be reviewed before approval by the United Way's board of directors, whose chairman was Robert E. Allen, then the CEO of AT&T. The auditor's biggest criticism was that documentation was lacking to distinguish business expenditures from personal charges. The outrage from local United Way organizations across the country was overwhelming. Scores of offices disaffiliated themselves and/or discontinued their 1% "contribution" of dues to the national office.

During a teleconference on February 27, 1992, Aramony announced his retirement with full pension benefits as soon as a successor was chosen. Until then, he would continue to receive his $390,000 salary and $73,000 in other compensation. When Jay R. Smith, publisher of The Atlanta Journal-Constitution and an active volunteer at United Way of Atlanta asked Aramony if he felt that they were not owed an apology, Aramony said:

Well, Jay, you absolutely are. I do apologize for any problems that my lack of sensitivity to perceptions has caused this movement. I do it happily and gladly to you and everyone else. I would never do anything at all that hurt local United Ways, the mission or the people we serve.

The following day, after an avalanche of calls from local chapters demanding his ousting, senior vice president Alan S. Cooper was named acting president.

== Indictment ==
The Washington Post and Regardie's magazine each wrote stories about Aramony, and the FBI, Internal Revenue Service, and United States Postal Service investigated. Later that year, Aramony was charged, along with CFO Thomas J. Merlo and Partnership Umbrella President Stephen J. Paulachak, in a 53-count Federal indictment charging that they had defrauded their organization of $1.2 million.

=== Other issues ===
A secondary issue that was not litigated was the alleged sexual harassment committed by William Aramony. He was accused of pressuring numerous office workers to have sex with him, though no such accusations were ever formally filed. According to the indictment, he propositioned female employees and offered the women "financial benefits" if they had sex with him and transferred or suppressed the careers of "those who rebuffed him."

Rina Duncan, Aramony's former secretary, testified that she had had an affair with Aramony beginning shortly after she was hired in 1982 and lasting until 1985. During trial, the court admitted testimony from several UWA female employees who testified that they had sexual relationships with Aramony, and from two UWA employees who rejected Aramony's sexual advances in 1985.

== Villasor sisters and other affairs ==
When Lisa Villasor Thomas was 22, she met William Aramony on an airplane. He got her a job at UWA and their affair began in July 1986. They traveled together to San Francisco, New York City and other locations for business. Everything was fine until he "met someone he liked even more: her kid sister."

Lori Villasor graduated from high school in Macclenny, Florida, in 1986. She was unsure what to do with her life, so she accepted her older sister's invitation to move to Alexandria, Virginia, and share an apartment. Soon after meeting the 17-year-old Lori, the 59-year-old Aramony began pursuing her. Lisa Thomas, outraged, told Aramony that she "didn't want him contacting me or Lori at all".

Aramony arranged for a UWA subsidiary to purchase an expensive New York City condominium and furnished it lavishly with $459,000 Partnership Umbrella dollars. Aramony claimed that it was a better deal for UWA than the apartment that had been rented for almost 20 years. However, he also used it for his romantic trysts. Aramony was alleged to have siphoned thousands of charity dollars through Partnership Umbrella to spend on fancy meals, trips and gifts, to keep Villasor as his mistress.

Lori Villasor testified that she had received compensation of $27,500 for two consecutive years as a UWA employee for working on a real estate deal which actually required only "an hour or so" of her time. Aramony also flew Villasor and her younger sister LuAnn to Las Vegas as a graduation gift for LuAnn.

Rina Duncan, Aramony's assistant, stated that after Aramony began dating Villasor, "he would run up big bills for airplane flights and entertainment." Ms. Duncan admitted that she had altered Aramony's expense accounts for seven years by substituting the names of clients for Ms. Villasor's name and charging UWA for personal luxury items given to Ms. Villasor.

At one point, Villasor threatened to leave Aramony if Duncan continued to work for him. Time magazine notes that Aramony found a position "for Duncan at Partnership Umbrella, the U.W.A. spin-off company that he would use to fund his affair with Villasor."

According to court documents, Aramony was also seeing another UWA employee between 1987 and 1991. Aramony purchased half ownership of a race horse, Stylish Affair, in her name and was alleged to have spent $125,576.92 to purchase a Florida condominium for her use until her retirement in May 1991. He also allegedly used $10,000 of United Way funds to furnish the condominium.

== Prosecution ==
On April 3, 1995, after a three-week trial, Aramony was convicted in the U.S. District Court for the Eastern District of Virginia on 23 counts including conspiracy to defraud, mail fraud, wire fraud, transportation of fraudulently acquired property, engaging in monetary transactions in unlawful activity, filing false tax returns and aiding in the filing of false tax returns. Money laundering charges were dismissed. He was sentenced to 7 years in prison, fined $300,000, and served time at the Federal Prison Camp at Seymour Johnson Air Force Base, near Goldsboro, North Carolina, with BOP number 40569-083.

Upon appeal, the $300,000 fine was vacated by the United States Court of Appeals, Fourth Circuit based on Aramony's inability to pay. He was released from prison on September 28, 2001 after six years of incarceration and was on probation for three additional years.

Aramony consistently denied any wrongdoing. He appealed his convictions and sentences; nearly all of his appeals were denied. "Aramony's lawyer says his client's judgment was impaired because of brain atrophy" and noted "that Aramony had a cancer that led to surgical castration" while he was seeing Lori Villasor. Lori Villasor ended her affair with Aramony in 1992.

While still incarcerated in 1996, Aramony filed a $5 million lawsuit against UWA, claiming he was denied earnings and retirement benefits that were due him. UWA counter-sued and a United States district court issued a split decision which both parties appealed. The Second Circuit Court of Appeals reversed a portion of the lower court's decision: United Way of America owed Aramony $2.4 million in pension benefits, less UWF's $2.02 million award against Aramony. After subtracting the amount Aramony owed UWA from the New York state attorney general's judgement against him, applicable income tax withholdings and attorney's fees, Aramony received $7,871.

== Later life and death ==
Aramony married again in 2002 to Gail Manza. According to The New York Times, Aramony devoted a great deal of his time during the 2000s to an initiative for Middle East Jewish, Muslim and Christian communities to encourage fellowship, mediation services and visitor exchange.

He died in late 2011 at his son's Arlington, Virginia home. The cause of Aramony's death was bone cancer, which developed following prostate cancer in the early 1990s.

== Publications ==
- The United Way: The Next Hundred Years, ISBN 1-55611-039-1, Dutton Adult, April 1987
