= WZBC =

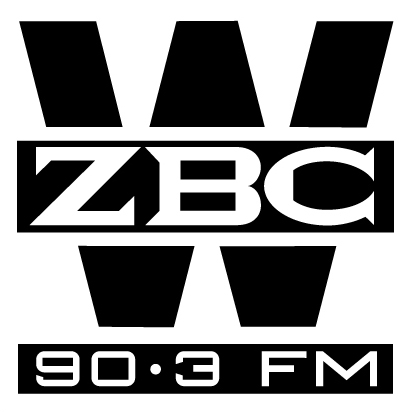
- Newton, Massachusetts; United States
- Broadcast area: Boston, Massachusetts
- Frequency: 90.3 MHz
- Branding: WZBC 90.3 FM

Programming
- Format: Alternative

Ownership
- Owner: Boston College; (Trustees of Boston College)

History
- First air date: April 1974
- Call sign meaning: Boston College

Technical information
- Licensing authority: FCC
- Facility ID: 68240
- Class: A
- ERP: 1,000 watts
- HAAT: 67 meters (220 ft)
- Transmitter coordinates: 42°20′5.3″N 71°10′29.1″W

Links
- Public license information: Public file; LMS
- Webcast: Listen live
- Website: www.wzbc.org

WZBC (90.3 FM) is a radio station broadcasting an alternative format. Licensed to Newton, Massachusetts, United States, the station serves Boston and its western suburbs. The station is owned by Boston College.

While the station is run solely by students, much of the on-air staff is made up of members of the surrounding Boston community. The station broadcasts alternative and indie rock during the day, and then branches out to more diverse styles in the early evening. At night, the station focuses on experimental music, which it calls No Commercial Potential. WZBC is located on the main campus of the college in Chestnut Hill, Massachusetts, with its transmitter at the corner of Beacon Street and Hammond Street, and its studio is located in McElroy Commons. WZBC also broadcasts sports for the Boston College Eagles, including basketball, football, hockey, baseball, and softball. The station also syndicates Democracy Now! at noon on weekdays.

== History ==
Founded as WVBC, "The Voice of Boston College", the radio station began in 1960 as a carrier-current AM station, broadcasting solely to the university community through the electrical wiring of on-campus buildings and dormitories. After operating in this capacity for 13 years, Boston College applied for and was granted a license to operate WZBC, a 17-watt station which aired a wide range of music, from folk to country to rock. With the advent of WZBC, the radio station expanded its listenership and began serving school's neighboring community.

In 1975, the station was granted a power increase, bringing the station's output to 1,000 watts, allowing for further expansion of its listenership. The first stereo broadcast was officially marked by a guest appearance by British radio DJ John Peel. Shortly after the switch, the station narrowed its rock format to the genre known as modern rock, playing new bands which were not played on commercial radio. At approximately the same time, WZBC also began broadcasting more experimental music under the moniker No Commercial Potential.

Since the early 2000s, WVBC has been available to stream online.

In 1990, WZBC was profiled in Rolling Stone magazine and was named one of the country's top 10 college radio stations that year.

When rock band Nirvana released its breakthrough album Nevermind on Tuesday, September 24, 1991, the group was in Boston that day. Band members Dave Grohl and Krist Novoselic stopped by WZBC and were interviewed on the air. Tracks from the new album were played and tickets were given away to listeners for a newly announced all-ages show that night at the since-closed Axis nightclub.

Although WZBC is best known for its music programming, a number of its former sports announcers have gone on to have successful professional careers in sportscasting.

== Notable alumni ==
Brian Carpenter, musician
Brian Coleman, Check the Technique author
Gerard Cosloy, record label empresario
Valerie Forgione, Mistle Thrush vocalist
Fred Giannelli, musician
Maura Johnston, writer, music critic, and Boston College journalism adjunct professor.
Jim McKay, writer, director, producer of film and TV
Jon Rish, sports announcer
R. T. Rybak, mayor of Minneapolis, 2002–2014
Herb Scannell, media mogul and businessman
Jon Sciambi, sports announcer
Dave Smalley, punk vocalist
Joe Tessitore, sports announcer
Bob Wischusen, sports announcer
Matt Leopold, professional sailor

== See also ==
- Campus radio
- List of college radio stations in the United States
