= Boston College =

Catholic university in Massachusetts, US

- Latin: Collegium Bostoniense
- Motto: Αἰὲν ἀριστεύειν (Greek)
- Motto in English: "Ever to Excel"
- Type: Private research university
- Established: March 31, 1863; 163 years ago
- Founder: John McElroy
- Accreditation: NECHE
- Religious affiliation: Catholic (Jesuit)
- Academic affiliations: AJCU; ACCU; NAICU
- Endowment: $4.24 billion (2025)
- President: John T. Butler
- Provost: David Quigley
- Faculty: 917 full-time, 601 part-time
- Students: 15,234 (fall 2024)
- Undergraduates: 9,654 (fall 2024)
- Postgraduates: 5,072 (fall 2024)
- Other students: 508 (fall 2024)
- Location: Chestnut Hill, Massachusetts, United States; 42°20′06″N 71°10′13″W
- Campus: Small City, 388 acres (157 ha) (total); Main Campus, 175 acres (71 ha); Messina College, 48 acres (19 ha); Newton Campus, 40 acres (16 ha); Brighton Campus, 65 acres (26 ha)
- Newspaper: The Heights
- Colors: Maroon and gold
- Nickname: Eagles
- Sporting affiliations: NCAA Division I FBS – ACC; Hockey East; NEISA; EISA; EAWRC
- Mascot: Baldwin the Eagle
- Website: bc.edu

Boston College (BC) is a private Catholic Jesuit research university in Chestnut Hill, Massachusetts, United States. Founded in 1863 by the Society of Jesus, a Catholic religious order, the university has more than 15,000 total students, making it the seventh largest Catholic university in the U.S. by enrollment.

Boston College was originally located in the South End of Boston before moving most of its campus to Chestnut Hill in 1907. Its main campus is a historic district and features some of the earliest examples of collegiate Gothic architecture in North America. The campus is 6 miles west of downtown Boston. It offers bachelor's degrees, master's degrees, and doctoral degrees through its nine colleges and schools. Boston College is classified as a "Research 1: Very High Research Spending and Doctorate Production" university by the Carnegie Classification.

Boston College athletic teams are the Eagles. Their colors are maroon and gold and their mascot is Baldwin the Eagle. The Eagles compete in NCAA Division I as members of the Atlantic Coast Conference in all sports offered by the ACC. The men's and women's ice hockey teams compete in Hockey East. Boston College's men's ice hockey team has won five national championships.

Alumni and affiliates of the university include governors, ambassadors, members of Congress, scholars, writers, medical researchers, Hollywood actors, and professional athletes. Boston College alumni include three Rhodes, 22 Truman, and 171 Fulbright scholars.

== History ==
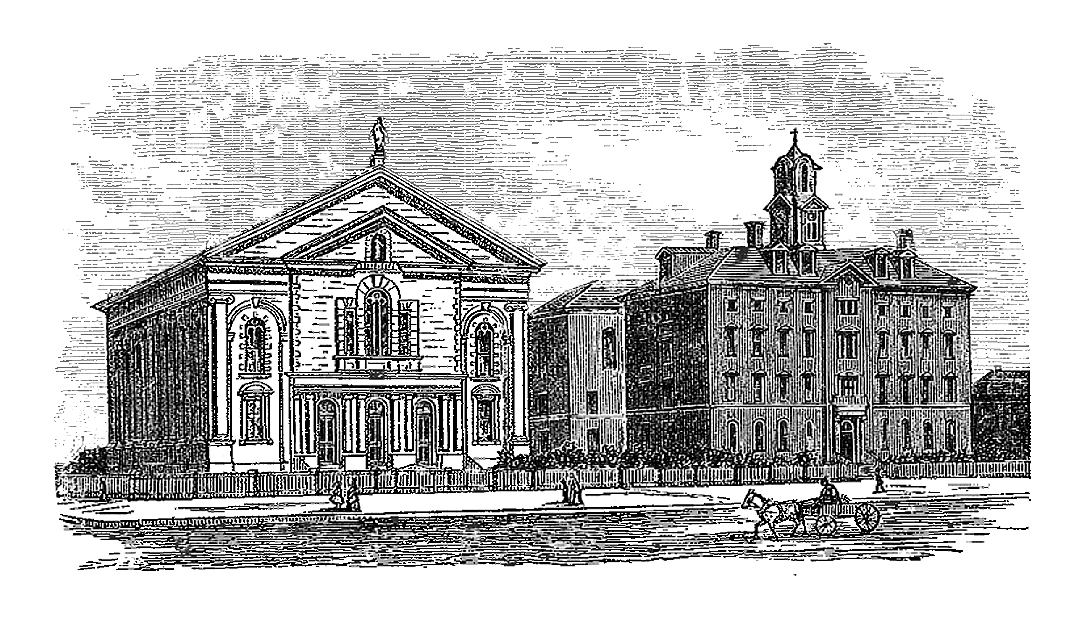
Early Boston College in Boston's South End

=== Early history ===
Boston College was founded through the efforts of the first Jesuit community in New England, which was established at St. Mary's Church in Boston in 1849. Jesuit priest John McElroy maintained the vision for what became Boston College, recognizing the need for an educational institution for the Irish Catholic immigrant population. With the approval of his Jesuit superiors, McElroy raised funds and purchased land for "The Boston College" on Harrison Avenue in the Hudson neighborhood of South End, Boston, Massachusetts, in 1857.

On April 1, 1863, the college was granted a university charter by the Commonwealth of Massachusetts, allowing the board of trustees to confer degrees typically awarded by colleges in the state. John Bapst served as the first President of Boston College and launched the collegiate instruction program on September 5, 1864.

The average age of students in its early years was fourteen, indicating a strong presence of high schoolers, which aligned with the Society of Jesus's preparatory tradition from Europe. The student body consisted mainly of local boys from greater Boston parishes, some of whom received scholarships, while campus life focused heavily on religious activities, requiring Catholic students to attend Mass, partake in confession, and join devotional societies. The curriculum was based on the Jesuit Ratio Studiorum, emphasizing Latin, Greek, philosophy, and theology.

Expansion of the South End buildings onto James Street enabled increased separation between the high school and college divisions, though Boston College High School remained a constituent part of Boston College until 1927, when it was separately incorporated.

=== Robert and Catharine Morris ===
In 1895, Catharine H. Morris, wife of the second African American to pass the bar in the United States, Robert Morris, bequeathed their family library to the Church of the Immaculate Conception, which was physically and administratively attached to the nascent Boston College. Morris, a civil rights leader and prominent legal defender of Boston's Irish immigrant community, maintained close relationships with the leaders of the young Boston College, including early president Robert J. Fulton.

Currently, the Burns Library holds just over 100 confirmed texts from the Morris library. The original donation is estimated to amount to 1000 volumes, and scholars and librarians at the university continue to recover books belonging to the original collection. This archive presents a valuable set of 19th century editions of literature, history, and anti-slavery texts. As historians Laurel Davis and Mary Sarah Bilder write, "Morris indeed may mark one of the first self-conscious African American collectors of the African American experience, placing him in the company of later collector Arturo Alfonso Schomburg, who sought to collect and understand the 'global black experience.'"

=== Move to Chestnut Hill ===
In 1907, newly installed president Thomas I. Gasson determined that BC's cramped, urban quarters in Boston's South End were inadequate and unsuited for significant expansion. Inspired by John Winthrop's early vision of Boston as a "city upon a hill", he re-imagined Boston College as a beacon of Jesuit scholarship. Less than a year after taking office, he purchased Amos Adams Lawrence's farm on Chestnut Hill, six miles (10 km) west of downtown. He organized an international competition for the design of a campus master plan and set about raising funds for the construction of the "new" university. Construction began in 1909.

By 1913, construction costs had surpassed available funds, and, as a result, Gasson Hall, "New BC's" main building, stood alone on Chestnut Hill for its first three years. While Maginnis's ambitious plans were never fully realized, BC's first "capital campaign"—which included a large replica of Gasson Hall's clock tower set up on Boston Common to measure the fundraising progress—ensured that President Gasson's vision survived.

=== Academic expansion and co-education ===
By the 1920s, BC began to fill out the dimensions of its university charter, establishing the Boston College Graduate School of Arts & Sciences, the Boston College Law School, and the Woods College of Advancing Studies, followed successively by the Boston College Graduate School of Social Work, the Carroll School of Management, the Connell School of Nursing, and the Lynch School of Education and Human Development. In 1926, Boston College conferred its first degrees on women (though it did not become fully coeducational until 1970). On April 20, 1963, an address by President John F. Kennedy, the nation's first Catholic president who had received an honorary degree in 1956, was the highlight of a week-long centennial celebration.

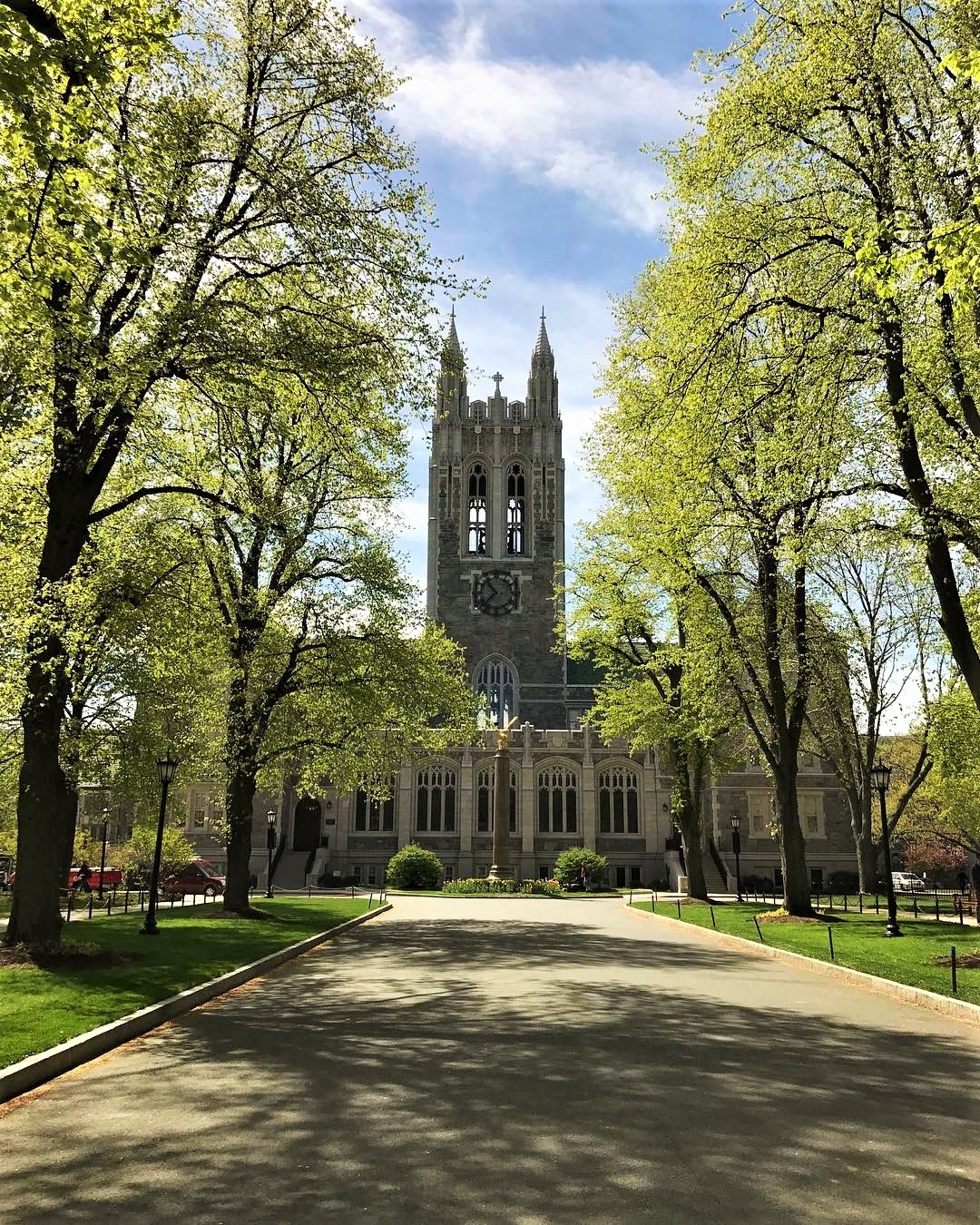
Gasson Hall in spring

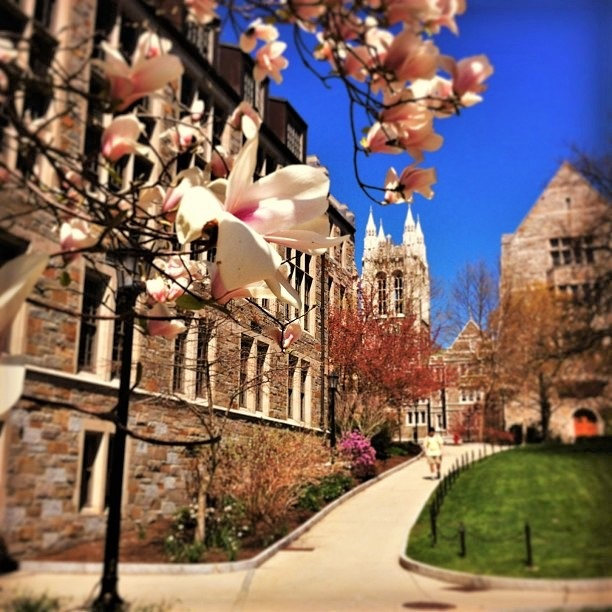
Gasson Hall in summer

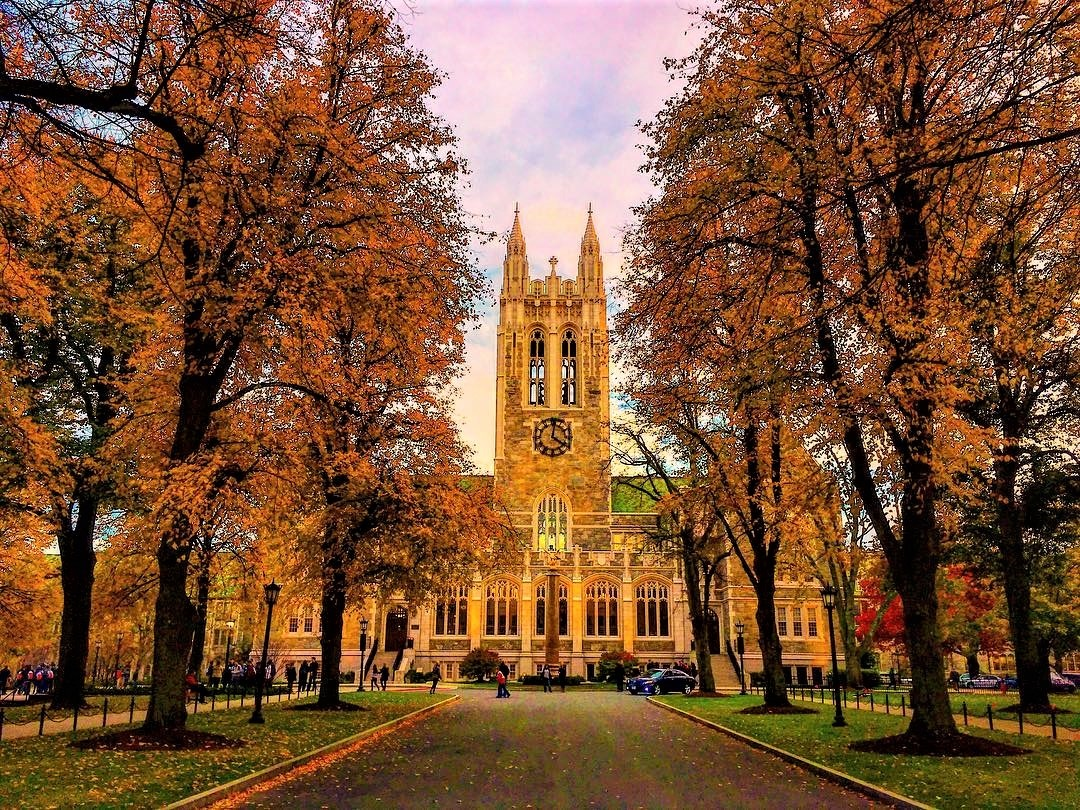
Gasson Hall in autumn

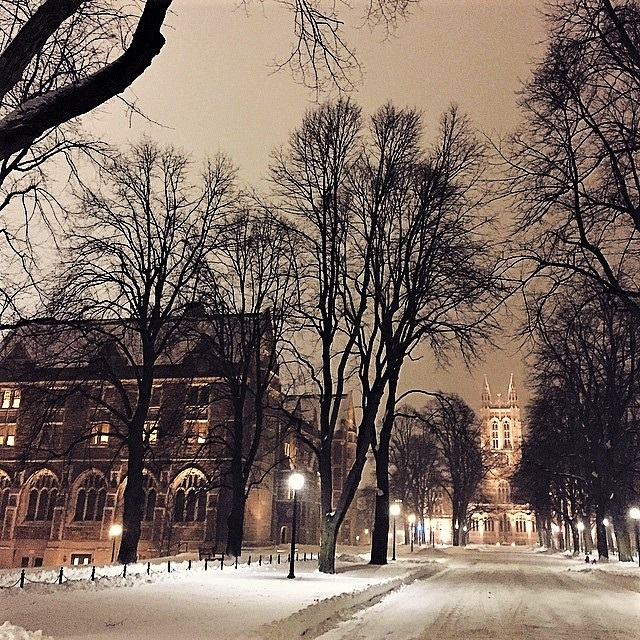
Gasson Hall in winter

=== Monan's presidency and institutional expansion ===
When J. Donald Monan began his presidency on September 5, 1972, Boston College faced significant financial challenges, including a $30 million debt and a frozen salary structure for faculty and staff. During his tenure, the Boston College Board of Trustees was restructured to include lay alumni and business leaders, moving away from its traditional composition of Society of Jesus members. In 1973, Monan appointed Frank B. Campanella as BC's first executive vice president to focus on fiscal matters and university administration. Campanella held this position until 1991. In 1974, BC adopted depreciation accounting, a novel approach at the time for universities, reflecting a more sophisticated financial strategy. BC merged with Newton College of the Sacred Heart in that same year, acquiring its 40-acre campus just 1.5 miles away, which allowed the Boston College Law School to relocate and provided much-needed housing for an increasingly residential student body.

In April 1976, BC launched a capital campaign to raise $21 million but ultimately secured $25 million. By 1982, the university had enjoyed a decade of financial stability, with an endowment of $36 million by the end of the 1981–82 academic year. Following an aggressive capital campaign in 1989 that raised $136 million, the endowment reached $250 million, surpassed $350 million in 1992, and exceeded $500 million by 1995. When Monan transitioned to University Chancellor in 1996, the endowment had grown to $590 million.

=== Continued growth and development ===
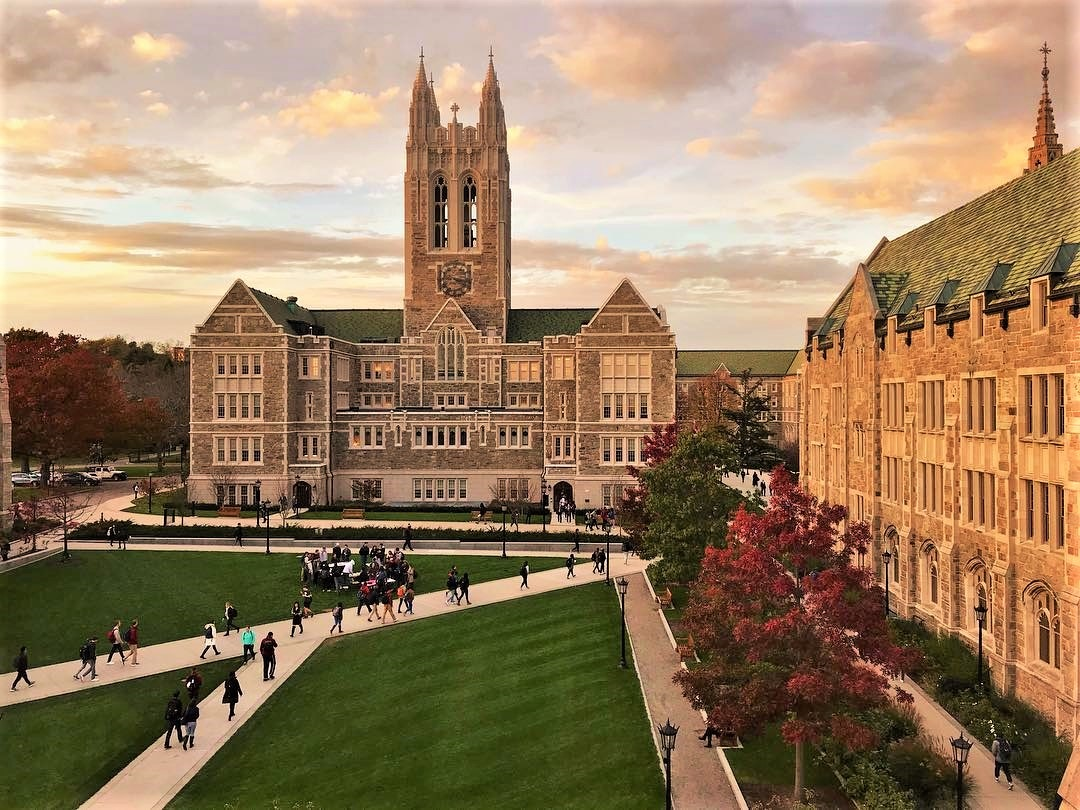
Gasson Quadrangle

Under the presidency of William P. Leahy, which began after Monan's tenure, Boston College experienced significant growth and development. In 2002, Leahy initiated the Church in the 21st Century program, addressing issues facing the Catholic Church in light of the clergy sexual abuse scandal, which positioned BC as a leader in advocating for Church reform. Plans to merge with the Weston Jesuit School of Theology furthered the university's ambition to be a leading intellectual center for Catholic theology in the United States.

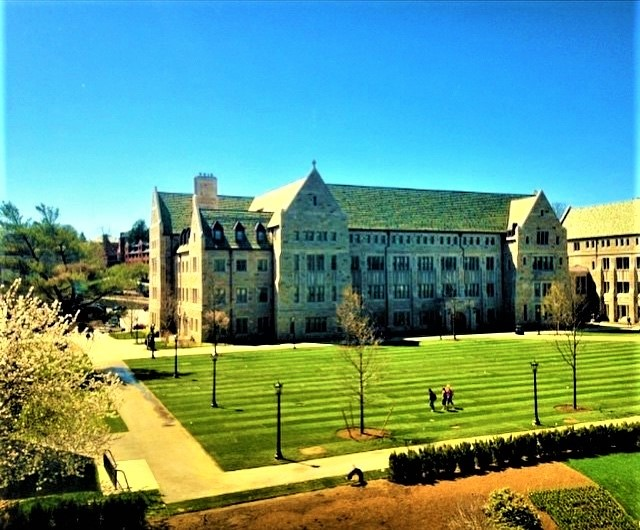
Campus Green

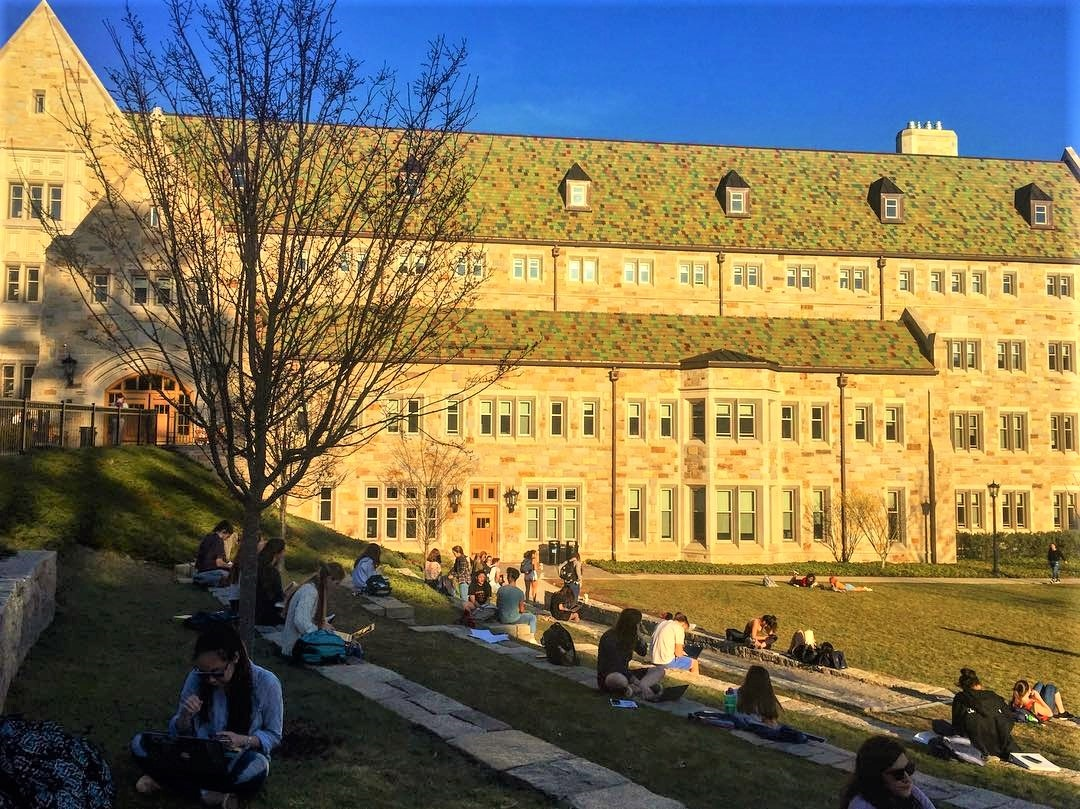
Stokes Hall amphitheater

In 2007, BC announced a $1.6 billion master plan for campus revitalization over ten years, aiming to enhance facilities and hire new faculty. While the plan received mixed reactions from city officials, it marked a significant step toward expanding the university's capabilities. By June 10, 2009, the Boston College Master Plan was approved by city authorities, allowing the university to enter the design and planning phases for its ambitious development projects. Through these initiatives, Boston College has continued to adapt and evolve as a prominent institution in higher education.

== Campuses ==
The Boston College campus is known generally as the "Heights" and to some as the "Crowned Hilltop" due largely to its location and presence of buildings featuring gothic towers reaching into the sky. The main campus is also listed on the National Register of Historic Places.

The University also encompasses the Connors Family Retreat and Conference Center in Dover, Massachusetts, the Weston Observatory in Weston, Massachusetts, and various other properties in the region.

=== Chestnut Hill Campus ===
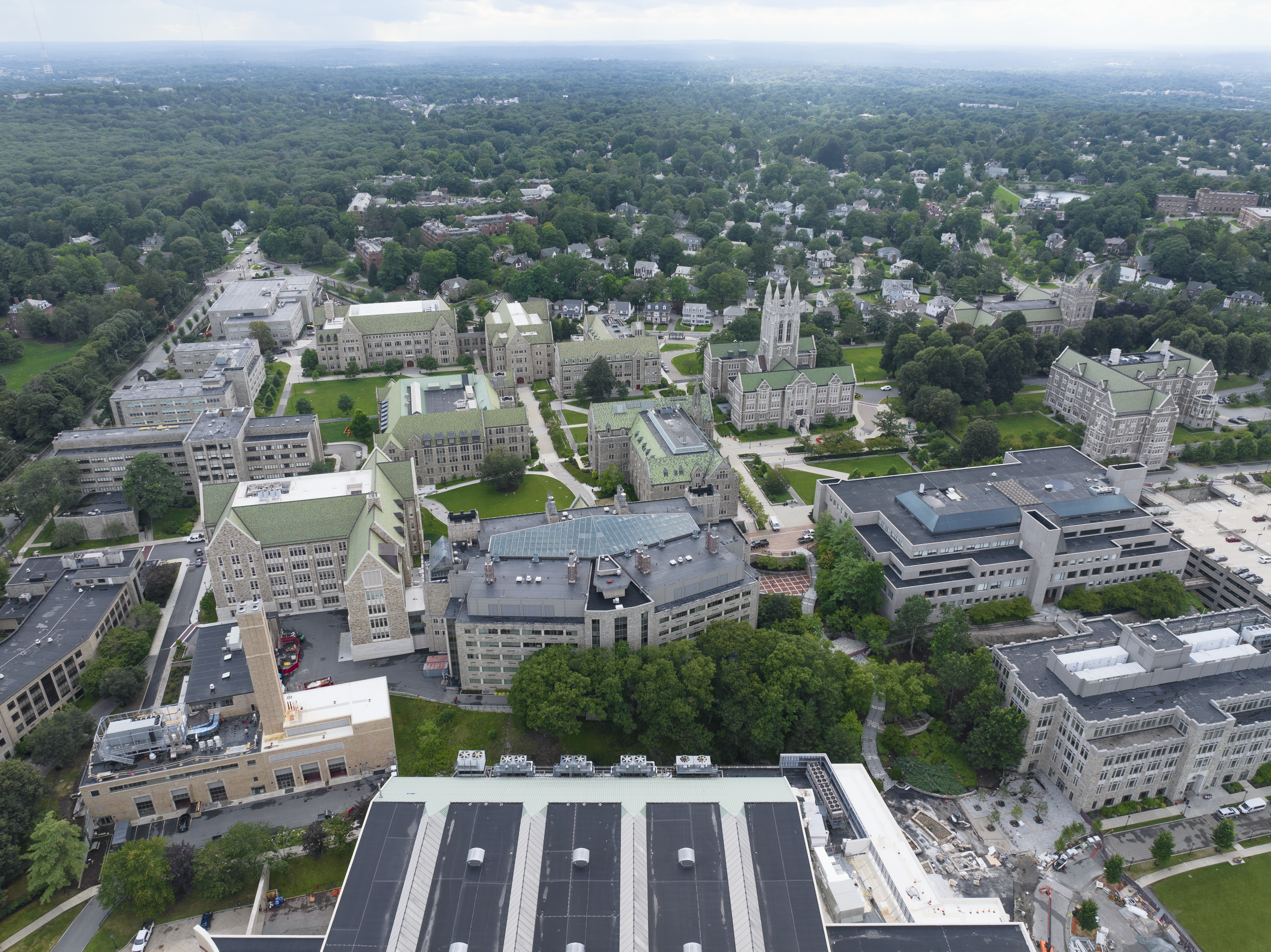
Aerial view of the Chestnut Hill main campus.

Boston College's main campus is located in Chestnut Hill, 6 miles (9.7 km) west of downtown Boston, is 175 acres and features over 120 buildings set atop a hill overlooking the Chestnut Hill Reservoir.

The campus is accessible via the Boston College station, situated at St. Ignatius Gate. This station serves as the western terminus of the Massachusetts Bay Transportation Authority (MBTA) Green Line's B branch (also known as the "Boston College" line), connecting the university to downtown Boston and other destinations.

==== Other properties ====
In 2017, Boston College acquired the 24-acre Mishkan Tefila Synagogue property in Chestnut Hill, which was previously used for administrative services and event parking. The synagogue's 806-seat auditorium has since been transformed into the university's largest theater venue for the Robsham Theater Arts Center, alongside a ballroom-style multi-purpose room and a hexagon-shaped meeting room for various events. An outdoor quad is also available for performances and gatherings. In 2019, the City of Newton took approximately 17 wooded acres of the property through eminent domain. In 2020, Boston College further expanded its mission by acquiring Pine Manor College, a financially struggling liberal arts institution in Chestnut Hill that served a significant number of first-generation and inner-city students.

=== Newton Campus ===
In 1975, Boston College merged with Newton College of the Sacred Heart. The Centre Street campus of the Newton College has since become housing for freshmen of Boston College and the current location of the Boston College Law School. Athletic fields for some of Boston College's teams have also been constructed on Newton Campus. The campus is located 1 mile west of the main campus and is serviced by the university bus system.

=== Brighton Campus ===
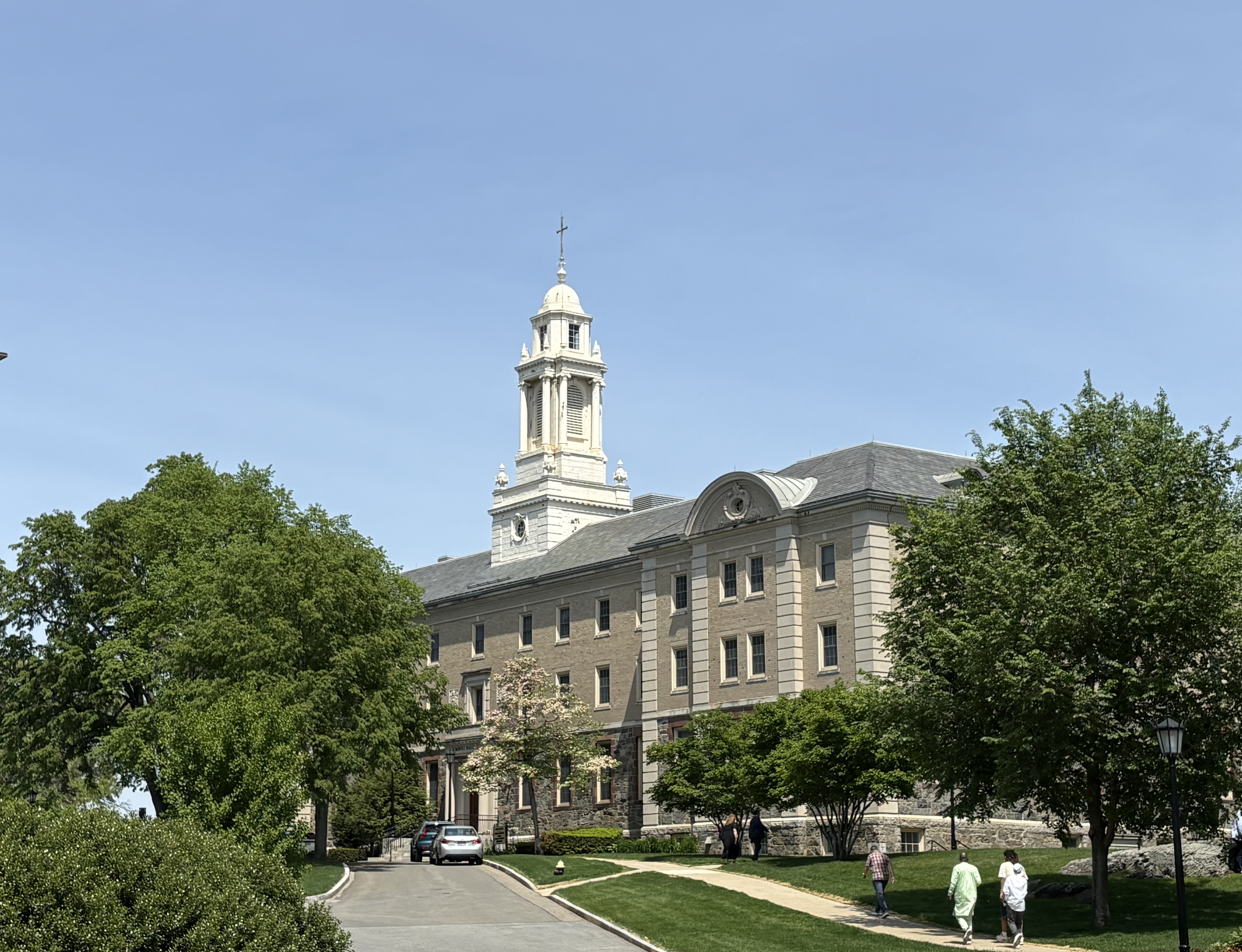
Simboli Hall, Clough School of Theology

Between 2004 and 2007, Boston College acquired 65 acres (260,000 m^{2}) of land from the Archdiocese of Boston. This included the archdiocese's former headquarters, sold to the university in 2004 for $107,400,000. This land holds a variety of buildings for the school of theology, along with facilities for the men's baseball and women's softball team.

=== Brookline Campus ===
The Brookline campus is home to Messina College (formerly Pine Manor College), which includes several residence halls and other academic and athletic facilities. Messina College opened in July 2024 for over 100 first-generation college students. It offers associate degrees in applied data science, health sciences, general business, and applied psychology and human development. The college emphasizes support for underprivileged students through a residential model, small class sizes, and mentorship, preparing graduates for workforce entry or transfer to four-year institutions.

== Organization and administration ==
Its annual operating budget is approximately $1.02 billion. The most recent and ongoing fundraising campaign, dubbed "Soaring Higher", was announced on September 28, 2023. The campaign aims to raise $3 billion, double the last campaign's goal. Of this goal, $1.1 billion is earmarked for student financial aid, $750 million is for student life initiatives, and $1.15 billion is for academic programs.

=== Catholic and Jesuit ===
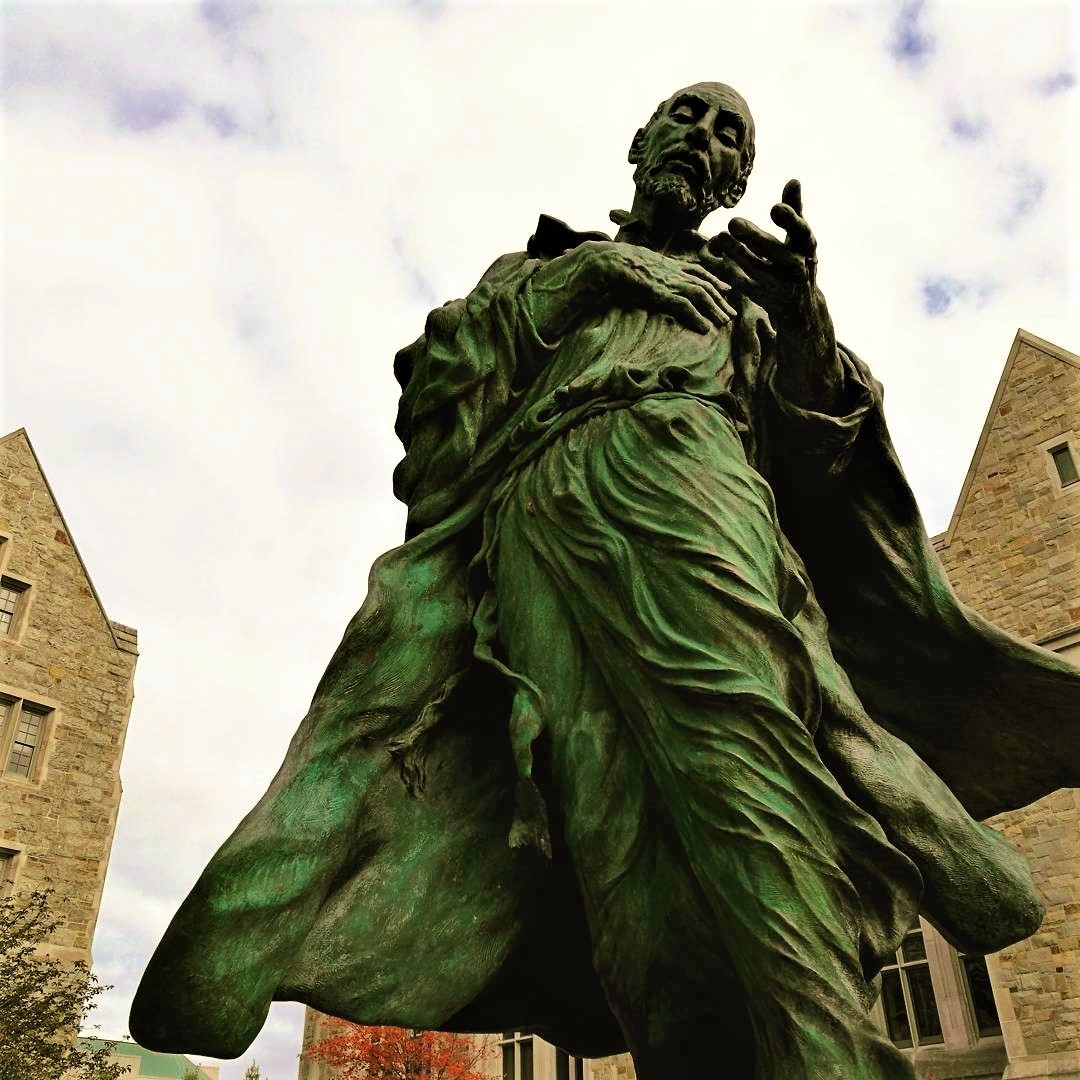
St. Ignatius of Loyola statue by Bolivian-born artist Pablo Eduardo.

As of 2005, there were 112 Jesuits living on the Boston College campus, including members of the faculty and administration, graduate students, and visiting international scholars.

The chapel for the university is located in St. Mary's Hall, the Jesuit residential facility. Additional BC chapels are Trinity Chapel on the Newton Campus, St. Joseph's Chapel in the Basement of Gonzaga Hall on Upper Campus, Simboli Hall Chapel on the Brighton Campus, and St. Catherine of Sienna Chapel in Cushing Hall. Over 70 Catholic Masses are celebrated on Campus each week during the Academic Year. The college also maintains close relations with the nearby Church of Saint Ignatius of Loyola.

=== Affiliated institutions ===
St. Columbkille Parish is a Catholic Church and elementary school in Brighton, Massachusetts, that has an alliance with BC. Under the agreement, the parish school is to be governed by a board of members and a board of trustees comprising representatives from the Archdiocese of Boston, Boston College, St. Columbkille Parish and the greater Boston community.

== Academics ==
=== Schools and colleges ===
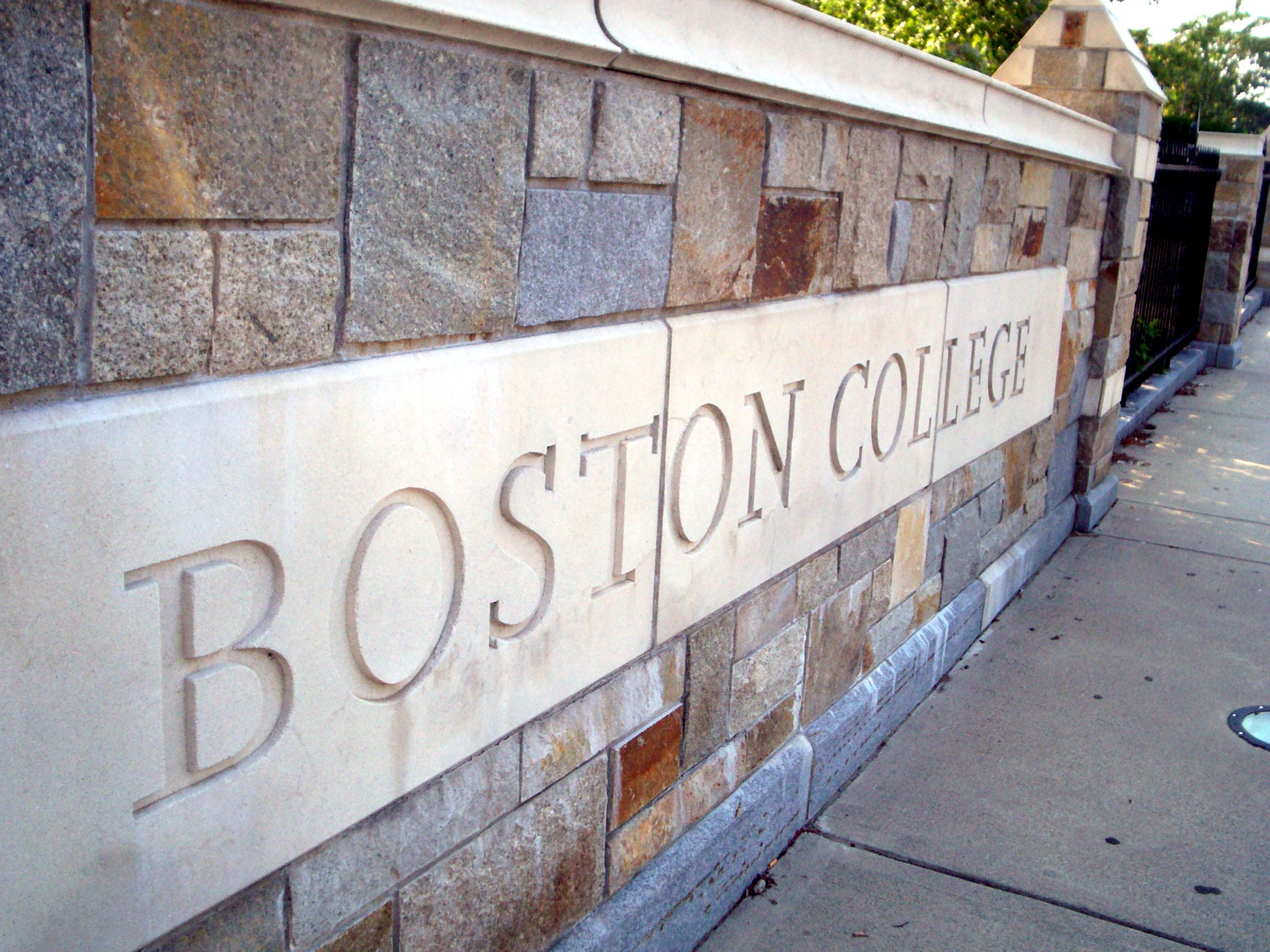
St. Ignatius Gate entrance

Boston College is made up of a total of nine constituent colleges and schools:

- Morrissey College of Arts & Sciences
- Carroll School of Management
- Lynch School of Education and Human Development
- Connell School of Nursing
- Boston College School of Social Work
- Boston College Law School
- Gloria L. and Charles I. Clough School of Theology and Ministry
- Woods College of Advancing Studies
- Messina College

=== Rankings ===
Academic rankings

National
- Forbes: 51
- U.S. News & World Report: 31
- Washington Monthly: 50
- WSJ/College Pulse: 100

Global
- ARWU: 501–600
- QS: 549
- THE: 284
- U.S. News & World Report: 491

National program rankings
| Program | Ranking |
|---|---|
| Biological Sciences | 104 |
| Business | 48 |
| Chemistry | 52 |
| Economics | 25 |
| Education | 19 |
| English | 44 |
| History | 41 |
| Law | 20 |
| Nursing–Anesthesia | 20 |
| Nursing: Master's | 27 |
| Physics | 71 |
| Political Science | 61 |
| Psychology | 53 |
| Social Work | 7 |
| Sociology | 42 |

Global subject rankings
| Program | Ranking |
|---|---|
| Arts & Humanities | 188 |
| Chemistry | 304 |
| Economics & Business | 53 |
| Philosophy | 51 |
| Theology, Divinity, and Religion | 5 |

Boston College tied for 39th among national universities and tied for 625th among global universities in U.S. News & World Report's "America's Best Colleges 2023–2024" rankings and 88th in the Forbes 2023 edition of "America's Top Colleges". In 2016, the undergraduate school of business, the Carroll School of Management, placed 3rd in an annual ranking of U.S. undergraduate business schools by Bloomberg Businessweek. A 2007 Princeton Review survey of parents that asked "What 'dream college' would you most like to see your child attend were prospects of acceptance or cost not issues?" placed BC 6th. Boston College is accredited by the New England Commission of Higher Education.

=== Order of the Cross and Crown ===
The Order of the Cross and Crown, founded in 1939, is the College of Arts and Sciences honor society for seniors who have achieved an average of at least A−, as well as established records of unusual service and leadership on the campus. The selections committee, composed of the deans, faculty members, and administration, appoints specially distinguished members of the Order to be its officers as Chief Marshal and Marshals. Induction into the Cross and Crown Honor Society is one of the highest and most prestigious honors that BC students can receive.

=== Research ===
==== Scholarly publications ====
- Boston College Law Review
- C21 Resources, a progressive journal of contemporary Catholic issues, published by BC's Church in the 21st Century Center.
- Dianoia: The Undergraduate Philosophy Journal of Boston College, a journal featuring undergraduate work in philosophy from around the world.
- The Eagletarian, published by The BC Economics Association.
- Guide to Jesuit Education
- Journal of Technology, Learning and Assessment
- Lumen et Vita: The Graduate Academic Journal of the Boston College School of Theology and Ministry,
- New Arcadia Review
- Religion and the Arts Journal
- Studies in Christian-Jewish Relations, the official journal of the Council of Centers of Jewish-Christian Relations (CCJR) and is published by the Center for Christian-Jewish Learning at Boston College and the Boston College Libraries.
- Teaching Exceptional Children / Teaching Exceptional Children Plus
- Uniform Commercial Code Reporter-Digest

=== Admissions ===
For the Class of 2029, Boston College received 39,681 applications and admitted 12.6%. Academically, 95 percent of the admitted students rank within the top 10 percent of their graduating classes and their SAT/ACT test scores average 1503 and 34, respectively. A total of 74 percent submitted standardized scores, despite the University’s test-optional policy. The accepted class includes students from all 50 states and 75 foreign countries. The college is need-blind for domestic applicants.

Admissions figures by class year
| Class | Applications | Admitted | Admit rate | Total enrolled | Yield |
|---|---|---|---|---|---|
| 2029 | 39,681 | 4,999 | 12.6% | 2,400 | 48% |
| 2028 | 35,475 | 5,632 | 15.9% | 2,394 | 43% |
| 2027 | 36,525 | 5,511 | 15% | 2,335 | 42% |
| 2026 | 40,494 | 6,748 | 16.7% | 2,335 | 37% |
| 2025 | 39,877 | 7,536 | 18.9% | 2,516 | 33% |
| 2024 | 29,400 | 7,752 | 26% | 2,408 | 31% |
| 2023 | 35,552 | 9,679 | 27% | 2,297 | 24% |
| 2022 | 31,084 | 8,669 | 28% | 2,327 | 27% |
| 2021 | 28,454 | 9,223 | 32% | 2,412 | 26% |
| 2020 | 28,956 | 9,017 | 31% | 2,359 | 26% |
| 2019 | 29,486 | 8,405 | 29% | 2,162 | 26% |
| 2018 | 23,223 | 7,875 | 34% | 2,288 | 29% |

== Libraries and museums ==
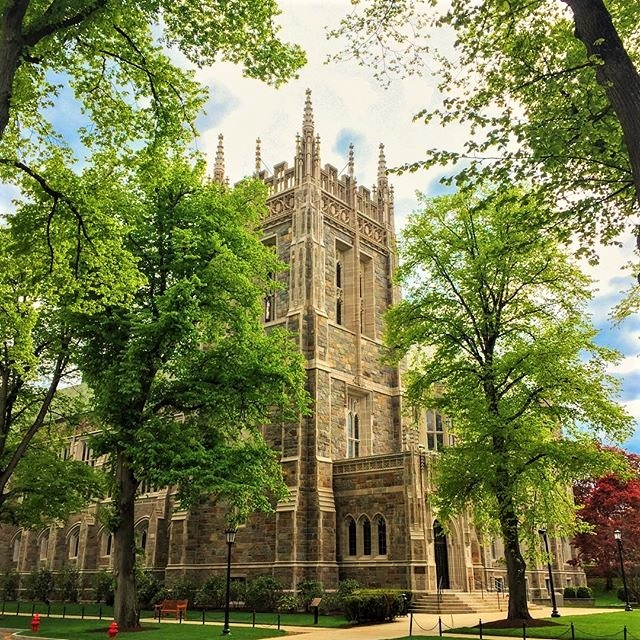
Burns Library

Boston College's eight research libraries contain over two million printed volumes. Including manuscripts, journals, government documents and microform items, ranging from ancient papyrus scrolls to digital databases, the collections have some twelve million items. Together with the university's museums, they include original manuscripts and prints by Galileo, Ignatius of Loyola, and Francis Xavier as well as collections in Jesuitana, Irish literature, sixteenth-century Flemish tapestries, ancient Greek pottery, Caribbean folk art and literature, Japanese prints, U.S. government documents, Congressional archives, and paintings that span the history of art from Europe, Asia, and the Americas.

Libraries include: O'Neill, Bapst, Burns Library, Educational Resource Center of the Lynch School of Education and Human Development, BC Law Library, O'Connor Library at Weston Observatory (Boston College), Social Work Library at the Boston College School of Social Work, and the Theology and Ministry Library.

=== McMullen Museum of Art ===
The McMullen Museum of Art, located on Boston College's Brighton campus, was established in 1993 and named in 1996 to honor John J. McMullen's parents. In 2016, it moved to a new facility with nearly double the exhibition space and enhanced features. The museum is recognized for its multidisciplinary exhibitions that contextualize art within broader political and cultural narratives, with notable collections including works by prominent artists such as Winslow Homer and Pablo Picasso. Significant exhibitions have included "Carrie Mae Weems: Strategies of Engagement" and "Saints and Sinners: Caravaggio and the Baroque Image," which helped establish the museum's reputation.

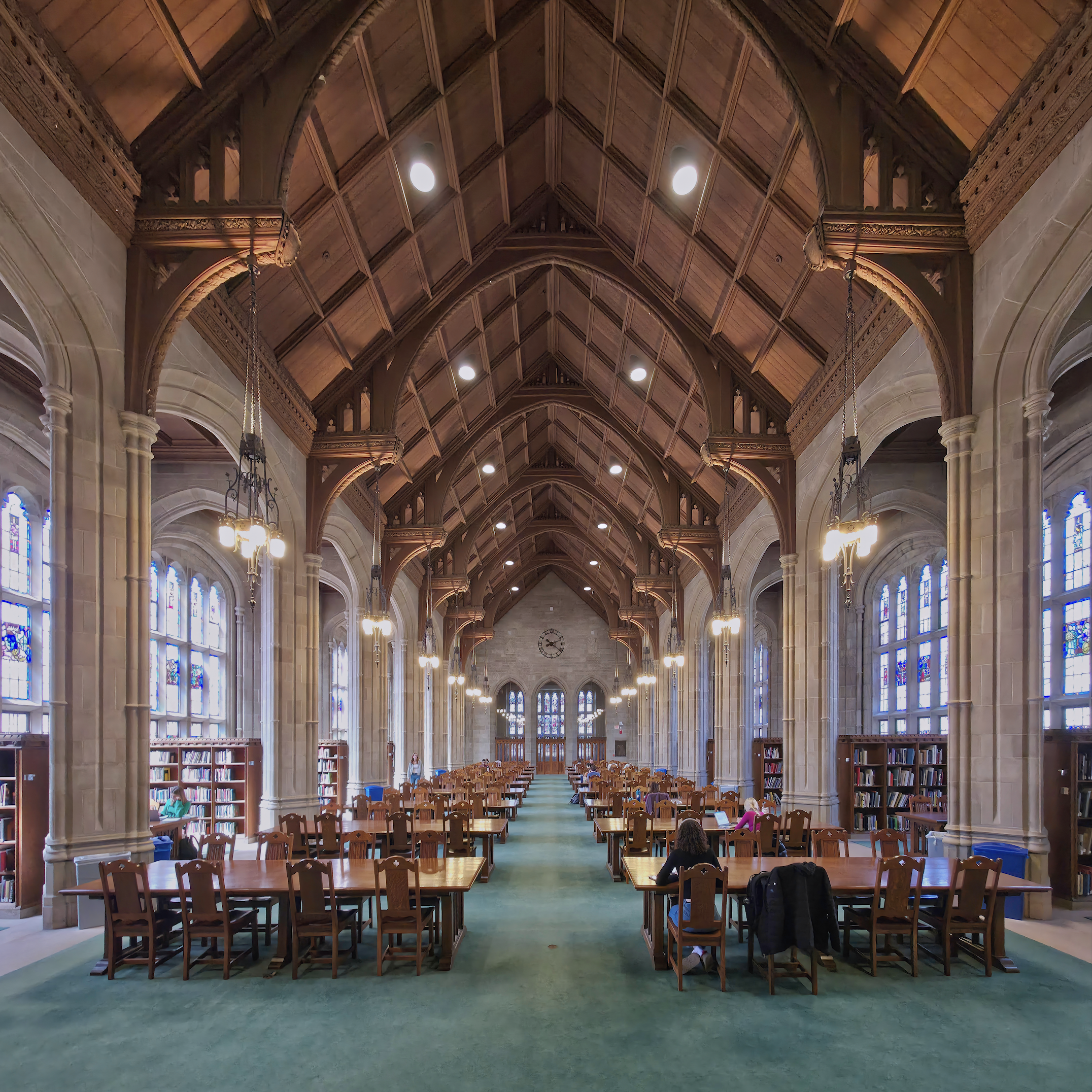
Gargan Hall, Bapst Library

=== O'Neill Library ===
Before the Thomas P. O’Neill, Jr. Library opened in 1984, Bapst Library had served as BC's main research facility since 1925. During Monan's tenure, the university transformed from a small college into a national institution. Monan played a key role in planning O’Neill Library to meet the needs of this transformation. In a 1992 interview, Monan expressed pride in the library's impact, noting how it was often filled with students studying and contributing to the overall learning experience for both students and faculty.

=== Bapst Library ===
Opened in 1928, Bapst Library was named for the first president of Boston College (Johannes Bapst, 1815 to 1887) and it was one of the few structures built according to Charles Donagh Maginnis' original "Oxford in America" master plan. Bapst served as the university's main library until 1984.

== Student life ==
Student body composition as of May 2, 2022
| Race and ethnicity | Total |
|---|---|
| White | 58% |
| Hispanic | 11% |
| Asian | 10% |
| Foreign national | 8% |
| Other (Note: Other consists of Multiracial Americans & those who prefer to not say.) | 8% |
| Black | 4% |
Economic diversity
| Low-income (Note: The percentage of students who received an income-based federal Pell grant intended for low-income students.) | 13% |
| Affluent (Note: The percentage of students who are a part of the American middle class at the bare minimum.) | 87% |

=== AHANA ===
AHANA is the term Boston College uses to refer to persons of African-American, Hispanic, Asian, and Native American descent. The term was coined at Boston College in 1979 by two students, Alfred Feliciano and Valerie Lewis, who objected to the name "Office of Minority Programs" used by Boston College at the time. They cited the definition of the word minority as "less than" and proposed, instead, to use the term AHANA, which they felt celebrated social and cultural differences. After receiving overwhelming approval from the university's board of trustees and UGBC president Dan Cotter, the Office of Minority Student Programs became the Office of AHANA Student Programs. The term, or one or its derivative forms, such as ALANA (where "Latino" is substituted for "Hispanic"), has become common on a number of other American university campuses. Boston College, which has registered the term AHANA as a trademark, has granted official permission for its use to over 50 institutions and organizations in the United States. Many more use the term unofficially. Other institutions that use the AHANA acronym include Suffolk University, Cleveland State University, Eastern Mennonite University, Saint Martin's University, Le Moyne College, and Salem State University. There have been cases of racist graffiti and vandalism on dorm walls.

=== Student media ===
Newspapers

- The Heights, the principal student newspaper, published weekly; established in 1919
- The Gavel, an independent progressive student magazine; launched on October 27, 2009. The Gavel publishes most articles online, but brought back its print edition in the Spring of 2018.
- The Torch, an independent Catholic student newspaper that publishes stories covering Catholic news on campus and around the world as well as student faith reflections. It was established in 2013.
- The New England Classic, a satirical newspaper unrecognized by the university but regularly published and distributed on campus; launched in Fall 2007 and is independently funded.
- Colloquium Political Science Journal, The political science journal of Boston College that is sponsored by the Institute for the Liberal Arts at Boston College.

Broadcasting

- WZBC, 90.3 FM, the student-run radio station which provides independent and experimental music
- Boston College Television (BCTV), a student-run cable television station that formerly featured a show known as Now You Know, but now reports on student life, sports, entertainment, and other subjects

Other notable publications

- Sub Turri, (Under the Tower) the Boston College yearbook, published since 1913
- The Stylus of Boston College, the undergraduate literary magazine, founded in 1882
- Elements Undergraduate Research Journal, the premier undergraduate research journal of Boston College, published twice a year
- Al Noor: The Undergraduate Middle Eastern Studies Journal of Boston College, one of the only undergraduate Middle Eastern and Islamic Studies Journals in the world.
- Kaleidoscope International Journal, the international relations and global studies journal of Boston College
- Dianoia: The Undergraduate Philosophy Journal of Boston College

Ensembles

- BC bOp!, the Boston College jazz band
- Boston College "Screaming Eagles" Marching Band
- Boston College Symphony Orchestra,
- Pep Band, the ensemble that performs at Boston College hockey and basketball games
- University Wind Ensemble of Boston College
- University Symphonic Band
- University Chorale of Boston College
- Madrigal Singers of Boston College

==== Theater performance ====
- The Dramatics Society
- Contemporary Theater

=== Alma mater ===
"Alma Mater" was written by T. J. Hurley, who also wrote "For Boston" (the Boston College fight song) and was a member of the Class of 1885.

== Eagles athletics program ==
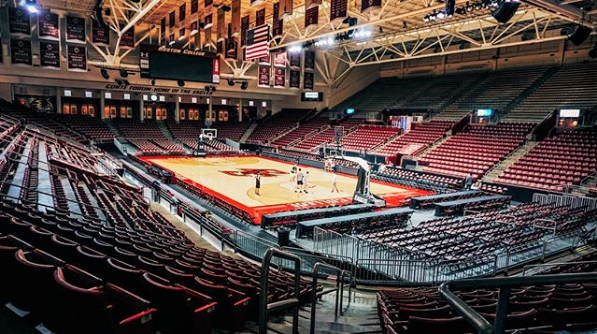
Silvio O. Conte Forum

Boston College's athletic teams, known as the Eagles, compete at the NCAA Division I level across various sports, including football in the Football Bowl Subdivision (FBS). They have been members of the Atlantic Coast Conference (ACC) since the 2005–06 season after previously competing in the Big East Conference from 1979 to 1980 to 2004–05. Notably, Boston College was the only Catholic institution that played football in the Big East.

The men's teams participate in several ACC sports, such as baseball, basketball, cross country, football, golf, soccer, swimming, tennis, and track & field. Additionally, the Eagles compete in non-ACC sports like fencing, ice hockey, sailing, and skiing.

The women's teams have a similarly broad range of sports, including ACC competitions in basketball, cross country, field hockey, golf, lacrosse, rowing, soccer, softball, swimming, tennis, track & field, and volleyball. Beyond the ACC, they also compete in fencing, ice hockey, sailing, and skiing.

=== Athletic facilities ===
The main venue for football is Alumni Stadium, which accommodates 44,500 spectators. It stands as the centerpiece of Boston College's athletic facilities. Conte Forum, housing Kelley Rink, serves as the home for basketball and ice hockey, with seating capacities of 8,606 and 7,884, respectively.

The university also offers other key facilities, such as Eddie Pellagrini Diamond at John Shea Field, which is the home field for baseball with a capacity of 1,000, and the Newton Soccer Complex, which seats 1,000 fans. The Margot Connell Recreation Center provides additional support for athletic training and student recreation, while the Yawkey Athletics Center, opened in 2005, further enhances the university's athletic infrastructure.

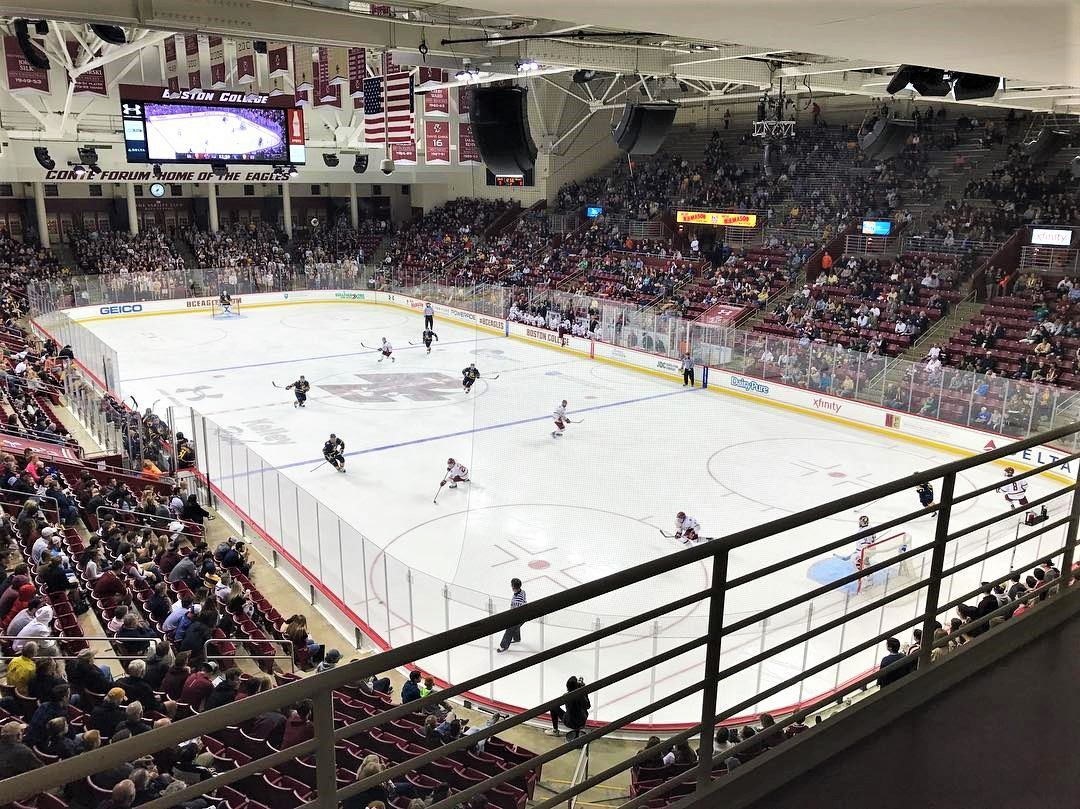
An ice hockey game played at "Kelley Rink", Conte Forum.

=== Traditions and mascot ===
The official school colors, maroon and gold, are displayed at all athletic events.

Eagle mascot – Baldwin:

The Eagle serves as the iconic mascot for Boston College, with the character Baldwin the Eagle representing this symbol of pride and tradition at football, hockey, and basketball games. Baldwin, named as a play on the "bald" head of the American bald eagle and the word "win," embodies the spirit of the Eagles.

==== Fight Song: "For Boston" ====
"For Boston" is claimed to be America's oldest college fight song, composed by T. J. Hurley in 1885. Boston-based band Dropkick Murphys covered this song on their album Sing Loud, Sing Proud!. Changes have been made to the song, including reworking the phrase "for here men are men" into "for here all are one" in the first verse.

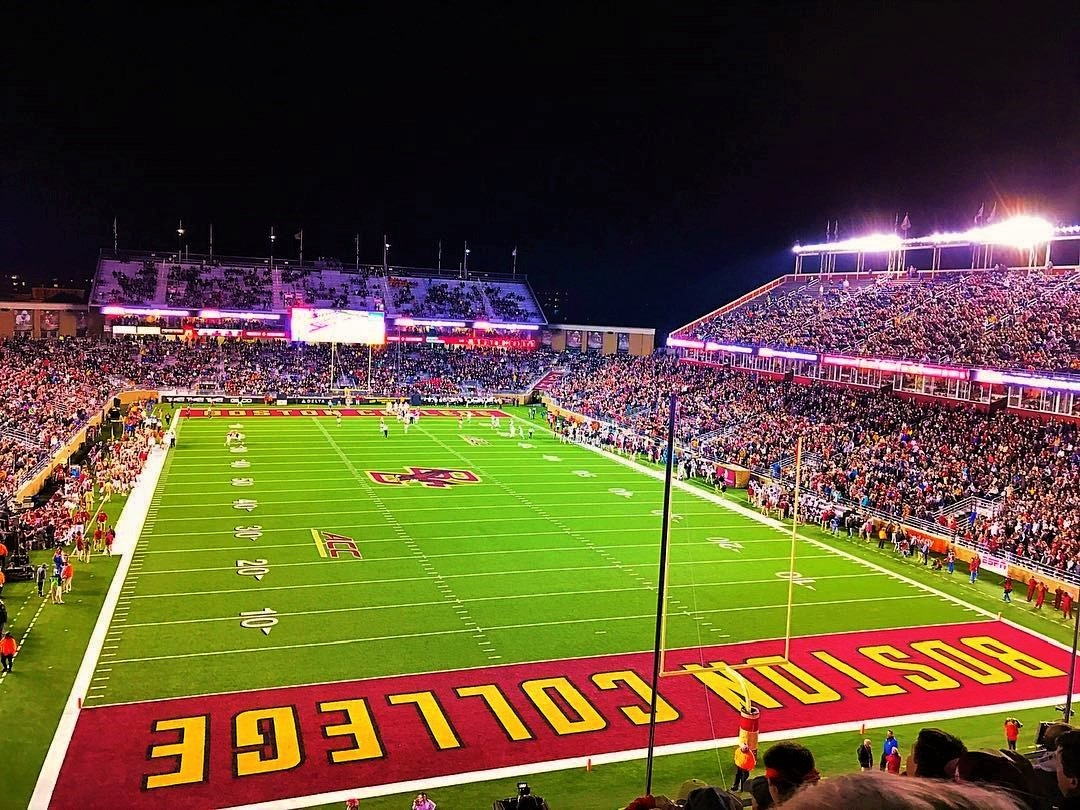
Alumni Stadium, home of the Boston College Eagles.

==== Red bandanas ====
The Eagles annually wear red bandanna-themed uniforms in honor of fallen September 11, 2001 hero Welles Crowther, class of 1999. Crowther, who played on BC's lacrosse team, was an equity trader who died saving the lives of at least 10 people during the 2001 terrorist attack on the World Trade Center in New York City. He used a red bandanna that he often carried to keep from breathing in smoke and debris.

=== Hockey ===
The Boston College Eagles men's ice hockey team has won 5 NCAA Hockey Championships, including 2008, 2010, and 2012. Boston College Eagles women's ice hockey have won the Hockey East championship three times, and made seven trips to the Frozen Four of the NCAA tournament. BC participates in the annual Beanpot tournaments held at TD Garden, competing against the Northeastern University Huskies, Harvard University Crimson, and Boston University Terriers.

=== Football ===
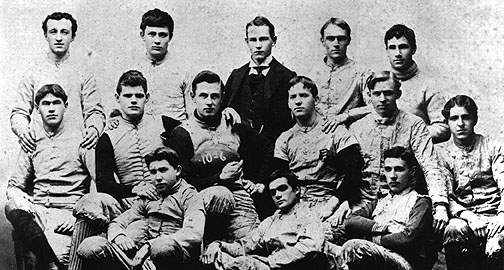
Boston College's first football team in 1893.

The Boston College Eagles football team represents Boston College in American football and competes in the NCAA Division I Football Bowl Subdivision (FBS) as a member of the Atlantic Coast Conference (ACC). Home games are played at Alumni Stadium, located on the university's campus in Chestnut Hill, Massachusetts. The team is currently coached by Bill O'Brien, who has previously served as head coach at Penn State and as an offensive coordinator at Alabama and the NFL's New England Patriots.

Founded in 1892, the Eagles have a rich history, winning four Eastern championships in 1940, 1942, 1983, and 1984, as well as a co-Big East championship in 2004. The program claims a national championship in 1940, although this title is not recognized by the NCAA.

With over 690 wins and a postseason bowl game record of 15–13, the team has participated in notable bowls such as the 1941 Sugar Bowl and the 1985 Cotton Bowl. The Eagles have produced a Heisman Trophy winner, Doug Flutie, along with 13 consensus All-Americans and over 200 NFL players. Additionally, eight members of the program have been inducted into the College Football Hall of Fame, while Art Donovan and Ernie Stautner have earned spots in the Pro Football Hall of Fame.

=== Women's lacrosse ===
The Boston College Eagles women's lacrosse team is an NCAA Division I college lacrosse team representing Boston College as part of the Atlantic Coast Conference. They play their home games at Newton Soccer Complex in Newton, Massachusetts, and occasionally, at Alumni Stadium in Chestnut Hill, Massachusetts.

== Protests and controversy ==
=== 1970 protest ===
In 1970, BC faced student unrest due to a proposed $500 tuition increase amid a financial crisis, prompting protests and a strike led by students and supported by Professor Harold Petersen. As tensions escalated, students voiced concerns over rising costs and a lack of administrative transparency, ultimately leading to a broader anti-war movement following the Kent State shootings. This period was marked by significant campus activism, with BC students pushing for changes that culminated in the severing of ties with ROTC in the fall of 1970.

=== LGBTQ discrimination ===
In 2003, after years of student-led discussions and efforts, and administrators' repeated rejection of pleas from students, the school approved a Gay–Straight Alliance, the first university-funded gay support group on campus. In 2004, between 1,000 and 1,200 students rallied behind a student-led campaign to expand the school's non-discrimination statement to include equal protection for gays and lesbians. Earlier that year 84% of the student body voted in favor of a student referendum calling for a change in policy. After several months of discussion the university changed its statement of nondiscrimination to make it more welcoming to gay students in May 2005, but stopped short of prohibiting discrimination based on sexual orientation.

=== Protests against racism ===
On October 18, 2017, hundreds of students walked out of class in a protest against racism and to demand the college officials pay more attention to the school's racial climate. The walk out was sparked by the defacing of two Black Lives Matter posters and an offensive photo was circulated on social media sites. On December 8, 2018, walls, furniture, and a bathroom in the Welch Hall were vandalized with racist, anti-black graffiti. Also, over the previous months, pro-refugee and Black Lives Matter signs were repeatedly removed around campus.

=== Censorship of pro-Palestinian demonstrators ===
In early 2025, Boston College faced criticism over its handling of a pro-Palestinian student demonstration. Organizers alleged that the University required extensive prior approval of chants, signs, speakers, and promotional materials, and restricted certain language before permitting the event. The approval process took several weeks, exceeding the timeline outlined in the University's Student Demonstrations Policy, prompting concerns that the requirements unduly limited student expression.

The controversy drew national attention after the Foundation for Individual Rights and Expression criticized BC's demonstration policies, arguing that they amounted to prior restraint and granted administrators excessive discretion over protected speech. The organization called for policy reforms, while University officials defended the rules as necessary to balance free expression with campus safety and order.

== Notable persons ==
BC students were universally called "Heightsmen" until 1925 when Caitlin Beckman became the first "Heightswoman" to receive a BC degree. "Heightsonian" was originally conceived as a way to gender neutralize the original term "Heightsmen", though "Eagles", once exclusively used for members of the university's athletics teams, is more commonly used. The term "Golden Eagles" refers strictly to BC graduates who have celebrated their 50th anniversary reunion. "Double Eagles" refer to alumni received an undergraduate and graduate degree from the college and "Triple Eagles" are those alumni who are also attended Boston College High School.

There are over 179,000 alumni in over 120 countries around the world. Boston College students have been recipients of Rhodes, Marshall, Mellon, Fulbright, Truman, Churchill, and Goldwater scholarships. Boston College alumni include 3 Rhodes, 22 Truman, and 171 Fulbright scholars.

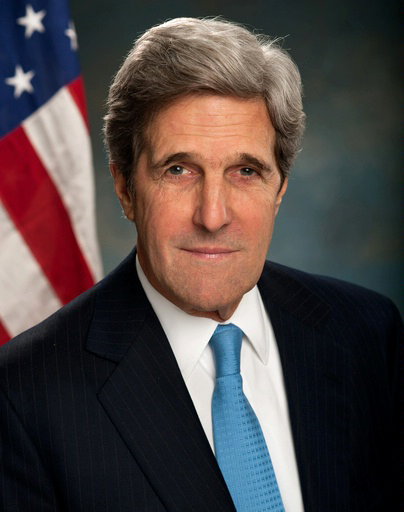
John F. Kerry
U.S. Secretary of State
U.S. Senator
2004 Democratic Presidential nominee
J.D. 1976

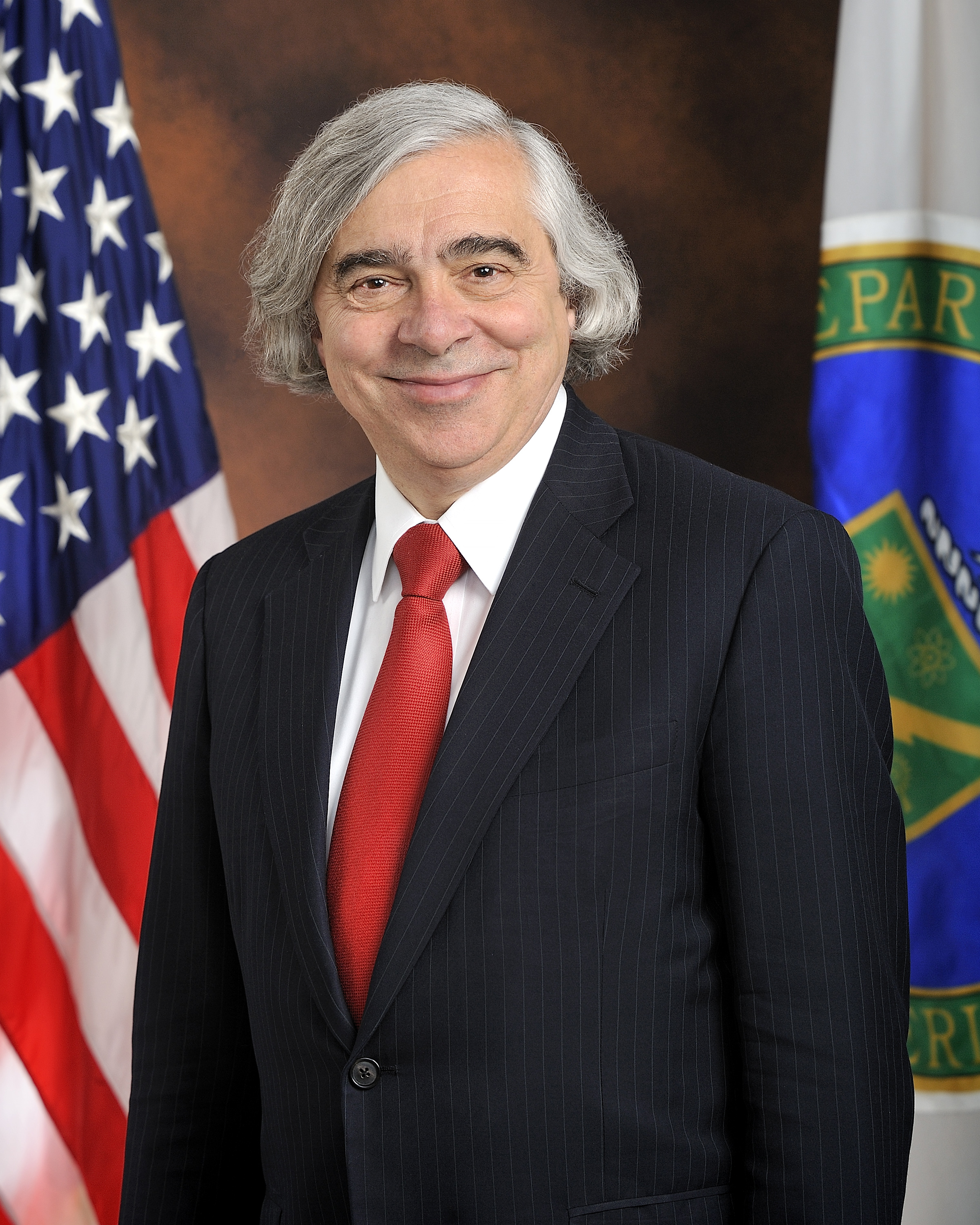
Ernest Moniz
U.S. Secretary of Energy
1966

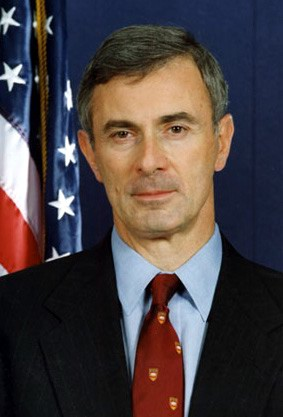
Paul Cellucci
Governor of Massachusetts
U.S. Ambassador to Canada
1970, J.D. 1973

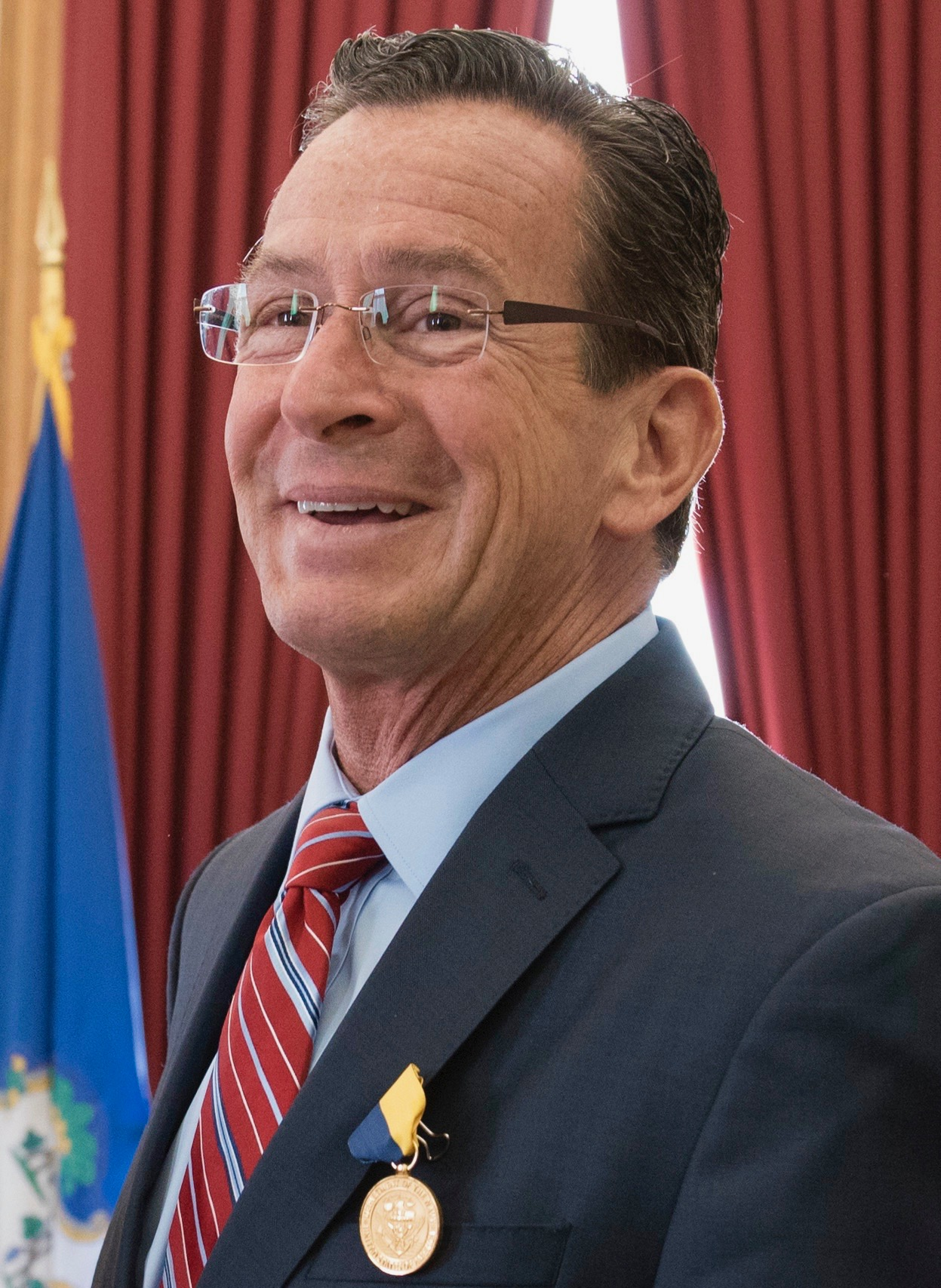
Dannel P. Malloy
Governor of Connecticut
1977, J.D. 1980

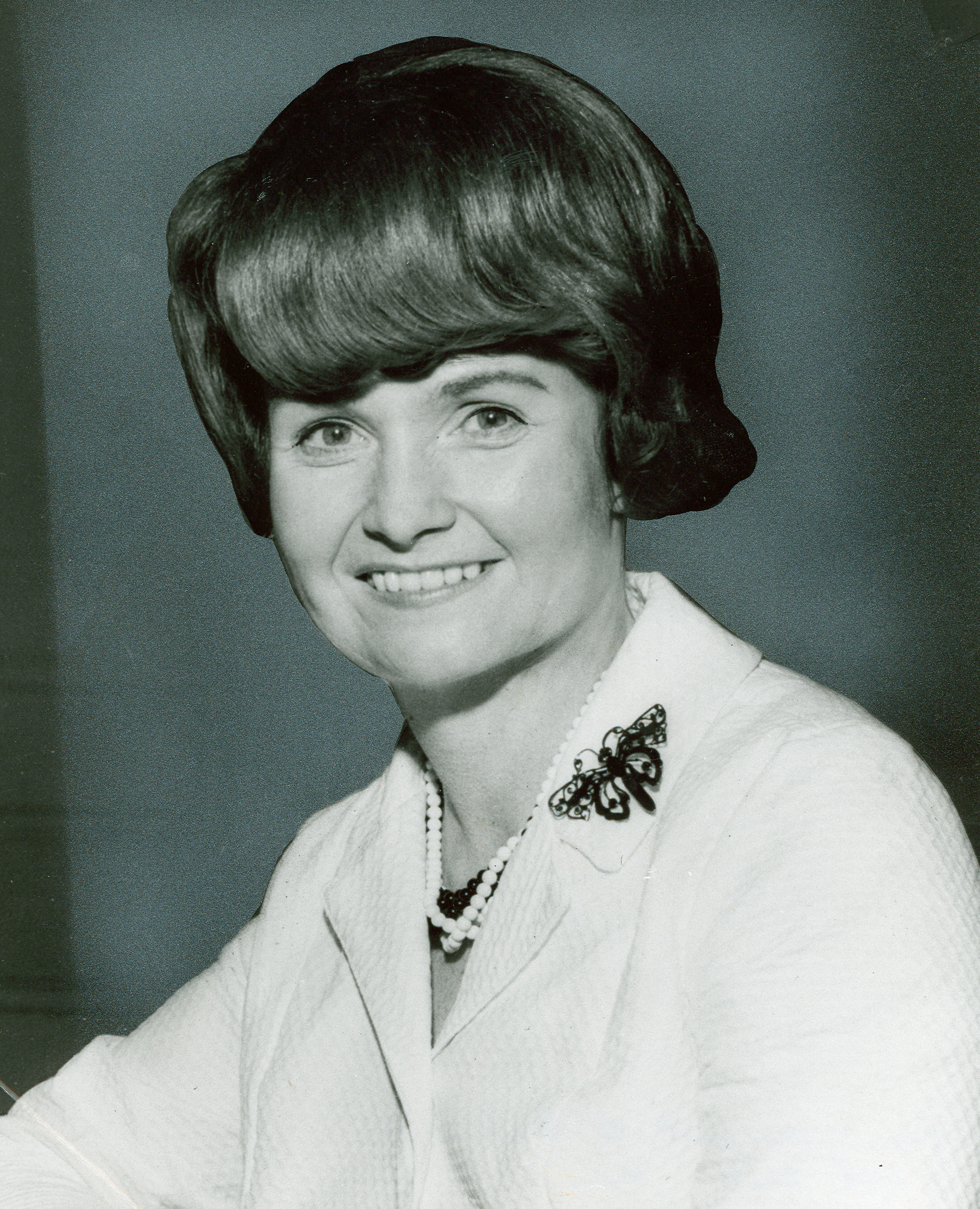
Margaret Heckler
U.S. Secretary of Health and Human Services
U.S. Representative
U.S. Ambassador to Ireland
LL.B 1956

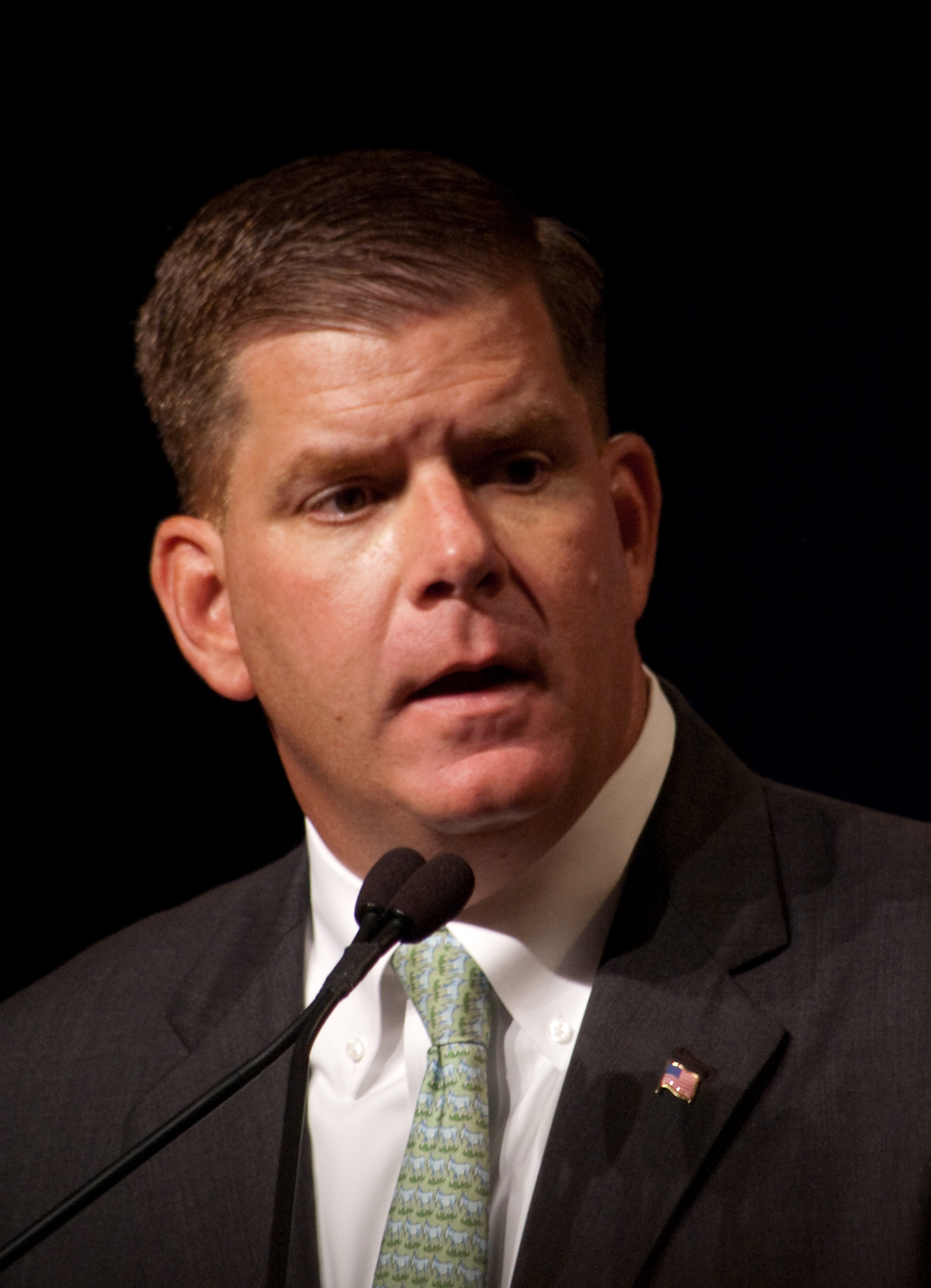
Marty Walsh
U.S. Secretary of Labor
Mayor of Boston
2009

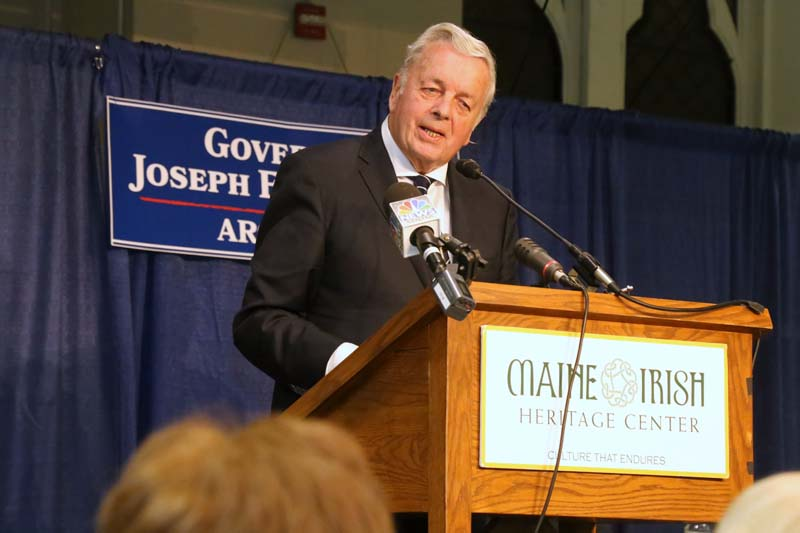
Joseph E. Brennan
70th Governor of Maine
1958

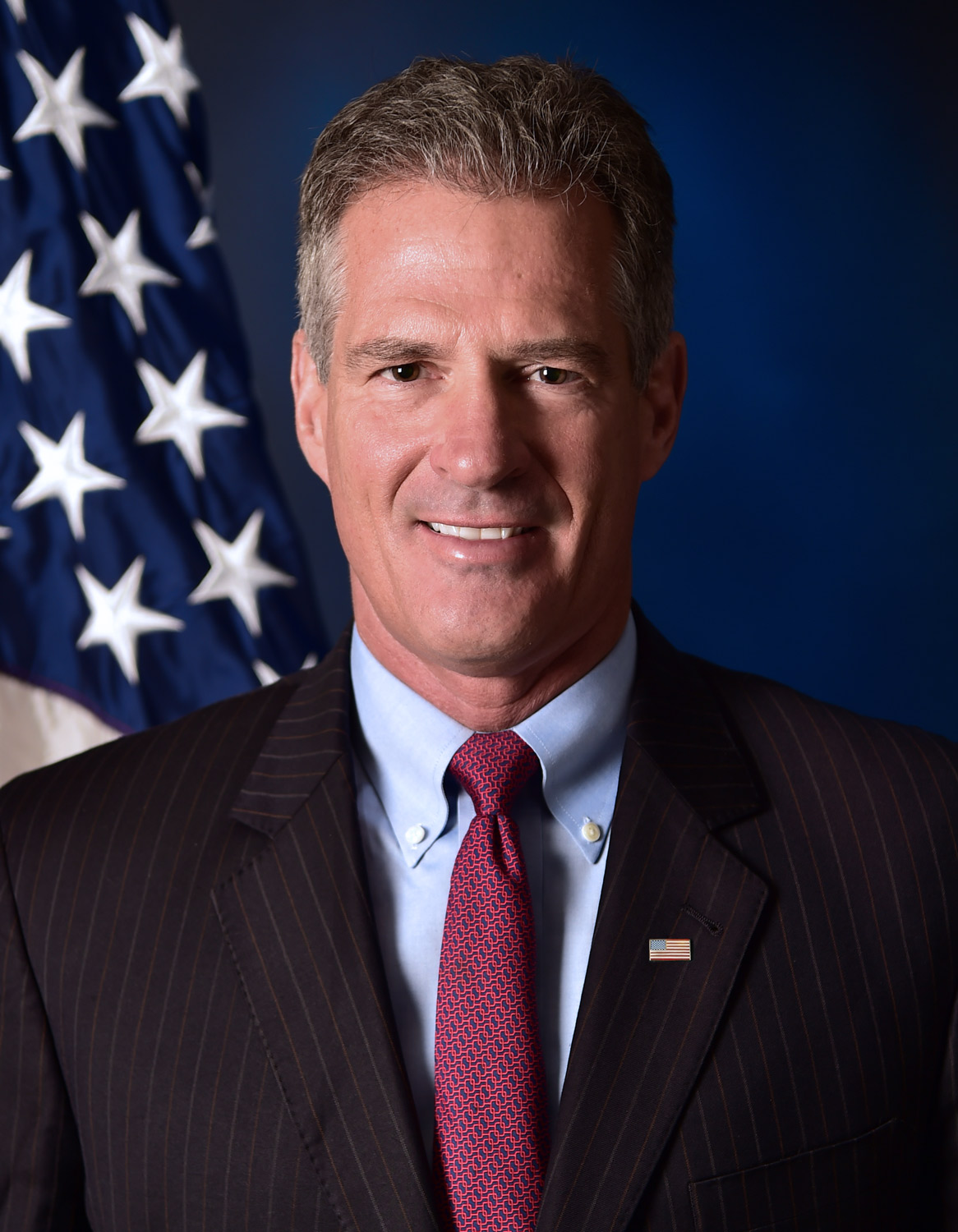
Scott Brown
Former United States Senator for Massachusetts
J.D. 1985

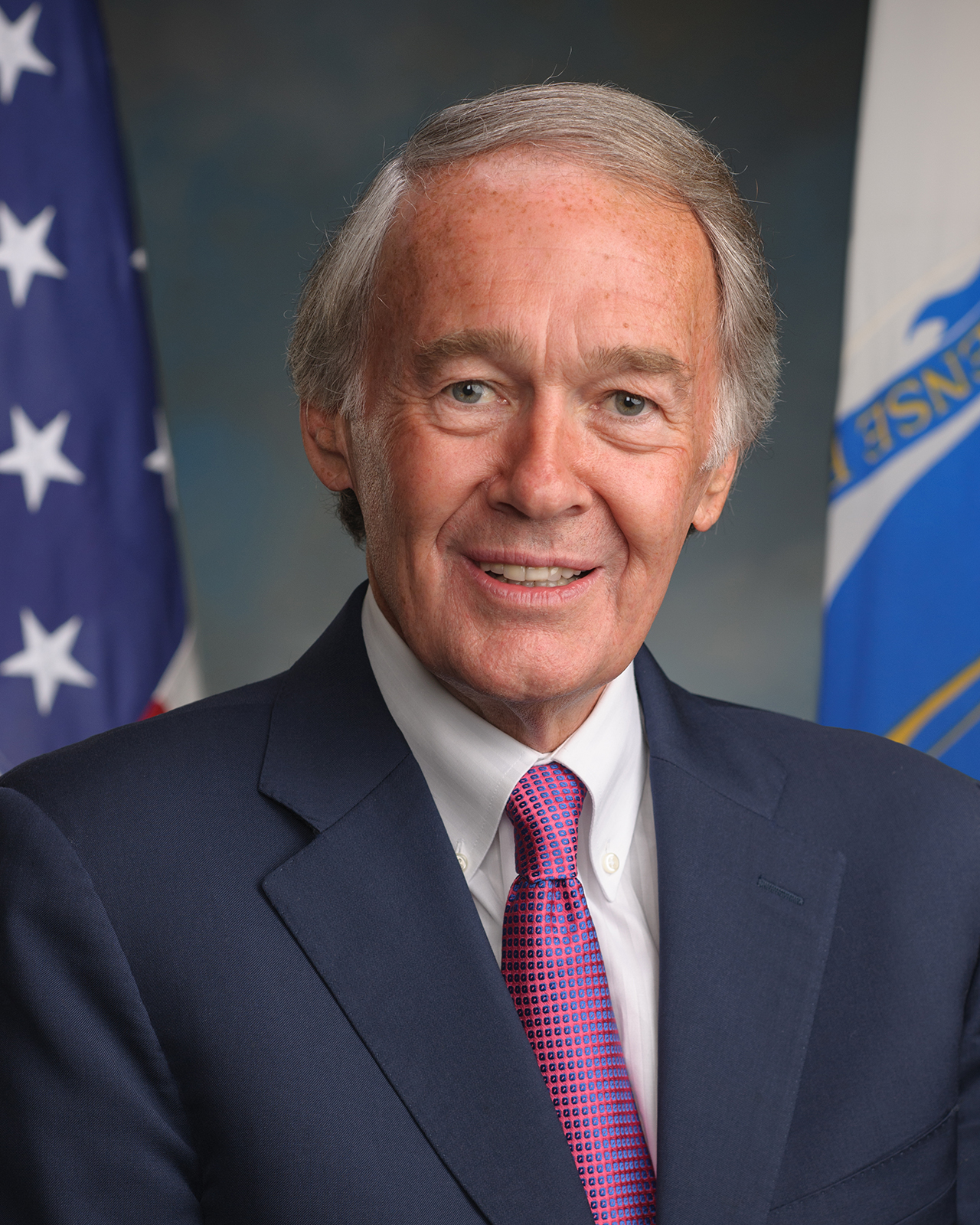
Ed Markey
United States Senator from Massachusetts
1968, J.D. 1972

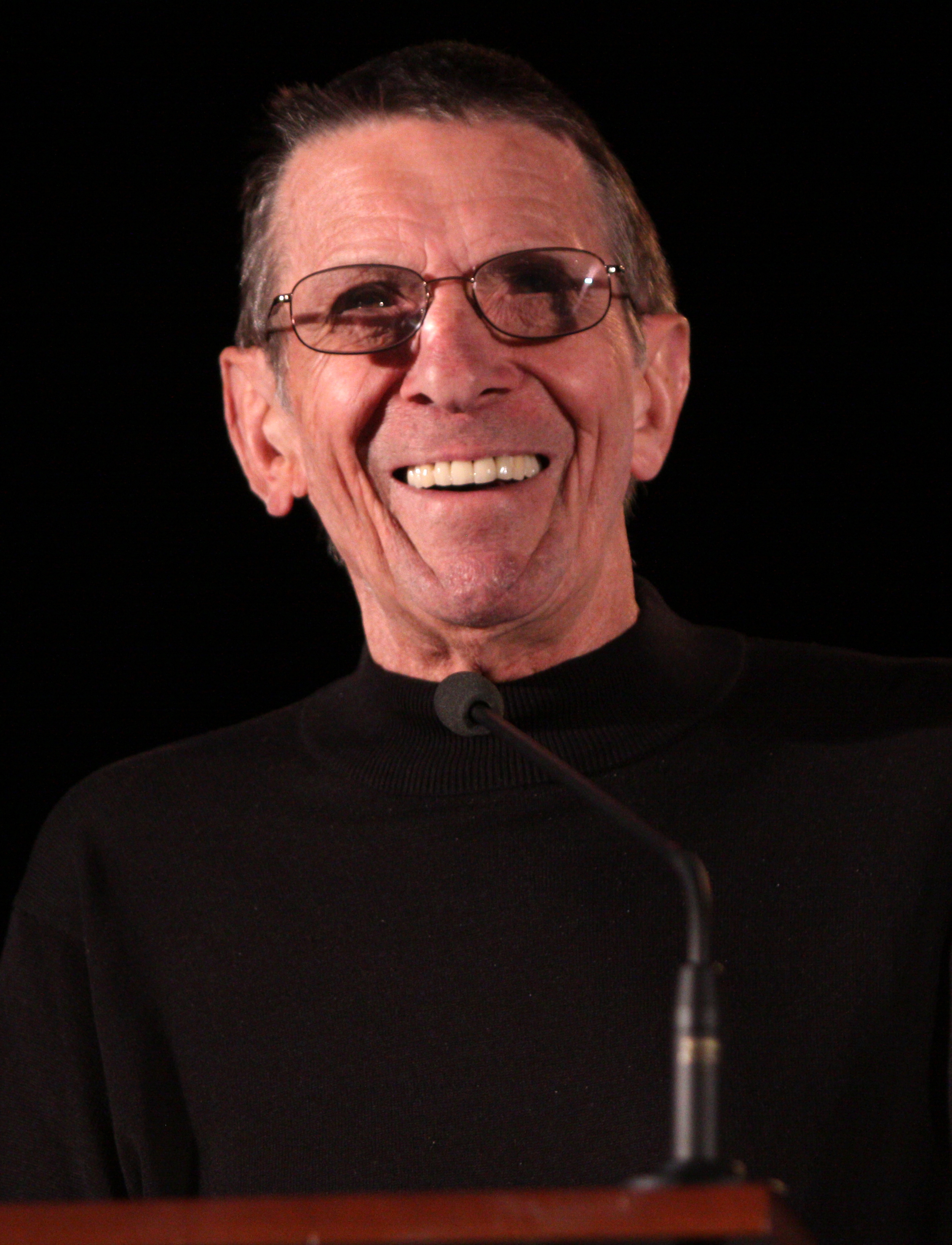
Leonard Nimoy
Actor
1952

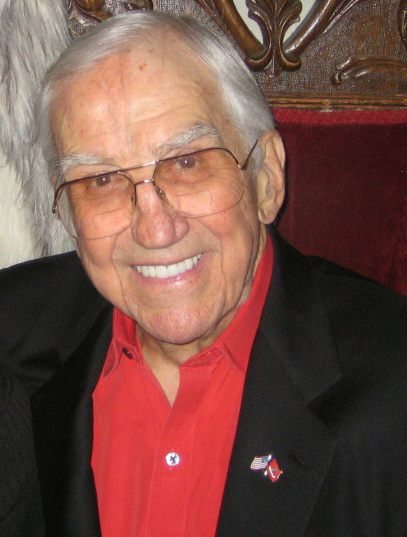
Ed McMahon
Comedian and television presenter
(Did not graduate)

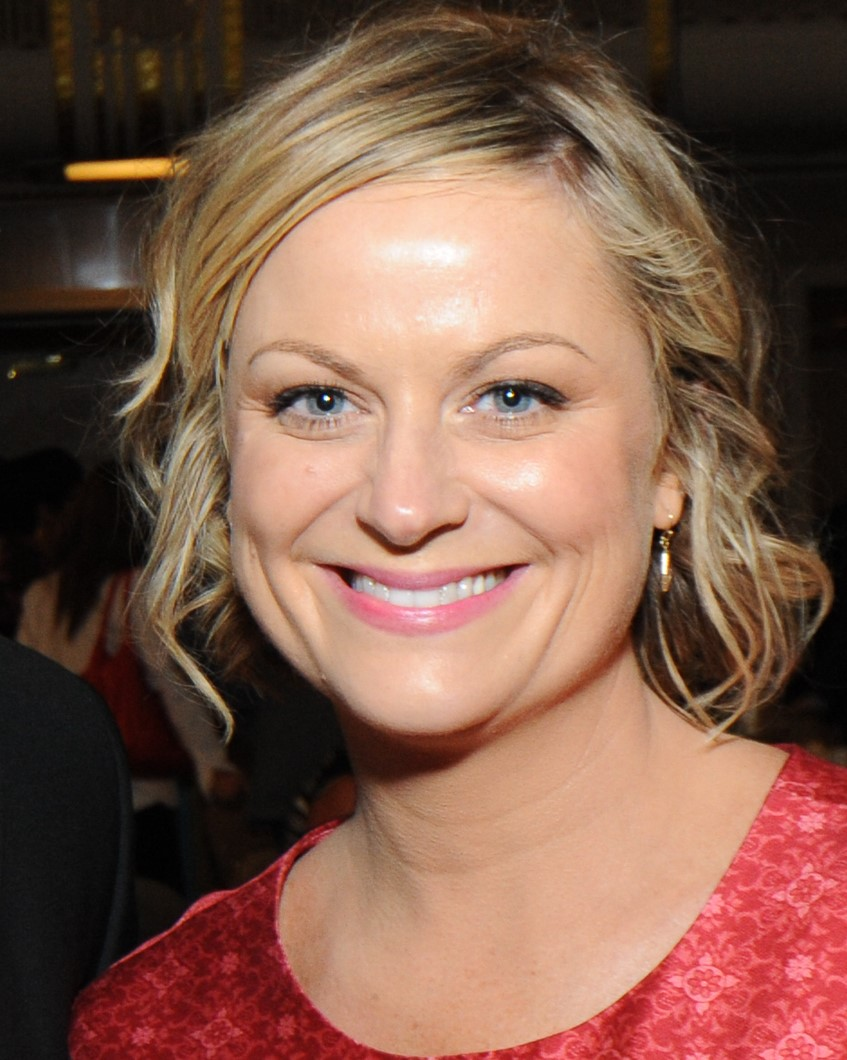
Amy Poehler
Actress and comedian
1993

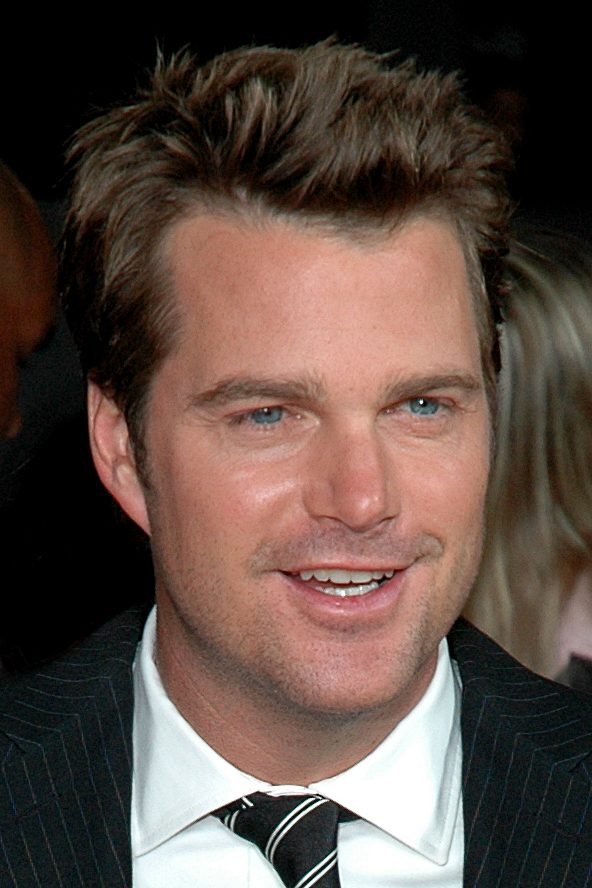
Chris O'Donnell
Actor
1992

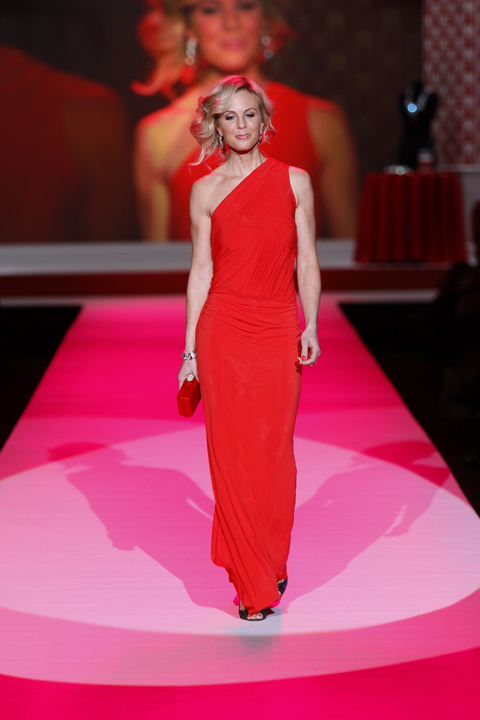
Elisabeth Hasselbeck
Television personality and talk show host
1999

== See also ==
- Hopkins House (Boston College)
- List of Jesuit sites
- List of presidents of Boston College
