= Boston College Woods College of Advancing Studies =

Constituent college of Boston College

Woods College
- Constituent college
- Boston College
- Full name: James A. Woods, S.J. College of Advancing Studies
- Established: 1929; 97 years ago
- Named for: James A. Woods, S.J.
- Former names: Boston College Intown/Evening College (1929-1996); College of Advancing Studies (1996-2002)
- Colors: Maroon and gold
- Gender: Co-educational
- Dean: David Goodman
- Undergraduates: 594
- Postgraduates: 340
- Website: bc.edu/wcas

The Boston College Woods College of Advancing Studies (WCAS) is one of the nine constituent colleges and schools of Boston College. It offers flexible undergraduate, graduate, and certificate programs, as well as non-degree coursework, for non-traditional students.

== History ==
Founded in 1929, Woods College's roots can be traced back to the establishment of Boston College Law School in the late 1920s. A "Downtown Center," which later became known as the Junior College in downtown Boston, was formed as a collaboration between the law school and Graduate School as a way to provide educational opportunities for those with only a high school diploma or the less than two years of college coursework needed to enter the law school. A special program of study was offered in the late afternoon and evening in such courses as English, accounting, economics, public speaking, modern languages, psychology, ethics, government, and sociology. Another evening program, which offered the equivalent of a four-year college course leading to a Bachelor of Arts (A.B.) degree, became known as the Extension School under the direction of the Graduate School. In September 1935, the two program merged in new quarters at 126 Newbury Street in Boston, where it became known as Intown College and later in the late 1950s, the Evening College.

In 1996, the college's name was changed from the Evening College to the College of Advancing Studies to reflect its evolving mission and expanded academic program that included both bachelor's and master's degrees.

In May 2002, the College of Advancing Studies was renamed, through a private donation with naming rights, by University trustee and businessman Robert M. Devlin and his wife Katharine B., in honor of its dean, James A. Woods, S.J., who had served since 1968 as the University's longest-ever serving dean.

== Notable alumni ==
- Marty Walsh, BA '09, Secretary of Labor.
