= Hopkins House (Boston College) =

Coordinates: 42°20′10.9″N 71°10′18.9″W

Hopkins House (Boston College) is home to the Office of Governmental & Community Affairs at Boston College. Its mission is to foster communication and positive relationships with the university's host communities of Boston and Newton, as well as all levels of government.

== Community Benefits ==
In addition to handling matters pertaining to campus development and the resolution of off-campus issues relating to student life, the Office oversees a wide range of programs that benefit the community. Notable involvements include the Community Fund, Scholarship Program, Flynn Recreation Complex Summer Program, Step Up Initiative, Food For Families, Read Aloud Program, and the Boston College/Boston Public Schools Partnership Program. These activities offer scholarship assistance to undergraduate students, continuing education benefits to municipal employees, grant funding for community-based organizations, and tutoring and literacy support for local schools.

== Flynn Recreation Complex ==
The Flynn recreation complex is named after William J. Flynn who was director of Athletics at Boston College from 1957-1991. The Flynn recreation complex is used to host thirty (30) Allston/Brighton residents per day during the summer months (June 7, 2010 – August 13, 2010) free of charge. Residents are required to register for the program through Hopkins House.
