= Yawkey Athletics Center =

Sports venue in Chestnut Hill, Massachusetts

Coordinates: 42°20′10″N 71°09′59″W

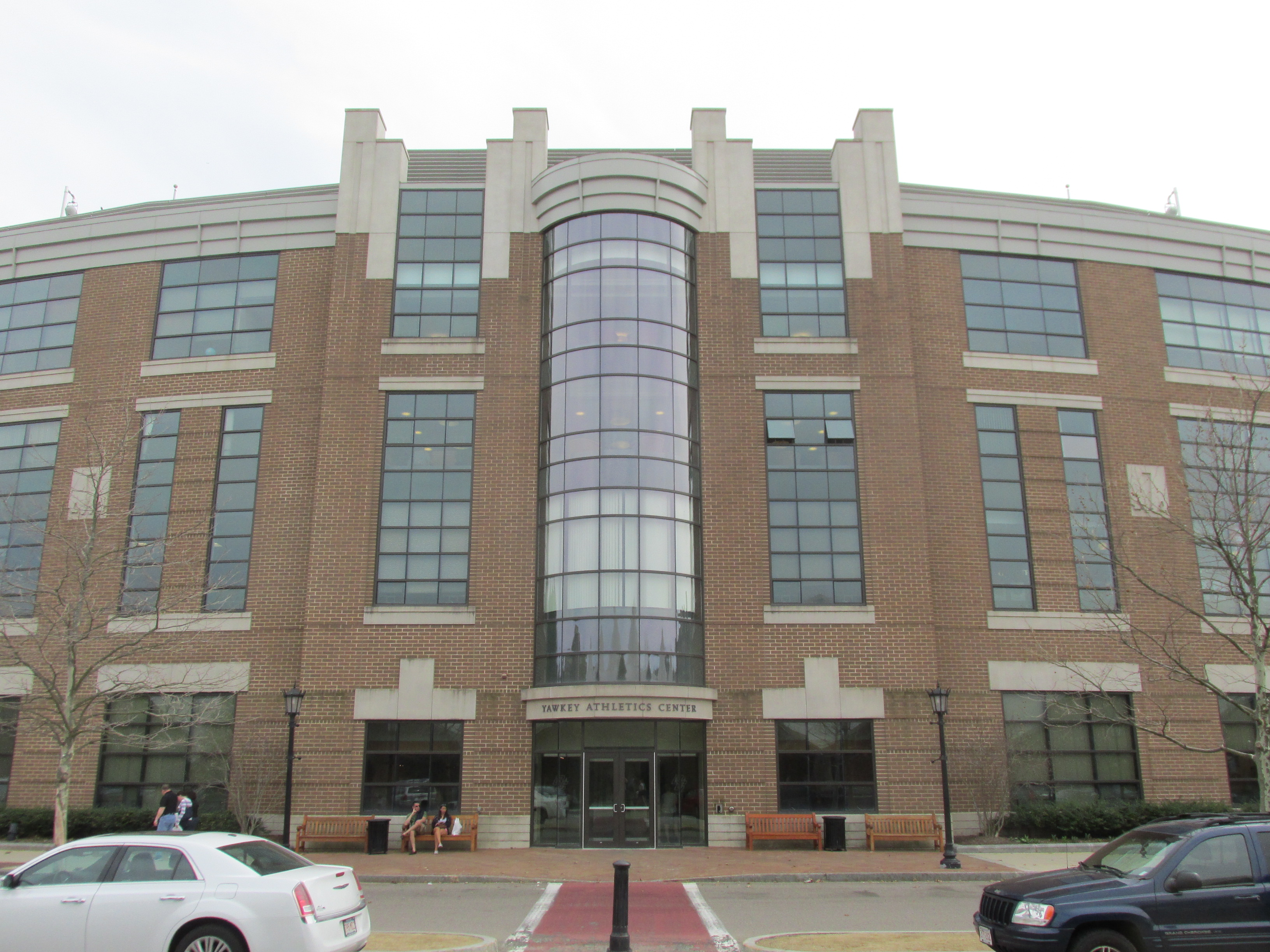
Yawkey Athletics Center

Yawkey Athletics Center is a 72,000-square-foot (6,700 m^{2}) facility located on the north end of Alumni Stadium on the Boston College campus. Opened in February 2003, it houses the football team's offices, weight room, sports medicine, and locker room. The facility also contains Learning Resources for Student-Athletes, and the Murray Room, a large function area for general University use.
