= Weston Observatory (Boston College) =

Coordinates: 42.3824°N 71.3224°W

Weston Observatory is a geophysical research laboratory of the Department of Earth and Environmental Sciences at Boston College. The Observatory is located in the town of Weston, Massachusetts, about 13 miles (21 km) west of downtown Boston.

The Observatory, which has been recording earthquakes since the 1930s, conducts research on earthquakes and related processes, delivers public information after significant earthquakes occur, contributes to earthquake awareness to help reduce the tragic effects of earthquakes, and educates.

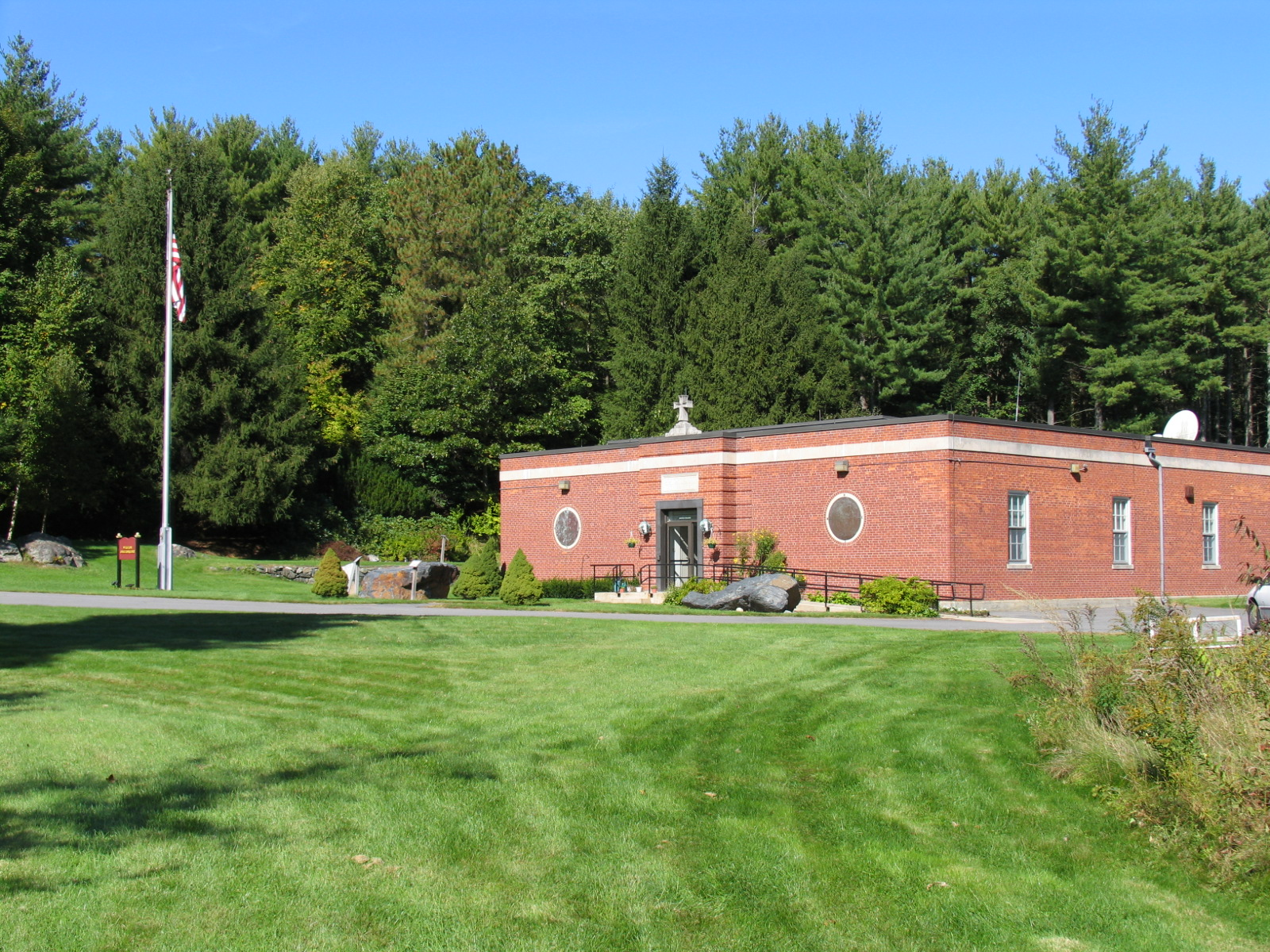
Front view of Weston Observatory.

Weston Observatory houses seismic instruments for the New England Seismic Network (NESN) and for the World-Wide Standardized Seismograph Network (WWSSN), as well as office and lab space and a geophysics library. The Observatory monitors earthquakes around the world, with emphasis on the Northeast United States (and particularly New England), disseminates information pertinent to any seismic events that are recorded, and is also a center for education and public outreach about earthquakes and related phenomena.

== History ==
The first Weston Observatory seismographs were installed at the Campion Center, next to the current Observatory, and began recording earthquakes in January 1931. The instruments were maintained by the Jesuits for many decades and were relocated to the newly built Weston College (now the Weston Observatory) in 1949. The Observatory became affiliated with Boston College in 1947 and the buildings and grounds were bought by BC in the late 1970s. The WWSSN instruments were installed late in 1961.

== Research ==
The primary focus of Weston Observatory research is on the study of earthquakes and related phenomena. Observatory scientists study earthquakes both regionally and worldwide, conduct seismic hazard analyses, and are involved in earthquake hazard mitigation studies.

=== Seismic monitoring of New England ===
Weston Observatory analyzes data from a network of 17 seismographs throughout New England called the New England Seismic Network (NESN). Most stations operate the Trillium 120PA broadband seismometer with a Reftek-147 accelerometer while others continue to operate the Guralp CMG-40T broadband seismometer. All stations have a RefTek-130 data logger that transmits ground motion data to the Observatory over the internet. Data from each NESN station, as well as data from stations in the region maintained by other agencies, is stored by Earthworm software and analyzed continuously by event detection programs. Also, seismologists at the Observatory regularly check the data and confirm reports of earthquakes either from the detection program or from reports of felt tremors from the public.

=== Geologic studies and paleobotany laboratory ===
Although the primary focus of Weston Observatory is on the study of earthquakes, other Earth Science related studies are also pursued at the Observatory. Two prominent examples are: Geologic Studies (with a focus on the Northeastern United States) and Paleobotany (the origin and early evolution of land plants).

Geologists at Weston Observatory study of the assembly and breakup of supercontinents through time, map and analyze the regional geology of selected localities in terranes surrounding the Atlantic Ocean. Having been at an active plate margin millions of years ago, the Northeastern United States has very complex geology. Weston Observatory scientists study the local geology of southern New England and have published a number of books about the local geology, including: Roadside Geology of Massachusetts and Roadside Geology of Connecticut and Rhode Island.

The Paleobotany Laboratory at Weston Observatory is engaged in research on the origin and early evolution of land plants based on fossil spores from lower Paleozoic rocks from around the world.

== Science education and public outreach ==
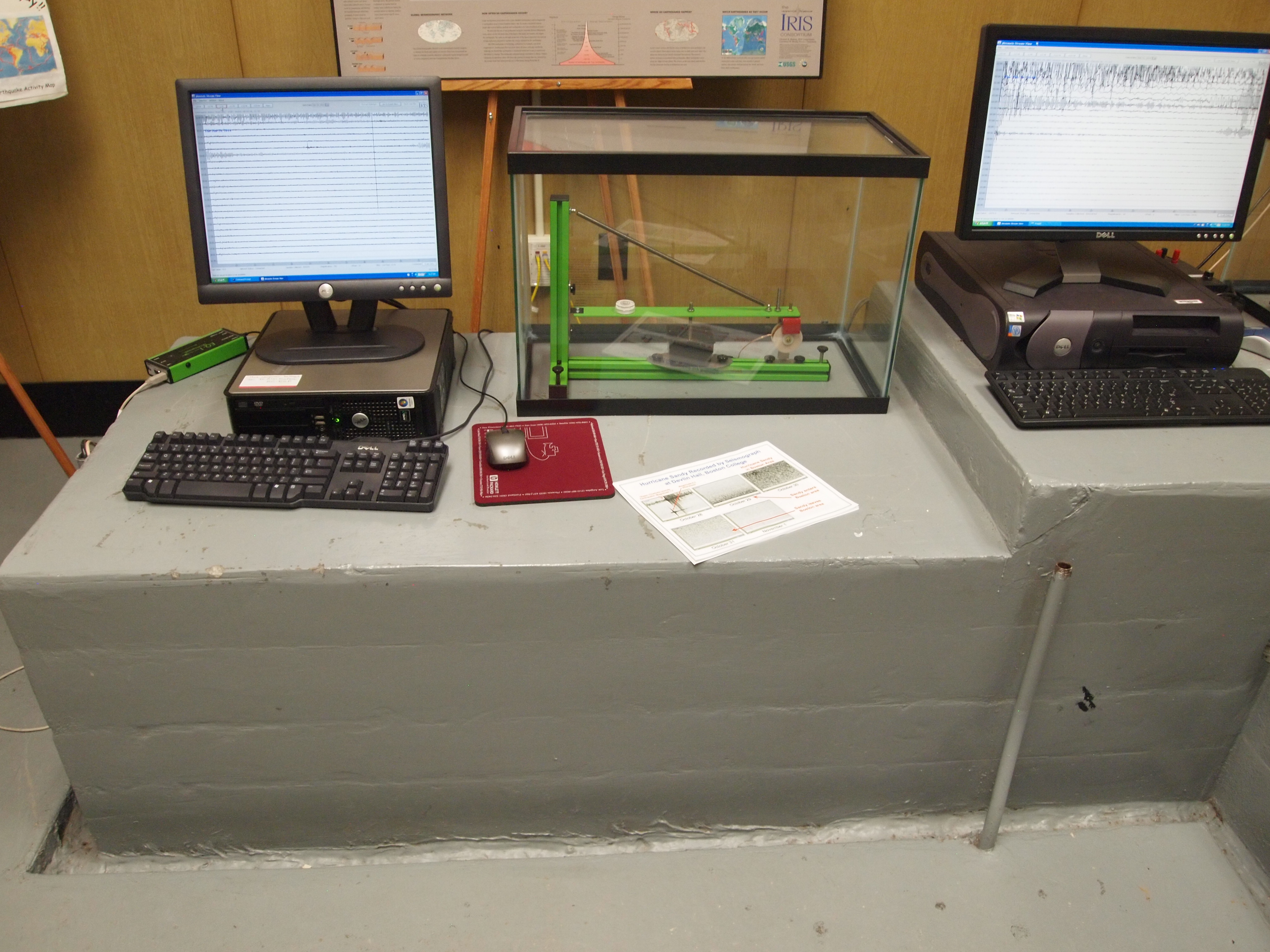
Seismometer and other instruments for science education and public outreach.

The broader mission of Weston Observatory is to integrate seismology research with science education and public outreach, focusing on earthquakes and related phenomena.

Weston Observatory operates the Boston College Educational Seismology Project (BC-ESP). The BC-ESP began as a program to operate seismographs in K-12 schools, and based on those classroom seismographs, it continues to provide educational enrichment for students of all ages, using seismology as a medium for a broad-based science education program. BC-ESP has now expanded to include public libraries.
