= Boston College Main Campus Historic District =

Historic district in Massachusetts, United States

Coordinates: 42°20′15.46″N 71°10′17.54″W

- U.S. National Register of Historic Places
- U.S. Historic district
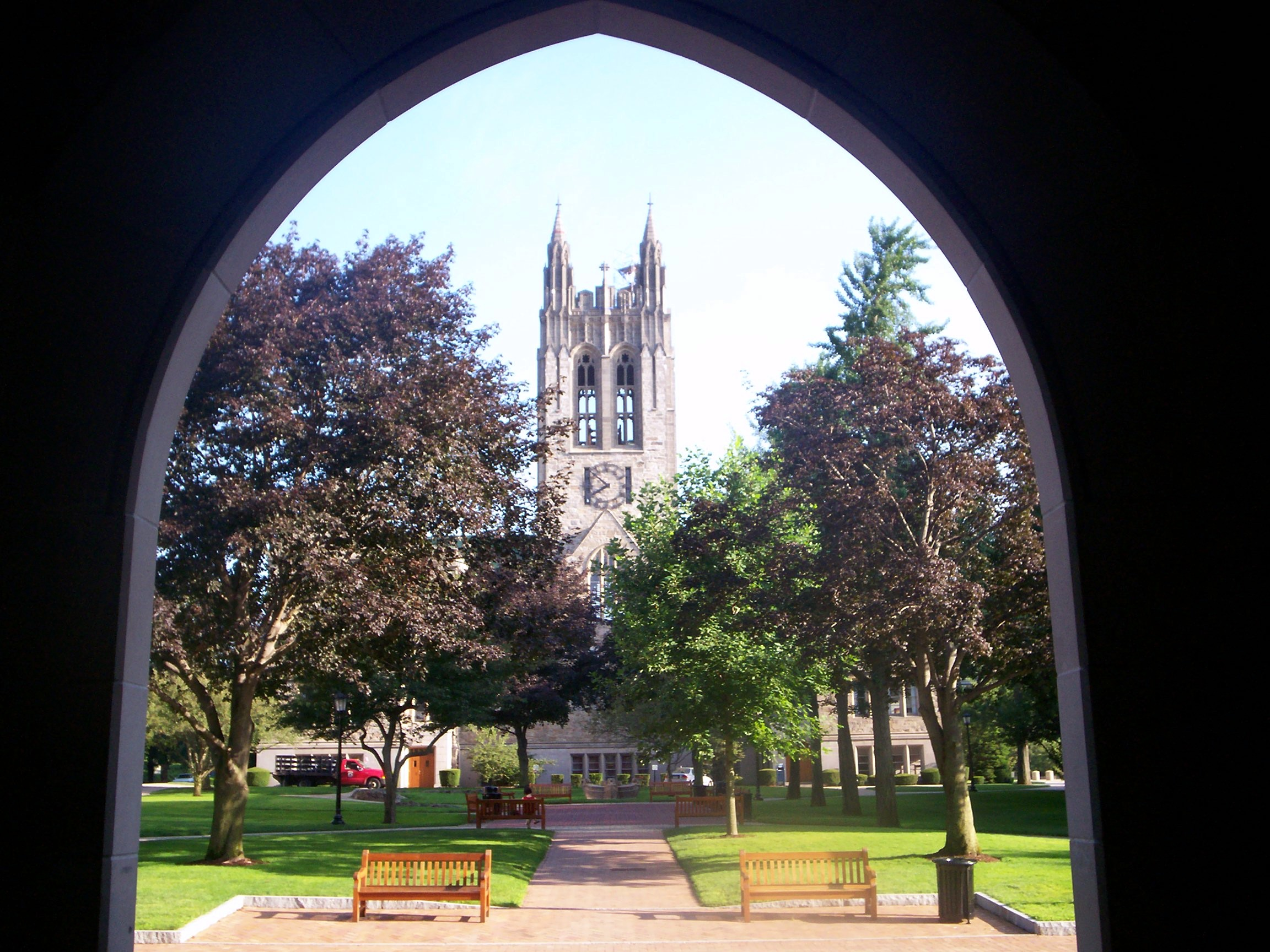
- Gasson from Fulton

- Location within Massachusetts Location within the United States
- Location: 140 Commonwealth Ave., Chestnut Hill; Newton, Massachusetts
- Built: 1913
- Architect: Charles D. Maginnis
- MPS: Newton MRA
- NRHP reference No.: 90000109
- Added to NRHP: January 9, 1990

Boston College Main Campus Historic District encompasses the historic heart of the campus of Boston College in the Chestnut Hill area of Newton, Massachusetts. It consists of a collection of six Gothic Revival stone buildings, centered on Gasson Hall, designed by Charles Donagh Maginnis and begun in 1909.

The district has been ambiguously listed in the National Park Service's NRIS database (the official repository for listings on the National Register of Historic Places) as "pending" since January 9, 1990.

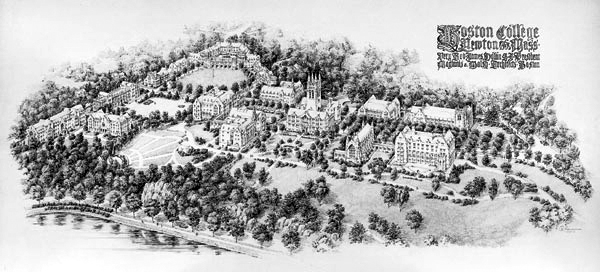
The Maginnis master plan

== See also ==
- National Register of Historic Places listings in Newton, Massachusetts
