= Boston College School of Social Work =

Coordinates: 42.3337°N 71.1696°W

School of Social Work
- Private school of social work
- Boston College
- Location: Chestnut Hill, Massachusetts, U.S.
- Full name: Boston College School of Social Work
- Abbreviation: BCSSW
- Founders: Walter McGuinn, S.J. Dorothy L. Book
- Established: 1936; 90 years ago
- Colors: Maroon and gold
- Gender: Co-educational
- Dean: Gautam N. Yadama
- Postgraduates: 565
- Website: bc.edu/ssw

The Boston College School of Social Work (BCSSW) is the graduate school of social work at Boston College in Chestnut Hill, Massachusetts.

== History ==
The School of Social Work was founded in 1936 by Walter McGuinn, S.J., who held a Ph.D. from Fordham University, and Dorothy L. Book, an experienced social worker. McGuinn, a faculty member, petitioned both the Society of Jesus in Rome and Cardinal William Henry O'Connell of Boston for permission to open a social work program with a focus on Catholic philosophy and ethics. McGuinn served as the school's first dean.

Classes began in September 1936 at the university's downtown Boston building at 126 Newbury Street, with an enrollment of 40 students and a distinguished faculty of experts from the field. The school's curriculum included both studies about the foundations of social work and hands-on experience with social work agencies. Two years later, the first class graduated and the school received its accreditation from the American Association of Schools of Social Work on June 28, 1938.

In 1943, Book followed McGuinn as dean, becoming the first woman dean at Boston College. She served until 1955. In 1979, the school began offering a Doctor of Social Work degree, which later was changed to a Doctor of Philosophy in Social Work. The school in September 1968 moved to the Chestnut Hill campus's McGuinn Hall, which is named for McGuinn and his brother, Rev. Albert McGuinn, S.J., who headed the chemistry department.

== Academics ==
The School of Social Work offers two professional degrees: Masters of Social Work and Doctor of Social Work, as well as several dual degrees. In addition, a Latinx Leadership Initiative (LLI) trains social work leaders to work with the Latino community.

== Centers, labs and institutes ==
The School of Social Work's research centers, labs, and institutes are renowned for conducting groundbreaking work and providing critical services.

The Center for Social Innovation promotes "innovation from within." The mission is to foster effective, sustainable social innovations that enhance social justice.

The Immigrant Integration Lab is an applied research lab exploring the intersection of social work, social policy, and immigrant inclusion.

The Center on Aging & Work focuses its research on helping the business community promote workplace flexibility and prepare for the opportunities and challenges associated with an aging workforce.

Research in Social, Economic, and Environmental Equity (RISE3) is an interdisciplinary initiative that convenes researchers from Boston College and practitioners and policymakers from around the world to address social, economic, and environmental inequality and confront issues of race, place, and poverty.

The Research Program on Children and Adversity (RPCA) investigates risk and resilience in children facing multiple forms of adversity using qualitative and quantitative research methods. RPCA works to develop feasible interventions that support positive life outcomes.

The Cell to Society Lab merges neuroscience and social work, examining neuroimaging studies of at-risk children and teenagers to understand the impact of social context on brain development.

== Social Work Library ==
The Social Work Library contains 20,000 books and a collection of e-books, major journals, and databases.

== See also ==
List of social work schools
