= Michael Shute =

Canadian scholar (1951–2020)

- Born: 21 September 1951
- Died: January 3, 2020 (aged 68); Halifax, Nova Scotia

Academic background
- Education: Acadia University; Atlantic School of Theology; Regis College, Toronto
- Thesis: The Origins of Lonergan's Notions of the Dialectic of History (1991)
- Doctoral advisor: Robert M. Doran
- Influences: Bernard Lonergan

Academic work
- Discipline: Religious studies
- Sub-discipline: Social ethics; legal theory; economic theory; theological aesthetics
- Institutions: Memorial University of Newfoundland

Michael R. Shute (21 September 1951 - 3 January 2020 in Halifax, Nova Scotia) was a Canadian scholar and Professor of Religious Studies at Memorial University of Newfoundland. He was known for his research on the works of Bernard Lonergan and moral decision-making. Shute was a co-editor of Journal of Macrodynamic Analysis.

Shute received a diagnosis of ALS. As a result, he retired from teaching in September 2019, and died on January 3, 2020.

== Books ==
- Lonergan's Discovery of the Science of Economics, University of Toronto Press, 2010
- Lonergan's Early Economic Research, University of Toronto Press, 2010
- Improving Moral Decision-Making (with William Zanardi). Axial Press, 2003
- The Origins of Lonergan's Notion of the Dialectic of History, University Press of America, 1993
