= Richard Liddy =

Catholic priest, professor, and university director

Monsignor Richard Liddy (born 1938) is a Catholic priest, professor and director of the Center for Catholic Studies at Seton Hall University. He is also the director of the Bernard J. Lonergan Institute and editor of The Lonergan Review, which promote the philosophical teachings of Bernard J. Lonergan. He has authored the books Startling Strangeness: Reading Lonergan's Insight, Transforming Light: Intellectual Conversion in the Early Longergan, and In God's Gentle Arms.

== See also ==
- Seton Hall University
- Bernard J. Lonergan
- The Lonergan Review
