= Lonergan's Discovery of the Science of Economics =

- Authors: Michael Shute
- Language: English
- Subject: Bernard Lonergan
- Publisher: University of Toronto Press
- Publication date: 2010
- Publication place: United States
- Media type: Print (hardcover)
- Pages: 320
- ISBN: 978-1-4426-4091-7

Lonergan's Discovery of the Science of Economics is a 2010 book by Michael Shute, in which the author provides an account of Bernard Lonergan's solution to a fundamental problem in economic theory.
