= The Origins of Lonergan's Notion of the Dialectic of History =

1993 book by Michael Shute

The Origins of Lonergan's Notion of the Dialectic of History: A Study of Lonergan's Early Writings on History
- Authors: Michael Shute
- Language: English
- Subject: Philosophy of history
- Publisher: University Press of America
- Publication date: 1993
- Publication place: United States
- Media type: Print (hardcover)
- Pages: 232
- ISBN: 978-0-8191-8838-0

The Origins of Lonergan's Notion of the Dialectic of History: A Study of Lonergan's Early Writings on History is a 1993 book by Michael Shute, in which the author provides "a study of previously unavailable material from the 1930s on the subject of history by Bernard Lonergan".
