= Marcelle Corneille =

Canadian administrator and educator (1923–2019)

- Born: January 27, 1923; Montreal, Quebec, Canada
- Died: January 3, 2019 (aged 95); Montreal, Quebec, Canada
- Education: Université de Montréal
- Occupations: Administrator; Educator
- Years active: 1949–2019

Marcelle Corneille (January 27, 1923 – January 3, 2019) was a Canadian administrator and educator in the field of music education. She taught at the Université de Montréal-affiliated École normale de musique from 1949 to 1976 and served as its director from 1957. Corneille founded the Université du Québec à Montréal's (UQAM) music module and was its director until 1978, as well as establishing the École Préparatoire de Musique de l'UQAM in 1976. She also taught at Sir George Williams University and its successor Concordia University and the Thomas More Institute, lectured at events and contributed to musical periodicals. A room in UQAM's Department of Music was named to recognize her legacy at the institution.

== Early life and education ==
Marcelle Corneille was born on June 27, 1923, in Montreal, Quebec. She was the daughter of a French mother called Rachel Maertens and a Belgian father named Armand Corneille. Marcelle had two siblings. At the age of five, she started to play the piano. Corneille earned a Bachelor's degree in music from the Université de Montréal in 1952, and subsequently a pedagogy degree from the Notre Dame Normal School in 1960.

== Career ==
In 1943, Corneille joined the order of the Sisters of the Congregation of Notre-Dame. She garnered an interest in the music-education methods developed by Émile Jaques-Dalcroze, Zoltán Kodály, Ondes Martenot and Carl Orff, and went on to study their methods in Europe and the United States. Starting from 1949, she began teaching at the Université de Montréal-affiliated École normale de musique and was appointed its director in 1957. When Corneille was asked by the Congregation of Notre-Dame to form a program for kindergarten-aged children at the Institut pédagogique, she lobbied those pedagogies to encourage children's development of their musical abilities and visited Europe on multiple occasions to work with the teachers whose methods she had learnt. She also worked with Georges Little, the leader of the newly formed Ministry of Education, and was on the committee of the Ministry of Music Education in 1964 to promote music education programs in mainstream education. Corneille also contributed to the Commission of Inquiry on Arts Education in the Province of Quebec in 1966, the year it was founded as a result of the Parent Report. She was a member of the Quebec Provincial Committee on Music Education and an executive member of the Quebec Music Educators Association.

In 1969, she founded the Université du Québec à Montréal's (UQAM) music module and directed it until 1978. From 1971 to 1973, Corneille served as vice-president of Fédération des associations de musiciens éducateurs du Québec (FAMEQ) as one of its founding members, and established the École Préparatoire de Musique de l'UQAM in 1976 to provide a music education service to the community in the style of Orff. She was the inspiration of the formation of the UQAM Choir in 1978. Corneille taught music education at Sir George Williams University and its successor Concordia University and the Thomas More Institute. She was a contributor to multiple periodicals, including L'École between 1965 and 1969 and EMC, gave lectures to the Kodály symposia in 1973, 1975 and 1977, as well as at the Canadian Association for Music Therapy convention in 1977 and the Congress of ISME the following year. In 1989, Corneille was appointed professor emeritus by UQAM in its department of music. She was made an honorary member of FAMEQ in 2006.

== Personal life ==
Cornielle died at Résidence Bon-Secours, Montreal, on January 3, 2019, at the age of 95. On the morning of January 10, she was given a funeral at Montreal's Notre-Dame-de-Grâce Church.

== Personality and legacy ==
Cornielle was passionate about children, was devoted and intelligent. According to Actualités UQAM, she "had a major impact on the training of professional musicians, but also on the teaching of music in Quebec." In early 2018, a music room in the UQAM's Department of Music was named "Salle Marcelle-Corneille" in recognition of her legacy at the institution.
