= Philip McShane =

Irish philosopher and mathematician (1932–2020)

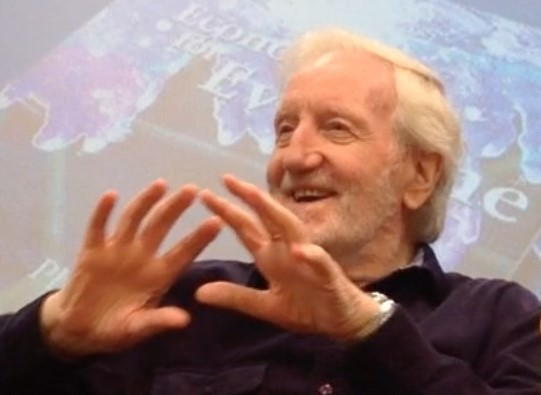
- University of British Columbia, July 2014
- Born: Philip Joseph McShane; 18 February 1932; Bailieborough, County Cavan, Ireland
- Died: 1 July 2020 (aged 88); Vancouver, British Columbia, Canada
- Education: University College Dublin (Bachelor of Science); Heythrop College (S.T.L.); Oxford University (D.Phil)
- Scientific career
- Fields: mathematical physics, evolutionary theory, economics, methodology, theology
- Thesis: The Concrete Logic of Discovery of Statistical Science
- Website: https://philipmcshane.org/

Philip McShane (18 February 1932 – 1 July 2020) was an Irish mathematician and philosopher-theologian. Originally trained in mathematics, mathematical physics, and chemistry in the 1950s, he went on to study philosophy from 1956 to 1959. In 1960, after teaching mathematical physics, engineering, and commerce to undergraduates and special relativity and differential equations to graduate students, McShane began studying theology. He did his fourth year of theology in 1963 and in 1968 began reading economics.

In a period that spanned over sixty years, McShane published numerous articles and twenty-five books. His publications range from technical works on the foundations of mathematics, probability theory, evolutionary process, and omnidisciplinary methodology, to introductory texts focusing on critical thinking, linguistics, and economics. He also wrote essays on the philosophy of education. Beginning in 1970, he participated in and helped organize a number of international workshops and conferences addressing topics such as "ongoing collaboration," reforms in education, and communicating the basic insights of two-flow economics.

Two Festschrift volumes were published to honor McShane, one in 2003 and the second in 2022. In the first, eighteen individuals contributed essays, and, at the request of the editor, McShane submitted an essay as well. He also replied to the eighteen contributors in the essay "Our Journaling Lonelinesses: A Response.” In the second Festschrift, twenty-four individuals wrote essays remembering and honoring McShane, who was nominated for the Templeton Prize in 2011 and 2015.

== Life and education ==
McShane was born in Baileboro, County Cavan. When the McShane family moved to Dublin, Philip went to O'Connell School. He continued his education while training as a Jesuit at University College Dublin (BSc and MSc in relativity theory and quantum mechanics), St Stanislaus College, Tullabeg (Lic. Phil), Heythrop College (STL) and Campion Hall, Oxford (D.Phil.). He lectured in mathematics at University College Dublin (1959-1960) and in Philosophy at the Milltown Institute of Theology and Philosophy (1968-1973).

McShane entered the Jesuits in September 1950 and spent two years in spiritual formation. In 1952, in spite of having "acquired a 'broken head,' which meant he was unable to study, or even to do any serious reading, he was also allowed to risk a very challenging programme of mathematics, mathematical physics, physics and chemistry." Eleven years later, after completing a B.Sc., an M.Sc. in relativity theory and quantum mechanics, and a Licentiate of Philosophy, he was ordained a Jesuit priest.

In 1956, McShane "shifted from graduate studies of mathematics and physics that included such works as the classic Space-Time Structure by Erwin Schrödinger," and embarked on what would be a lifelong venture of reading and appropriating the works of Bernard Lonergan, initially through a careful study of Lonergan's Verbum articles, followed by a startling study Insight. In the years that followed, he co-authored (with Garret Barden) Towards: Self-Meaning and wrote Music That Is Soundless. In the mid-1960s, he studied at Oxford University, where in August 1969 he successfully defended his doctoral thesis "The Concrete Logic of Discovery of Statistical Science," which soon after was published as Randomness, Statistics, and Emergence. After the First International Lonergan Conference in Florida 1970, McShane took on the task of editing two volumes of the papers presented at that event. In 1972, he decided to leave the Jesuits.

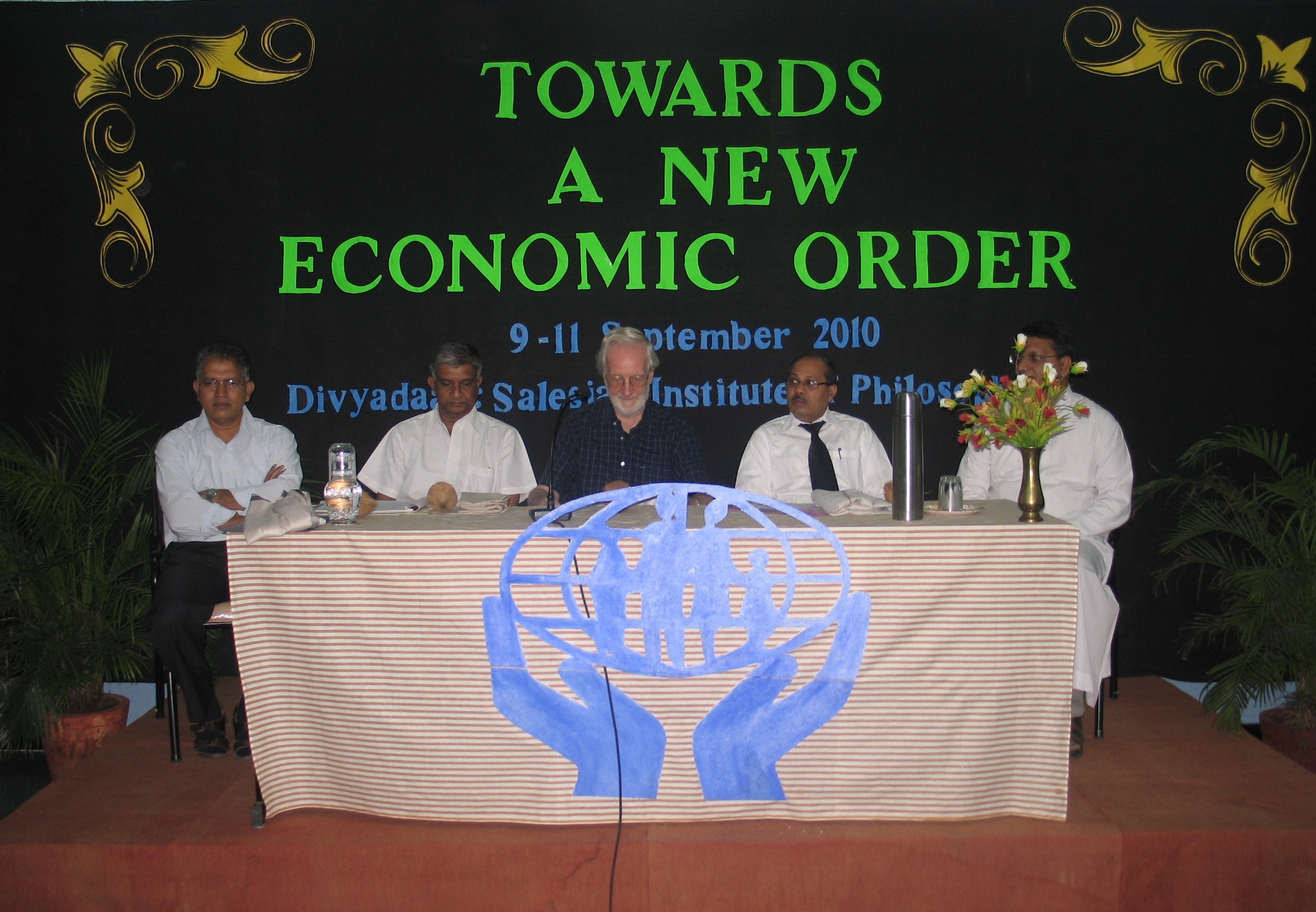
"Towards a New Economic Order," Nashik, India, September 2010

In 1975, along with Conn O'Donovan, McShane founded the Dublin Lonergan Centre, in Milltown Park, Dublin. In 1979, he served as visiting fellow in religious studies at Lonergan College, Concordia University, Montreal. In his course, McShane encouraged students to work through the exercises in his introductory book Wealth of Self and Wealth of Nations. From 1974 until 1994, McShane taught philosophy at Mount Saint Vincent University, Halifax, Nova Scotia. When he retired from teaching in 1995, he began writing prolifically. After retiring, McShane also accepted invitations to speak at international conferences and workshops. He gave keynote addresses at gatherings in Asia, Australia, Europe, North America, and South America.

In the last years of his life, McShane wrote about the negative Anthropocene age in which we live and a future positive Anthropocene age of luminous collaboration. In Questing2020, his final series of essays, he wrote of the possibility of human collaboration mirroring the psychic adaptation of starling murmuration. When McShane died in July 2020, colleagues and former students around the globe paid tribute to him. A theologian from Africa described him as akin to an "African elder," another as someone who "gave counsel to think long-term, in terms of centuries rather than years or even decades," and a third as "someone I could always be myself around, even when I was angsty, anxious, or depressed … a friend, mentor, professor, and family member all at once." A former student described "being amazed, when I asked him some questions, at his generosity—he tore out a chapter of something he was working on and gave it to me there and then."

== Influences ==
By his own account, McShane was humbled as a young man by the works of Chopin and fortunate to have discovered Descartes' achievement in geometry. He wrote about "the luck of working with Lochlainn O'Raifeartaigh in graduate studies of mathematical physics in the mid-fifties." He also studied and had a keen appreciation for Richard Feynman's Lectures on Physics, especially the third lecture. McShane was fond of and often quoted the poetry of Gerard Manley Hopkins, Rainer Maria Rilke, and Patrick Kavanaugh. "Having music in his genes," he often referred to particular pieces of music. For example, the quiet emergence of five notes that grow to dominate Bruckner's 8th symphony was symbolic for him of the slow emergence of effective global collaborartion. "Bruckner's 8th has been symbolic for me of the climb to effective functional scientific collaboration: a five note echo trickling in at the beginning of the second movement and finally taking over the symphony: so, we trickle in at, we hope, the beginning of the second movement of the Anthropocene."

In his "story of history," McShane referred to the works of Karl Jaspers, Arnold Toynbee, and Eric Voegelin and identified an axial period of "fragmented consciousness, a transition between what Lonergan calls the two times of the temporal subject." There are references to the teachings of the Buddha, the music of Beethoven, and the works of James Clerk Maxwell in Bernard Lonergan: His Life and Leading Ideas. In an essay written for a conference on peaceful coexistence, he cited Elizabeth Barrett Browning's "Aurora Leigh" and William Shakespeare's Henry IV, and referred to Archimedes' "leap of inventiveness" when he created a hydrodynamic screw to raise water. In the same essay, he referred to Ezra Pound's image of a vortex as symbolic of a global community "committed to a science of cosmic care ... redeeming time from the mad destructive greed of the 'civilized' majority of the present global population."

Various women influenced and shaped McShane's worldview. His extensive writings on the "Interior Lighthouse" were inspired by Teresa of Ávila's Interior Castle. McShane resonated with the English novelist and poet Mary Ann Evans, who went by the name of Georg Eliot. He regularly cited this line from the middle of Eliot's Middlemarch: "If we had a keen vision and feeling of all ordinary human life, it would be like hearing the grass grow and the squirrel’s heart beat, and we should die of that roar which is the other side of silence. As it is, the quickest of us walk about well-wadded with stupidity.” McShane cited more than a dozen times the lyrics of songs on Sinead O'Connor's album Faith and Courage in Lonergan's Standard Model of Effective Global Inquiry. His appreciation and admiration of greatness extended to the performances of Serena Williams and Venus Williams on the tennis court, the lifework of Nadia Boulanger, who was very much on McShane's mind when he wrote Process in the late 1980s, and to “Molly Bloom’s long Gospel-speech,” which McShane cited time and again. In his writings on economics, he regularly cited the British economist Joan Robinson, who was well known for her disagreement with standard economics, especially American economics. He also referred to the work of Jane Jacobs, with whom he corresponded.

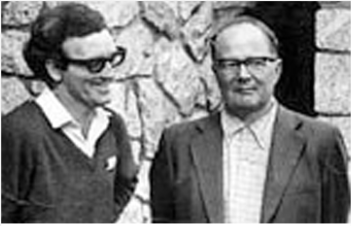
McShane and Lonergan at the Milltown Institute, Dublin, in 1971.

In a lecture introducing the economic analysis of Lonergan at Fordham University in January 2000, McShane quoted Stephen McKenna. When McKenna discovered the writings of Plotinus in his late 30s, he pondered the possibility of translating The Enneads from Greek into English and decided "this is worth a life." It could be said that McShane made a similar decision when he discovered the works of Bernard Lonergan. He described the "central contribution" of his doctoral thesis in these terms: "It is an attempt to establish on a wider basis of contemporary mathematics and science the position of B. Lonergan on the nature of randomness, statistics, and emergence." Thirty years after completing his thesis, McShane edited for publication Lonergan's economic manuscript For a New Political Economy, and two years later Phenomenology and Logic: The Boston College Lectures on Mathematical Logic and Existentialism. He regularly referred to the final two chapters of the latter as a resource for trying to identify and come to grips with both the ontic and phyletic aspects of the "existential gap."

For more than 60 years, McShane diligently read and reread Insight: A Study of Human Understanding, and is arguably the leading interpreter of this compendious work. In the essay "Insight and the Trivialization of History," he described having been "enormously fortunate in coming to Insight in 1957 after graduate studies in general relativity and quantum electrodynamics." In 2011, McShane was recognized for his contributions to Lonergan studies at the West Coast Methods Institute's 26th Annual Fallon Memorial Lonergan Symposium at Loyola Marymount University.

== Capacities, needs, and interests ==
=== Towards an Adequate Weltanschauung ===
The cultivation of an adequate worldview was a focus of McShane's early writings, and remained so throughout his life, although in the later years of his life he would write of Praxisweltanschauung. In his rather peculiar doctoral thesis, McShane aimed to reorient the philosophy of science away from general considerations towards a reflection on scientific praxis, again, through a two-fold attention of the mathematician, physicist, biophysicist, and biochemist. He claimed that the world view "emergent probability" is a verifiable, anticipatory heuristic that is not "abstract" in the pejorative sense of the word.

The Weltanschauung thus given is not a set of abstract propositions or a speculative metaphysics, but a structured anticipation. Moreover, that anticipation may not be the methodical anticipation of the results of just one science, but an integrated anticipation of the results of a hierarchy of sciences, such indeed as our inclusive principle of emergent probability provides.

Regarding the publication of his Oxford doctoral thesis, McShane wrote that "the book might well have been subtitled Towards an Adequate Weltanschauung." This claim might appear odd, even exaggerated, given the questions he dealt with in his thesis—ostensibly specialized questions in the philosophy of math, physics, biophysics, and biochemistry. McShane's position, stated in the original preface, is that a viewpoint on the relationship of physics to chemistry and chemistry to botany is part of an adequate worldview. "Without that thought one lacks a basic component for the conception of world process. The present work deals with the central element and the heuristic conception of world process."

In Music That Is Soundless (1969), he wrote about what he considered a core component of a comprehensive worldview: our human capacity and need for conversations, or what he called "Bud A," a "bud in our birth that clamours in solitude." The book is an invitation to attend to "the conversation that we are" (Hölderlin) by asking self-attentively: "When was I last understanding, understood? When did I last speak? When did I last listen?

At the heart of McShane's worldview is the idea of human capacity and need for a particular doubling. He taught that humans were capable of having conversations about conversations, while asking what happens when we are truly understanding, listening, and speaking. He believed that patient contemplation could lead to a better understanding of understanding, a better listening to listening, and a better speaking of speaking. Regarding the basic question, "When was my last real conversation?" he posited that "one may honestly find that one has little or no data," especially if cultural conditions are not favorable to real conversations: "Ten thousand people, maybe more / People talking without speaking / People hearing without listening."

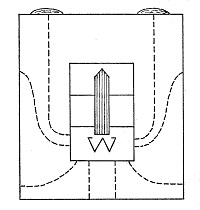
"The Inside-Out of Radical Existentialism," chapter 5 of Wealth of Self and Wealth of Nations.

In the introductory book Wealth of Self and Wealth of Nations (1975), the double focus took the form of an invitation to appropriate, in as much detail as possible, the "inner" dynamics of the process of understanding why, for example, the rule for getting square roots actually works. McShane included some simple diagrams in this book to help the reader appropriate, or "self-taste," what-ing (chapters 2 and 3), is-ing (chapters 4 and 5), what-to-do-ing (chapter 6), believing (chapter 7), symbolizing conveniently and judiciously (chapter 8), and exploring potentialities for living through the arts (chapter 9). In the final chapter of this book, McShane made the remarkable claim that a change of framework, or point of view, is both possible and desirable if humans are to survive. But there is a Catch-22: "The need for change in point of view is thoroughly clear only from a changed point of view."

In the Epilogue to Music That Is Soundless, McShane wrote that "to raise with seriousness the question, What is understanding? is to venture into a quest of scientific dimensions." What 'scientific dimensions' meant to him in 1968 was mediated by his study of relativity theory and quantum mechanics at University College, Dublin (1952–56). In both his doctoral thesis and "Image and Emergence: Towards and Adequate Weltanschauung" (one of two papers he wrote for an international congress that took place in Florida in 1970), McShane was traveling along what he would later call "Butterfield Way."

=== The study of organic development ===
Organic development had been a topic of interest for McShane in the 1960s, and in fact was a possible topic of his thesis. "I recall especially wanting to see could I lift the biological logic of someone like Woodger into a full genetic logic." What he knew would have been a "lengthy aside" in the doctoral thesis, became one of his central interests around 2005, when he took a serious interest in development, in part because of Robert Doran's question "What is systematic theology?" In the spring of 2008, McShane decided to write a series of essays to better read a single paragraph in Insight about three steps for studying organic development. A first step is to descriptively differentiate different parts of an organism; a second step is to accumulate a group of insights relating various parts to events and operations; and

a third step is to effect the transition from the thing-for-us to the thing-itself, from insights that grasp described parts as organs to insights that grasp conjugate forms systematizing otherwise coincidental manifold of chemical and physical processes. By this transition one links physiology with biochemistry and biophysics. To this end, there have to be invented appropriate symbolic images of the relevant chemical and physical processes.

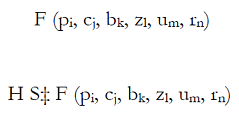
Wealth of Self and Wealth of Nations (2nd ed., 2021), p. 91.

McShane identified the three-step procedure for studying organic development as perhaps the most obscure challenge for scholars with an interest in the works of Lonergan. He would add to the obscure challenge by adding the word self to the sentence to highlight the starting point of a study of the developing human: "Self-study of an organism begins from the thing-for-us, from the organism as exhibited to our senses." He referred to the need to bring the study of human development under heuristic control as "a missing link."

In Interpretation from A to Z (2020), McShane was still focused on the methodological study of organic development. The central problem was and is the genesis of a genetic viewpoint that will replace "daft reductionism that chatters away about genes and information theory." In this, the last book published in his lifetime, he referred to the challenge as "the up-grading of Aristotle, whose flaw is merely his time in history." In chapter "J ~ Inventing Techniques," he wrote that the invention and implementation of convenient and appropriate symbolic images is "the honest starting place of a genuine science of humanity," an "issue that has to be faced in the contemporary reality" of what he called aggreformism, a word he coined in 1969 to refer to a sublation of Aristotelian hylemorphism. The contemporary need is to create an ethos of inventing convenient symbols and reading, for example, the semicolons in the expression f (p_{i} ; c_{j} ; b_{k} ; z_{i} ; u_{m} ; r_{n}) or another appropriate symbolic expression. In either case, the symbolism protects those studying development from "substituting pseudo-metaphysical mythmaking for scientific inquiry." McShane wrote that "the semicolons point to the complex solution to the root problem hierarchy theory—aggreformism—a problem that baffles the systems theorists—when they notice it—and the followers of Bertalanffy."

=== Two-flow economics ===
In 1968 McShane began reading Lonergan's 1944 manuscript "Essay in Circulation Analysis" and made his first attempt to present the material in the summer of 1977. By his own account, he "estimated that [he] had spent twenty hours on each page of the manuscript over a period of about five years." On various occasions and in various countries—including Australia, Canada, India, Korea, Mexico, and the U.S.—he presented the key issues underlying the significant transition from the Marxist, neo-Marxist, Keynesian, and neo-Keynesian analyses to an empirically verifiable analysis. In January 2000, McShane gave a series of lectures on Lonergan's economics at Fordham University's Lincoln Center campus in New York City. Ten years later, he was invited to give the keynote address and lead discussions at a three-day conference on economic theory in Nashik, India.

In his published works on economics, McShane explored different facets of what he called “a triple paradigm shift in economic thinking” that he attributed to Lonergan. One shift is to a theory of two-flow dynamic analysis that will replace one-flow static analysis. With a bow to Schumpeter, McShane identified this shift as “a theory of economics dynamics that definitely crosses the Rubicon.” A second shift is to an emerging framework of global collaboration that, in good time, will subsume all disciplines, all fields of study. The third shift is “towards a deep and precise plumbing of the depths and heights of human desire and imagination.”

McShane drew the following analogy to identify the shift to two-flow economics. Newton reached for a theory of motion that would unify the physics earthly motions and celestial bodies, something that was beyond both Kepler and Galileo. In a sense, he reduced two types of motion to one. The leap to two-flow economics is one that does not reduce, but differentiates, for example between the consumption of a submarine sandwich bought at the local delicatessen and the “consumption” of the meat slicer used to make the sandwich. “Instead of Newton’s great leap to get two into one, we have a great leap of getting one into two.”

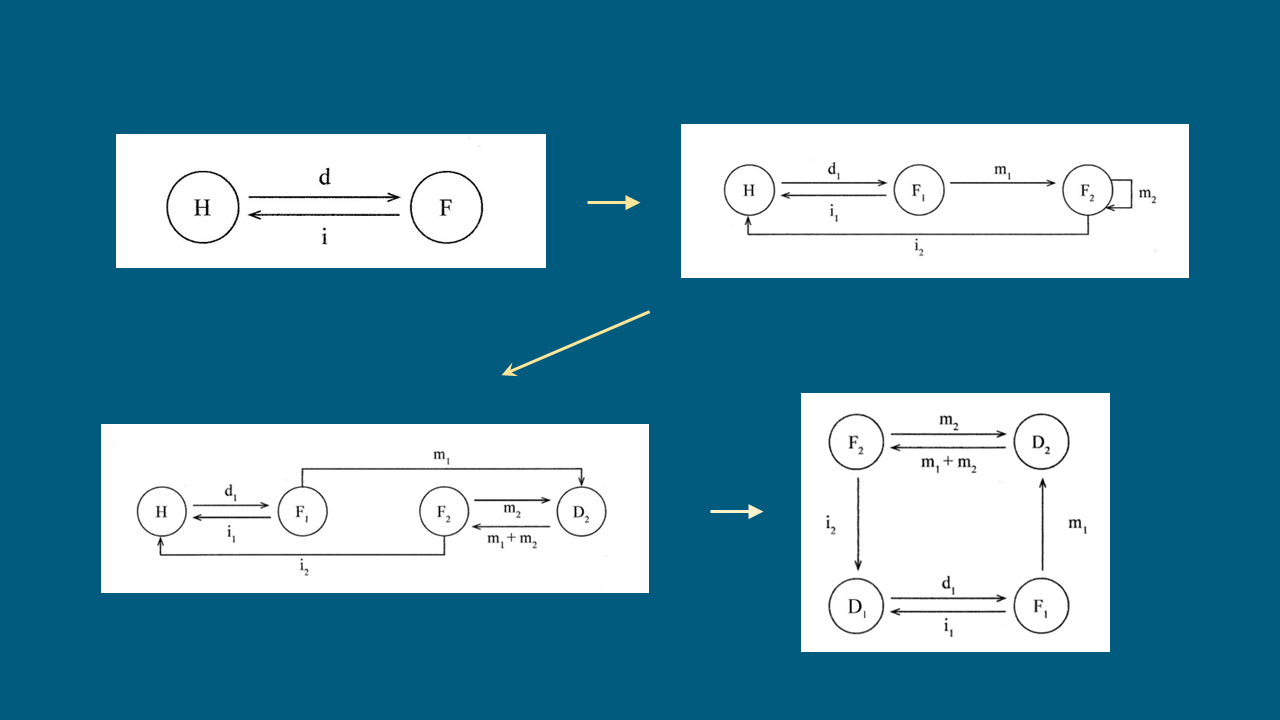
The Key Diagrams: From One-Flow to Two-Flow Economics.

The basic oversight that permeates the current study and implementation of economic models is the failure to identify a split in the productive process, one that needs to be made before adding variables such as banks, taxes, and international trading. “There is a type of firm that is pregnant with consumer goods: think of the restaurants in Chinatown or Little Italy. There is also the type of firm that is in the business of providing, say, varieties of large cooking ovens in restaurants all over the borough.” Melding two firms into one has been institutionalized by publishers, research universities, and even papal initiatives over a period of more than 200 years. McShane refers to this as “a staleness of perspective and a settled non-scientific attitude that has haunted economic studies for centuries.” He claimed that the perspective and attitude haunts the diligent research of Thomas Piketty and James Galbraith, as “the drive represented by these and other groups who hover round the issue of inequality of income is not sufficiently scientific in its classificatory backing to escape my extremely odd view that their efforts do not escape the category of statistically-infested journalism.”

McShane's view is that the search for new data to cast light on old questions—for example, whether new inequality metrics are needed and how inequality of household incomes might be estimated—must clear-headedly and consistently keep in mind “the fact that there are two types of firms, a simple local analysis that nevertheless leads to there being pretty well two of everything.” Without identifying two-firms, different phases of economic development, and the possibility of dynamically balanced cross-over payments between two distinct economic circuits, intimations of improvements in standards of living without economics slumps tend to sound like pie in the sky, while analyses of national and transnational exchanges tend to be “grossly unhelpful.”

== Towards efficient global collaboration ==
=== An emergent need to "Turn to the Idea" ===
In various writings, McShane cited the work of Arnie Næss, the father of “deep ecology.” In 1989, while in Oxford writing Process: Introducing Themselves to Young (Christian) Minders, “detecting, leaning into India, of history’s effort to educate us, I was astonished to find his [Næss's] detecting of a parallel structure of cosmic deliberation.” Thirty years later, while writing “Structuring the Reach Towards the Future” for The 3rd Peaceful Coexistence Colloquium in Helsinki, Finland (June 2019), he returned to Naess's work for the first time since he had read it thirty years earlier in Oxford.

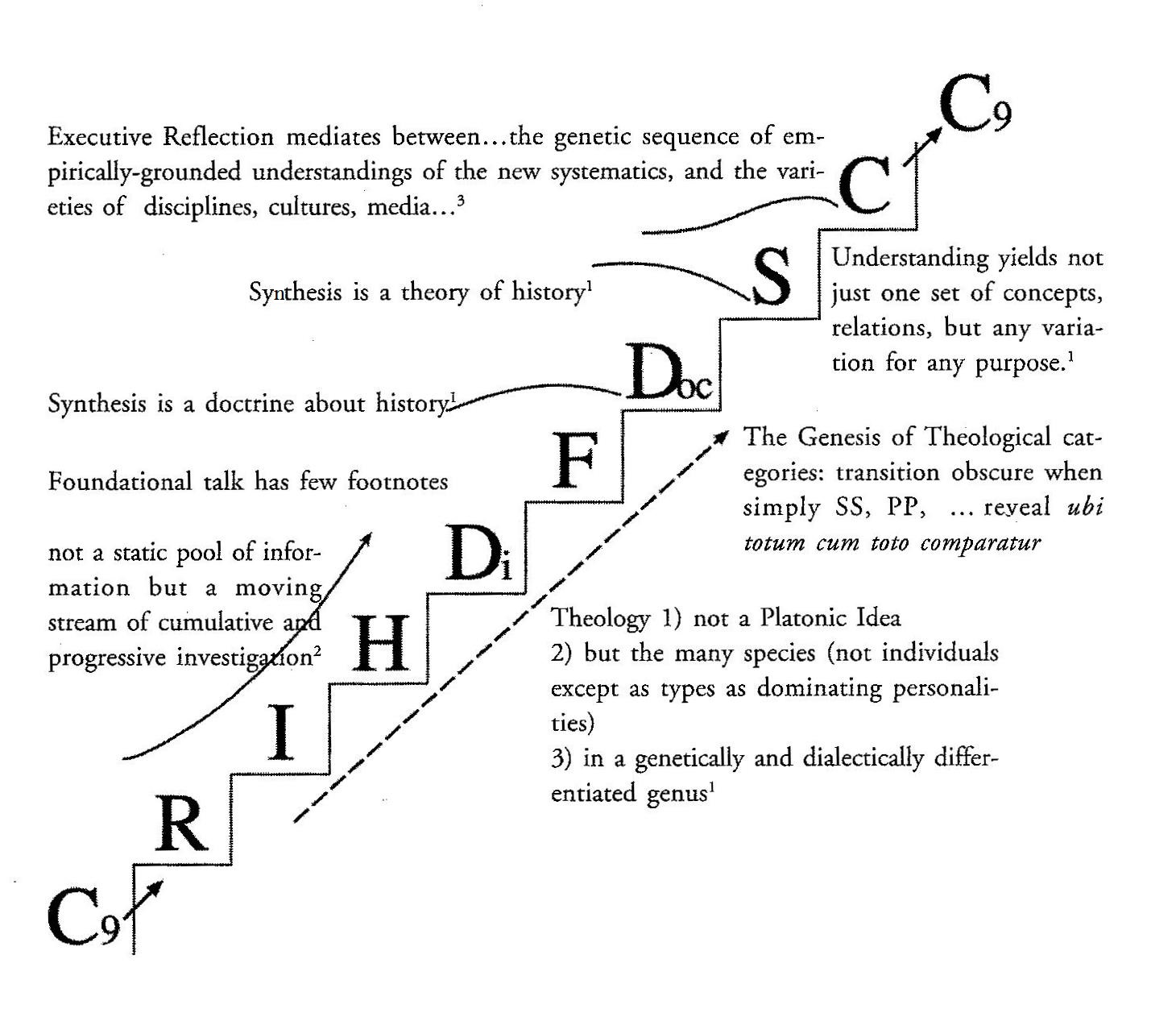
The stair diagram. Interpretation from A to Z, p. 20.

McShane maintained that Næss was on to something, for example, when he wrote: “Applied to humans, the complexity-not-complication principle favours division of labour, not fragmentation of labour.” The challenge is to discover and implement a way to intervene effectively in intertwined cycles of natural-historical processes. The web of intertwined processes currently presents humans of all colors and creeds with a myriad of challenges that include biodiversity loss and species extinction, water scarcity, unemployment, and children’s health and education. It is no mean problem if one is mindful of the needed restart in economics, not to mention other areas in need of reformation such as education.

Beginning in the late 1960s, McShane wrote about this “turn to the idea” of dividing up labor, citing the influence of Bernard Lonergan, who also wrote about dividing up intellectual labor after puzzling about how that might be done efficiently for more than thirty years. In Method in Theology, after briefly describing a conception of method as an art and second conception of method as a successful science, where “science means natural science” and “theologians often have to be content if their subject is included in a list not of sciences but of academic disciplines,” he described the needed “turn to the idea” of efficient collaboration in these words: “Some third way, then, must be found and, even though it is difficult and laborious, that price must be paid if the less successful subject is not to remain a mediocrity or slip into decadence and desuetude.”

The idea is to divide up the labor of caring for the cosmos “functionally,” so not along the lines of disciplinary silos, but along the lines of “distinct and separable stages in a single process from data to ultimate results.” The various stages, steps, or specializations are essentially open and reciprocally dependent successive partial contributions to communicating to “the almost endlessly varied sensibilities, mentalities, interests, and tastes of [humankind].”

McShane wrote about the needed turn sketched by Lonergan's in the 1969 Gregorianum article in various works. In chapter 5 of The Allure of the Compelling Genius of History, he compared Lonergan's breakthrough discovery to the invention of Hedy Lamarr of a torpedo-guidance system, a system which depended on what she called “frequency hopping.” “In that chapter [5], an article of 1969, Lonergan came ‘to invent a fundamental wireless technology,’^{†} which will slowly come to thrive in post-modern technologies of guidance and communication.”

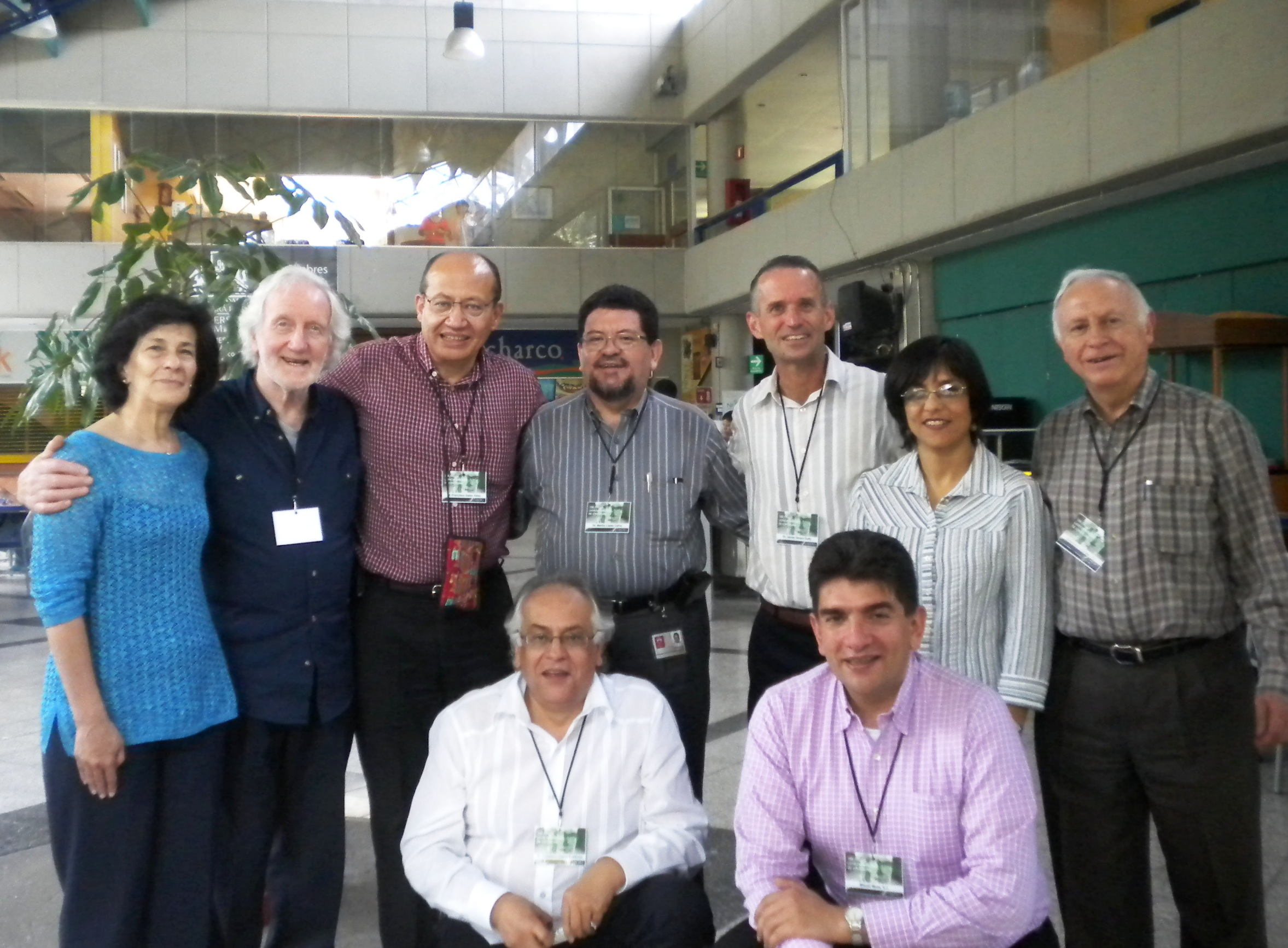
"Educating for Cosmopolis," First Latin-American Lonergan Workshop, Puebla, Mexico, June 2011

One of McShane’s contributions to implementing transdiciplinary collaboration was to identify disciplinary “sloping.” In the essay "Slopes: An Encounter," he wrote that "as the disciplines move up from research through interpretation to history and to dialectic, there is a convergence of data and interest." He wrote the following about Lonergan's breakthrough to restructuring of theology, indeed of all areas of study—a point that Karl Rahner caught and made against those who might claim the prescribed eightfold division of labor is strictly theological method:

Now he had found it, so to speak, on a string, in a String Theory of the Cosmos of meaning. The scattered beads of disciplinary sweat could be seen now as strung together sweetly. The jumble of theology’s fragmented areas – Scripture studies, doctrines, history, dialectical and pastoral scholarship – strung together in a circle of eight handing-round efforts.

In his keynote address “Arriving in Cosmopolis,” which McShane wrote for the First Latin-American Lonergan Workshop in Puebla, Mexico, June 2011, he estimated the numbers of specialists—identified by Lonergan as researchers, interpreters, historians, dialecticians, foundational (persons), doctrines or policy (makers), systematizers, and communicators—efficiently collaborating around the globe when the earth's total population reaches 10 billion. In the same essay, he placed what is called the Standard Model in physics within a larger standard model of global collaboration, one that situates the dynamics of physics within a dynamics of human progress.

=== The structure of dialectic ===
While McShane identified the implementation of genetic method as Lonergan's most obscure challenge to his disciples, he identified dialectic as his clearest challenge, though by no means the easiest. It is hard to say how many tens of thousands of words he wrote about the structure of dialectic, which he described as a “shocking, brilliant, innovative, invitation." To arrive at an approximation, one would need to consider various website essay series, as well as published articles and chapters in books. As with other areas of focus and interest, McShane's prodigious writings and teachings on the structure of dialectic call for the kind of creative research and communal recycling that he did his best to initiate.

In an attempt to communicate the challenge popularly and without footnotes, McShane wrote three chapters on dialectic in Futurology Express. There he described dialectic as a mix of private and public tasks of dialectic elders who are flexible, “like the flexibility of a great tennis player meeting the oddest of volleys,” and who have “minds grasping for the flickers of integral human goings-on.” He related this to the task of Comparison, one of six italicized words in Lonergan's terse description of the structure of dialectic. He adds that those doing Comparison are competent in scientific understanding and autobiographically appreciative of the lengthy, patient messing around required to become intelligently competent, as opposed to merely technically competent. “The issue is the personal cultivation of what is called authentic nescience.” Dialectic becomes radically public when dialecticians “lay their cards on the table,” check one another by asking basic questions, even about themselves, and strive for a hard-won consensus on “what might be called an idealized version of previous reaches of humanity, showing the past something better than it was.”

In a book published posthumously, McShane identified dialectic as needed “to link Aristotle’s three [data, theory, verification] with Drucker’s [policy, planning, executive strategies] and fill out the elements in Næss.” He claimed that what is missing and desperately needed by those concerned about sustainability and survival is methodical deliberation about deliberation. “Deliberating over Archimedes’ deliberation is to push us towards a radical effective shift in our view of the disorientations of industrious humanity.”

McShane’s invitation to contemporaries to lay their cards on the table regarding their personal views on serious understanding reached a humorous, brutally honest, and possibly disturbing high point in one of his final essays, “On the Stile of a Crucial Experiment.” In the first paragraph of this essay, he recalled a scene from the film Gunfight at the O.K. Corral, a shootout when Virgil and Morgan Earp called out members of a group of outlaws called The Cowboys. "It was a calling-out of the usual sort in Western films, with the good guys and the bad guys clearly identified." In the last paragraph of the essay, McShane did his own calling-out:

There is, then, my simple calling out, which is just a repeat of Lonergan’s: this is the technique of discomforting intersubjectivity that is capable of “providing a statistically effective form for the next cycle of human action.” There is my broader calling out: I challenge you to check—that word in its many senses—your biased corralled stile-sitting against serious understanding. Both my simple call and my broader call-out is to global humanity and not just to Lonergan students, but I have sung out that joke abundantly already.

=== Engineering progress ===
The proposed “turn to the idea” of beautiful, efficient global collaborators intending “cumulative and progressive results,” with a sub-group “bearing fruit” in local communications, clashes with notions of “pure science” as opposed to “applied science,” and notions of “hard sciences” as opposed to arts, humanities, and social sciences. These notions tend to dominate both popular culture and academic praxis. The first set of contrasting notions, which was popularly expressed in the American television sitcom The Big Bang Theory, still permeates many a worldview. The second set permeates current divisions of majors, departments, and schools in higher education. It also permeates efforts to use “strictly” or “purely scientific” criteria to establish a precise meaning of Anthropocene, and to pin down where and when the purported new geologic epic began. The ongoing effort to locate a Global Boundary Stratotype Section and Point (informally known as "golden spike") on the part of the Anthropocene Working Group assumes a methodological divide between scientists, humanists, social scientists, and others. It would seem that "aesthetic loneliness" is on the periphery of scientific method while scientific wonder is on the periphery of a liberal arts education.

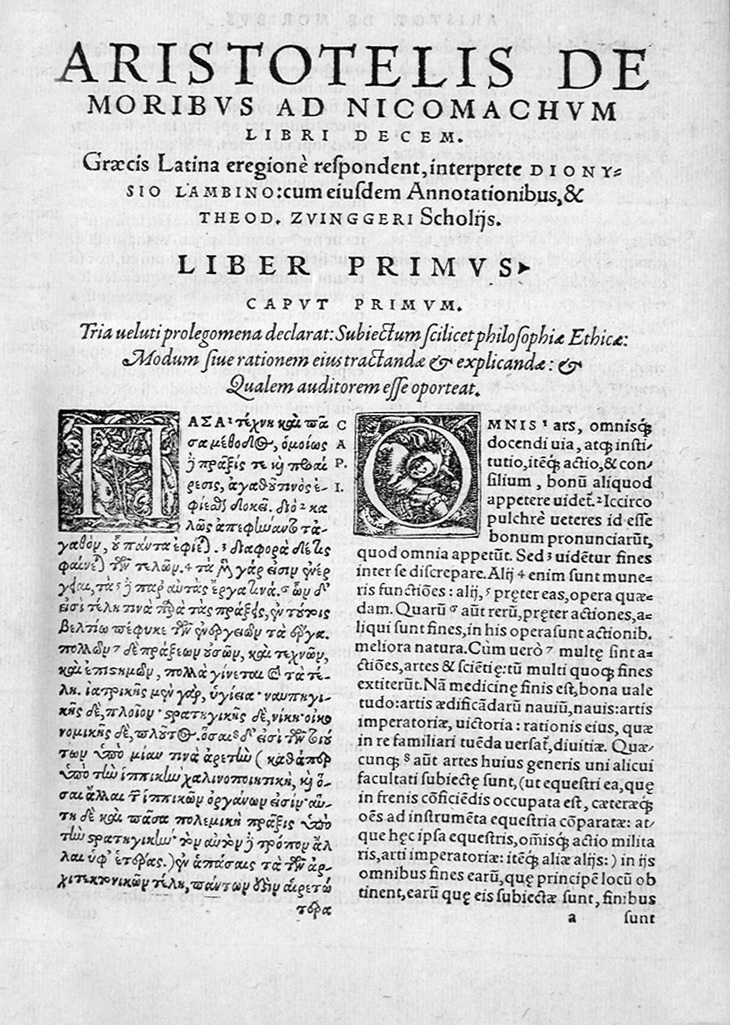
First page of a 1566 edition of Nichomachean Ethics in Greek and Latin

In various places McShane traced the implicit or explicit views to Aristotelian notions of speculative and practical science. It is an age-old belief and expectation that contrasts practice (from Ancient Greek πρᾶξις [prâxis]—human doing and action, the conduct resulting from deliberations and the choices humans make), theory (from Greek θεωρία [theōria]—contemplation, speculation), and making (from Greek ποίησις [poiēsis]). For Arisotle, praxis differs from theory, making, and the technology used in producing what is made. While both theory and practice involve thinking, the former aims at "speculative" or "theoretical" knowledge of what is unchanging, while the latter aims at practical, less precise knowledge of human actions. It would have made no sense to Arisotle to ask if there were fundamental questions about nature (from Greek φύσις [physis]) whose solution depends on the character of the individual studying nature.

To shake up and out a rather odd meaning of “metaphysics,” as well as what he described as “a psychology conservatively grounded in a certain facticity of the past,” McShane replaced the word metaphysics with futurology, later with engineering. He envisaged a globally shared Praxisweltanschauung of engineering progress, an “adequate geogenetic heuristics of history.” In the last essay of the Æcornomics series, titled “Engineering as Dialectic,” he wrote optimistically of “some few people who will face the details of seeding the slow, serious, self-sacrificing ‘resolute and effective intervention in this historical process.’”

With regard to a possible shared Praxisweltanschauung, McShane regularly posed this question: “Do you view humanity as possibly maturing—in some serious way—or messing along between good and evil, whatever you think they are?” Expressing and defending one's position effectively moves one beyond Weltanschauung to Praxisweltanschauung, even if one's view is that theory and praxis are as different as carrying out specialized research at CERN and signing and implementing the Paris Agreement to reduce greenhouse emissions and limit global warning to 1.5 °C. Furthermore, expressing and defending one's view about the future of humanity autobiographically, and in the company of others doing the same, is an intimation of doing dialectic, which requires brutal honesty, for example, about one's view regarding the place of heuristic structures and convenient symbolisms in engineering progress.

== Criticism ==
=== Language, style, and clarity ===
One criticism of McShane's work was that the language he used, the neologisms he created, and the style of his writings were unnecessarily obscure and were off-putting for some readers whom, at times, he addressed directly: “I will not in fact be talking here about systems of philosophy. I will be talking about the reader, you, and asking you to attend to yourself, to ask yourself certain simple questions, to reach elementary answers.” Time and again, he encouraged his readers to take our eyes of the page while reading and cited what Gaston Bachelard wrote in The Poetics of Space about reading a house or a nest with one's eyes off the page. His colleague and long-time friend Conn O’Donovan recalled reading the typescript of Plants and Pianos in 1971 and “thinking that McShane’s written expression was not as precise as it might be, that he was beginning to let language run away with him.” Some thirty years after reading that typescript, O’Donovan asked:

Was I then witnessing in McShane the emergence of a deliberate, self-consciously new approach to language and meaning? Was he perhaps deciding to allow language to run away with him, but somehow under his control, and not to allow himself to be controlled by already controlled meaning? Was this a key moment in the development of his own special kind of creative scholarly writing?

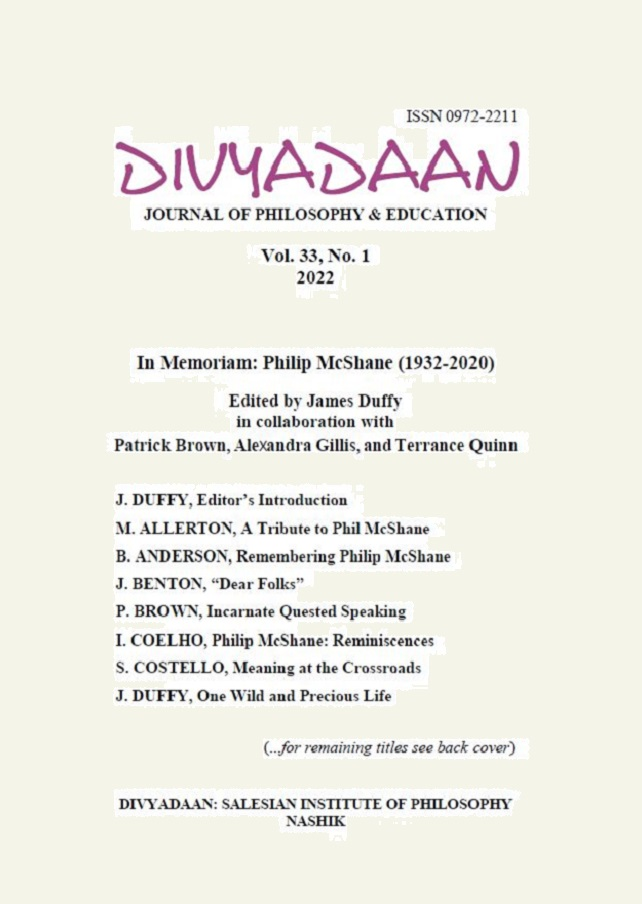
In Memoriam: Philip McShane (1932-2020)

Another colleague wrote in his tribute to McShane that while he “could be very orderly and disciplined in his writings and lectures, not infrequently in later years both types of his presentations were sprinkled with verbal novelties, asides, puns, jokes, and other unusual elements. Some colleagues find that this style facilitates their understanding, but others find that it impedes it.” A younger colleague wrote in his contribution to the same Festschrift that “soon after Method was published [1972], Phil seized on Lonergan’s notion of ‘linguistic feedback’ and its essential role in advancing self-appropriation, both phylogenetically and ontogenetically. For years, he practically flogged the theme of linguistic feedback.” An example of such feedback is replacing the letter “c” with the letter “k” in the word heuristic or pocket.

One of the most extensive published criticisms of McShane's language, style, and clarity occurred in 2001 before the publication of Lonergan's Phenomenology and Logic, which McShane edited and introduced. One of the readers invited by the University of Toronto Press to review McShane's editor's introduction and appendix had significant reservations and asked him to rewrite the appendix or eliminate it altogether. The reader questioned his “intent on mystifying” what is “already familiar to every competent phenomenologist,” and added that “Lonergan himself, in this reader’s opinion, was not in the least inclined towards esotericism or mystification.”

In his reply to the reader, McShane wrote that his efforts to contextualize the volume were aimed at “saving it from haute vulgarization,” or what he would sometimes call negative haute vulgarization—the clear, direct expression that “Joey” had hoped to find in the editor's introduction. He also recalled a favorite quote from Samuel Beckett, about direct expression:

Here is direct expression−pages and pages of it. And if you don't understand it, Ladies and Gentlemen, it is because you are too decadent to receive it. You are not satisfied unless form is so strictly divorced from content that you can comprehend the one almost without bothering to read the other. This rapid skimming and absorption of the scant cream of sense is made possible by what I may call a continuous process of salivation. The form that is an arbitrary and independent phenomenon can fulfill no higher function than that of a stimulus for a tertiary or quartary conditioned reflex of dribbling comprehension.

Had McShane gone too far or, perhaps, not far enough? While writing about the short-term challenge of implementing a child-friendly pedagogy pivoting on the "Childout Principle," he acknowledged that a key challenge was to do something requiring a cultural shift and a new language: “You might begin to write yourself and the world with a new alphabet, in a new language. ‘The alphabet writes the world, and the world comes to pass through the alphabet: writing and world coexist in a state of feverish rapture that defies language.'"

=== Idiosyncratic economics ===
In 1977 McShane applied to the Canada Council for a grant to work on economics. One of the assessors of his application wrote: “What we have here is a case of two idiosyncratic theologians trying to do idiosyncratic economics. The probability of this being fruitful is not zero, but it is not much higher.” Thirty years later, when McShane addressed an audience at University Seoul, a professor in the audience denied anything idiosyncratic or original in what McShane was presenting and remarked “it is all in Mankiw,” referring to Gregory Mankiw’s introductory economics textbook and blockbuster bestseller Principles of Economics. More recently, the Australian economist Paul Oslington has written a critique of Lonergan’s economics that includes a critique of McShane for “overselling” Lonergan's economics in the editor's introduction to For a New Political Economy.

McShane considered the basic insights of two-flow economic analysis empirically verifiable and accessible to high school students. He did, however, recognize that it would not be easy "to change a recipe that is 200 years old." In addition, he identified a needed correction to a mistake he had made in the area of the pedagogy. In his 2019 essay “Finding an Effective Economist: A Central Theological Challenge,” McShane described his mistake in these words:

Looking back now with wonderful hindsight, we [Lonergan and he] were making the wrong moves. We should have put his request of 1968 in the context of the eighth functional specialty’s follow-through that I call C_{9}. The mood of statistically-effective outreach should have dominated both my two 1977 presentations and his six years of teaching.

What McShane described as "the mood of statistically-effective outreach" refers to teaching as communications, a type of direct discourse that is related to but distinct from the indirect discourse of research, interpretation, and history. Direct communications − which invites, persuades, and cajoles students, colleagues, friends, and neighbors to makes sense out of distinct flows of basic and non-basic (surplus) goods and services − might generate "backfires," for example when a bright students asks what an IS/LM curve (also known as the IS/LM model) is and why it is not viable for real economic analysis. While McShane wrote introductory texts, including the preface to the 2017 edition of Economics for Everyone inviting the serious reader to imagine "the concrete reality of, say, a small bakery in its dependence on firms that supply its needs," he also recognized the need for "massively innovative primers that would meet millennial needs, 500-page texts of empirically rich, locally oriented, normatively focused non-truncated writing."

=== Breaking with tradition ===
An implicit criticism of McShane breaking with tradition occurred during the planning stages of the conference “Revisiting Lonergan’s Anthropology” that took place in Rome in November 2013. The organizers of the event did not invite him to take part in the event, either by giving a talk or by participating in one of the various panels. McShane, who was never interested in founding a “a little school of Lonergan at the Gregorian” or at some other Jesuit university in North America, published a critique of the conference in Rome, which for him symbolized what he called Lonerganism.

I have, in recent years, made quite clear my disagreement with that tradition that now prevails in Lonergan studies, of avoiding the challenge of functional collaboration. Indeed, of not noticing, ignoring, avoiding—whatever—that the question, “What does Lonergan mean by functional collaboration?” has not been taken seriously by the group. I thus give a definite meaning to the boldfaced word whatever by my title: the group seems—indeed quite evidently is—intent on muzzling the scientific Lonergan.

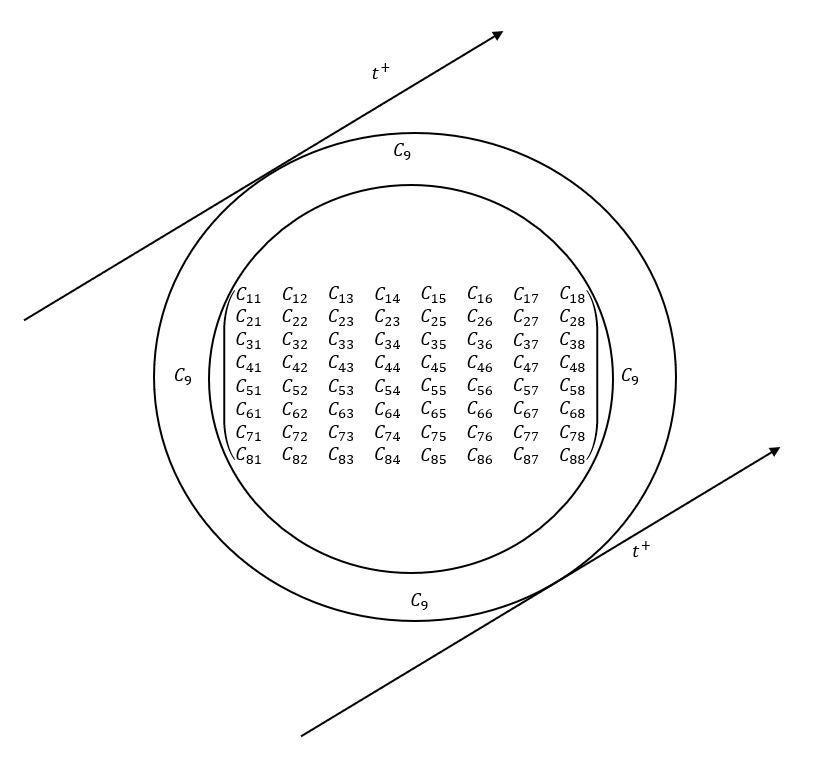
A C_{ij} matrix of possible conversations, face to face, or through journals or electronic exchanges.

Like Lonergan, McShane took seriously what Butterfield wrote about the scientific revolution "outshining everything since the rise of Christianity and reducing the Renaissance and Reformation to the rank of mere episodes, mere internal displacements, within the system of medieval Christendom." Both men advocated the development and implementation of apt symbolism and heuristic structures. This had and continues to have what might be called an "electrifying" effect upon those in academic disciplines that seem to thrive without implementing symbolism and heuristics. “Whether it is C_{ij} or W_{3}, the symbolism reminds, cajoles, and forces the authors not to sit comfortably on the fence between commonsense eclecticism and scientific collaboration.^{†} The symbols, you might even say, are a way of electrifying that fence.”

With respect to his and others’ efforts to shift towards the idea and the reality of functional collaboration, which requires some form of communal implementation, McShane knew it would be a form of learning by doing. Since the needed division of labor is not continuous with much of current academic practice, he expected that the adventure in the decades to come would be so-so at best. It was for this reason that McShane would quip: “If a thing is worth doing, it is worth doing badly.” He had a leading role in organizing various “doings,” one of them an international conference in 2014 that resulted in the publication of a volume of essays in which each of the twelve authors implemented the same four-part structure: Context, Content, Hand-On, and Final Reflections. He wrote the following evaluation of the volume of essays published in 2016:

We stumbled away, as best we could, from the ethos of academic disciplines. We pretended to be “at the level of the times,”^{†} as any wise doctorate student does in a doctorate thesis. But none of us were. Further, part of the paradox of luminosity and adult growth is that elder members of our group were regularly better tuned to “all that is lacking”^{††} than younger members. I, then, more than others, knew what a shabby shot we were having at getting the show on the road.

Two years later, McShane participated in a round table discussion of Method in Theology at the West Coast Methods Institute at Loyola Marymount University. In preparation for the conference, McShane had written an essay proposing a paradigm for panel discussions, what he called “a full heuristic paradigm.” He submitted his essay to Method: Journal of Lonergan Studies, which had previously published five of his essays. The referee's report sent to him was succinct and did not recommend publishing the essay, as those "involved in 'Lonergan studies' need insights as much if not more than prophetic exhortations." In his reply to the co-editor of the journal, McShane did not take issue with the use of the word prophetic to describe his essay, but he underscored that prior to Lonergan's discovery of the dynamics of functional collaboration in 1965, he had “clearly shifted the norms of the usual trivial comparison-work to the control of a genetic sequence of prior efforts to understanding whatever.” The rejection of McShane's essay for publication inspired him to write the series of essays Public Challenging the Method Board.

From time to time, McShane described his own efforts as “random dialectics,” so not the structured encounter that he wrote about at length and only experienced in the “proto-dialectic” exercises in the last year of his life. Over the years, he invited colleagues to step forth and indicate publicly where and how he had gone astray reading Insight and Method in Theology. The response was what he called “disgusting non-scientific silence.”

While McShane admitted having benefitted from a certain kind of luck in his education, he also realized that some of his works were simply “too far out” and did not expect to see much success in his lifetime. Most contemporaries in philosophy and theology had not worked with Markov tensors or thought to use Greek symbols to imagine the longitude and latitude of Luther or Descartes on an expanding globe of meaning.

"Toynbee's A Study of History can be regarded as an attempt at a great Markovian reduction of the historical process to a very few variables and very large subdivisions and the consequent description of the process by a multiple Markov tensor of manageable rank.”^{†} My own imaging shifts this tensor into an earth-sphere expanding out along a radial axis t—this helps to glimpse—think longitude and latitude for θ and Φ—my meaning of ^{θΦT}. Think of the ^{θΦT} weave of pairs like Antioch and Alexandria, Luther and Lainez, Descartes and Dilthey, whatever.

McShane's long-term optimism regarding the emergence of a creative minority caring for the globe was and is consistent with the worldview "emergent probability," which was the focus of his doctoral thesis. In the Preface to the 2nd edition of the book version of his thesis, which McShane wrote in the fall of 2012, he cited a long passage from Insight where Lonergan wrote that the possibility of a recurrence scheme beginning to function shifts from a product of fractions to their sum when any one of the events (A or B or C or ...) of the scheme occurs. He concluded the Preface with these words: "The cyclically-summed actualities can, over millennia, shift from Poisson distribution to a Normal and normative law, giving supreme plausibility to a Tower of Able of serious intimate^{†} understanding grounding, literally, a plain plane of radiant life in the next million years."
