= Charlotte Tansey =

Canadian educator, academic and writer

- Born: Charlotte Hunter Tansey c. 1922; Montreal, Quebec, Canada
- Died: 26 August 2010 (aged 89); Montreal, Quebec, Canada

Academic background
- Education: Université de Montréal (BA); McGill University (MA)

Charlotte Hunter Tansey (c. 1922 – 26 August 2010) was a Canadian academic, educator and writer who founded the Thomas More Institute for Adult Education in Montreal, in 1945.

== Early life and education ==
Charlotte Tansey was born in Montreal, Quebec, the daughter of Michael Tansey and Charlotte Hunter. She had a brother, Peter, and sisters Barbara, Carol and Mary. She studied English literature at College Marguerite Bourgeoys of the Université de Montréal, earning a Bachelor of Arts in 1943, and then received her Master of Arts from McGill University in 1946. She wrote her thesis about Gertrude Stein.

== Career ==
She was a founding director of the Thomas More Institute for Adult Education in 1945, and was later its president for 18 years up until her retirement in 1998. The institute was set up to make it easier to pursue an undergraduate degree by taking night classes. The educational philosophy valued question and debate rather than lectures. The school was affiliated first with the Université de Montréal, and later with Bishop's University.

Her scholarly publications included co-authorship of "Creative Memory: Five Suggestions for Categorization of Adult Learning" (Adult Education Quarterly; 1974) and Caring about Meaning: patterns in the life of Bernard Lonergan (1982). She also received honorary doctorates from Concordia University, Bishop's and Burlington College.

== Personal life ==
She died at age 89, from kidney failure, on 26 August 2010 at Jewish General Hospital in Montreal.
