= Radical unintelligibility =

Radical Unintelligibility, a term coined by Bernard Lonergan, is the philosophical idea that we can act against our better judgment. We can refuse to choose what we know is worth choosing. It is the refusal to make a decision that one deems one ought to make. Mortal sin is radically unintelligible: when we commit a mortal sin, we fully consent to do something despite knowing that it is wrong to do it.
