= The Lonergan Review =

- Discipline: Religious Studies, philosophy, theology
- Language: English
- Edited by: Richard M. Liddy

Publication details
- History: 2009–present
- Publisher: Bernard J Lonergan Institute at Seton Hall University (United States)
- Frequency: Annual

Standard abbreviations
- ISO 4: Lonergan Rev.

Indexing
- ISSN: 1948-4747 (print); 1948-4755 (web)
- LCCN: 2009-202668
- OCLC no.: 407907009

Links
- Journal homepage; Tables of content, all issues

The Lonergan Review is a peer-reviewed academic journal dedicated to the exploration of the thought and legacy of Bernard Lonergan (1904–1984). The purpose of the journal is to promote continuing interest in the field of Lonergan studies. It was established in 2009 as the official journal of the Bernard J. Lonergan Institute by the Center for Catholic Studies at Seton Hall University, and is distributed by the Philosophy Documentation Center. Richard Liddy is its director.
