= Regis College, Toronto =

Federated college of the University of Toronto

Regis College
- Federated college
- University of Toronto
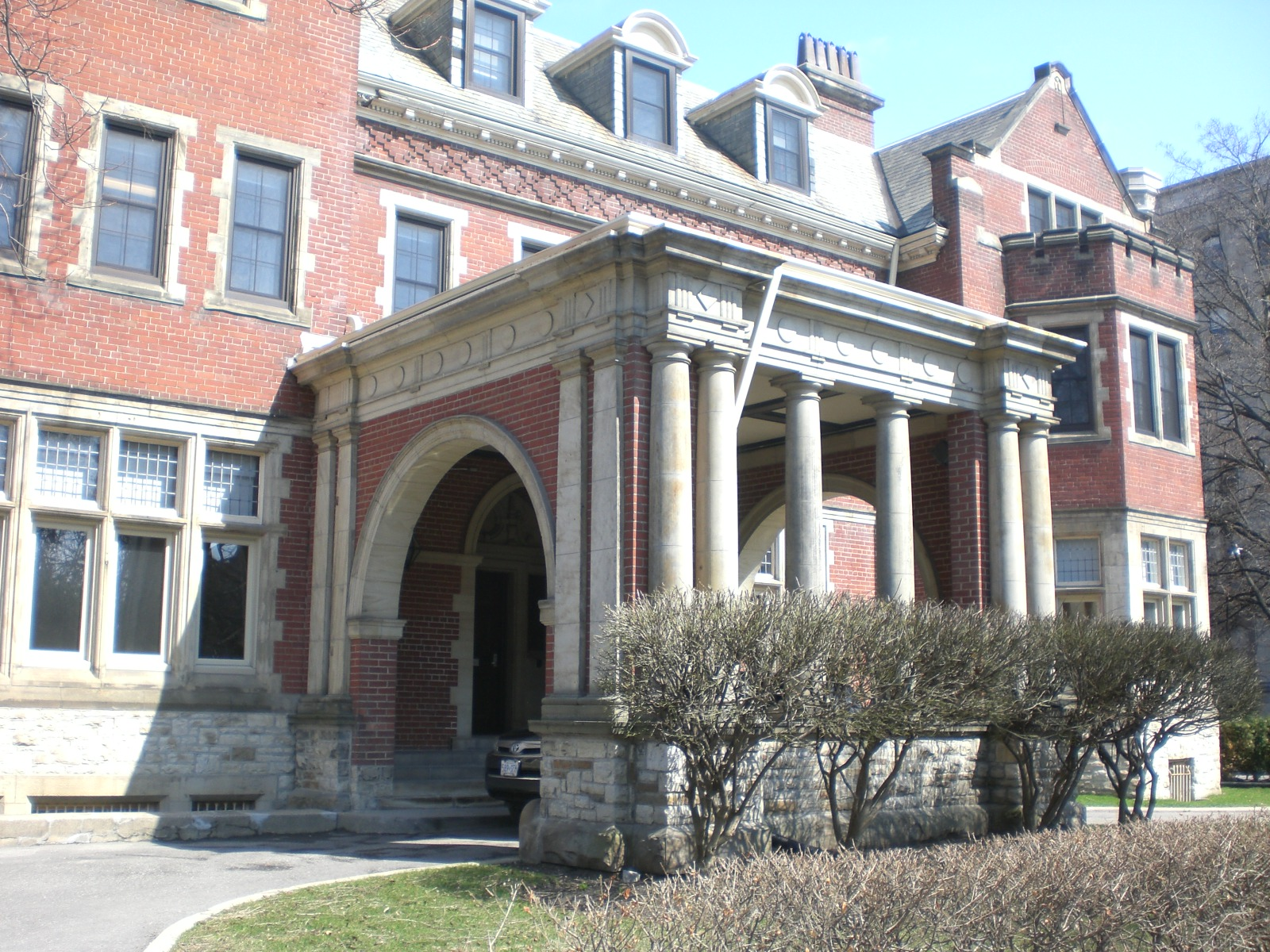

- Arms: Symbol of Christ the King
- Location: 100 Wellesley Street West, Toronto, Ontario, Canada
- Coordinates: 43°39′50″N 79°23′25″W
- Latin name: Collegium Christi Regis
- Motto: Ad maiorem Dei gloriam (Latin)
- Motto in English: "For the greater glory of God"
- Established: 1930; 96 years ago
- Rector: Michael Kolarcik, SJ
- President: Gordon Rixon, SJ
- Chancellor: Jeffrey S. Burwell, SJ
- Affiliations: Catholic Church (Society of Jesus); Toronto School of Theology; Association of Theological Schools
- Website: regiscollege.ca

Regis College is a federated college of the University of Toronto and a postgraduate Jesuit seminary. It is located on the St. George campus at 100 Wellesley Street West in downtown Toronto, Ontario, Canada. Founded in 1930, it is the Jesuit school of theology in Canada and a member institution of the Toronto School of Theology.

== History ==
=== Foundation ===
Regis College began as the Jesuit philosophy college at 403 Wellington Street in downtown Toronto in September 1930 (after Loretto Abbey left in 1927). It then offered philosophy programmes to Jesuit scholastics preparing for priesthood. It was in 1943 that the programme of offerings was expanded to include theology. In 1954, the Jesuit seminary was formally named Collegium Christi Regis, The College of Christ the King. In 1956 Regis College was accredited as a pontifical faculty (a status it retains) by becoming the School of Theology of St. Mary's University in Halifax, Nova Scotia and thus became able to offer ecclesiastical degrees in theology.

=== Bayview Avenue site ===
In 1961, the college moved to a new site on Bayview Avenue in Willowdale, Toronto. There, it taught exclusively theology. The 40-acre site, was offered to the Jesuits as a location for the college by the Sisters of St. Joseph in 1958.

In 1969, Regis College was one of the founding colleges of the Toronto School of Theology. Within its own federation, the University of Toronto granted all but the theology or divinity degrees.

In 1970, the college joined the Association of Theological Schools in the United States and Canada. Membership was granted in 1980, and renewed in 2001 and 2011.

=== St. Mary Street site ===
In 1976, the college moved to St. Mary Street in Downtown Toronto, close to its present site. The Bayview site was sold to Ontario Bible College, which became the Tyndale University College and Seminary in 2003. That year, it admitted its first non-Jesuit students. Since 1978, by virtue of a change made in its charter, the University of Toronto has granted theology degrees conjointly with Regis College. Regis College became a federated college of the University of Toronto. This arrangement was renewed for a further ten years in 2004.

=== Wellesley Street site ===
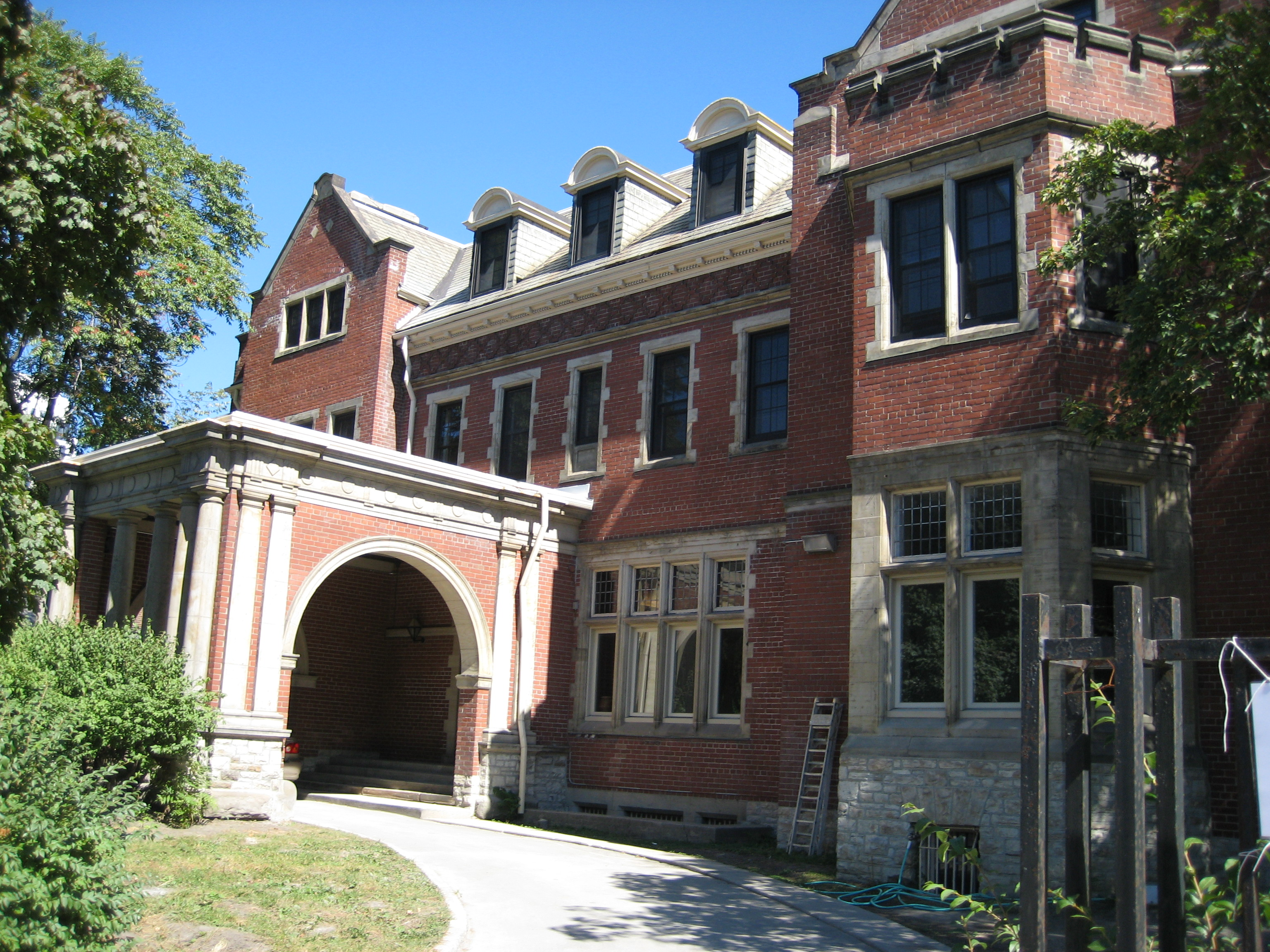
The west side of Regis College on Queen's Park Crescent East

In August 2008, Regis College agreed to move to Christie House at 100 Wellesley Street West, on the corner of Queen's Park Crescent East. The site is across from Queen's Park on the University of Toronto's St. George campus. The property was formerly a female residence building for St. Michael's College and was administered by the Sisters of St. Joseph, who ran St. Joseph's College School next door.

The University of Toronto bought the site from the Sisters of St. Joseph and began leasing it to Regis College. Renovation work was carried out to make the building suitable for the college in time for the start of the academic year in September 2009. As part of the leasing agreement with the university, the half of the building closest to the school was converted so that it could be used by the university's Faculty of Music.

The building was originally the home of William Mellis Christie, and after his death, it was the residence of his son Robert Jaffrey Christie. The property is located across from the Ontario Legislative Building. It is to the south of St. Michael's College and is next to buildings that previously housed the offices of Marshall McLuhan.

== Academics ==
In the traditions of Jesuit spirituality, scholarship and service, Regis College promotes an integrated spirituality that emphasizes justice, critical dialogue and academic pursuits. As per all Jesuit institutions, it remains grounded in the concept of ad maiorem Dei gloriam, for the greater glory of God.

Regis College confers three major types of theological degrees: basic degree programmes, graduate degree programmes, and ecclesiastical degrees. Civil degrees are awarded conjointly by Regis College and the University of Toronto and ecclesiastical degrees are awarded solely by Regis College.

=== Civil degrees ===
- Basic degree programmes
  - Master of Theological Studies (MTS)
    - First Studies stream
    - Integrating Studies stream
    - Theology, Spirituality, and the Arts Stream
  - Master of Arts in Ministry and Spirituality (MA in MS)
    - The Pastoral Praxis stream
    - The Ministry of Spiritual Direction stream
  - Master of Divinity (M.Div.)
- Graduate degree programmes
  - Master of Arts in Theological Studies (MA)
    - M.A. Option I stream (master's research paper)
    - M.A. Option II stream (course-only option)
  - Master of Theology (ThM)
    - Th.M. Option I stream (for admission to Ph.D.)
    - Th.M. Option II stream (terminal, with no admission to Ph.D.)
  - Doctor of Ministry (DMin)
  - Doctor of Philosophy in Theological Studies (Ph.D.)

=== Ecclesiastical degrees ===
- Basic degree programmes
  - Bachelor of Sacred Theology (STB)
- Graduate degree programmes
  - Licentiate of Sacred Theology (STL)
  - Doctor of Sacred Theology (STD)

== Notable faculty and alumni ==
- Michael Czerny, SJ, Czech-Canadian cardinal-prefect of the Dicastery for Promoting Integral Human Development
- Robert M. Doran, SJ, philosopher and theologian
- Charles Falzon, dean of The Creative School at Toronto Metropolitan University
- Mary Jo Leddy, writer, activist and social critic
- Bernard Lonergan, SJ, (1904–1984), philosopher, theologian, and economist
- Jacques Monet, SJ, (1930 –2024), historian
- John Navone, SJ, theologian, author, educator, professor emeritus of Biblical theology at the Pontifical Gregorian University in Rome

== Honor society ==
The Jesuit Honor Society's chapter of Alpha Sigma Nu was established at Regis College in 2000.

== Gallery ==
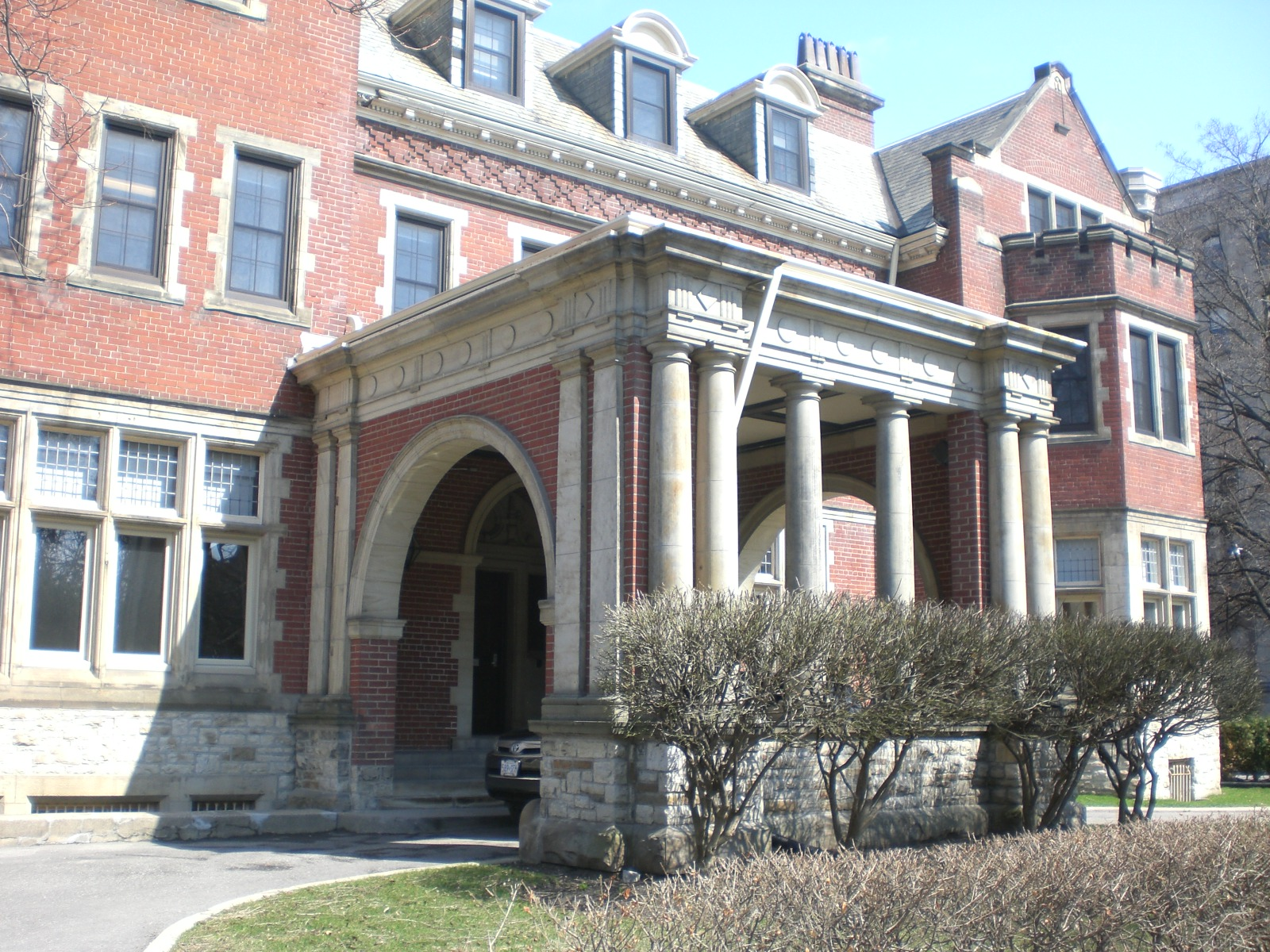
West side

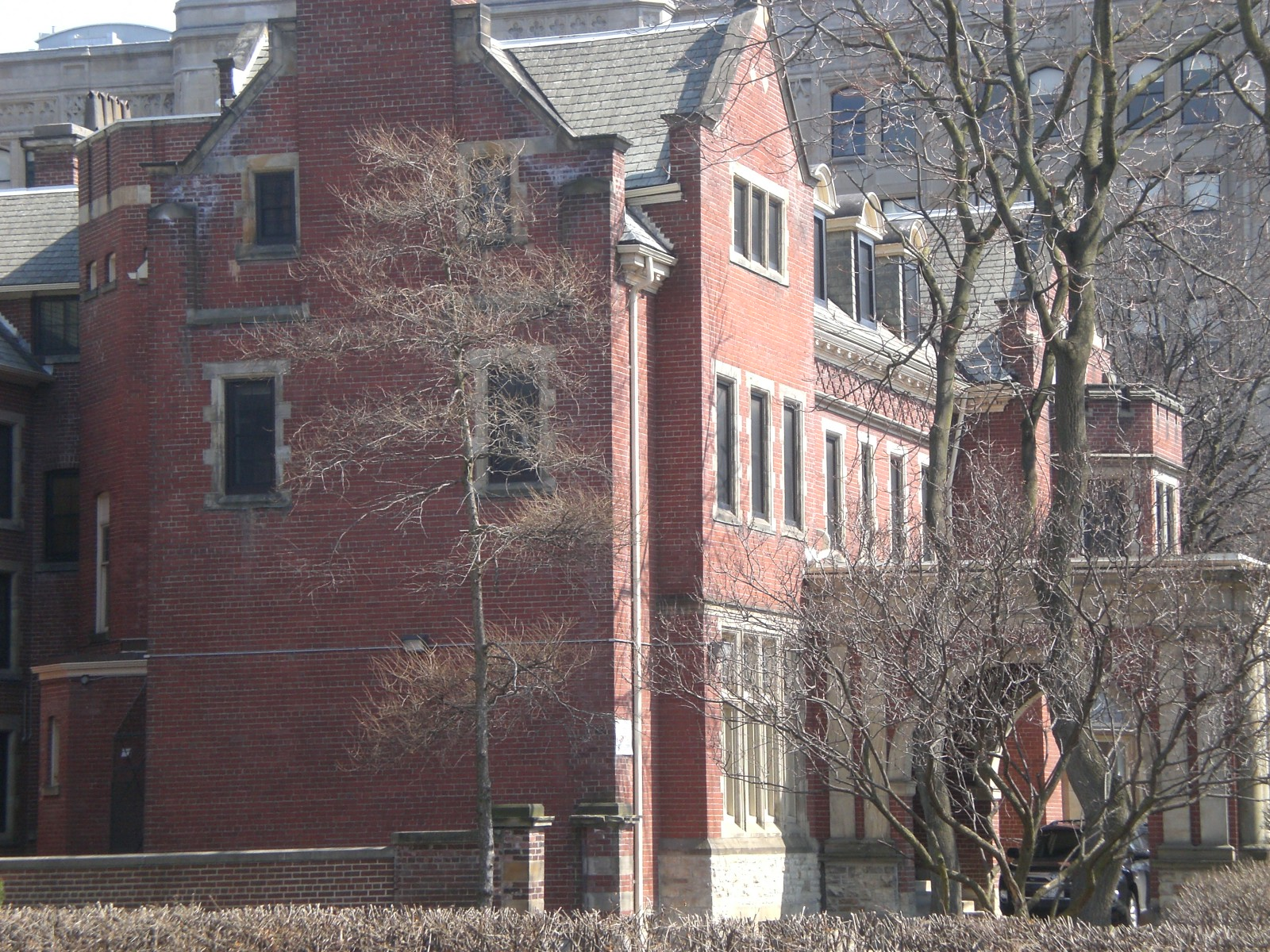
North side

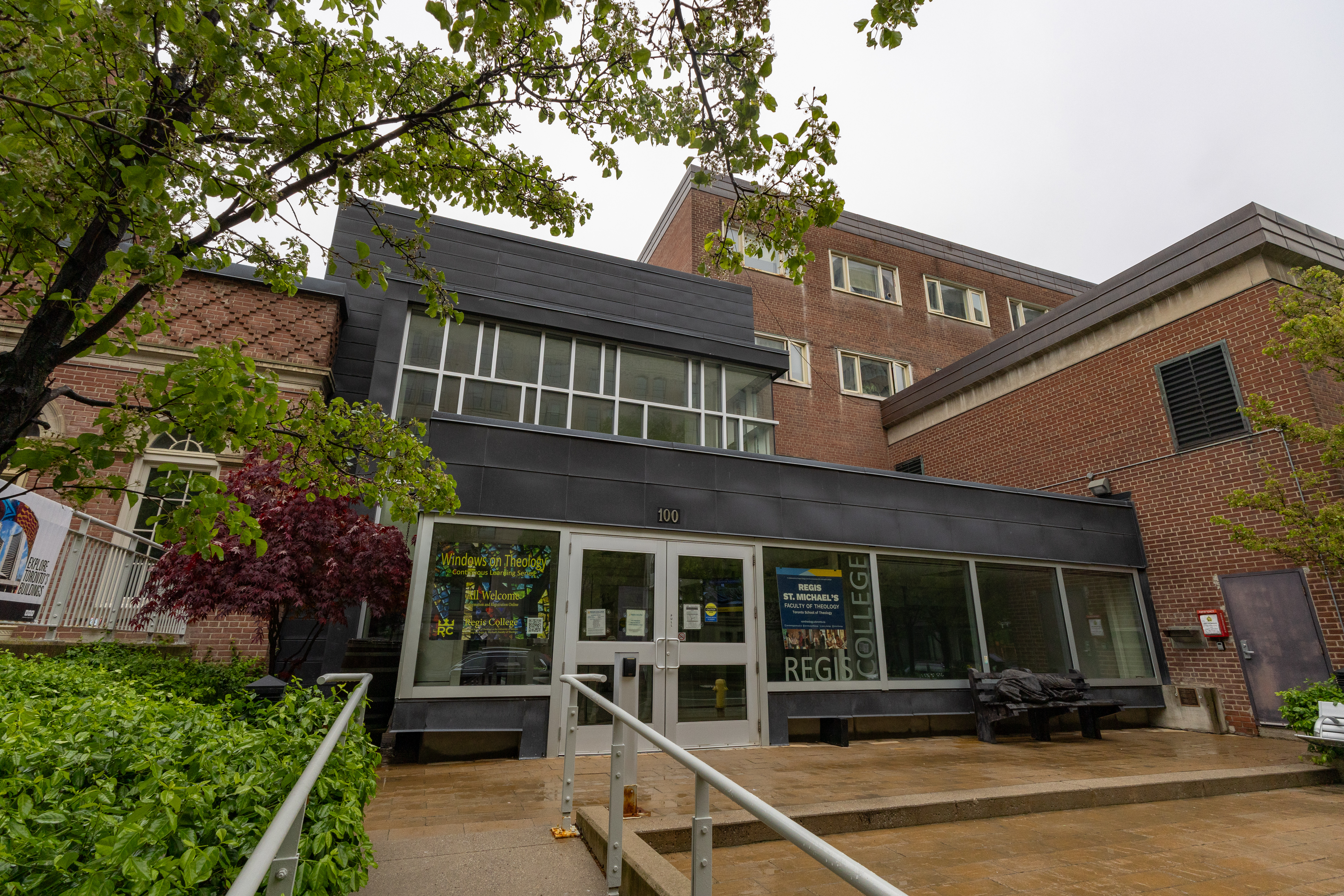
Main entrance

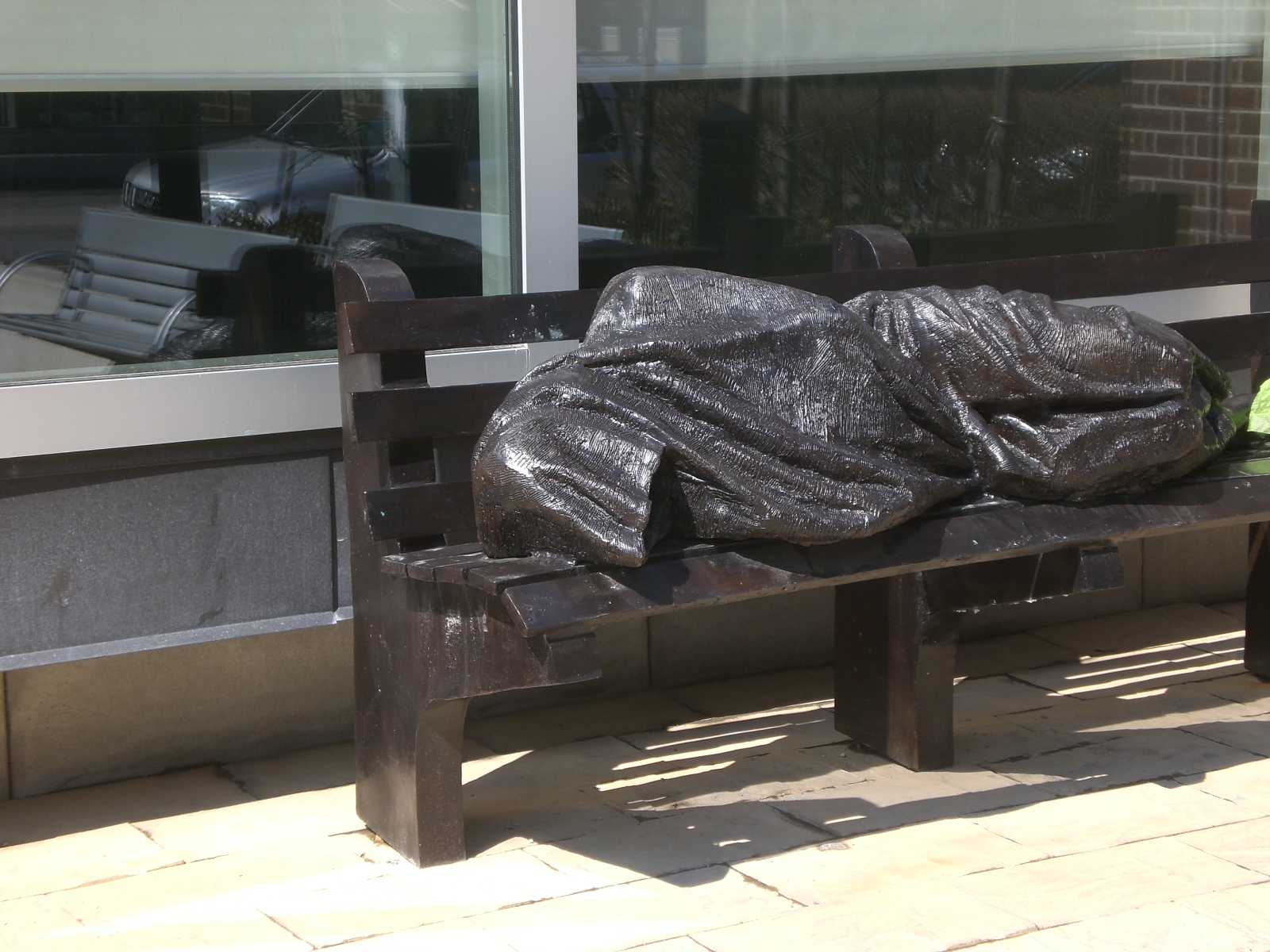
Jesus the Homeless sculpture outside

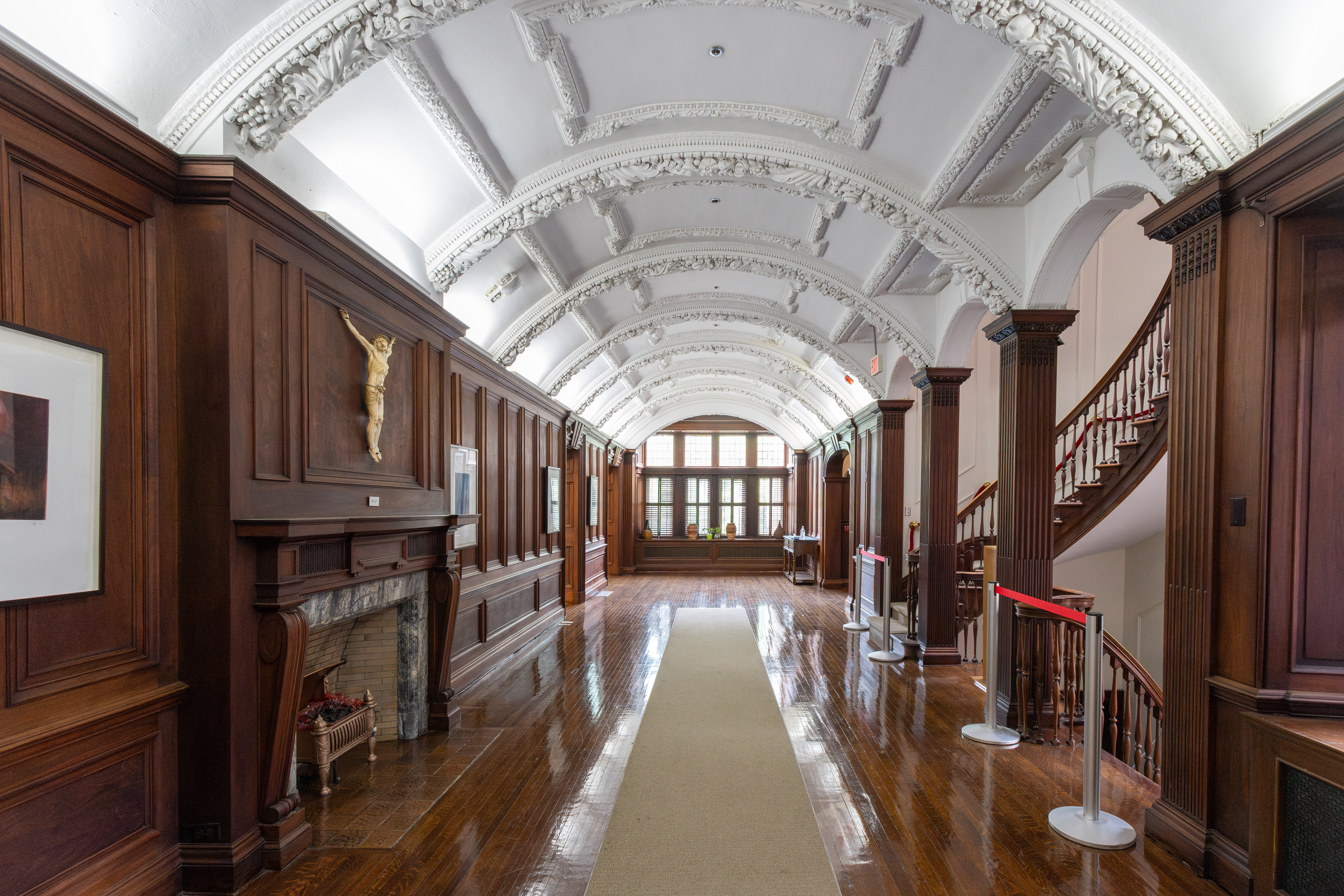
Central hallway

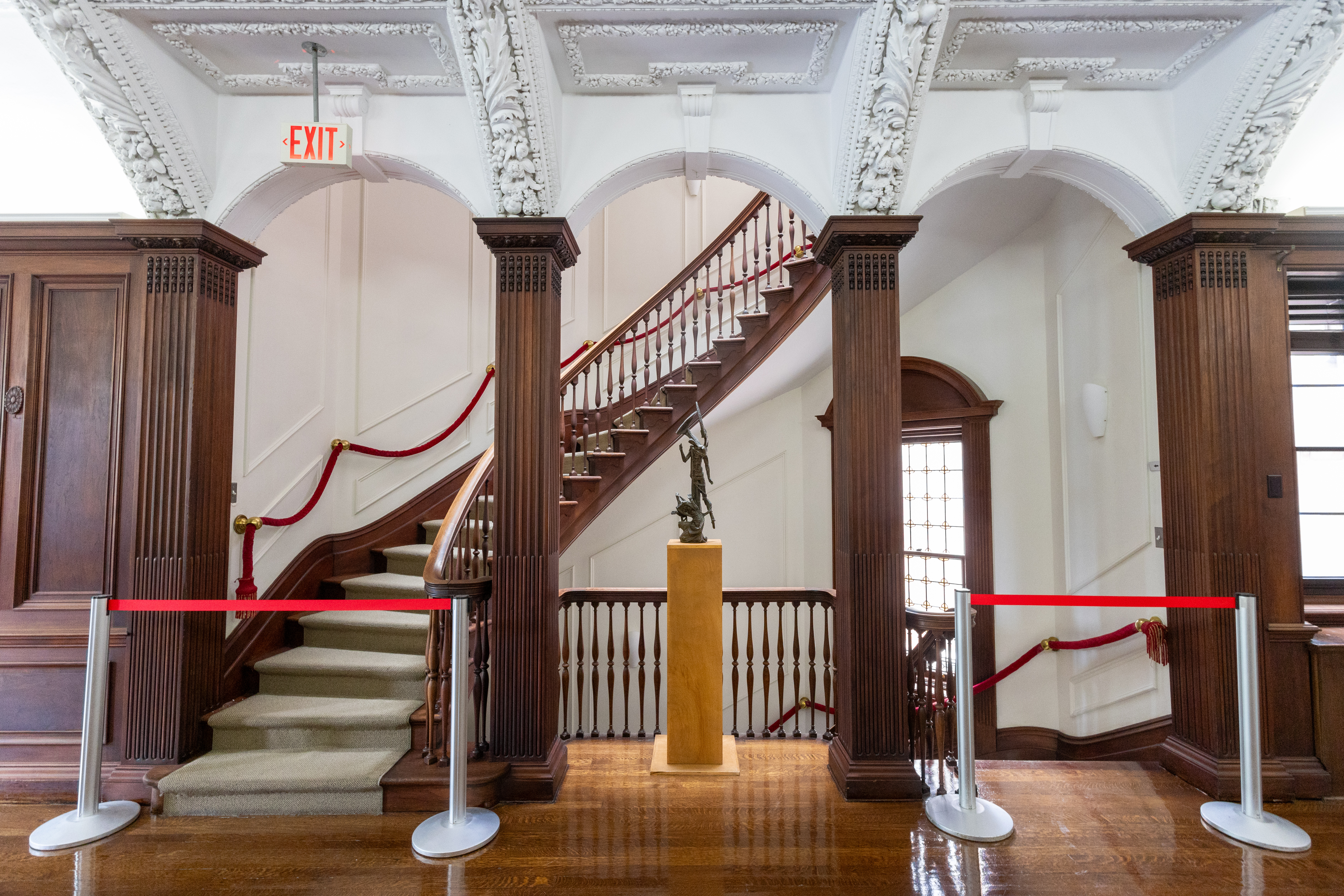
Main staircase

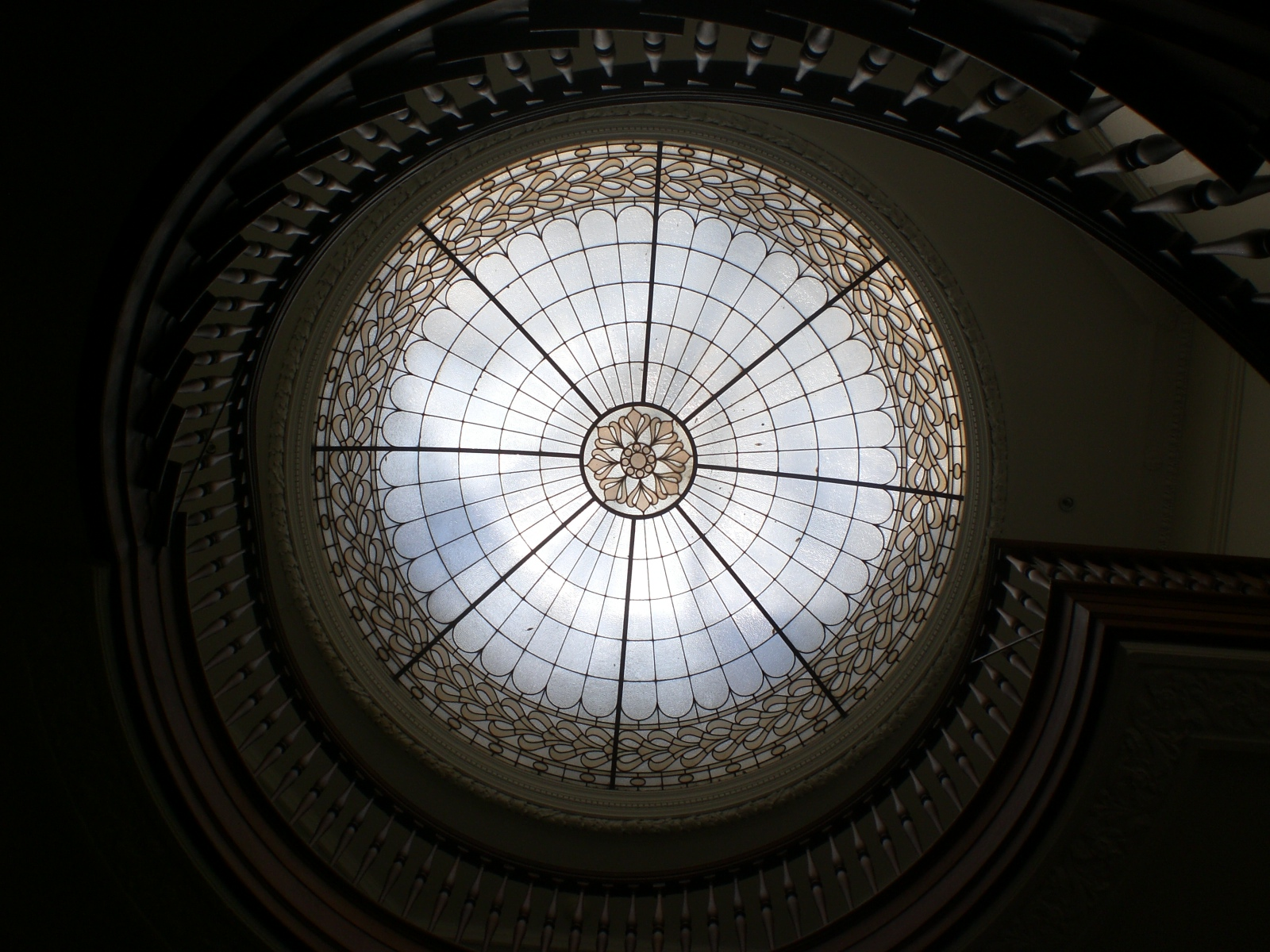
Skylight at the top of the staircase

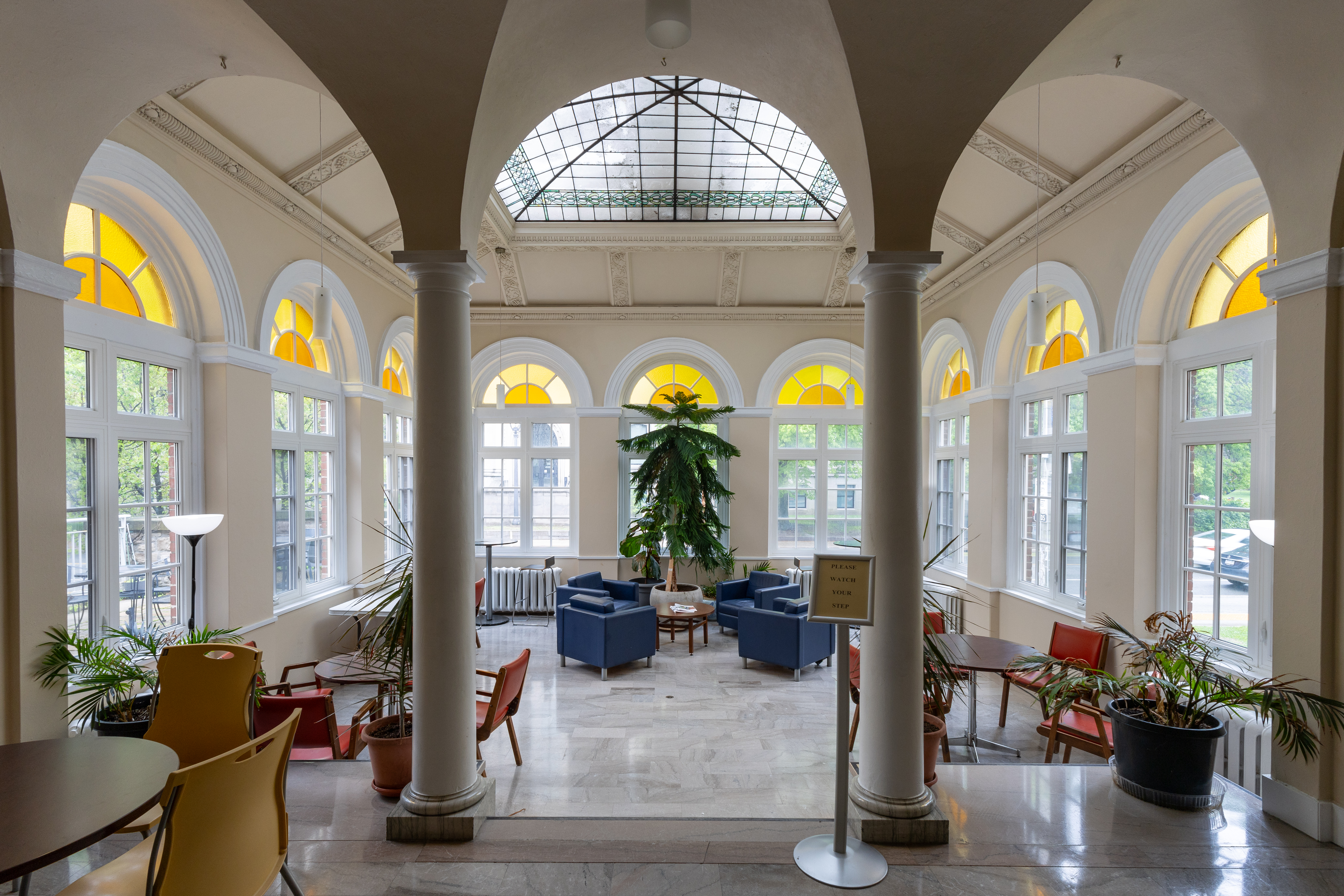
Solarium

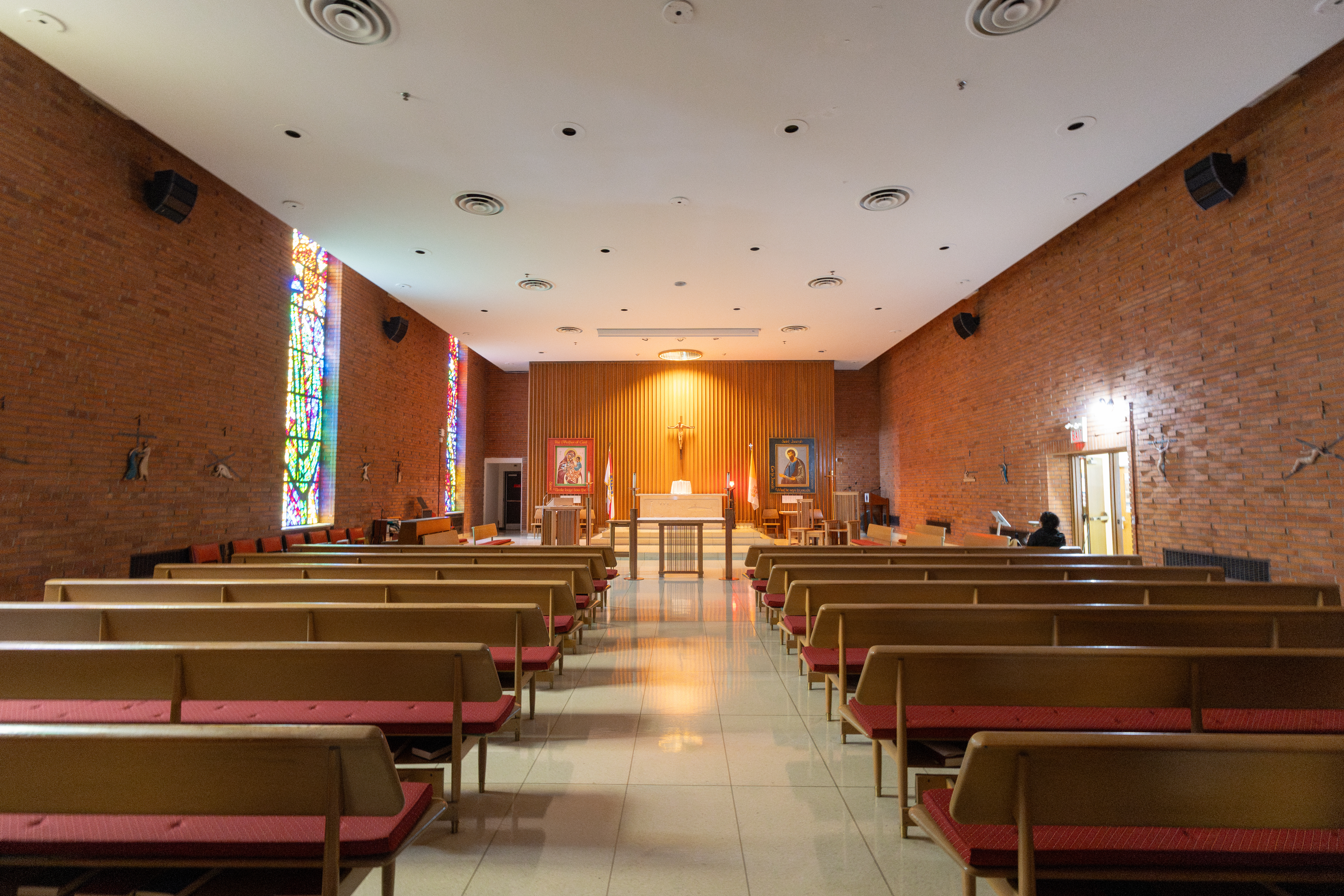
Chapel

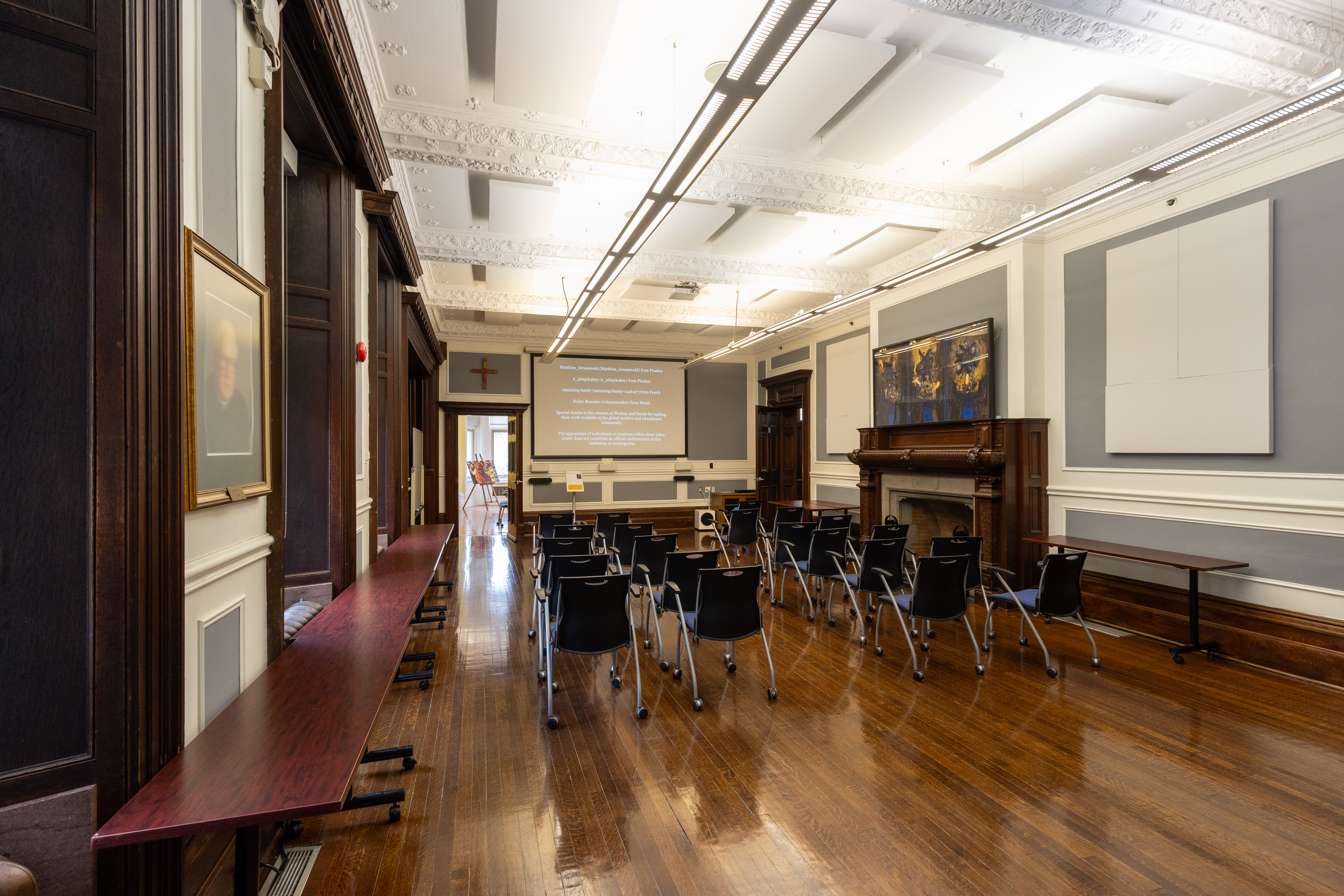
Room C

== In film and TV ==
Regis College is a popular location for films and TV series and has been used in the past by various film and television production companies. For example:

- Ice Princess – 2005
- Who Is Clark Rockefeller? – November 2009
- Sherlock Holmes – December 2009
- The Kennedys – July 2010
- Skins – August 2010
- Warehouse 13 – September 2010
- Perception (TV pilot) – December 2010
- Nurse 3D – September 2011
- Covert Affairs – August 2012
- Lost Girl – August 2014
- Pay the Ghost – August 2014

== See also ==
- List of Jesuit sites
