= Thomas More Institute =

Academic institution in Montreal, Quebec, Canada

Coordinates: 45.4920°N 73.5886°W

- Crest of Thomas More Institute
- Established: 1945
- Affiliations: Bishop's University
- Religious affiliation: Non-denominational
- Students: 300
- Location: 3405 Atwater Avenue, Westmount, Quebec, Canada
- Campus: Urban
- Website: www.thomasmore.qc.ca

The Thomas More Institute (TMI) for Adult Education is a secular academic institution located in Montreal, Quebec, Canada. It offers a program of university level studies in the liberal arts. Affiliated with Université de Montréal at its beginning, it is now affiliated with Bishop's University to jointly deliver Bachelor of Arts degrees.

== History ==
TMI was founded in Montreal in 1945 by a group of people, most of them in their twenties, including Charlotte Tansey, Martin O'Hara, Stan Machnik, and Veronica Smyth. The aim was to provide opportunities for lifelong learning and liberal arts education for adults. In 1950, TMI established the Workers' School, which offered evening classes in "Human Rights and Labour Unions," "The Rise of Labour Movements," and "Talking at Meetings," training workers to become union members. The Institute received a federal charter in 1959.

Today, annually, the institute has more than 400 registrations and 35-40 new courses. The adult students are of all ages, from those in their early 20s to several over 90 years of age.

== Discussion Method ==
TMI's teaching is inspired by the Socratic method as well as the Shared Inquiry approach developed by the Great Books Foundation, in which the leader uses primarily open-ended questions to guide discussion. Instead of conventional lectures, TMI for the most part offers discussion-based seminars that are guided by trained leaders and based upon carefully chosen and sequenced texts representing different perspectives on the questions each group has come together to explore. Although they may have special knowledge in a particular field, the leaders do not lecture or explain. Using the text as a basis, the discussion team asks questions to channel the conversation. Participants learn to listen to one another, so that each meeting allows people of varied ages and backgrounds to exchange their views on the week's readings. TMI's approach requires critical thinking, clear references to common terms, and respect for alternate views. The challenge in TMI courses is not for students to agree, or come to a consensus, but to embrace new ways of thinking that go beyond individual bias.

== Seniors' Outreach Program ==
In 1977, TMI launched an outreach program to take courses to seniors’ residences and centres in response to some of the Institute's original discussion leaders and students no longer having the mobility to come to courses downtown. The program continues to organize discussion groups on history, literature, science, and other liberal arts topics in residences and meeting places of older adults throughout the Montreal area.

== Lonergan ==
Bernard Lonergan, the Canadian philosopher, theologian, and economist, lectured at TMI, significantly shaping the learning and questioning experience offered by the institute. According to Lonergan himself, the 1945 lecture series that he delivered at TMI, entitled "Thought and Reality," served as the seed for his seminal book, Insight: A Study of Human Understanding (1957). TMI is also home to a large collection of Lonergan documents, including lecture notes and audio tapes, which are being digitized with the help of the Lonergan Research Institute. For many years, TMI organized a "Listening to Lonergan" lecture series during the autumn semester, co-sponsored by Concordia University and the Thomas More Research Institute.
