= Robert M. Doran =

Canadian theologian and academic (1939–2021)

The Reverend Robert M. Doran SJ
- Born: Robert Michael Doran; 20 June 1939; New York City, New York
- Died: January 20, 2021 (aged 81); Milwaukee, Wisconsin
- Other name: Bob Doran

Ecclesiastical career
- Religion: Christianity (Roman Catholic)
- Church: Latin Church
- Congregations: Society of Jesus

Academic background
- Education: Saint Louis University; Marquette University
- Thesis: Subject and Psyche (1975)
- Doctoral advisor: Matthew L. Lamb
- Influences: Bernard Lonergan, Paul Ricoeur, Carl Jung

Academic work
- Discipline: Theology
- Sub-discipline: Systematic theology
- Institutions: Marquette University; Regis College, Toronto
- Main interests: Philosophy and Theology of Bernard Lonergan
- Notable works: Theology and the Dialectics of History, The Trinity in History
- Notable ideas: Psychic Conversion

Robert Michael Doran SJ (20 June 1939 – 21 January 2021) was an American-Canadian Jesuit priest, and theologian, and Emmett Doerr Chair in Catholic Systematic Theology at Marquette University. He was known for his research on the works of the Jesuit theologian and philosopher Bernard Lonergan.
