= Bernard Lonergan =

Canadian philosopher and theologian (1904–1984)

The Reverend Bernard Lonergan SJ CC
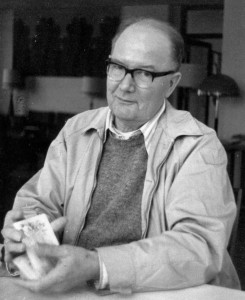
- Lonergan at Boston College
- Born: Bernard Joseph Francis Lonergan; 17 December 1904; Buckingham, Quebec, Canada
- Died: 26 November 1984 (aged 79); Pickering, Ontario, Canada

Bernard Joseph Francis Lonergan SJ CC (17 December 1904 – 26 November 1984) was a Canadian Jesuit priest, philosopher, and theologian regarded by many as one of the most important thinkers of the 20th century.

Lonergan's works include Insight: A Study of Human Understanding (1957) and Method in Theology (1972), as well as two studies of Thomas Aquinas, several theological textbooks, and numerous essays, including two posthumously published essays on macroeconomics. Lonergan held appointments at the Pontifical Gregorian University; Regis College, Toronto, as distinguished visiting professor at Boston College, and as Stillman Professor of Divinity at Harvard University.

== Aims ==
By his own account, Lonergan set out to do for human thought in our time what Thomas Aquinas had done for his own time. Aquinas had successfully applied Aristotelian thought to the service of a Christian understanding of the universe. Lonergan's program was to come to terms with modern scientific, historical, and hermeneutical thinking in a comparable way. He pursued this program in his two most fundamental works, Insight and Method in Theology.

One key to Lonergan's project is self-appropriation, that is, the personal discovery and personal embrace of the dynamic structure of inquiry, insight, judgment, and decision. By self-appropriation, one finds in one's own intelligence, reasonableness, and responsibility the foundation of every kind of inquiry and the basic pattern of operations undergirding methodical investigation in every field.

A second key, one which subsumes the first, is a global "turn to the idea" of functionally specialized collaboration. Lonergan's hope was that his discovery and articulation of eight dynamically-related but distinct tasks would, in good time, subsume, if not replace, the splintered and oftentimes isolated results of what he called "field specialization" and "subject specialization" that prevail in the modern university. Along the same lines, in the 1969 essay "The Future of Christianity," he wrote that the transition from "classicist culture" to "modern culture" would require "a complete restructuring of Catholic theology." The needed restructuring applies to all academic disciplines and all creeds.

Lonergan is often associated—with his fellow Jesuits Karl Rahner and Joseph Maréchal—with "transcendental Thomism", i.e., a philosophy which attempts to combine Thomism with certain views or methods commonly associated with Immanuel Kant's transcendental idealism. However, Lonergan did not regard this label as particularly helpful for understanding his intentions.

== Life ==
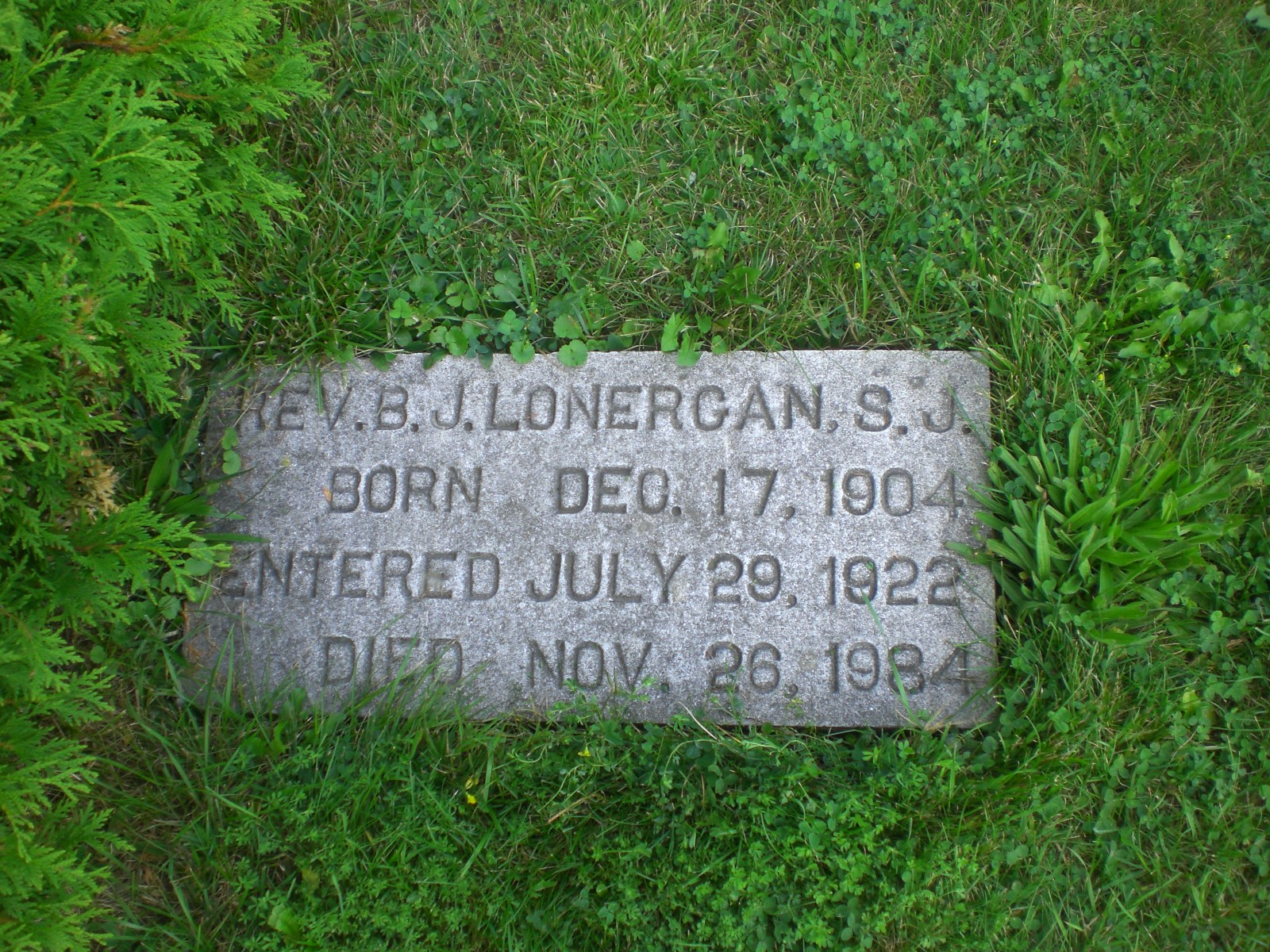
Lonergan's gravestone in the grounds of Loyola House.

Bernard Joseph Francis Lonergan was born on 17 December 1904 in Buckingham, Quebec, Canada. After four years at Loyola College (Montreal), he entered the Upper Canada (English) province of the Society of Jesus in 1922 and made his profession of vows on the Feast of St Ignatius of Loyola, 31 July 1924. After two further years of formation and education, he was assigned to study scholastic philosophy at Heythrop College, then in Oxfordshire, in 1926. Lonergan respected the competence and honesty of his professors at Heythrop, but was deeply dissatisfied with their Suarezian philosophy. While at Heythrop, Lonergan also took external degrees in mathematics and classics at the University of London. In 1930 he returned to Canada, where he taught for three years at Loyola College, Montreal.

In 1933, Lonergan was sent for theological studies at the Pontifical Gregorian University in Rome. He was ordained to the Catholic priesthood in 1936. After a year of Jesuit formation ("tertianship") in Amiens, Lonergan returned to the Gregorian University in 1937 to pursue doctoral studies in theology. Due to the Second World War, he returned to Canada in May 1940, just two days before the scheduled defence of his doctoral dissertation. He began teaching theology at College de l'Immaculee Conception, the Jesuit theology faculty in Montreal in 1940, as well as the Thomas More Institute in 1945–46. In the event, he would not formally defend his dissertation and receive his doctorate until a special board of examiners from the Immaculee Conception was convened in Montreal on 23 December 1946.

Lonergan taught theology at Regis College (a theological school attached to the University of Toronto) from 1947 to 1953, and at the Gregorian University from 1953 to 1964. At the Gregorian, Lonergan taught Trinity and Christology in alternate years, and produced substantial textbooks on these topics. In 1964, he made another hasty return to North America, this time to be treated for lung cancer. He was appointed again to Regis College from 1965 to 1975, was Stillman Professor of Divinity at Harvard University in 1971–72, and distinguished visiting professor at Boston College from 1975 until 1983. He died at the Jesuit infirmary in Pickering, Ontario, on 26 November 1984.

== Influences ==
Lonergan described the genesis of his thought up to the mid-1950s in an interview. Augustine and John Henry Newman were major influences upon his early thinking. J. A. Stewart's study of Plato's doctrine of ideas was also influential.

In the epilogue to Insight, Lonergan mentions the important personal transformation wrought in him by a decade's apprenticeship to the thought of Thomas Aquinas. He produced two major exegetical studies of Thomas Aquinas: Grace and Freedom, and Verbum: Word and Idea in Aquinas.

== Works ==
The University of Toronto Press has published Lonergan's work in a 25-volume series, Collected Works of Bernard Lonergan.

=== Grace and Freedom ===
Lonergan's doctoral dissertation was an exploration of the theory of operative grace in the thought of Thomas Aquinas. His director, Charles Boyer, S.J., pointed him to a passage in the Summa theologiae and suggested that the received interpretations were mistaken. A study of Thomas Aquinas on divine grace and human freedom was well-suited to his interest in working out a theoretical analysis of history. The dissertation was completed in 1940; it was rewritten and published as a series of articles in the journal Theological Studies. The articles were edited into a book by J. Patout Burns in 1972, and both the revised and the original version of his study were subsequently published in his Collected Works as Grace and Freedom: Operative Grace in the thought of St. Thomas Aquinas.

=== Verbum: Word and Idea in Aquinas ===
After his return from Rome, Lonergan wrote a series of four articles for Theological Studies on the inner word in Thomas Aquinas which became highly influential in the study of St. Thomas' accounts of knowledge and cognition. The articles were later collected and published under the title Verbum: Word and Idea in Aquinas.

=== Insight: A Study of Human Understanding ===
In 1945 Lonergan gave a course at the Thomas More Institute in Montreal that extended from September to April 1946 entitled "Thought and Reality," and the success of that course was the inspiration behind his decision to write the book Insight. While teaching theology at Collegium Christi Regis, now Regis College affiliated with the University of Toronto, Lonergan wrote Insight: A Study of Human Understanding, inaugurating the generalized empirical method (GEM). GEM belongs to the movement of "transcendental Thomism" inaugurated by Joseph Maréchal. This method begins with an analysis of human knowing as divided into three levels – experience, understanding, and judgment – and, by stressing the objectivity of judgment more than Kant had done, develops a Thomistic vision of Being as the goal of the dynamic openness of the human spirit.

=== Method in Theology ===
In 1972, Lonergan published Method in Theology, which distinguishes eight groups of operations ("functional specialties") in theology. Indeed, method is a phenomenon which applies across the board in all disciplines and realms of consciousness. Through his work on method, Lonergan aimed, among other things, to establish a firm basis for agreement and progress in disciplines such as philosophy and theology. Lonergan believed that the lack of an agreed method among scholars in such fields has inhibited substantive agreement from being reached and progress from being made, whereas in the natural sciences, for example, widespread agreement among scholars on the scientific method has enabled remarkable progress. The chapter on "Religious Commitment" in Method in Theology was delivered in a lecture at The Villanova University Symposium and published in: The Pilgrim People: A Vision with Hope, Volume IV (ed. Joseph Papin, Villanova University Press, 1970). Karl Rahner, S.J., however, criticized Lonergan's theological method in a short article entitled: "Some Critical Thoughts on 'Functional Specialties in Theology'" where he states: "Lonergan's theological methodology seems to me to be so generic that it really fits every science, and hence is not the methodology of theology as such, but only a very general methodology of science." In fact, by the time of writing Method in Theology, Lonergan had recognized that his proposal was along interdisciplinary lines. Moreover, his proposal was intended to move theology off a "list of academic disciplines" by appealing to patterns of operations yielding progress in "successful sciences." Lonergan's thinking in Method was, indeed, inspirational in bringing theology and psychology together in a unique way, e.g., Bernard J. Tyrrell, "Christotherapy: A Theology of Christian Healing and Enlightenment Inspired by the Thought of Thomas Hora and Bernard Lonergan" in The Papin Festschrift: Wisdom and Knowledge, Essays in Honour of Joseph Papin, Volume II (ed. Joseph Armenti, Villanova University Press, 1976, pp. 293–329).

=== Trinitarian theology ===
While at the Gregorian University, Lonergan composed a two-volume Latin textbook, De Deo Trino (third edition, 1964). It has recently appeared in the Collected Works together with an interleaf English translation under the title The Triune God: Doctrines (2009) and The Triune God: Systematics (2007).

In The Triune God: Doctrines, Lonergan begins with an examination of the dialectical process by which the dogma of the Trinity developed in the first four centuries. This section was previously published in English as The Way to Nicea. The second section of the work advances dogmatic theses on (1) the consubstantiality of the Son with the Father, (2) the divinity of the Holy Spirit, (3) the distinction of the divine persons by relations of origin, and (4) the procession of the Holy Spirit from the Father and the Son (the Filioque). The fifth and final thesis is that the Trinity is a theological mystery in the strict sense and can only be understood analogically. A concluding scholion presents New Testament evidence in favor of the "psychological" analogy of the Trinity.

In The Triune God: Systematics, Lonergan develops the theory of intelligible (or spiritual) emanations in God as propounded by Thomas Aquinas. The volume begins with a discussion of the method of systematic theology which seeks an imperfect but highly fruitful understanding of the mysteries of faith by means of analogies. The following chapters develop an analogical conception of the divine processions (as intelligible emanations), relations, persons, and the two missions of the Word and Spirit.

=== Christology ===
Lonergan produced two textbooks in Christology. In 1956 he produced a supplemental volume De Constitutione Christi Ontologica et Psychica; the fourth and final edition of 1964 was presented in the Collected Works with an interleaf translation as The Ontological and Psychological Constitution of Christ (2002). Lonergan clarifies the metaphysical principles of Christ's constitution as one person in two distinct natures, and transposes that framework to address the consciousness of Christ as a single subject of two distinct conscious subjectivities.

Beginning with an edition of 1960, Lonergan introduced his own textbook for his Christology course, De Verbo Incarnato. Subsequent editions were published in 1961 and in 1964. De Verbo Incarnato is divided into four parts. The first part is an interpretation of the divinity and humanity of Christ as presented in the New Testament (thesis 1). The second part recapitulates the formation of the dogmatic theological tradition of Christology up through the monothelite controversy in the seventh century (theses 2–5). The third part, which covers much the same material as The Constitution of Christ but in a somewhat different manner, formulates what Lonergan calls "theological conclusions" from the hypostatic union regarding the ontological constitution of Christ as one person in two natures (theses 6–9), and his psychological constitution as a single subject of two subjectivities (thesis 10). The fourth part concerns "what belongs to Christ" (de iis quae christi sunt), including his grace, knowledge, sinlessness, and freedom (theses 11–14). The fifth and final section regards the redemptive work of Christ, in three theses: redemption in the New Testament (thesis 15), the satisfaction given by Christ (thesis 16), and "Understanding the Mystery: The Law of the Cross," presenting Lonergan's synthetic understanding of Christ's work (thesis 17).

He also produced a separate treatise on the Redemption, of uncertain date and never published. This treatise treats, in six chapters divided into 45 articles, good and evil, divine justice, the death and resurrection of Christ, the cross of Christ, the satisfaction given by Christ, and the work of Christ.

Among Lonergan's more noteworthy contributions to Christology include his theory about the ontological and psychological constitution of Christ, his interpretation of Christ's human knowing, and his interpretation of Christ's redemptive work.

Both De Verbo Incarnato and the supplement on Redemption are in preparation for the Collected Works. The plan is to present two volumes, The Incarnate Word, which would include theses 1–14 in Latin with an interleaf English translation, and The Redemption, which would include theses 15–17 and the supplement on Redemption.

=== Macroeconomics ===
In the 1930s and early 1940s, Lonergan developed an intense interest in macroeconomic analysis, but never published the manuscript he developed. In later life while teaching at Boston College, Lonergan returned his attention to the economic interests of his younger days. From 1978 until 1983, Lonergan taught the course "Macroeconomics and the Dialectic of History" at Boston College for one semester each year. The University of Toronto Press has published his two works on economics: For a New Political Economy and Macroeconomic Dynamics: An Essay in Circulation Analysis

== Philosophy: generalized empirical method ==
Lonergan described his philosophical program as a generalization of empirical method (GEM) to investigate not only data given through exterior sensation, but also the internal data of consciousness. More specifically, objects are known while considering the corresponding operations of the subject and vice versa, experiencing and the subsequent operations of the intellect being components of both knowing and reality. Method, for Lonergan, is not a technique but a concrete pattern of operations. Lonergan broke down his empirical method into four stages, which he phrased as "precepts": "Be attentive, be intelligent, be reasonable, be responsible." A fifth precept, "be loving," connected the philosophical framing of the first four to Lonergan's work as a theologian, and the five together he called "transcendental precepts".

Lonergan maintained what he called critical realism. By realism, he affirmed that we make true judgments of fact and of value, and by critical, he based knowing and valuing in a critique of consciousness. GEM traces to their roots in consciousness the sources of all the meanings and values that make up personality, social orders, and historical developments. A more thorough overview of Lonergan's work is available at the Internet Encyclopedia of Philosophy.

Lonergan's ideas include radical unintelligibility, theological critical realism, and functional specialization. Given the fact that no science can today be mastered by a single individual, Lonergan advocated sub-division of the scientific process in all fields. One of the leading voices in the effort to implement functional specialization was Philip McShane.

== Hermeneutics ==
Frederick G. Lawrence has made the claim that Lonergan's work may be seen as the culmination of the postmodern hermeneutic revolution begun by Martin Heidegger. Heidegger replaced Edmund Husserl's phenomenology of pure perception with his own linguistic phenomenology. Hans-Georg Gadamer worked out this seminal insight into his philosophical hermeneutics. According to Lawrence, however, Heidegger, and in a lesser way, Gadamer, remained under the influence of Kant when they refused to take seriously the possibility of grace and redemption. Lawrence makes the observation that Heidegger—influenced also by Augustine's inability to work out a theoretical distinction between grace and freedom—conflated finitude and fallenness in his account of the human being. "Sin" is therefore absorbed into "fallenness," and fallenness is simply part of the human condition. Lonergan builds on the "theorem of the supernatural" achieved in medieval times, as well as on the distinction between grace and freedom worked out by Thomas Aquinas, and so is able to remove all the brackets and return to the truly concrete with a unique synthesis of "Jerusalem and Athens."

== Honours ==
In 1970, he was made a Companion of the Order of Canada.

In 1971, Loyola College, one of Concordia University's founding institutions, awarded him the Loyola Medal. Concordia also awarded Lonergan an honorary doctorate in 1977.

== Conferences and journals ==
An annual Lonergan Workshop is held at Boston College, under the leadership of Frederick G. Lawrence. The proceedings of the Workshop are published under the same name, Lonergan Workshop, edited by Frederick G. Lawrence. The Workshop began in Lonergan's lifetime and continued after his death. The West Coast Methods Institute sponsors the annual Fallon Memorial Lonergan Symposium at Loyola Marymount University. The Lonergan Symposium has been meeting for 32 years.

Boston College has a Lonergan Institute, and also publishes the bi-annual Method: Journal of Lonergan Studies. The journal was founded, and edited until 2013, by Mark D. Morelli. The Lonergan Studies Newsletter is put out four times a year by the Lonergan Research Institute, Toronto; it provides the most up-to-date bibliographical information on the Lonergan movement. Recently, Seton Hall University has put out The Lonergan Review.

Lonergan Centres have been set up in various places (see below, External links). The Lonergan Research Institute at Toronto holds the Lonergan archives as well as a good collection of secondary material, including a complete collection of dissertations on Lonergan's work. Much of the primary archival material is available online at the Bernard Lonergan Archive (see below, External links), and a site for secondary material has also been set up, thanks to the work of Robert M. Doran.
