= List of Boston College people =

Stemming from its nickname as "The Heights," persons affiliated with Boston College have been referred to as Heightsmen, Heightswomen, Heightsonians and Eagles, the latter in reference to the university's mascot, the Eagle. The following is a partial list of notable alumni and faculty.

== Notable Boston College alumni ==
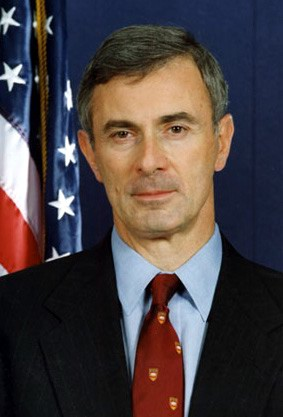
Paul Cellucci '70, JD '73

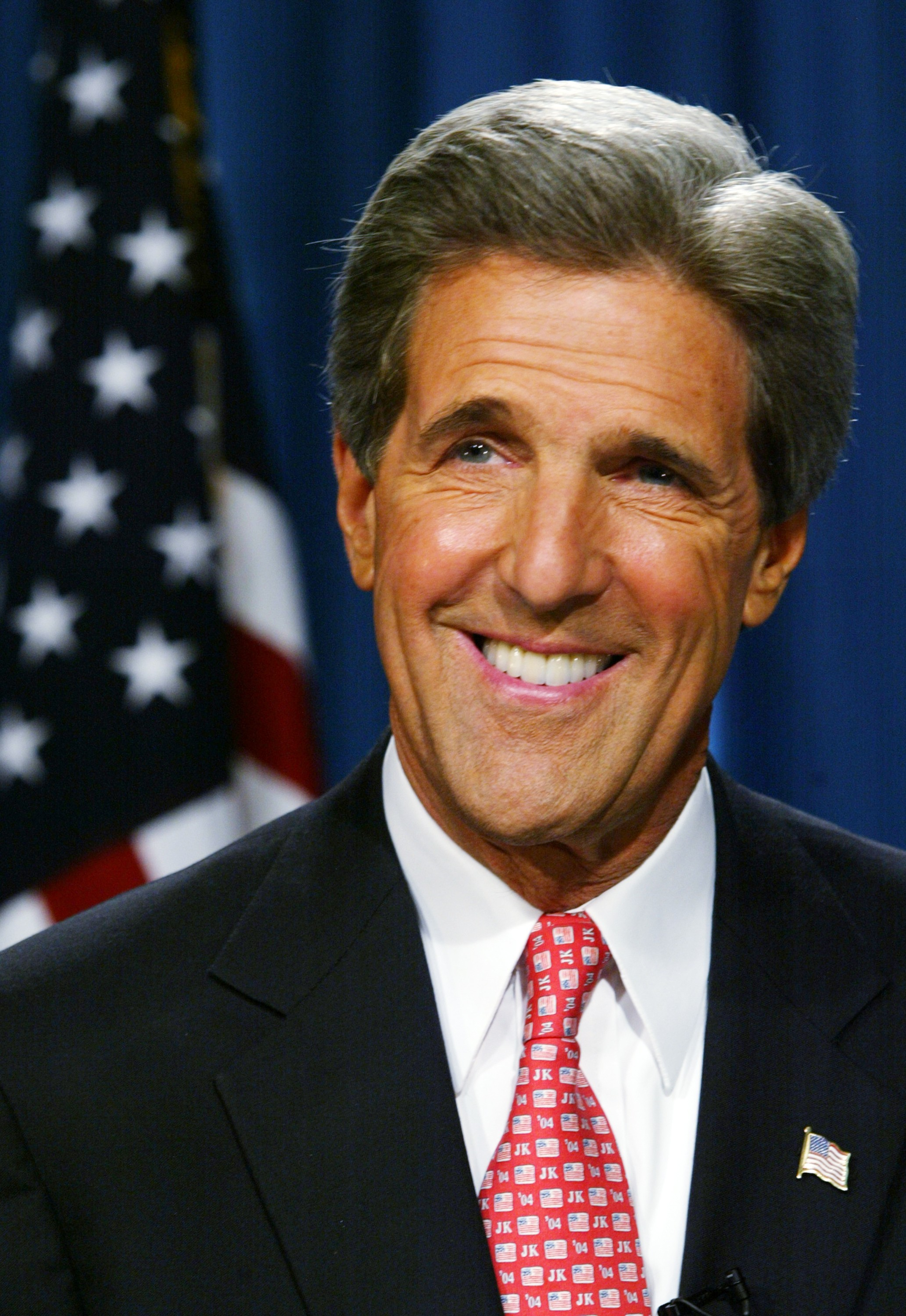
John Kerry JD '76

=== Arts and literature ===
- Gretchen Andrew, 2010, painter and search engine artist
- James Balog, 1974, photographer
- Joseph Bottum, Ph.D. 1994, writer
- Brendan Galvin, 1960, 76 poet, 2005 National Book Award finalist
- George V. Higgins, 1961, J.D. 1967, novelist
- Mary Elizabeth Hirsh, novelist
- Joseph McLellan, 1951, M.A. 1953, music critic, The Washington Post
- Mark Mulvoy, 1964, journalist and writer for The Boston Globe and Sports Illustrated
- Brian Murphy, nonfiction writer, essayist
- Charlie Pierce (born 1953), writer/journalist, and panelist on NPR's Wait Wait... Don't Tell Me; attended for two days
- David Plante, 1961, novelist
- Maurice Sagoff, poet
- Mary Sherman, artist and curator
- Elliot Silverstein, 1949, director; president, Artists Rights Foundation
- Karen Sosnoski, author, radio contributor and filmmaker
- C. Dale Young, 1991, poet, physician, editor

=== Business ===
- Nikesh Arora, 1995, president, Global Sales Operations and Business Development, Google
- Richard Berman, J.D. 1969, CEO, NexMed
- Wayne Budd, 1963, executive vice president, John Hancock Financial Services
- Kathleen Corbet, 1982, CEO, fixed income division, Alliance Capital Management
- Robert B. Ford, chief executive officer of Abbott Laboratories
- Stephen L. Green, J.D. 1962, founder of S.L. Green Realty
- Charlie Jacobs, principal, Boston Bruins, Delaware North Companies
- Christopher G. Kennedy, 1986, president of Merchandise Mart Properties, Inc., a subsidiary of Vornado Realty Trust; son of Robert F. Kennedy
- Ronald Logue, S.B. 1967, M.B.A. 1974, chairman and former CEO, State Street Corporation
- David H. Long, CEO of Liberty Mutual Group
- Karen S. Lynch, 1984, president and CEO of CVS Health
- Peter Lynch, 1965, mutual fund manager for Fidelity
- John Mara, 1976, president, CEO, and co-owner, New York Giants
- Harry Markopolos, 1997, Bernard Madoff whistleblower to SEC
- Anupam Mittal, 1997, founder and director, Shaadi.com
- Denise Morrison, 1975, president and CEO, Campbell's
- Denis O'Brien, MBA 1982, chairman, Digicel
- Philip W. Schiller, B.S. 1982, vice president of Apple Computer
- Bill Simon, J.D. 1982, businessman and former gubernatorial candidate in California
- Patrick Stokes, 1964, president, Anheuser-Busch
- Richard Syron, 1966, chairman, president and CEO, Thermo Electron Corporation; currently CEO of Freddie Mac
- Thomas Vanderslice, 1953, CEO of Apollo Computer and CEO of M/A-COM
- Peter Zaffino, 1989, chairman and CEO, AIG

=== Education ===
- Harold Attridge, 1967, dean, Divinity School, Yale University
- William Bulger, 1958, professor, Boston College; former president of University of Massachusetts
- Barry Corey, Ph.D. 1992, president of Biola University
- Peter Dervan, 1967, former chairman, division of chemistry and chemical engineering, California Institute of Technology
- Robert Drinan, SJ, 1942, former dean, Boston College Law School
- Francis Kilcoyne, president of Brooklyn College
- Paul J. LeBlanc, president, Southern New Hampshire University; former president of Marlboro College
- Brian Linnane, SJ, 1977, president, Loyola University Maryland
- Joseph M. McShane, SJ, 1972, president, Fordham University, former president of the University of Scranton
- Ernest Moniz, 1966, United States secretary of Energy under Barack Obama; chair, Physics Department, MIT; director, Bates Linear Accelerator
- J. Keith Motley, Ph.D. 1999, chancellor, University of Massachusetts Boston; first African-American chancellor of UMass Boston
- Vincent Phillip Muñoz (MA 1995), Tocqueville Associate Professor of Religion & Public Life in the Department of Political Science at the University of Notre Dame
- Thomas P. O'Malley, SJ, 1951, former president, John Carroll and Loyola Marymount universities
- Michael P. Walsh, SJ, 1929, former president, Boston College and Fordham University

=== Entertainment ===
- Ayla Brown, 2010, singer, American Idol
- P. J. Byrne, 1996, film and television actor of Horrible Bosses, Final Destination 5, The Legend of Korra and The Game
- Flora Chan, 1991, Hong Kong television and film actress
- Jodi Cilley, producer
- Teddy Dunn, JD 2013, actor best known for portraying Duncan Kane on Veronica Mars
- Cameron Esposito, 2004, comedian
- Craig Finn, 1993, lead singer of The Hold Steady (and formerly Lifter Puller)
- Maile Flanagan, 1987, voice actress for Naruto
- Gary Gulman, 1993, comedian, runner-up in 2004's Last Comic Standing
- Alison Haislip, 2003, actress, TV host of Attack of the Show
- Elisabeth Hasselbeck, 1999, former reality show contestant on Survivor: The Australian Outback, former co-host of talk show The View; host on Fox & Friends
- Christine Kane, singer-songwriter
- Clinton Kelly, 1991, co-host of TLC's What Not to Wear,; co-host of ABC's The Chew; former magazine editor
- Kofi Kingston, professional wrestler
- Tom McCarthy, 1988, actor, writer, and director; directed and co-wrote Academy Award Best Picture and Best Original Screenplay winner Spotlight
- Edwin McDonough, actor
- Ed McMahon, TV host and personality
- Mike Najarian, drummer, State Radio
- Eric Nam, 2011, Korean singer and entertainer
- Leonard Nimoy, 1952, actor
- Chris O'Donnell, 1992, actor
- Ellis Paul, 1987, singer/songwriter
- PH-1, 1989, Korean singer and rapper
- Bryce Pinkham, stage and screen actor
- Amy Poehler, 1993, repertory player for Saturday Night Live and Upright Citizens Brigade; star of Parks and Recreation
- Greg Poehler, 1996, creator and star of Welcome to Sweden
- Rikishi, 1988, born Solofa F. Fatu Jr., professional wrestler
- Alex Riley, 2002, professional wrestler and actor
- David Smalley, 1985, singer for All, Dag Nasty, and DYS
- Skylar Spence, 2015, musician
- Tim Stack, 1978, actor
- Lori Trespicio, 2001, Real World X cast member, singer, writer
- Nancy Walls, 1988, comedian, wife of Steve Carell
- Lulu Wang, 2005, filmmaker
- Tracey Wigfield, 2005, comedy writer
- Wayne Wilderson, 1989, actor

=== Law, politics, and public service ===
- Ashleigh Aitken, B.A., mayor of Anaheim, California
- Bruce Ayers, member of the Massachusetts House of Representatives (1998–present)
- Peter Blute, B.A. 1978, former United States congressman and radio talk show host
- Edward P. Boland, J.D. 1936, former United States congressman; author of the Boland Amendment
- Julio Borges, M.A. 1994, 8th President of the Venezuelan National Assembly (2017–2018)
- Garrett J. Bradley, BA 1992 & JD 1995, member of the Mass. House of Representatives (2001–2016)
- Joseph Brennan, 1958, former governor of Maine, former United States congressman
- Scott Brown, J.D. 1985, former Massachusetts state senator; United States Senator
- Wayne Budd, 1963, former United States Associate Attorney General
- William M. Bulger, J.D. 1961, former president of the Massachusetts state senate and former president of the University of Massachusetts
- R. Nicholas Burns, 1978, U.S. under secretary of state for Political Affairs, board member of the Council on Foreign Relations, former US ambassador to NATO, former US ambassador to Greece
- Andrea Cabral, 1981, sheriff of Suffolk County, Boston, Massachusetts; first woman and first African-American to hold the position
- Mike Capuano, J.D. 1977, United States congressman
- Edward Cashman, A.B. 1965, district court judge, State of Vermont
- Paul Cellucci, 1970, J.D. 1973, former governor of Massachusetts, former US ambassador to Canada
- Robert W. Clifford, J.D. 1962, Maine Supreme Court justice
- John Cogliano, 1987, Massachusetts secretary of transportation
- David Condon, 1996, mayor of Spokane, Washington
- John Connolly, former FBI agent, currently incarcerated stemming from his relationship with James J. "Whitey" Bulger
- Silvio Conte, 1949, J.D. 1949, former U.S. congressman
- W. Edward Crockett, MBA 1986, member of the Maine House of Representatives
- John Curtin, 1954, former president, American Bar Association
- Bill Delahunt, J.D. 1967, U.S. congressman
- Sal DiDomenico, 1997, member of the Massacusetts Senate
- Salvatore DiMasi, 1967, speaker of the Massachusetts House of Representatives
- John Dooley, LL.B 1968, Vermont Supreme Court justice
- Robert Drinan, SJ, 1942, former United States congressman, human rights advocate; only Catholic priest to serve in Congress
- Joseph R. Driscoll Jr., BA, member of the Mass. House of Representatives (2003–2011)
- Mark V. Falzone, B.A., member of the Mass. House of Representatives (2001–2011)
- John F. "Honey Fitz" Fitzgerald, 1885, First Irish-Catholic mayor of Boston, grandfather of John F. Kennedy
- Martin Foncello, B.S., MBA, member of the Connecticut House of Representatives
- Linda Dorcena Forry, 1996, second Haitian-American Massachusetts state representative
- Keith Francis, B.A. 1976, world-class track athlete, senior analyst, ATF and Boston College trustee (2010–2011)
- William F. Galvin, 1972, Massachusetts secretary of state; 2006 Massachusetts gubernatorial candidate
- Joseph L. Gormley, 1937, M.A. 1939, FBI agent
- Mareva Grabowski-Mitsotakis, B.A., Greek business executive and spouse of the prime minister of Greece
- Anne P. Graham, 1981, B.S. Maine House of Representatives
- Michael S. Greco, J.D. 1972, president, American Bar Association
- Patrick Guerriero, MA 1992, executive director, Log Cabin Republicans
- Ken Hackett, B.A. 1968, president of Catholic Relief Services
- Jane D. Hartley, B.A., U.S. ambassador to France
- Margaret Heckler, J.D. 1956, former United States congresswoman, former US secretary of Health and Human Services, former US ambassador to Ireland
- Charles F. Hurley, 1913, governor of Massachusetts
- Cheryl Jacques, 1984, first openly gay state senator in Massachusetts; former president, Human Rights Campaign
- Sean M. Joyce, deputy director of the Federal Bureau of Investigation
- Karim Kawar, 1987, Jordanian ambassador to the United States
- Bill Keating, 1974, MBA 1982, United States congressman
- John Kerry, J.D. 1976, United States secretary of state, former United States senator, 2004 Democratic candidate for president of the United States
- Edward J. King, 1948, former governor of Massachusetts and professional football player
- Pat LaMarche, 1982, Maine gubernatorial candidate, 2004 Green Party vice-presidential candidate
- Wayne LaPierre, M.A., executive vice president of the NRA
- Stephen Lynch, 1991, United States congressman
- Dannel P. Malloy, 1977, J.D. 1980, governor of Connecticut
- Ed Markey, 1968, J.D. '72, United States congressman
- Maeve Kennedy McKean, attorney and public health official in the Obama Administration
- Ernest Moniz, 1966, 13th United States secretary of Energy
- Tip O'Neill, 1936, former speaker of the United States House of Representatives
- Grace Poe, B.A. 1991, former chair of the Movie and Television Review and Classification Board in the Philippines; senator of the Republic of the Philippines
- Pierre-Richard Prosper, 1985, United States ambassador-at-large for War Crimes Issues
- Mike Rawlings, 1976, mayor of Dallas, Texas
- Thomas Reilly J.D. 1970, attorney general of Massachusetts, 2006 Massachusetts gubernatorial candidate
- Warren Rudman, J.D. 1960, former United States senator and New Hampshire attorney general
- Michael Rustad, Ph.D, intellectual property author, professor at Suffolk University Law School
- R.T. Rybak, 1978, mayor of Minneapolis, Minnesota
- Marie St. Fleur, J.D. 1987, Massachusetts state representative; first Haitian-American elected to the Massachusetts Legislature; 2006 Massachusetts lieutenant gubernatorial candidate
- Thomas P. Salmon, 1954, J.D. '57, former governor of Vermont
- James Sandman, B.A. 1973
- Bobby Scott, J.D. 1973, United States congressman
- Francis X. Spina, J.D. 1971, Massachusetts Supreme Court justice
- Michael A. Sullivan, 1982, J.D. '85, mayor of Cambridge, Massachusetts
- Michael J. Sullivan, 1979, United States attorney for the District of Massachusetts; 2006 Massachusetts lieutenant gubernatorial candidate
- Tom Suozzi, B.S. 1984, mayor of Glen Cove, Nassau County county executive, and current United States congressman for NY-3
- Amul Thapar, 1991, judge, United States Court of Appeals for the Sixth Circuit (2017-?)
- Maurice J. Tobin, 1922, former mayor of Boston, former governor of Massachusetts, former US secretary of the Department of Labor
- Marty Walsh, mayor of Boston, 2014–2021
- Walter E. Webber, 1969, Masonic leader
- Kevin White, 1955, former mayor of Boston; longest serving
- Diane Wilkerson, J.D. 1981, first African-American Massachusetts state senator
- Barbara Wright, B.S., member of the New Jersey General Assembly
- Debra Wong Yang, J.D. 1984, United States attorney for the Central District of California

=== Media and communication ===
- Tom Bowman, M.A., Pentagon reporter, National Public Radio
- Alina Cho, 1993, broadcast news reporter, CNN
- John Charles Daly, journalist, host, CBS radio and television personality, ABC News executive
- Jack Griffin, 1982, publisher, Parade magazine
- Elisabeth Filarski Hasselbeck, 1999, co-host, The View, ABC
- Jack King, NASA public affairs officer
- Paul LaCamera, MBA 1983, president and general manager, WCVB-TV/Boston
- Steve Lacy, 1997, anchor, reporter, WCVB-TV/Boston
- Mike Lupica, 1974, author; sports columnist, New York Daily News
- Julianne Malveaux, 1974, M.A. '76, nationally syndicated columnist, author, producer
- Drew Massey, 1992, founder and publisher of P.O.V. magazine; founder of ManiaTV!
- John McLaughlin, M.A. 1961, executive producer and host of The McLaughlin Group, PBS
- Leo Monahan, 1950, sports journalist and recipient of the Elmer Ferguson Memorial Award
- Brian Murphy, religion editor, Associated Press
- Frederick Pratson, 1957, travel writer
- Mel Robbins, 1994, television show host and motivational speaker
- Luke Russert, 2008, congressional correspondent, NBC News
- Bob Ryan, 1968, sports columnist for the Boston Globe
- Herb Scannell, 1979, president, MTV Networks, Nickelodeon Networks
- Jon Sciambi, 1992, ESPN sports broadcaster
- Lesley Visser, 1975, sports broadcaster, ESPN
- Dave Wedge, 1993, author, journalist, VICE, Boston Strong, Boston Herald
- William O. Wheatley Jr., 1966, former Emmy Award-winning executive producer of NBC Nightly News; executive vice president, NBC News

=== Religion ===
- Timothy P. Broglio, 1973, archbishop, Archdiocese for the Military Services, USA
- Richard James Cushing, 1917, cardinal-archbishop of Boston
- Robert Drinan, SJ, 1942, human rights advocate, Jesuit priest who served in the United States House of Representatives (1971–1981) and the first of two Catholic priests to ever have served in the US House
- Gregory John Hartmayer, O.F.M. Conv., M.Ed, 1992, archbishop of Atlanta
- Jeffry Korgen, Catholic writer and comic creator
- Frederick G. Lawrence, scholar of Bernard Lonergan
- Richard Lennon, 1969, bishop of Cleveland
- Gerasimos Michaleas, M.A. 1986, Ph.D. 1993, Metropolitan of San Francisco; archbishop, Greek Orthodox Archdiocese of America
- John Courtney Murray, 1926, M.A. 1927, prominent Jesuit theologian, architect of Vatican II
- Mark O'Connell, 1986, auxiliary bishop of Boston
- William Henry O'Connell, 1881, cardinal-archbishop of Boston
- Fachtna O'Driscoll, superior general of the Society of African Missions worldwide, 2013–2019
- Deidre Palmer, Ph.D. 1989, president of the Uniting Church in Australia since 8 July 2018
- Edward Phillips, Eastern Deanery AIDS Relief Program, Archdiocese of Nairobi
- Francis A. Sullivan, SJ, 1944, M.A. 1945, Jesuit theologian and ecclesiologist

=== Science, technology, and medicine ===
- Rosina Bierbaum, B.S. and B.A. 1974, dean at the University of Michigan School of Natural Resources and Environment and member of the National Science and Technology Council under Bill Clinton and Barack Obama
- Jane A. Cauley (MPH 1980, DrPH 1983), epidemiologist, University of Pittsburgh Cancer Institute
- Joseph L. Gormley, 1937, M.A. 1939, former chief of chemistry and toxicology for the FBI
- Philip J. Landrigan, epidemiologist and pediatrician
- George D. LeMaitre, B.A. 1955, vascular surgeon, author, and surgical device inventor
- Matthew Liebmann, B.A. 1996, archaeologist
- Aleksandar Totic, 1988, co-founder and former partner, Netscape
- Kevin J. Tracey, 1979, neurosurgeon and immunologist

=== Economics ===
- Welles Crowther, 1999, equities trader who saved more than a dozen people during the September 11 attacks on the World Trade Center, during which he died
- Elizabeth Ellis Hoyt (1893–1980), economist, considered the inventor of the modern day Consumer Price Index
- Martha MacDonald, president of the International Association for Feminist Economics 2007–2008
- James Markusen, Distinguished Professor (emeritus) at the University of Colorado, Boulder
- Stephen P. Murray (1962–2015), private equity investor and philanthropist
- Abdisalam Omer, governor of the Central Bank of Somalia
- Joseph T. Salerno, 1972, Austrian School economist, senior fellow at the Mises Institute
- Cathy Schoen, economist at the New York Academy of Medicine, served on President Jimmy Carter's health insurance task force

=== Athletics ===
- Lior Arditti, 1991, Israeli basketball player in the Israeli Basketball Premier League
- Alejandro Bedoya, 2008, United States men's national soccer team midfielder
- Josh Beekman, 2006, NFL and UFL offensive guard
- Troy Bell, 2003, NBA point guard
- Will Blackmon, 2006, NFL defensive back
- Cal Bouchard, 2000, WNBA
- Paul Boudreau, 1973, NFL offensive line coach
- Stephen Boyd, 1995, NFL linebacker
- Brian Boyle, 2007, plays for the Rangers of the NHL
- Anthony Castonzo, 2011, NFL offensive tackle
- Mark Chmura, 1991, NFL tight end
- Scott Clemmensen, NHL goaltender
- Mike Cloud, 1998, NFL running back
- Marc Colombo, 2001, NFL offensive tackle
- Tom Condon, 1974, sports agent, called the most powerful agent in any sport by The Sporting News
- Harold Connolly, 1952, 1952 and 1956 Olympic gold medalist in the hammer throw
- Peter Cronan, 1977, played in NFL 1977–1986 as linebacker with the Seattle Seahawks and Super Bowl Champion Washington Redskins
- Tommy Cross, 2012, plays for the Columbus Blue Jackets of the NHL
- Ted Crowley, 1993, NHL and 1994 US Olympic Hockey Team defenseman
- Charlie Davies, 2007, MLS striker
- Steve DeOssie, 1984, NFL linebacker
- A. J. Dillon (born 1998), football running back for the National Football League Green Bay Packers
- Gina DiMartino, 2009, WPS forward/midfielder
- Art Donovan, 1950, NFL defensive tackle
- Jared Dudley, 2007, NBA forward
- Justin Dunn, 2016, MLB pitcher
- Patrick Eaves, 2005, NHL right wing
- Larry Eisenhauer, 1961, AFL and NFL defensive end
- Howard Eisley, 1995, NBA point guard
- David Emma, 1991, NHL right wing
- Benn Ferriero, 2009, NHL and AHL right wing
- John Fitzgerald, 1970, NFL offensive lineman
- Kenny Florian, 1999, retired professional mixed martial artist for the Ultimate Fighting Championship, Fox/UFC analyst
- Zay Flowers, 2023, NFL wide receiver
- Darren Flutie, 1988, NFL and CFL receiver
- Doug Flutie, 1985, NFL, CFL, and USFL quarterback
- Glenn Foley, 1993, NFL quarterback
- Pete Frates, 2007, baseball player; credited creator of the Ice Bucket Challenge
- Mike Gambino, 2000, Boston College baseball coach
- Antonio Garay, 2002, NFL defensive tackle
- Johnny Gaudreau, 2014, NHL forward
- Laura Georges, 2006, French football defender
- Nathan Gerbe, 2008, NHL forward
- Brian Gionta, 1997, NHL and 2006 US Olympic Hockey Team right wing
- Stephen Gionta, 2006, NHL left wing
- William Green, 1999, NFL running back
- Bill Guerin, 1991, NHL right wing
- Claudell Harris Jr., 2024, basketball player in the Israeli Basketball Premier League
- Matt Hasselbeck, 1997, NFL quarterback
- Tim Hasselbeck, 2000, ESPN analyst, former NFL quarterback
- Mark Herzlich, 2011, NFL linebacker
- Chris Hovan, 2001, NFL defensive tackle
- Frank Hussey, 1928, 1924 Olympic gold medalist in Athletics
- Reggie Jackson, 2011, NBA point guard
- Amber Jacobs, 2004, WNBA point guard
- Tyler Jewell, 1999, 2006 Olympic contender in snowboarding
- Pete Kendall, 1995, NFL guard
- Kevin Kiley Jr., 2002, professional wrestler, stage name Alex Riley
- Kofi Kingston, 2003, professional wrestler
- Mathias Kiwanuka, 2006, NFL linebacker
- Dan Koppen, 2003, NFL center
- Chris Kreider, 2012, NHL forward
- Luke Kuechly, 2012, NFL linebacker , member of the Pro Football Hall of Fame
- Brian Leetch, 1990, retired NHL defenseman
- Ronald MacDonald, 1898, second winner of the Boston Marathon
- Mike Mamula, 1995, NFL defensive end/linebacker
- Kelvin Martin, 1987, NFL wide receiver
- Mike Mayock, 1980, NFL Network analyst, former NFL safety
- Stephanie McCaffrey, 2015, NWSL forward/midfielder for the Boston Breakers
- Kristie Mewis, 2012, NWSL forward/midfielder for the Boston Breakers
- Mike Mottau, 2000, NHL defenseman
- Joe Mullen, 1978, NHL and CHL forward
- Tom Nalen, 1993, NFL center
- Brooks Orpik, 2001, NHL defenseman
- Bruce Pearl, 1982, Auburn head basketball coach and former Tennessee head basketball coach
- Gerard Phelan, 1984, NFL receiver
- Quinton Porter, 2005, CFL quarterback
- Brooke Queenan, 2006, Serbian basketball forward
- Ryan Quigley, 2012, NFL punter
- B. J. Raji, 2009, NFL defensive tackle
- Marty Reasoner, 1995, NHL center
- Kathrin Ress, 2007, WNBA forward
- Bill Romanowski, 1988, NFL linebacker
- Danny Rubin (born 1991), American-Israeli basketball player for Bnei Herzliya of the Israeli Basketball Premier League
- Mike Ruth, 1986, NFL defensive lineman
- Matt Ryan, 2008, NFL quarterback
- Sean Ryan, 2003, NFL tight end
- Brian St. Pierre, 2002, NFL quarterback
- Molly Schaus, 2011, USA hockey goaltender
- Cory Schneider, 2007, NHL goaltender
- Emmet Sheehan, 2021, MLB pitcher
- Jamie Silva, 2008, NFL safety
- Mike Siravo, 1998, NFL coach
- Fred Smerlas, 1979, NFL defensive lineman
- Craig Smith, 2006, NBA forward
- William Smith, 2023, NHL right wing for the San Jose Sharks
- Chris Snee, 2004, NFL offensive guard
- Kelli Stack, 2011, USA hockey forward
- Kevin Stevens, 1987, NHL forward
- Ron Stone, 1993, NFL offensive lineman
- Steve Strachan, 1985, NFL running back
- Karl Swanke, 1980, NFL offensive lineman
- Carolyn Swords, 2011, WNBA center
- Bill Thomas, 1971, NFL running back
- Jeremy Trueblood, 2006, NFL right tackle
- Tom Waddle, 1989, ESPN analyst and former NFL wide receiver
- Lenny Walls, 2002, NFL cornerback
- Erik Weihenmayer, 1991, mountaineer, first blind person to reach summit of Mount Everest
- Dave Widell, 1988, NFL offensive lineman
- Doug Widell, 1989, NFL offensive lineman
- Sean Williams, 2008, NBA forward/center
- Damien Woody, 1999, NFL center
- Bob Woolf, 1949, sports agent and lawyer
- Jerry York, 1967, men's hockey coach, Boston College
- Paul Zukauskas, 2001, NFL guard

== Notable Boston College faculty ==
=== Art History ===
- Sheila Blair
- Jonathan M. Bloom

=== Chemistry ===
- Amir Hoveyda, developer of the Hoveyda–Grubbs catalyst

=== Computer Science ===
- James Gips
- Nikhil Gupta

=== Eastern, Slavic, & German Studies ===
- Maxim D. Shrayer

=== Economics ===
- Ann Fetter Friedlaender
- Arthur Lewbel, noted for econometrics, consumer demand analysis

=== Education ===
- Lisa Goodman
- Carol Hurd Green
- Jacqueline Lerner
- M. Brinton Lykes
- Laura O'Dwyer

=== English ===
- Amy Boesky
- Gerald Dawe, Northern Irish; Burns Visiting Professor
- Kim Garcia
- Elizabeth Graver, author
- Paul Lewis
- Paul Mariani, author
- Suzanne Matson, author

=== Finance ===
- Alan Marcus
- Alicia Munnell, former U.S. assistant secretary of the treasury; researcher on Social Security and retirement
- Paul Romer, 2018 Nobel laureate, economic sciences
- Philip Strahan

=== History ===
- Sheila Blair, Norma Jean Calderwood University Professor of Islamic and Asian Art (2000–2018)
- Jonathan M. Bloom, Norma Jean Calderwood University Professor of Islamic and Asian Art (2000–2018)
- Robin Fleming
- Radu Florescu, distinguished Romanian historian, author of works on Vlad Dracula
- John Hume, former Northern Ireland politician, recipient of the 1998 Nobel Peace Prize
- David Northrup
- Heather Cox Richardson

=== Law ===
- Arthur Berney
- Lawrence A. Cunningham
- John H. Garvey
- Kent Greenfield
- M. Cathleen Kaveny
- Joseph P. Liu
- Vincent Rougeau

=== Management ===
- Jean M. Bartunek
- Andrew C. Boynton, dean of the Carroll School of Management
- Mary Ann Glynn
- Richard P. Nielsen

=== Mathematics ===
- Avner Ash
- Jenny Baglivo
- Elisenda Grigsby
- John H. Smith

=== Music ===
- Peter Watchorn, Australian-born harpsichordist

=== Nursing ===
- Ann Burgess, nurse, researcher, and professor
- Marjory Gordon
- Callista Roy

=== Philosophy ===
- Oliva Blanchette
- Richard Cobb-Stevens
- Mary Daly
- Richard Kearney, philosopher
- Peter Kreeft, philosopher and Catholic apologist known for his work on Thomas Aquinas, Socrates, Blaise Pascal and C. S. Lewis
- David M. Rasmussen, Continental political philosopher, editor in chief of Philosophy and Social Criticism
- Michael Resler, philologist, academic, and author
- William J. Richardson, SJ, philosopher and psychoanalyst; known for his work on Martin Heidegger
- John Sallis, philosopher within Continental philosophy and hermeneutics
- Jacques Taminiaux

=== Physics ===
- Ottavio Forte

=== Political Science ===
- Samuel Beer
- Nasser Behnegar
- Christopher Bruell
- William Bulger, former Massachusetts Senate president; former president, University of Massachusetts
- Dennis Hale, department chair 1989–1997, author of The Jury in America: Triumph and Decline
- Pierre Manent
- Robert Keating O'Neill, librarian at Burns Library at Boston College (1987–2013), former custodian of Belfast Project tapes, and adjunct professor
- Robert S. Ross, associate of the Fairbank Center for East Asian Research at Harvard University; senior advisor of the security studies program at the Massachusetts Institute of Technology; member of the Council on Foreign Relations
- Kay Lehman Schlozman
- Susan Shell
- Alan Wolfe, director, Boisi Center for Religion and American Public Life; bestselling author
- Yiyang Zhuge, popular Chinese podcaster

=== Psychology ===
- Peter Gray
- Elizabeth Kensinger
- Brinton Lykes, scholar-activist
- Katherine McAuliffe
- William Ryan, social psychologist who coined the term "blaming the victim"

=== Romance Languages & Literatures ===
- Matilda Bruckner
- Franco Mormando

=== Sociology ===
- Karen Bullock, BC professor, sociologist, clinical social worker, and academic
- Charles Derber
- William A. Gamson
- Jeanne Guillemin
- David A. Karp
- Paul Schervish
- Juliet Schor, leading expert on American consumerism, author

=== Theology ===
- Lisa Sowle Cahill, fellow of the American Academy of Arts and Sciences; former president of Catholic Theological Society of America
- M. Shawn Copeland
- Catherine Cornille
- Natana J. DeLong-Bas
- Ernest Fortin
- Roberto S. Goizueta
- Thomas Groome
- Kenneth Himes
- Michael Himes, former academic dean of the Seminary of Immaculate Conception on Long Island, New York
- James F. Keenan
- Ruth Langer, expert on Jewish liturgy
- Frederick G. Lawrence
- John J. Paris, S.J.
- Pheme Perkins, New Testament scholar; former president, Catholic Biblical Association of America
- Francis A. Sullivan
