= Lisa Goodman =

Lisa Goodman may refer to:

- Lisa Goodman (psychologist)
- Lisa Goodman (politician)
