= Benefit concert =

Type of musical benefit performance

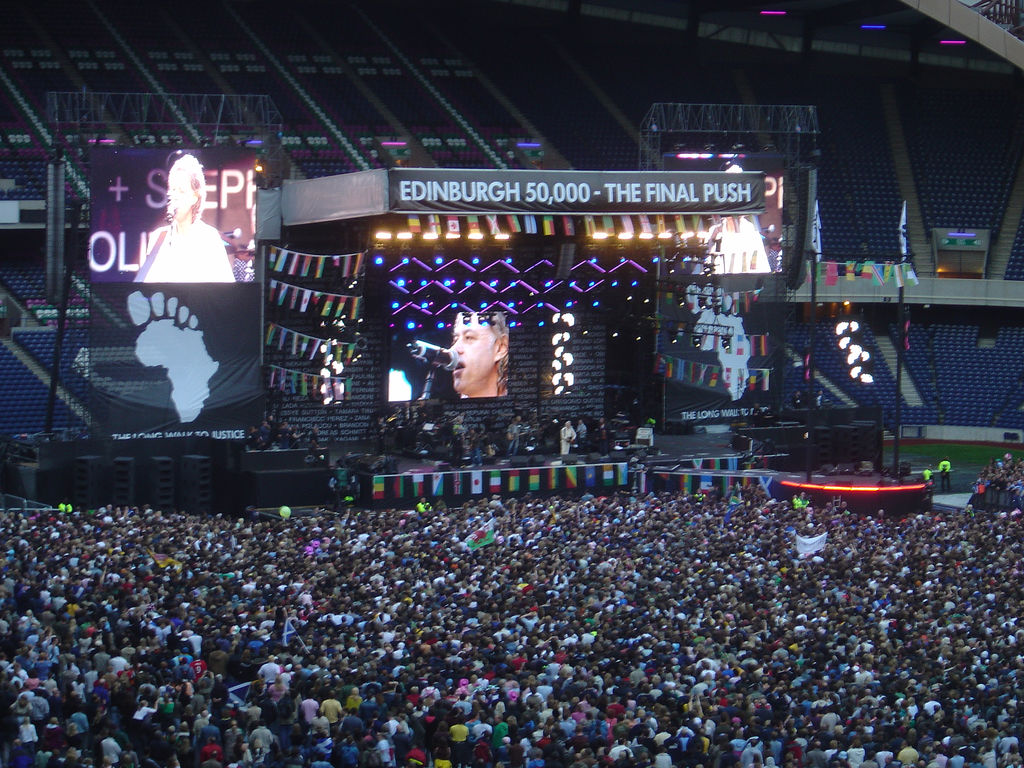
Live 8, a large, international series of benefit concerts staged in 2005

A benefit concert or charity concert is a type of musical benefit performance (e.g., concert, show, or gala) featuring musicians, comedians, or other performers that is held for a charitable purpose, often directed at a specific and immediate humanitarian crisis.

Benefit concerts can have both subjective and concrete objectives. Subjective objectives include raising awareness about an issue such as misery in Africa (such as Live 8) and uplifting a nation after a disaster (such as America: A Tribute to Heroes). Concrete objectives include raising funds (such as Live Aid) and influencing legislation (such as Live 8 or Farm Aid). The two largest benefit concerts of all time, in size, were the Live 8 and the Live Earth events, which both attracted billions of spectators. Scholars theorize that the observed increase on concert size since the Live Aid is happening because organizers strive to make their events as big as the tragedy at hand, thus hoping to gain legitimization that way.

== History ==
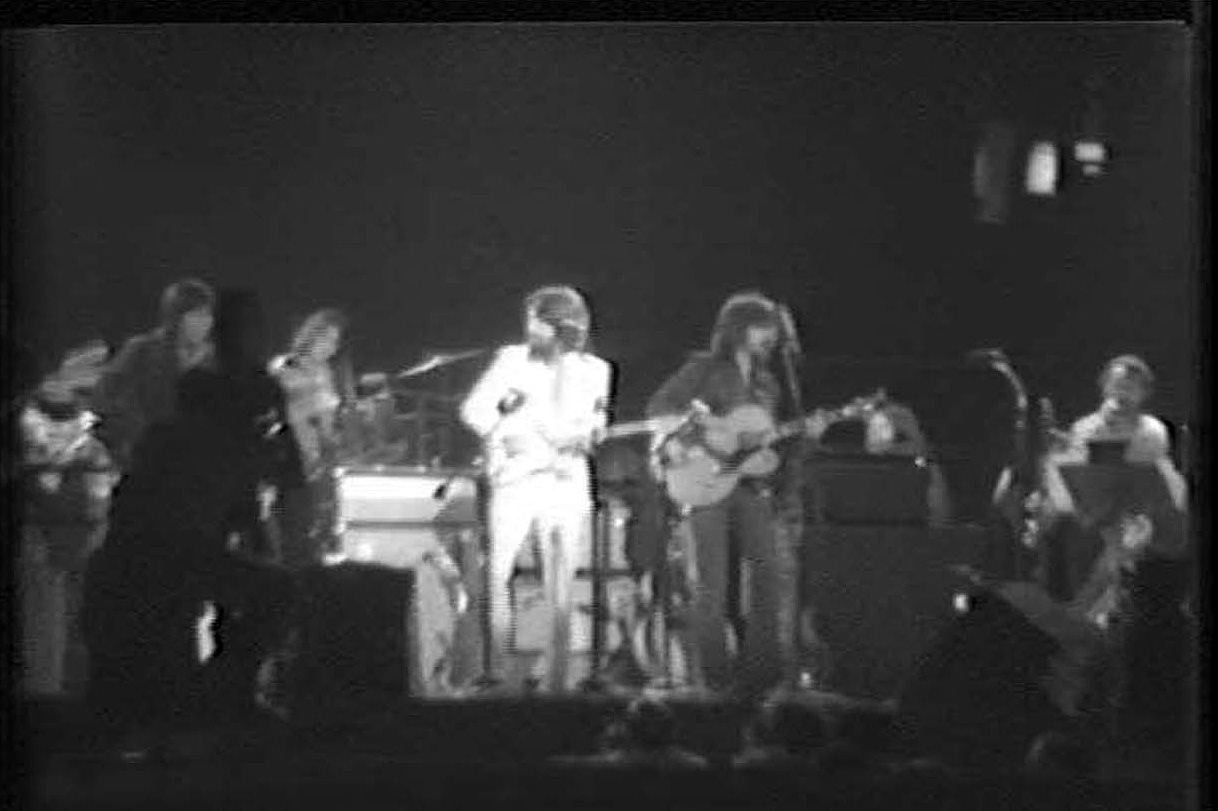
The Concert For Bangladesh (1971), the first modern, large-scale benefit concert

Examples exist in musical history of concerts being staged for philanthropic purposes. In 1749, the composer George Frideric Handel wrote his Foundling Hospital Anthem, and put on annual performances of Messiah, to support an orphans' charity in London. While many composers and performers took part in concerts to raise donations for charitable causes, it was also not unusual in the 18th and 19th centuries for musicians to stage performances to raise funds for their own professional work, such as Ludwig van Beethoven's 1808 Akademie concert.

The modern understanding of a benefit concert is of a large-scale, popular event put on to support a charitable or political cause. In the modern era, the first benefit concert is generally seen as the 1971 Concert For Bangladesh. Comprising two shows on the same day at Madison Square Garden, it was organized by and starred George Harrison and Ravi Shankar. The format of most modern benefit concerts, involving many acts, was pioneered in 1985 with Bob Geldof's Live Aid.

== Celebrity charity ==
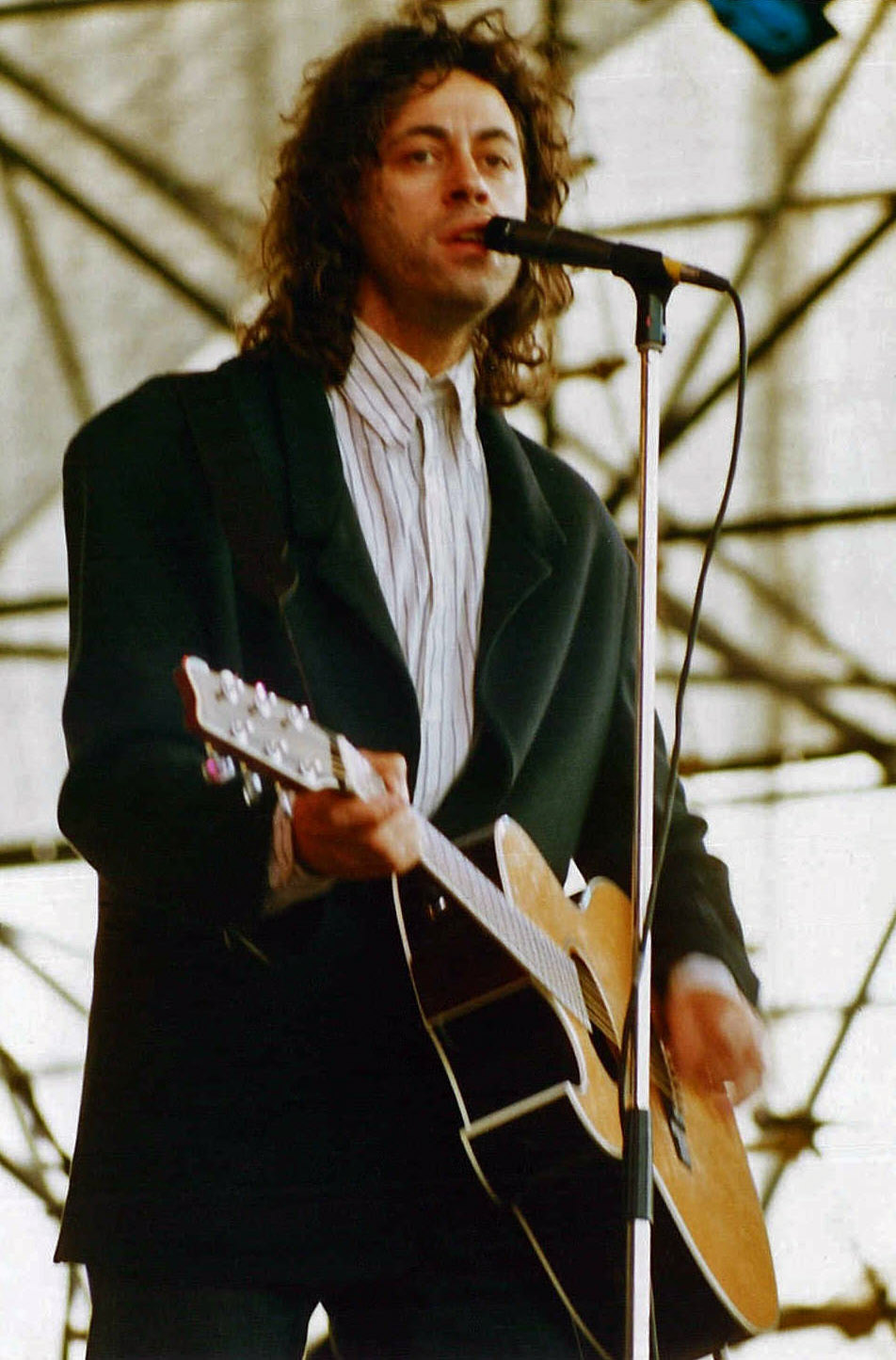
Bob Geldof, who led the Live Aid event in 1985

Benefit concerts are a major example of celebrity charity for they involve popular musicians; actors and actresses; and other kinds of entertainment figures volunteering to a greater cause. The efficiency of celebrity charity is explained by the theory of Catalytic Philanthropy designed by Paul Schervish. His thesis explains that it is more beneficial to a cause that celebrities do not contribute by only donating their money, but by participating in event like benefit concerts. That way stars can inspire hundreds of thousands of others to give.

The presence of celebrities can draw criticism, but that is outweighed by the benefits. Some argue that pop stars only take part in charity to improve their public image. That, arguably, may be a motivation, but their participation can be essential to the event's success. Celebrities not only promote catalytic philanthropy, they can produce an effect some call Geldofism: "The mobilization of pop stars and their fans behind a cause." Therefore, because of their visibility, celebrities are used by organizers as a mean to gain support to the cause in hand.

Furthermore, the success of benefit concerts is tightly related to the quality of entertainment offered by them. To gain space and legitimization in the media, benefit concerts must have a large audience, the kind of large crowd attracted by famous music stars. Bob Geldof himself responded to criticisms about the lack of African artists on the Live 8 by stating that, although those musicians produce great works, they do not sell many albums—and, for the sake of reaching as many people as possible, his concert had to include only popular artists.

Finally, the quality of entertainment is key to the creation of a public sphere where discussions about the concert's cause can occur. The better the entertainment, the more people watch the concert, and thus the more people become aware of the cause. Furthermore, the music played in the concerts can lead spectators to interconnect and become more likely to act towards the cause. According to a theory, by Jane Bennett, when people sing in the presence of other people, and that happens in benefit concerts, they become connected to each other and are more likely to work together towards a goal.

Critics also say that benefit concerts are just a way for the rich West to forgive itself by helping the poor and distressed. These critiques argue that concerts like the Live Aid "rob Africans of agency, reinforces Western ethnocentrism and racisms and see famine as a natural disaster rather than as a political issue".

== Effectiveness ==
Benefit concerts are an effective form of gaining support and raising funds for a cause because of the large media coverage that they usually receive. In addition to the results they generate themselves, benefit concerts also generate a kind of cascading effect. That is, larger benefit concert motivate smaller concerts and other kinds of charity initiatives.

== As media events ==
Large-scale benefit concerts attract millions of viewers and are usually broadcast internationally. As powerful means of mass communication, they can be highly effective at raising funds and awareness for humanitarian causes. Media scholars Dayan and Katz classify benefit concerts as "media events": shared experiences that unite viewers with one another and their societies. In fact, in their book Media Events: The Live Broadcasting of History, the authors suggest that the song synonymous with the Live Aid benefit concert, "We Are the World", might as well be the theme song for media events, as it nicely encompasses the tone of such occasions: "these ceremonies (media events) are so all-encompassing that there is nobody left to serve-as out-group".

Dayan and Katz define media events as shared experiences that unite viewers and call their attention to a particular cause or occasion. They argue that media events interrupt the flow people's daily lives, and that such events create a rise of interpersonal communication or "fellow feeling". Furthermore, they propose that media events transform the ordinary role of the viewer into something more interactive where they adhere to the script of the event. All these principles of media events are true of benefit concerts. Benefit concerts interrupt the routine of people's lives because they occur (in most cases) for only for one night or for one week-end. Furthermore, they are broadcast as television spectacles that interrupt the regular scheduled programming on a given television network. Often, this kind of announced interruption has television viewers discussing the event with others beforehand, generating excitement around the event. Moreover, benefit concerts encourage audiences to adhere to their script, such as by phoning in donations or signing an online pledge.

== Benefit concerts and para-social interaction ==
As media events, benefit concerts are widely broadcast and seen by millions of people. (The Live Aid charity concert in 1985, for example, was seen by an estimated 1.5 billion viewers worldwide.) However, this mass dissemination is only one of the factors that contribute to the success of benefit concerts. The people who send the message for collective action are essential to a benefit concert's effectiveness.

Dayan and Katz suggest that media events are an expression of a "neo-romantic desire for heroic action", meaning that media events produce leaders who inspire collective action with belief in the "power of the people" to change the world. Benefit concerts, therefore, have the potential to raise enormous sums of money for a cause because of the para-social interaction that occurs between the performing celebrities (the leaders) and the spectating fans (the people).

Dan Laughey describes para-social interaction as "the apparent familiarity between media personalities and audiences". Seeing a favourite celebrity support a cause can influence fans to support the same cause—not because the cause is significant to the fans, but because it seems significant to the artist. To feel connected to a celebrity, fans are likely to participate in activities the celebrity considers important. For example, if a benefit concert starred unknown musicians performing songs for unknown people in Africa, the incentive for viewers to donate would be minimal. Bob Geldof, the founder of Live Aid, is aware of the need of familiarity and para-social interaction on behalf of the viewer. When criticised for not inviting enough African performers to play at Live Aid (of which the main purpose was famine relief for Africa), Geldof commented that only popular musicians were invited to play at the show because unfamiliar artists would cause viewers to lose interest and "switch off". In seeing the familiar face of their beloved artist on stage endorsing a cause, fans feel more compelled to support the cause.

== Criticisms ==
Criticisms against benefit concerts go further than just criticizing the intentions of the celebrities involved. Some argue that benefit concerts are a wrong response for tragedies because the atmosphere involved on them is not one of mourning. Further criticism comes from those who argue that Geldofism turns celebrities into the only legitimate spokespeople for a cause, robbing the NGOs of the possibilities to speak up for a cause.

== See also ==
- List of highest-grossing benefit concerts
