= Julian Wolpert =

American geographer and urban planner (1932–2025

Julian Wolpert (December 26, 1932 – August 22, 2025) was an American geographer, urban planner and academic who was Bryant Professor Emeritus of Geography, Public Affairs, and Urban Planning at Princeton University's Woodrow Wilson School, where he taught from 1973 to 2005 and chaired the Program in Urban and Regional Planning. He was previously a member of the Regional Science Department at the University of Pennsylvania (1963–73).

== Life and career ==
Wolpert was a 1953 graduate of Columbia University (BA) and the University of Wisconsin-Madison, MS & PhD (geography). He served as a US Navy officer from 1956 to 1959. He was elected to the National Academy of Sciences and AAAS. He has been a fellow at the Russell Sage Foundation, the Center for Advanced Study in the Behavioral and Social Sciences, and the Woodrow Wilson Center and has been a Guggenheim fellow. Wolpert is a nationally cited scholar in the fields of location theory, urban development, migration, public and social services, and the analysis of charity, philanthropy, and the nonprofit sector, and has testified before Congress about the regulation of philanthropy. He has challenged conservatives who advocate for charitable rather than public service approaches to social policy. Wolpert served as vice president, then president of the Association of American Geographers and vice president of the Regional Science Association and the American Geographical Society and was elected to the American Institute of Certified Planners.

He was an early behaviorist (1960s) who demonstrated that producer and migrant decisions were affected differentially by imperfect information and environmental uncertainty. The analyses used operations research and multivariate statistical models of spatially sampled data. Later research focused on the migration decision, the relation between commuting and migration, siting and closing of amenity and "nimby" facilities, disaster evacuation, and the effects of sprawl on regional development. More recently, his studies concerned the nonprofit marketplace in cities, nonprofit service representation and saturation of neighborhoods, locational differences in generosity, distributional effects of foundations, the fiscal viability of nonprofits, and methods for planning and evaluating nonprofit organizations and foundations.

Wolpert died in Morristown, New Jersey, on August 22, 2025, at the age of 92.

== Selected publications ==
- The Decision Process in Spatial Context, Annals, Association of American Geographers, 54 (1964).(reprinted and translated in 13 edited books)
- Behavioral Aspects of the Decision to Migrate, Papers, Regional Science Association, 15 (1964). (widely reprinted)
- Notes on Social Science Principles for World Law, Papers, Peace Research Soc., 2 (1964) (with Walter Isard).
- A Regional Simulation Model of Information Diffusion, Public Opinion Quarterly, 30 (1966).
- Migration as an Adjustment to Urban Stress, Journal of Social Issues, 22 (1966).
- Distance and Directional Bias in Inter urban Migratory Streams, Annals, Association of American Geographers, 57 (1967).
- Learning to Cooperate, Papers, Peace Research Soc., 7 (1967). Coalition Structures in the Three people Non zero-sum Game, Papers, Peace Research Soc., 8 (1967).
- The Basis for Stability of Inter regional Transactions, Geographical Analysis, 1 (1969).
- Interdependence between Commuting and Migration, Proceedings, Association of American Geographers, 1 (1969).
- Departures from the Usual Environment in Locational Analysis, Annals, Association of American Geographers, 60 (1970).
- The Sequential Expansion of a Decision Model in Spatial Context, Environment and Planning, 1 (1969) (with Dolf Zillman).
- A Strategy of Ambiguity in Locational Decisions (with John Seley), in K.R. Cox, et al.(eds.), Locational Approaches to Power and Conflict, Sage, 1972.
- The Transition to Interdependence in Locational Decisions (with Ralph Ginsberg), in K.R. Cox and R.G. Golledge (eds.), Behavioral Problems in Geography, Northwestern University Press, 1971.
- Time Paths of Migration Flows (with Lakshman Yapa), Geographical Analysis, 3 (1971).
- The Implementation of Controversial Hazard Control and Facility Complex Programs (with C. Murray Austin and Tony Smith), Geographical Analysis, 2 (1970).
- Interdependencies of Commuting, Migration and Job Site Relocation (with Lakshman Yapa and Mario Polese), Economic Geography (January 1971).
- A Decision Model for Locating Controversial Facilities (with Anthony Mumphrey and John Seley), Journal of the American Institute of Planners (November, 1971).
- Metropolitan Neighborhoods: Participation and Conflict Over Change (with Anthony Mumphrey and John Seley). Commission on College Geography, Association of American Geographers, Washington, D.C. (1972).
- Community Discretion Over Neighborhood Change (with Anthony Mumphrey and John Seley), National Academy of Sciences, National Research Council. Symposium on Geographical Perspectives and Urban Problems (July, 1971).
- Equity Considerations and Concessions in the Siting of Public Facilities (with Anthony J. Mumphrey), Economic Geography 49 (1973).
- The Middle East: Some Basic Issues and Alternatives, Ed. (with Walter Isard), Cambridge: Schoenkman (1972).
- From Asylum to Ghetto (with Eileen Wolpert), Antipode 6, #3 (1974).
- Satellite Mental Health Facilities (with Michael Dear and Randi Crawford) Annals, Association of American Geographers, 65 (1975) 24 35.
- Deconcentration of Community Mental Health Programs (with Randi Crawford) Regional Science Research Institute (1974).
- The Relocation of Released Mental Hospital Patients into Residential Communities (with Eileen Wolpert), Policy Sciences, Vol. 7 (1976) 31 51.
- The Siting of Mental Health Satellite Facilities: Demonstration of a Comparative Case Study Instrument (with Randi Crawford). Regional Science Research Institute (1975).
- Regressive Siting of Public Facilities, Natural Resources Journal, Vol. 16 (1976) 103 115.
- Opening Closed Spaces, Annals, Association of American Geographers 66 (1976) 1 13.
- Service Facility Representation in Urban Communities, Proceedings of the Joint U.S. Soviet Seminar on Urban Quality of Life, Moscow, 1975.
- Community Support Systems for Blind Deaf Adults, Proceedings of Southwestern Region Deaf-Blind Center, Sacramento, California 1976.
- Geography and the Scientific Technological Revolution, Proceedings of the International Geographic Union, Congress, Moscow, 1976.
- Community Support Systems for the Mentally Disabled, Horizon House Inst., Philadelphia, 1976.
- Accessibility of Human Services, Urban Resources Center Proceedings, Texas Southern University, 1976.
- Social Planning and the Mentally and Physically Handicapped. The Growing "Special Service" Populations, Center for Urban Policy Research Proceedings, Rutgers University, 1976.
- Social and Capital Infrastructure as Renewable and Non-Renewable Resources, National Research Council, Washington, D.C. 1976.
- Social Income and the Voluntary Sector, Papers, Regional Science Association, Vol. 39 (1977), pp. 217 229.
- Small Scale Residential Facilities for De hospitalized Mental Patients. Report to N.J. Dept. of Human Services, 1976.
- Community Based Residential and Human Service Facilities in N.J. Report to N.J. Dept. of Human Services (5 vols.), 1978.
- A System's Analysis and Evaluation of the Deinstitutionalization of N.J.'s Developmentally Disabled Population. Report to the Dept. of H.E.W., Office of Human Development (5 vols.), 1978.
- The Impact of Group Homes upon Residential Neighborhoods. Published by N.Y. State Office of MR and DD, Albany, 1978.
- Neighborhood Strategies in Federal, State and Local Housing Policies. Report prepared for the Conference on Residential Mobility and Public Policy, UCLA, Nov 1979.
- Community Response to Deinstitutionalized Patients, Journal of the National Association of Private Psychiatric Hospitals (1980).
- Equity and Location, in Equity Issues in Radioactive Waste Management, edited by Roger Kasperson and Robert Kates, OG & H Publ., Cambridge, Mass. 1980 (with John Seley.
- The Dignity of Risk, Transactions, Institute of British Geographers, 1980.
- The Non Profit Sector in the Metropolitan Economy, Economic Geography 57, No. 1, 1980, pp. 23 34. (with Thomas Reiner).
- Philanthropy in the Metropolitan Philadelphia Area, University of Pennsylvania, 1980, 130 pps. (with Thomas Reiner).
- The Neighborhood Strategy in the Community Development Block Grant Program, Community Development Strategies Evaluation, HUD, 1980, 80 pps.
- Baseline Report on Twenty Study Areas, Community Development Strategies Evaluation, HUD, 1980, 120 pps.
- Neighborhood Development. Report prepared for the Presidential Commission on Agendas for the 80's. Washington, D.C., 1980, 40 pps.
- The Not for Profit Sector in Stable and Growing Metropolitan Regions, Papers, Regional Science Association, 1981.
- Programs and Impacts, Community Development Strategies Evaluation, HUD, 1981.
- Comfort and Solace to Cities in Distress. Published as Atwood Lecture, Clark University, 1982.
- The Nonprofit Sector of the Region's Economy, Regional Plan News, September 1982, No. 111, New York, N.Y.
- Long Term Neighborhood Property Impacts of Group Homes for Mentally Retarded People. Published by N.Y. State Office of MR and DD, Albany, 1982 (with Lawrence Dolan).
- Social Cohesion and Community Development, Community Development Strategies Evaluation, HUD, 1982.
- Behavioral and Social Science Research: A National Resource. Contributed sections of the report. National Academy of Sciences National Research Council, Washington, D.C. 1982.
- Can Philanthropy Replace Government Programs? Metropolitan Philanthropy Discussion Paper Series, University of Pennsylvania, 1982.
- New Jersey Group Homes for Mentally Retarded People: An Investigation of Neighborhood Property Impacts. Report for New Jersey Division of MR and DD, Trenton, March 1983.
- Neighborhood Preservation Companies: Self Sufficiency and Capping Issues. New York Division of Housing and Community Renewal, 1983 (with Thomas Reiner).
- The Philanthropy Marketplace, Economic Geography, Vol. 60, No. 3, July 1984 (with Thomas Reiner).
- Service Provision by the Not for Profit Sector: A Comparative Study, Economic Geography, 60, No. 1, 1984, pp. 28 37 (with Thomas Reiner).
- The Not for Profit Sector in Stable and Growing Metropolitan Regions, Urban Affairs Quarterly, Vol. 20, No. 4, June 1985 pp. 487 510 (with Thomas Reiner).
- The Gulf of Maine Boundary Dispute. Contributions to Socio-Economic Annex, U.S. State Department, 1985.
- The Savings/Harm Tableau for Social Impact Assessment of Retrenchment Policies (with John Seley), Economic Geography, 60, 2 (1985).
- Place Rights and Neighborhood Bailout (with John Seley) 1984 Woodrow Wilson School Working Paper.
- Funding Caps (with Thomas Reiner). Public Administration Review. 45,3 (1985), 391 98.
- Social Characteristics as Contributors to Neighborhood Development, U.S. Dept. of Housing & Community Development, 1985.
- Why Urban Triage Cannot Work (with John Seley) 1986 Working Paper
- Urban Neighborhoods as a National Resource: Irreversible Decisions and their Equity Spillovers (with John Seley), Geographical Analysis, 18, 1 (1986) 81 93.
- Dynamic Municipal Allocation Analysis (with L.W. Dolan and John Seley), Environment and Planning, 1986.
- The Not for Profit Sector in Stable and Growing Metropolitan Regions, Urban Affairs Quarterly, Vol. 20, No. 4, June 1985 pp. 487 510 (with Thomas Reiner).
- Philanthropy Rights and Entitlements (with Thomas A. Reiner), in Philanthropy, Voluntary Action and the Public Good, Independent Sector: Washington, D.C., 1986.
- Philanthropy: A Research Agenda, in Charles Clotfelter (ed.) Setting the Research Agenda in Philanthropy and Volunteerism. Center for the Study of Philanthropy and Voluntarism, Institute of Policy Sciences and Public Affairs, Duke University, 1987, pp. 6 14.
- Austerity Impacts on Neighborhood Development Organizations (with Thomas Reiner), Policy Studies Journal, 16, No.2, Winter, 1987, pp. 307 23.
- The Nuclear Iceberg: Hazards to the Siting of Hazardous Waste, published as Ida Beam Lecture, University of Iowa, 1986.
- The Asymmetry between Growth and Decline, published as Ida Beam Lecture, University of Iowa, 1986.
- The Social Benefits of Regional Economic Growth, Report to the National Science Foundation, Princeton: Princeton University, Woodrow Wilson School, 32 pp., 1987.
- Local Competition for Economic Development (with Michael Danielson), in New Jersey Issues: Papers from the Council on New Jersey Affairs. Princeton, N.J.: Princeton Urban and Regional Research Center, March 1988.
- Issues in Emergency Planning for Nuclear Accidents: The Three Mile Island Context (with John Seley), Industrial Crisis Quarterly, 2 (1), 1988, pp. 1 14.
- A Stochastic Planning System for Siting and Closing Public Service Facilities (with S.R. Gregg and J.M. Mulvey), Environment and Planning, A, 20, 83 98, 1988.
- Dedicated versus Mainstreaming Approaches to Emergency Planning: A Risk/Benefit Analysis for Three Mile Island (with John Seley), Proceedings, Annual Meetings, American Collegiate Schools of Planning, 1988.
- Suburban Highway Congestion in the New York Metropolitan Area, Proceedings, Regional Transportation Mobility Conference, New York Port Authority, December 1988.
- Policy Responses to the Costs of Regional Growth (with Michael N. Danielson), Report to the National Science Foundation, 3, Princeton: Princeton University, Woodrow Wilson School, 28 pp., 1988.
- Decentralization as a Locational Asset (with Michael N.Danielson), Proceedings, Conference on Geography and Public Administration, Baltimore, 1989.
- The Costs of Regional Growth, in J. Fraser Hart (ed.) Our Changing Cities, Johns Hopkins University Press, 1990, pp. 170 88.
- Self Sufficiency of Neighborhood Development Organizations in a Time of Austerity (with Thomas A. Reiner), in N. Carmon (ed.) Neighborhood Policy and Programmes, Macmillan, 1990.
- Distributing the Benefits of Economic Growth (with Michael N. Danielson), Urban Studies, 28:3 (1991), pp. 391 412.
- The Community Impact of the Pollution Insurance Crisis (with John E. Seley), Working Paper, 1991.
- Winners and Losers in the 1980s, Proceedings of the Eleventh Annual NJ State Data Center Conference, NJ Communities & the Census, New Brunswick, NJ, 1990.
- Growth Effects on Metropolitan Disparities, Proceedings, 32nd Annual Conference of the Assoc of Collegiate Schools of Planning, Austin, Texas, November 2, 1990.
- Transportation and Economic Development, Proceedings of the Transportation Research Board, Wilmington, DE, 1990.
- Winners and Losers in the Competition for Growth (with M. N. Danielson), Council of New Jersey Affairs, Princeton, NJ, August 7, 1990.
- A Dynamic Land Use and Transportation Model for Growth Management and Job Access, University Transportation Research Center, City University of New York, 1990.
- The Rural Fringe in the New Metropolis (with M. N. Danielson), Proceedings, National Rural Studies Committee, 1991 pp. 33 46.
- Overcoming Hurdles to Communities' Right to Know (with J. Seley), Proceedings, Scientific Symposium, Environmental and Occupational Health Sciences Institute, Rutgers University New Brunswick, NJ, 1991.
- Rapid Metropolitan Growth and Community Disparities (with M.N. Danielson), Growth and Change, 23:4 (1992), pp. 494 515.
- Quality of Life Evaluation (with Michael N. Danielson), in Impact Assessment of the New Jersey State Development and Redevelopment Plan, Center for Urban Policy Research at Rutgers University, 1991.
- Case Study, The Effects of Growth on Quality of Life (with Michael N. Danielson), in Impact Assessment of the New Jersey State Development and Redevelopment Plan, Center for Urban Policy Research, Rutgers University, 1991.
- Transportation and the Distribution of Metropolitan Economic Growth (with M.N. Danielson), Working Paper, 1994.
- Regional Economic Growth and Highway Congestion, Working Paper, 1994.
- From Old to New Metropolis (with Michael N. Danielson) in M. Baldasarre (ed.) Suburban Communities: Change and Policy Responses (JAI Press: Greenwich, CN, 1994.
- Social and Economic Effects of Hazard Waste Sites, in The Department of Defense Priority Model for Hazardous Waste Site Restoration, National Research Council, Washington, DC, 1992.
- Classification of Priority Setting Approaches, in Remedial Action Priorities for Hazardous Waste Sites, National Research Council, Washington, DC, 1992.
- Interdependent Development of Rural and Urban Places: Evidence and Policy (with Edward Bergman). Working Paper, 1994.
- Improving the Right to Know Fact Sheet Process: A Survey of Industry and LEPCs (with John Seley and Ted Morrow Spitzer), Final Report, Hazardous Substance Management Research Center, 1994.
- Evolving Issues in Transportation Planning Research in New Jersey (with Robert Paaswell and Richard Brail), a research report for the NJ Department of Transportation, 1994.
- Putting People First in Transportation, Region II Transportation News, Fall 1994.
- The Yucca Mountain Nuclear Repository: The Mother of All NIMBYs, presented as University Lecture, University of Wisconsin, Madison, November, 1994.
- Classification of Priority Setting Approaches, Chapter 3 in Ranking Hazardous Waste Sites for Remedial Action, National Academy of Sciences National Research Council, Washington, DC 1994.
- Key Indicators of Generosity in Communities, in Virginia Hodgkinson and Richard Lyman, (Eds.). The Future of the Nonprofit Sector. San Francisco: Jossey Bass, 1989.
- The Geography of Generosity: Metropolitan Disparities in Donations and Support for Amenities, Annals, Association of American Geographers, 78:4, pp. 665 79, December 1988.
- Prudence and Parsimony, Symposium, "Philanthropy in the Reagan Years," Nonprofit and Voluntary Sector Quarterly, 18(3), Summer 1989.
- Pride in Place, Proceedings, Annual Meetings, Northeast Division, Assn. of American Geographers, Dartmouth College, 1988.
- Regional Generosity and Civic Commitment, in Looking Forward to the Year 2000: Public Policy and Philanthropy, 1988 Spring Research Forum, Independent Sector, Washington, D.C., 1988.
- Foundation Support for New Jersey's Nonprofits, Proceedings, Annual Meetings of the NJ Assn. of Grantmakers, 1989.
- Philanthropy in the New York Region: Its Challenges, Accomplishments, and Shortcomings, 1979 89, Proceedings, Tenth Anniversary Meeting of the New York Regional Assn. of Grantmakers, 1989.
- Self Sufficiency of Neighborhood Development Organizations in a Time of Austerity (with Thomas A. Reiner), in N. Carmon (ed.) Neighborhood Policy and Programmes, Macmillan, 1990.
- Generosity and Civic Commitment: The Local Public and Voluntary Sector in Robert J. Bennett ed. Decentralisation, Local Governments and Markets: Toward a Post Welfare Agenda Oxford Univ. Press, 1990.
- The Not for Profit Domain: Toward a Regional and Location Theory (with Thomas A. Reiner), in M. Chatterji and R. Kuenne (eds.) Dynamics and Conflict in Regional Structural Change, 1990, pp. 157 70.
- Applying the National Taxonomy of Exempt Entities: Geographical Profiles, Voluntas 4 (2), 1993.
- Decentralization and Equity in Public and Nonprofit Sectors, Nonprofit and Voluntary Sector Quarterly, 22:4, 1993.
- Incentives for Selective Re centralization: The Issue of Welfare Disparities between States and Localities. Annual Meetings of Assoc. of Coll. Schools of Planning. Philadelphia, Pa., 1993
- The Location of Generosity: Policy Analysis and Remedies for Stingy Places, PONPO Meetings, Yale University, New Haven, 1993.
- Patterns of Generosity in America: Who's Holding the Safety Net?, Twentieth Century Fund, New York, NY, 1994.
- Fragmentation in America's Nonprofit Sector in Virginia Hodgkinson and Paul Schervish, eds. Passing on the Tradition of Caring and Service to the Next Generation, San Francisco: Jossey Bass, 1994
- Equity Implications of Federalism: Generosity Differences between States and Localities, presented at the American Collegiate Schools of Planning Annual Meetings, Phoenix, AZ, Nov. 1994.
- Protecting the Safety Net, Distinguished University Lecture, University of Wisconsin, Madison, November, 1994.
- How Federal Cutbacks Affect the Charitable Sector, Proceedings, 1996 Meetings of the Association of American Geographers, Charlotte, NC, March 17, 1996.
- What Charity Can and Cannot Do, New York: Twentieth Century Fund Press, 1995
- Fragmentation in America's Nonprofit Sector in Paul Schervish and Virginia Hodgkinson, eds. Care and Community in Modern Society. San Francisco: Jossey Bass, 1995.
- We Can Take Care of Our Own .. Or Can We, OP ED (in twenty newspapers, Summer, 1995.
- Rationalizing Selfishness, The American Prospect, Fall, 1995.
- Nonprofit Adjustments to Demographic Impacts, Proceedings, Research Forum, Independent Sector, Alexandria, VA, March 1995.
- Spatial Theory in Policy Analysis: The Devolution Issue. Proceedings, 1995 Meetings of the Association of American Geographers, Chicago, IL, 1995.
- Giving and Region: Generous and Stingy Communities, in Charles H. Hamilton and Warren F. Ilchman, eds. Cultures of Giving: How Region and Religion Influence Philanthropy. San isco: Jossey Bass, 1996.
- The Demographics of Giving Patterns in Dwight Burlingame, ed. Critical Issues in Fundraising. San Francisco: Jossey Bass, 1996.
- Commercial Corridor Project in University Transportation Research Center, Region 2 News, Spring, 1996.
- Nonprofit Adjustment to Neighborhood Change, Proceedings, 25th Anniversary Conference, Association for Research on Nonprofit Organizations and Voluntary Action, New York, 1996
- The Locational Behavior of Nonprofits: Accommodating Urban and Regional Change. A final research report submitted to the Nonprofit Sector Research Fund at the Aspen Institute, 1996.
- The Role of Small Religious Nonprofits in Changing Urban Neighborhoods, Nonprofit and Voluntary Sector Quarterly, 1999
- Center Cities as Havens and Traps for Low-Income Communities: The Potential Impact of Advanced Information Technology, in Donald Schon and Martin Rein, eds. Colloquium on Impacts of Advanced Information Technology on Low-Income Communities and the city. Cambridge: MIT Press, 1999.
- How Federal Cutbacks Affect the Charitable Sector, in Lynn Staeheli, et al. eds. Transforming American Government: Implications for a Diverse Society. Thousand Oaks, CA: Sage, 1999.
- The Role of Philanthropic Foundations: Lessons from America's Experience with Private Foundations. Chapter 6 in Helmut Anheier and Jeremy Kendall (Eds.) Third Sector Policy at the Crossroads: An International Nonprofit Analysis. London: Routledge 2001
- Communities, Networks and the Future of Philanthropy. Chapter in C.T. Clotfelter and T. Ehrlich (Eds.) Philanthropy and the Nonprofit Sector. Bloomington: Indiana University Press and American Assembly, 1999.
- Civil Society and Governance in a Regional and Community Context, chapter in V. Hodgkinson (Ed). Civil Society and Governance in the United States
- Governance and Opportunity in Metropolitan American. Contributions to NAS-NRC Report, Washington, DC: National Academy Press, 1999.
- Lessons from European Experience with Mass Transit. Contributions to NAS-NRC Report, Washington, DC: National Academy Press, 2001.
- Nonprofit Property Tax Exemption: Background, Challenges, and Implications, 2000 Lincoln Institute of Land Policy
- The Location of Nonprofit Facilities in Urban Areas. 2001. Lincoln Institute of Land Policy Working Paper WP01JW1
- Taking Care of Our Own (working paper)
- New York City's Nonprofit Sector, Toronto: Univ. of Toronto Press. 2003 (and supplementary Technical Manual on methodology. (with John E. Seley)
- Nonprofit Services in New York City's Neighborhoods. Univ. of Toronto Press. 2003 (with John E. Seley)
- Voluntary Failure Theory and Nonprofit-Government Partnership, in Helmut Anheier and Avner Ben-Ner, Eds., The Study of the Nonprofit Enterprise: Theories and Approaches. New York: Kluwer Academic, 2003
- Civil Society and Governance in a Regional and Community Context, in V. Hodgkinson (Ed). Civil Society and Governance in the United States. New York: Kluwer Academic, 2002
- The Distributional Impacts of Nonprofits and Philanthropy. in Patrice Flynn and Virginia Hodgkinson (Eds.). Measuring the Impact of the Private Nonprofit Sector on Society. Plenum Publ. 2002.
- The Role of Philanthropic Foundations: Lessons from America's Experience with Private Foundations. Chapter in Helmut Anheier and Jeremy Kendall, Eds.) Third Sector Policy at the Crossroads: An International Nonprofit Analysis. London: Routledge 2003
- The Impact of 9/11 on New York City's Nonprofits: Temporary Setback or NewTrajectory?” Community Studies Society Discussion Paper, 2002;
- Employment Growth in the Nonprofit Sector: Good or Bad News? Community Studies Society Discussion Paper, 2003;
- Nonprofit Response to Demographic Change: The Role of Government Support. Community Studies Society Discussion Paper, 2002;
- The Financial Squeeze for New York City's Nonprofit Human Service Providers. Univ. of Toronto Press. 2004 (with John E. Seley)
- Redistributional Effects of America's Private Foundations Chapter 8 in: Prewitt, Kenneth; Toepler, Stefan; and Heydemann, Steven (Eds.) Philanthropic Foundations and Legitimacy: US and European Perspectives. SSRC and Russell Sage. 2004.
- The Use of Computer and Office Technology among New York City's Nonprofit Organizations. Chapter in Information Technology Adoption in the Nonprofit Sector
- Secular and Faith-Based Human Services: Complementarities or Competition? Community Studies Society Discussion Paper, 2004
