= Behnegar =

Behnegar (Persian: بهنگار and یه‌نگار) is an Iranian surname. Notable people with the surname include:

- Atoosa Rubenstein (born Atoosa Behnegar, 1972), Iranian-American former magazine editor
- Nasser Behnegar, American political scientist
