= Bartunek =

Bartunek or Bartůněk (feminine: Bartůňková) is a surname of Czech origin. Notable people with the surname include:

- Allen J. Bartunek (1928–1997), American politician
- Jan Bartůněk (born 1965), Czechoslovak sprint canoer
- Jean M. Bartunek (born 1944), American management scientist
- Nikola Bartůňková (born 2006), Czech tennis player
