= TransCultural Exchange =

American non-profit organization

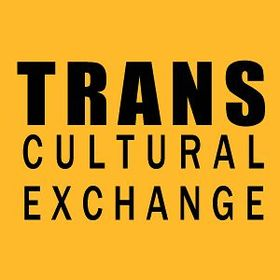
- Founded: 1989
- Founder: Mary Sherman
- Type: 501 (c)
- Region served: Worldwide

TransCultural Exchange (TCE) is a non-profit organization whose stated mission is "to foster a greater understanding of world cultures through large-scale global projects, artist exchanges and, most notably, a biennale International Conference on Opportunities in the Arts." TransCultural Exchange was founded by Mary Sherman in 1989.

== Work ==
TransCultural Exchange has worked in more than sixty countries to produce cultural exchanges, exhibitions, and public art works. All of these have involved artists from different cultures, working across disciplines and, typically, include artist exchanges and collaborations as key components. In 2002, UNESCO awarded TCE sponsorship and it became the first US project to receive it since the US mission rejoined UNESCO. The organization also sponsors artists for residency and exchange programs.

In 2013, Boston University announced that it will be collaborating with TransCultural Exchange on multiple projects through 2016.

== Projects ==
=== The Coaster Project and The Coaster Project, Destination: The World ===
In the year 2000, TransCultural Exchange launched its first Coaster Project at the 2000 London Biennale, followed by a second, international version in conjunction with their show in 2002 at New York City's Trans Hudson Gallery and a 10th anniversary of the project at Toronto's 2012 BIG on Bloor Festival. For the first version, the members of TransCultural Exchange made artworks in the form of coasters that were exhibited and then distributed, free of charge, under drinks at London's Cynthia's Cyberbar and New York's Telephone Bar. Subsequently, the organization used the Internet and collected 10,000 coasters from various artists from different countries. These coasters were given away around the world at bars, restaurants, museums and cafes, including the Museum of Fine Arts Boston, Palais de Tokyo in Paris, Chicago Cultural Center and National Institute of Design in Ahmedabad.

=== The Tile Project, Destination: The World ===
The Tile Project, Destination: The World was a project organized by TCE in 2004. The project resulted in 22 new public artworks. For these public art works, artists, students and teachers from over 40 countries, donated more than 2000 tiles to the 22 world sites to create 22 site-specific works. It is currently in the permanent collections of 22 sites including Western Institute of Technology and Higher Education and Cultural Center of the Philippines.

The Tile Project, Destination: The World was the first U.S. project sponsored by United Nations Educational, Scientific and Cultural Organization (UNESCO) since the U.S. mission rejoined UNESCO. UNESCO's Director-General Koichiro Matsurra, noted of the project, "This original project linking together artists all over the world in a spirit of international harmony and exchange, ties in directly with the main objectives of UNESCO's programme in the field of art and creativity and the promotion of cultural diversity and intercultural dialogue."

== The International Conference on Opportunities in Arts ==
The organization holds its Conference on International Opportunities in the Arts every other year. The first conference was held in 2007. The aim of the conference is to let artists know about the opportunities for them to participate, interact and work with international peers. The conference lasts three days and features multiple seminars, workshops and exhibitions. The conference is known for multiple renowned speakers. Past speakers have included Ute Meta Bauer, Octavio Zaya, Sarat Maharaj, David Medalla and John Tirman.

In 2013, the organization held its fourth conference at Boston University. The keynote speaker at the conference was Laurie Anderson with welcoming comments by Michael Dukakis. The centerpiece of the conference was an art installation by Florian Dombois, a laser that was projected from the roof tops of two tall buildings more than half a mile apart at Boston University. Dombois's art installation also included a "real-time" conversation (the actual movement between the buildings), which was broadcast via the Internet.

== Funding ==
TransCultural Exchange is funded through individual and corporate donations as well as organizational grants. The organization received a $25,000 grant from the National Endowment of Arts in 2013.
