= Jeffry Korgen =

American writer and comic creator

Jeffry Korgen is an American writer and comic creator.

== Early life and education ==
Korgen was raised in Slidell, Louisiana, and holds degrees in philosophy, pastoral ministry, and social work from Boston College.

== Career ==
From 1998 to 2008 Korgen served The National Pastoral Life Center as Director of Social Ministries. In 2006 Paulist Press published his book My Lord & My God: Engaging Catholics in Social Ministry. In 2007, Orbis Books published his book Solidarity Will Transform the World: Stories of Hope from Catholic Relief Services.

While researching this book in 2006, Korgen interviewed Rwandans engaged in reconciliation efforts following the Rwandan Genocide. His results were published in America Magazine and showed evidence that peacebuilding projects by the Catholic Relief Services influenced several hundred Rwandan judges who tried cases against the perpetrators of the violence. He further asserts that the involvement of the church intended to improve the care of Rwandans against epidemics such as HIV.

In 2013, Interfaith Worker Justice published his graphic novel Wage Theft, which was sponsored by the US Conference of Catholic Bishops and the Archdiocese of Galveston-Houston and set in Houston. Paul Buhle wrote of the book that “Throughout the novella, workers of varying demographics face wage theft’s presence in a number of occupations: restaurants, construction, dry cleaning and meatpacking, to name just a few. The comic concludes with reminders that demonstrations, legal aid and faith can renew a sense of dignity for workers who feel dehumanized by their employer’s abuse.” Korgen published the non-fiction book Beyond Empowerment: A Pilgrimage with the Catholic Campaign for Human Development in 2015. Orbis also published his book The True Cost of Low Prices: The Violence of Globalization.

In 2024 Paulist Press published the graphic novel Dorothy Day: Radical Devotion, based upon the life of the eponymous protagonist. A review in the National Catholic Reporter stated that the book’s, “integrated seriousness and humor seems a fitting tribute for Day, who in her wisdom always took the world much more seriously than she took herself. Most essentially, Radical Devotion offers an invaluable compendium for those who want to learn about Dorothy, warts and all.” From 2014 to 2022 Korgen also coordinated the effort of the Archdiocese of New York’s towards the canonization of Dorothy Day.

Korgen has presented at Cambridge University’s Von Hügel Institute for Critical Catholic Inquiry and served as Executive Director of the Department of Diocesan Planning for the Diocese of Metuchen from 2008 to 2014, where he participated as a Greenfaith Fellow.
