= Katherine McAuliffe =

Canadian psychologist

Katherine Jane McAuliffe
- Education: University of King's College; University of Cambridge; Harvard University
- Scientific career
- Workplaces: Yale University; Boston College
- Thesis: The Evolution and Development of Inequity Aversion. (2013)

Katherine Jane McAuliffe is a Canadian psychologist who is a professor of psychology at Boston College, studying evolutionary anthropology and how children develop a sense of fairness. McAuliffe has conducted studies with children at a range of international sites in an effort to characterize cross-cultural similarities and variations.

== Early life and education ==
McAuliffe was born in Italy and grew up in Toronto. She earned her undergraduate degree at Dalhousie University and the University of King's College in Halifax, Nova Scotia where she studied marine biology, working with Hal Whitehead and Janet Mann on cetacean research. She was awarded the David Durward Memorial Prize. She then moved to the University of Cambridge, where she earned a Master of Philosophy (MPhil) in Biological Anthropology. Her Master's research looked at cooperation amongst primates and the evolution of babysitting. She found that humans were considerably more likely than primates to leave their children in the care of a non-family member. Following completion of her M.Phil. at Cambridge she worked with Alex Thornton (now at the University of Exeter - Falmouth Campus) at the Kalahari Meerkat Project in the Kalahari Desert studying teaching in meerkats. After completing her MPhil, McAuliffe moved to Harvard University for her doctoral research in what is now the Department of Human Evolutionary Biology. Her doctorate was supervised by Richard Wrangham. She studied the evolution and development of inequity aversion, and how children become sensitive to the fair distribution of resources.

== Research and career ==
McAuliffe moved to Yale University where she worked as a post-doc with Laurie R. Santos and Yarrow Dunham. After two years at Yale, McAuliffe was hired as an assistant professor at Boston College in the Department of Psychology and became a tenured Associate Professor in 2021. Her research considers cooperation in humans and how the ability to cooperate develops in children. Unlike typical psychologists, McAuliffe investigates global communities, not just the western, educated, industrialized, rich, democratic (WEIRD) population.

At Boston College, McAuliffe is director of the Cooperation Lab and co-directs the Virtue Project with Liane Young, where an "interdisciplinary team applies rigorous scientific methods to the question of how virtue is gradually constructed in the developing mind, how it is sustained in adulthood, and how it can be promoted." Her work has studied how fairness develops in children around the world, with study sites in Canada, India, Peru, Senegal, Uganda, the United States and Mexico. Her work has explored how children react to both advantageous and disadvantageous inequity, largely through economic game experiments. She found that an aversion to disadvantageous inequity was common amongst all societies, but of the eight study sites only children in Canada, Uganda and the USA rejected advantageous inequity.

== Awards and honors ==
- 2016 Association for Psychological Science Rising Star
- 2017 Canadian Institute for Advanced Research Azrieli Global Scholar
- 2017 Society for Research in Child Development Early Career Research Contributions Award
- 2020 Human Behavior and Evolution Society Early Career Award

== Selected publications ==
- Alex Thornton; Katherine McAuliffe (1 July 2006). "Teaching in wild meerkats". Science. 313 (5784): 227–229. Bibcode:2006Sci...313..227T. doi:10.1126/science.1128727. ISSN 0036-8075. PMID 16840701. Wikidata Q33997619.
- Peter R. Blake; Katherine McAuliffe (26 May 2011). ""I had so much it didn't seem fair": Eight-year-olds reject two forms of inequity". Cognition. 120 (2): 215–224. doi:10.1016/j.cognition.2011.04.006. ISSN 0010-0277. PMID 21616483. Wikidata Q48662378.
- P R Blake; K McAuliffe; J Corbit; et al. (18 November 2015). "The ontogeny of fairness in seven societies". Nature. 528 (7581): 258–261. doi:10.1038/nature15703. ISSN 1476-4687. PMID 26580018. Wikidata Q46686790.
