= Suzanne Matson =

American professor and writer (born 1959)

- Born: 1959 (age 65–66); Portland, Oregon, U.S.

Academic background
- Education: University of Washington (MA, Ph.D); Portland State University (BA)
- Thesis: Present tenses in American poetry (1987)
- Website: suzannematson.com

Suzanne Marie Matson (born 1959) is an American fiction writer, poet and professor at Boston College.

== Education and career ==
Matson has a B.A. from Portland State University, and an M.A. (1983) and Ph.D. (1987) from the University of Washington. As of 2022, she is a professor at Boston College.

== Work ==
Matson is known for writing short fiction, novels and poetry. Her novels include The Hunger Moon, A Trick of Nature, The Tree-Sitter, and Ultraviolet. Her books of poetry have been reviewed by the Harvard Book Review.

== Selected publications ==
- Matson, Suzanne (1990). Sea level : poems. Cambridge, Mass.: A. James Books. ISBN 0-914086-84-7. OCLC 21973571.
- Matson, Suzanne (1993). Durable goods : poems. Cambridge, Mass.: Alice James Books. ISBN 1-882295-00-5. OCLC 27811654.
- Matson, Suzanne (1997). The Hunger Moon. W. W. Norton & Company.
- Matson, Suzanne (2018). Ultraviolet. New York. ISBN 978-1-936787-95-1. OCLC 1049803120.

== Honors and awards ==
In 2012 Matson received a National Endowment for the Arts Creative Writing Fellowship.
