= Michael Resler =

German philologist, academic and author (born 1948)

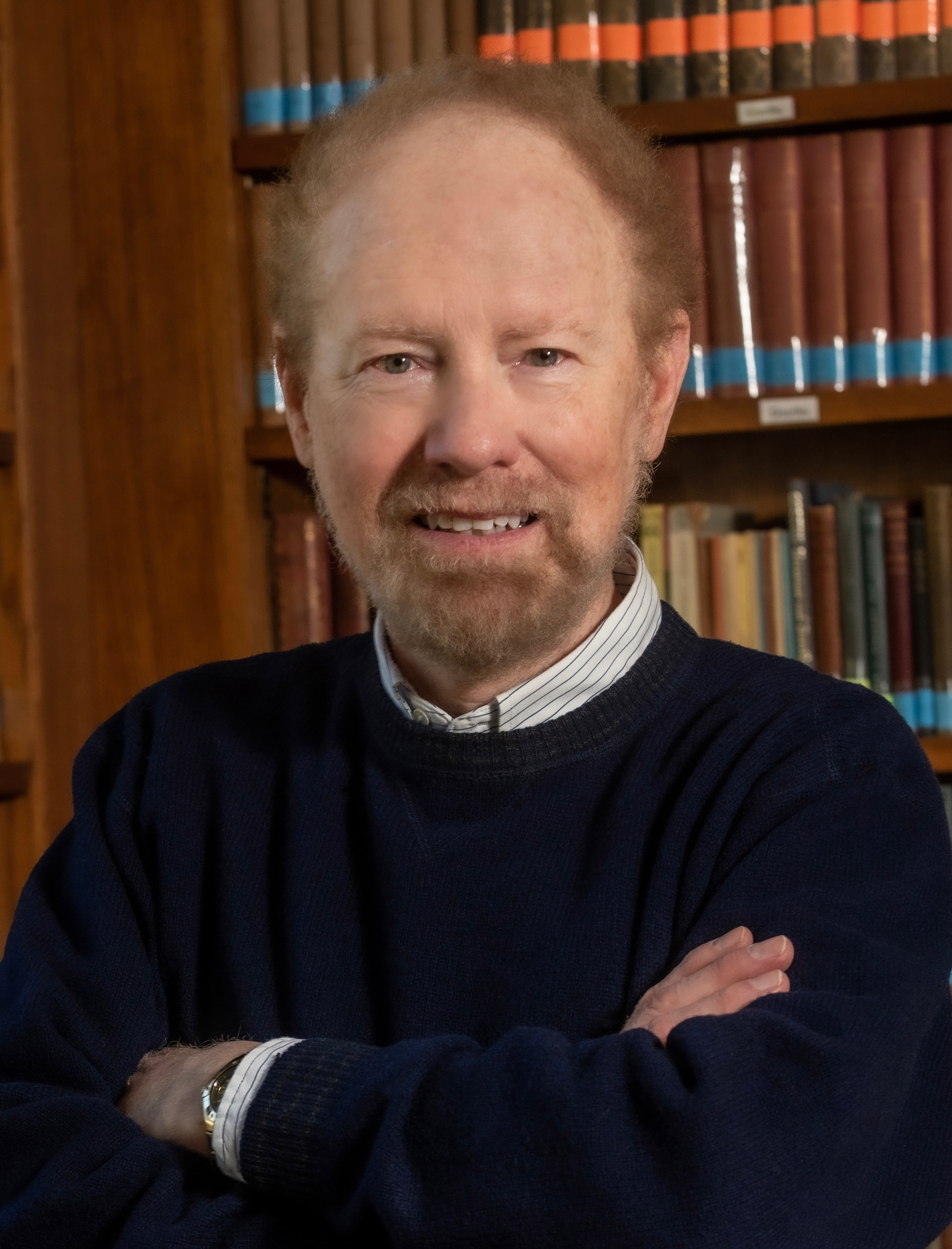
- Resler in 2024
- Born: July 7, 1948 (age 78)
- Occupations: Philologist, university professor, and author
- Awards: Bundesverdienstkreuz, Federal Republic of Germany (2014)

Academic background
- Education: A.B., College of William and Mary; A.M., Harvard University; PhD, Harvard University

Academic work
- Institutions: Boston College

Michael Resler (born July 7, 1948) is a philologist, academic, and author, specializing in the late-12th- and early-13th-century German Arthurian romance. He is a research professor of German Studies at Boston College.

Most known for his work on medieval Germanic philology, Resler has authored six books, including works on Daniel von dem Blühenden Tal by der Stricker and Hartmann von Aue's Erec. Additionally, he was awarded a National Endowment for the Humanities Fellowship for the academic year 1980–81. In 2014, he was honored with the Bundesverdienstkreuz (Order of Merit of the Federal Republic of Germany), the highest award accorded to civilians by the German government, in recognition of his successful mentorship of (at the time) 100 Fulbright applicants to Germany and Austria; in the meantime the number of Fulbright scholars successfully mentored by Resler has topped 150.

== Education ==
Resler earned his A.B. degree magna cum laude in 1970 in German from the College of William & Mary, where he was elected to Phi Beta Kappa. Subsequently, he completed an A.M. at Harvard University in 1974, and a PhD from Harvard in 1976. In addition, he has studied at the Universität Salzburg, Austria, and in Germany at the Ruhr-Universität Bochum and the Johannes-Gutenberg-Universität in Mainz.

== Career ==
Resler began his academic career in 1972 as a teaching fellow in Germanic languages and Literatures at Harvard University, where he served until 1976. After completing his doctorate at Harvard in 1976, he obtained a position in the German Studies Department at Boston College, where he continued to teach, since 1991 at the rank of professor of German Studies, until his retirement in 2024. Resler chaired the Department of German Studies at Boston College for 27 years (1992–2020). During the winter semester 2018/2019, he was a visiting professor at the Katholische Universität Eichstätt-Ingolstadt. Additionally, he held a position as a lecturer in German at Harvard University Extension from 1978 to 1994.

== Works ==
Resler has published six books on medieval Germanic philology, including both critical editions and translations from Middle High German into English. His first book, a critical edition of Daniel von dem Blühenden Tal (Daniel of the Blossoming Valley), appeared in 1983 in the Altdeutsche Textbibliothek series. His 1987 work is an English-language translation of Erec by Hartmann von Aue, presenting the earliest German Arthurian romance (ca. 1185) within its historical and cultural context, accompanied by detailed notes referencing scholarly research from over a century.

Resler has made contributions to the Daniel text, the earliest (c. 1210 – 1225) freely invented German-language (composed in Middle High German) Arthurian romance, as he has published both a critical edition of that text and the sole English-language translation. That translation (1990), accompanied by an introduction and extensive annotation, made the Daniel tale available to English-speaking readers for the first time in its 800-year history; the introduction offered insights into the textual history, language, and cultural significance of Daniel within the context of the German Arthurian tradition. His 1995 book provided an updated critical edition of the Daniel text, revised to incorporate the readings of a newly discovered Daniel manuscript. In his 2003 book, he presented a dual-language (Middle High German and English), facing-page edition of the Daniel text; in the introduction, he analyzed this work, providing historical information and textual notes, while highlighting its new level of originality within the genre – a significant departure from earlier, epigonic German Arthurian literature. In 2015, he published a revised and expanded third edition of the critical text of Daniel; so as to make the Middle High German text more readily accessible to non-expert readers, a second apparatus – a comprehensive textual commentary – featured linguistic, syntactical and lexicographical elucidations of the individual verses. Additionally, he has also authored journal articles, book chapters, encyclopedia entries and book reviews over the course of his career.

== Awards and honors ==
- 1969 – Phi Beta Kappa
- 1970 – Woodrow Wilson Fellowship
- 1970–71 – Fulbright–DAAD Combined Research Grant to Germany
- 1980–81 – National Endowment for the Humanities Fellowship
- 1997 – Phi Beta Kappa Teaching Award, Omicron chapter of Massachusetts, Boston College
- 2014 – Bundesverdienstkreuz, Federal Republic of Germany

== Bibliography ==
=== Books ===
- Der Stricker. Daniel von dem Blühenden Tal. (1983) ISBN 3-484-21192-X, 3-484-20192-4
- Erec by Hartmann von Aue. Translation, Introduction, Commentary. (1987) ISBN 0-8122-8074-1, 0-8122-1247-9
- Daniel of the Blossoming Valley by der Stricker. Translation with Introduction and Notes. (1990) ISBN 0-8240-1515-0
- Der Stricker. Daniel von dem Blühenden Tal. Second revised edition. (1995) ISBN 3-484-20192-4
- German Romances, 1: Daniel von dem Blühenden Tal by der Stricker. (2003) ISBN 0-85991-793-2
- Der Stricker. Daniel von dem Blühenden Tal. Third revised and expanded edition. (2015) ISBN 978-3-11-034328-1
