= William O. Wheatley Jr. =

American television producer

William O. Wheatley Jr. (born c. 1944) is a retired executive vice president for NBC News, responsible for domestic and international news gathering, hard-news programming, relationships with international broadcasters and news agencies and print partnerships. In addition, he was also involved in matters of standards and practices, and co-authored NBC News Policies and Guidelines.

== Career and education ==
Wheatley grew up in The Bronx, and graduated in 1962 from All Hallows High School. He began his career as a management trainee at NBC-affiliate WBZ-TV in Boston in 1968, shortly after graduating from Boston College with a B.A. in history in 1967. While at WBZ-TV, he attended Boston University, from which he received an M.S. in journalism in 1970. He rose quickly through the ranks at WBZ, eventually becoming news director in 1973.

Wheatley first joined NBC News as an assignment editor in January 1975, later becoming a producer and executive. In 1979, Wheatley became senior producer of NBC News with Tom Brokaw, and served as executive producer of the program from 1985 to 1990. During that period, NBC's Nightly News was the recipient of numerous DuPont-Columbia, Emmy and Overseas Press Club awards.

Wheatley was closely associated throughout his NBC career with the network's coverage of national politics, and was executive producer of many election night specials broadcast on NBC. He also served as the executive producer of a number of NBC News documentaries and specials, including the network's live broadcast of the fall of the Berlin Wall in 1989.

Wheatley interrupted his career at NBC News twice to study at Harvard University as a Nieman Fellow and as a Shorenstein Fellow at the John F. Kennedy School of Government.

He is president of the advisory board of the Nieman Foundation, and also serves on the advisory committees of the Knight International Fellowships and the College of Communication at Boston University.

In June 2005, Wheatley retired after 30 years with NBC News.
