= Laura O'Dwyer =

Educational researcher

Laura Mary O'Dwyer
- Education: Boston College
- Scientific career
- Workplaces: Boston College
- Thesis: Extending the application of multilevel modeling to data from the Third International Mathematics and Science Study (TIMSS) (2000)

Laura Mary O'Dwyer is a professor of Measurement, Evaluation, and Statistics at Boston College known for her work on examining the impact of technology in education, especially science education, and for quantifying outcomes for K-12 student success.

== Education and career ==
O'Dwyer has a B.Sc. (1992) and an M.Sc. (1993) from the National University of Ireland. She earned her Ph.D. from Boston College in 2000, where she worked on modeling data from the Trends in International Mathematics and Science Study. Following her Ph.D., she worked at University of Massachusetts Lowell until she joined the faculty of Boston College in 2006. O'Dwyer is an associate editor of Irish Educational Studies journal and co-edited a special edition of Journal of Technology, Learning and Assessment on the topic of One-to-one computing.

In September 2021, the National Science Foundation announced funding for new Science and Technology Centers and O'Dwyer is participating in the center being led by Woods Hole Oceanographic Institution.

== Research ==
O'Dwyer is known for her application of statistical tools to qualitative data, particularly with respect to analysis of educational outcomes. Her textbook, Quantitative Research for the Qualitative Researcher, was published in 2014. O'Dwyer's graduate research examined data from the Trends in International Mathematics and Science Study, a study which she has further examined to compare success in math across different nations. O'Dwyer has examined math education in the K-12 setting, especially algebra using on-line classes and the perception and assessment of ability in math. In 2016, O'Dwyer received funding from the National Science Foundation to increase student success in algebra. For high school students, O'Dwyer has examined their understanding of models in the study of biology, physics and chemistry. O'Dwyer has also assessed the use of technology in the classroom, specifically the impact of assigning individual laptops to students and teachers in classrooms. Her research on one-to-one computing includes quantifying how these programs influence teaching in the classroom and she has examined how e-learning benefits teachers in addition to the students. Locally, O'Dwyer applies her research to analysis of elementary education, as she did in her town of Milton, Massachusetts in an examination of foreign language classes in 2012.

== Selected publications ==
O'Dwyer has an h-index of 32 at Google Scholar, and as of September 2021 has over 5800 citations to her publications.

- O'Dwyer, Laura; Russell, Michael; Bebell, Damian; Tucker-Seeley, Kevon R. (1 January 2005). "Examining the Relationship Between Home and School Computer Use and Students' English/Language Arts Test Scores". The Journal of Technology, Learning and Assessment. 3 (3). ISSN 1540-2525.
- Russell, Michael; Bebell, Damian; O'Dwyer, Laura; O'Connor, Kathleen (1 September 2003). "Examining Teacher Technology Use: Implications for Preservice and Inservice Teacher Preparation". Journal of Teacher Education. 54 (4): 297–310. doi:10.1177/0022487103255985. ISSN 0022-4871. S2CID 40943904.
- O'Dwyer, Laura M.; Bernauer, James A. (2014). Quantitative research for the qualitative researcher. Los Angeles. ISBN 978-1412997799.
- Peoples, Shelagh M.; O’Dwyer, Laura M.; Wang, Yang; Brown, Jessica J.; Rosca, Camelia V. (April 2014). "Development and application of the Elementary School Science Classroom Environment Scale (ESSCES): measuring student perceptions of constructivism within the science classroom". Learning Environments Research. 17 (1): 49–73. doi:10.1007/s10984-013-9152-8. S2CID 144163422.

== Awards and honors ==
- Bruce H. Choppin Award, International Association for the Evaluation of Educational Achievement (2002)
- Teaching with New Media Award, Boston College (2008, 2012)
- Outstanding Research Award, Division E of the American Education Research Association (AERA, with Paul Poteat and Ethan Mereish; 2014)
- AERA Learning Environments SIG/Springer Award for best paper, American Education Research Association (with Peoples, Wang, Brown, and Rosca; 2014)
