= Karen Bullock =

American sociologist

- Occupations: Sociologist, clinical social worker, and academic

Academic background
- Education: North Carolina State University, (B.S.W., 1990); Columbia University, (MS, 1992); Boston University, (PhD, 2000)

Karen Bullock is an American medical sociologist, clinical social worker, and an academic research scholar. She is the Ahearn Endowed Professor at the Boston College School of Social Work.

Bullock is best known for her work on health equity and health disparities. Her work primarily focuses on cultural competence, diversity, and palliative care and has been published in academic journals including Journal of social work in end-of-life & palliative care and Journal of the American Geriatrics Society.

== Education ==
Bullock obtained a Bachelor of Social Work degree from North Carolina State University in 1990 and a Master of Science in Social Work from Columbia University in 1992. Later, she completed her Ph.D. in Sociology and Social Work from Boston University in 2000.

== Career ==
Bullock began her academic career in 1994 by joining Salem State College, where she served multiple appointments including serving as an Adjunct Lecturer at the School of Social Work and Department of Sociology from 1994 to 1995 and an assistant professor at the School of Social Work from 1995 to 1999. She also briefly held an appointment as an assistant professor at the University of North Carolina-Wilmington for three years (1999–2002). In 2002, she joined the University of Connecticut and held various appointments, including assistant professor at the School of Social Work from 2002 to 2007 and associate professor from 2007 to 2012. From 2011 to 2022, she held multiple appointments at North Carolina State University, serving as associate professor from 2011 to 2013 and as a professor and Head of the School of Social Work from 2013 to 2022. As of August 2022, she is the Ahearn Endowed Professor at the Boston College, School of Social Work.

From 2018 to 2022, she served as the treasurer and as a member of the board of directors for the National Association of Social Work Deans and Directors (NADD). During this time, she concurrently served on the Serious Illness Care Taskforce at both the National Academies of Sciences, Engineering, and Medicine and the North Carolina Institute of Medicine from 2020 to 2023. Additionally, she also served on the Taskforce on Healthy Aging at the North Carolina Institute of Medicine between 2022 and 2023.

== Research ==
Bullock has authored numerous publications spanning the areas of mental health, clinical practice, hospice, and end-of-life care including articles in peer-reviewed journals.

=== Cultural dimensions in healthcare ===
While examining the disparities in end-of-life care decision-making between Black and White community-dwelling residents, her study discovered that unique cultural beliefs, values, and communication styles can impede the provision of appropriate end-of-life care further recommending that healthcare providers should take note of these cultural differences and develop cultural competence to improve the quality of care they provide. She also evaluated the role of African American Baptist clergy members in offering mental health assistance to elderly members of their congregations and developed a framework of pastoral care to aid and enhance the mental health assistance offered in African American churches. In her investigation of the characteristics related to diversity and its impact on people's understanding of healthcare information in the area of traumatology, her study revealed significant variations in the level of health literacy among distinct groups such as racial and ethnic minorities, women, men, as well as individuals from diverse socio-economic and educational backgrounds and highlighted the importance of cultural competence as a standard of care and the need to address racial disparities in the utilization of trauma-informed care.

=== Aging and mental healthcare ===
Bullock created a social work training model to equip practitioners with the necessary skills to support older homeless adults facing behavioral health and substance use challenges, utilizing a sequential transition between multiple field settings to provide a diverse range of practical experiences. While investigating the challenges and achievements encountered during the application of interprofessional education (IPE) within the School of Social Work, her research emphasized the significance of incorporating integration, supervision, and expertise, in order to establish effective interprofessional healthcare teams. The findings of the study further highlighted the importance of implementing IPE in academic institutions that lack medical programs to encourage a collaborative approach to integrated care through interprofessional teams. In related research, she highlighted the challenges faced by African American or Latino individuals in accessing hospice and palliative care due to a lack of culturally competent clinicians and health inequity and proposed a community-based outreach approach integrating a faith-based/spiritual care curriculum to train outreach workers in supporting older adults with serious illnesses, with a specific focus on advanced care planning (ACP) and addressing potential barriers to equitable care.

=== Palliative care ===
Bullocks' palliative care research has focused on interventions to address depression, anxiety, grief, and existential distress, as well as interventions to support families and caregivers. While analyzing the significance of upholding professional limits in the context of hospice care, her study brought to attention the difficulties that hospice social workers and other members of the interdisciplinary team may confront with regard to maintaining appropriate professional boundaries and emphasized that hospice organizations should establish explicit policies and protocols aimed at aiding staff in upholding robust professional boundaries. Focusing her research efforts on the impact of trauma in the planning of palliative and hospice care for families and patients of dementia care services, her research highlighted the prevalence of dementia among older adults, especially those from minority groups, and is often diagnosed in later stages and stressed the importance of community-based outreach and education to increase awareness about trauma, hospice, and end-of-life care. During her investigation of the perception of patients and families registered in a hospice program, she discovered significant changes in attitudes towards hospice, emphasizing the importance of soliciting feedback and providing information about eligibility and services.

== Awards and honors ==
- 2009 – Women of Color Service Award, University of Connecticut
- 2009 – Advanced Clinical Supervision Certificate, Smith College School for Social Work, Northampton, MA
- 2014 – Excellence in Cancer Education and Leadership (ExCEL) Certificate, City of Hope National Medical Center/ Beckman Research Institute
- 2021 – Gerontology Society of America (GSA) Fellow Award
- 2023 – Commencement Speaker, Columbia University School of Social Work

== Selected articles ==
- Bullock, K. (2006). Promoting advance directives among African Americans: A faith-based model. Journal of Palliative Medicine, 9(1), 183–195.
- Fried, T. R., Bullock, K., Iannone, L., & O'leary, J. R. (2009). Understanding advance care planning as a process of health behavior change. Journal of the American Geriatrics Society, 57(9), 1547–1555.
- Bullock, K. (2011). The influence of culture on end-of-life decision making. Journal of social work in end-of-life & palliative care, 7(1), 83–98.
- Rhodes, R. L., Barrett, N. J., Ejem, D. B., Sloan, D. H., Bullock, K., Bethea, K., ... & Johnson, K. S. (2022). A review of race and ethnicity in hospice and palliative medicine research: representation matters. Journal of Pain and Symptom Management.
- Silvers, A., Sinclair, S., Curseen, K., Chambers, B., Bullock, K., & Bowman, B. (2022). How Medicare Advantage Could Address Pain Inequities For Black Patients Living With Serious Illness. Health Affairs Forefront.
- Jones, K. F., Laury, E., Sanders, J. J., Starr, L. T., Rosa, W. E., Booker, S. Q., ... & Meghani, S. H. (2022). Top ten tips palliative care clinicians should know about delivering antiracist care to Black Americans. Journal of Palliative Medicine, 25(3), 479–487.
- Bullock-Johnson, R., & Bullock, K. (2022). Advance directives and the influence of cultural dynamics. In Altilio, T. & Otis-Green, S. (Eds.), Oxford textbook of palliative social work (pp. 580-587). New York, NY: Oxford University Press.
- Wallace, C. L., Coccia, K., Khoo, Y. M., & Bullock, K. (2023). Meaning of Hospice Care: Perceptions of Patients and Families. American Journal of Hospice and Palliative Medicine®, 10499091221149702.
- Zehm, A., Smith, S., Schaefer, K. G., Jonas, D., Bullock, K., Edwards, R. L., ... & Merel, S. E. (2023). Development of Objectives to Inform a National Standardized Primary Palliative Care Curriculum for Health Professions Students. Journal of Palliative Medicine.
- Bullock, K., & Bullock-Johnson, R. (2023). Cultural humility: Necessary but insufficient for equitable access to care. In Doka, K.J., Jennings, B., Kirk, T.W., & Tucci, A.S. (Eds.), End-of-Life Ethics in a Changing World (pp. 73-85). Washington, DC: Hospice Foundation of America Press.
