= Matthew Liebmann =

American archaeologist and writer

- Born: Matthew J. Liebmann
- Education: Boston College; University of Pennsylvania
- Occupations: Archaeologist, writer

Matthew J. Liebmann is an American archaeologist and writer. He is the Peabody Professor of American Archaeology and Ethnology in the department of anthropology at Harvard University.

In 2012, Liebmann wrote the book Revolt: An Archaeological History of Pueblo Resistance and Revitalization in 17th Century New Mexico, published by the University of Arizona Press.

In 2024, Liebmann was given the title of Harvard College Professor, "for commitment to undergraduate teaching".
