= Kim Garcia =

American woman poet

Kim Garcia is an American poet, writer and teacher. She currently teaches creative writing at Boston College. Garcia’s poetics integrate writing as a contemplative practice, and her poems often incorporate research to explore themes both personal and political.

== Life and education ==
Garcia graduated from Reed College with a B.A. in English Literature. She earned her MA in Fiction at the Florida State University Creative Writing Program and completed her MFA in Poetry at the University of Houston Creative Writing Program.

== Publications and achievements ==
Garcia has worked in a number of genres, including fiction, creative non-fiction, screenplay and poetry, her principal genre. Her book-length collections of poetry include Madonna Magdalene, The Brighter House, and DRONE. In 2015, The Brighter House won the White Pine Press Poetry Prize, and DRONE won the Backwaters Prize in Poetry.

Creative collaboration is an important theme in Garcia’s writing and teaching. For instance, she has served as a consultant and screenwriter for the Turtle Island Tales series of short educational videos for Native American children and their families. From 2013 to 2017 she worked closely with Edward Hirsch to curate the Arts and the Culture of Democracy series at the Boston College Clough Center for the Study of Constitutional Democracy.

Garcia’s work has been recognized by the 2020 Tupelo Broadside Prize in Poetry, the 2018 Dogwood Literary Prize in Poetry, and the 2014 Lynda Hull Memorial Prize. Earlier awards include the XJ Kennedy Award and an Oregon Arts Commission Individual Artist Grant. She has also received a number of Artist’s Residency Fellowships from the Hambidge Center for the Creative Arts in Rabun Gap, Georgia.

== Selected works ==
- Madonna Magdalene (2006)
- DRONE (2016)
- Tales of the Sisters (2016)
- The Brighter House (2016)
