= Brian Murphy (writer) =

American journalist

Brian Murphy (born 1959) is a journalist at The Washington Post and the author of several non-fiction books, including The New Men, a chronicle of American seminarians in Rome, and The Root of Wild Madder, about the carpet trade in Iran and Afghanistan. In 2015, Da Capo Press published Murphy's 81 Days Below Zero, the story of World War II Army aviator Leon Crane and his solo survival in the Alaskan wilderness. In 2018, Da Capo published his fourth book, "Adrift", recounting the story of an 1856 shipwreck in the North Atlantic and its sole survivor. He is a graduate of Boston College, where he was an editor at The Heights.

Prior to joining the Post in 2014, Murphy was the Dubai bureau chief for the Associated Press and was the international religion correspondent from 2004 to 2006. He first joined the AP in Boston in 1987 and joined the International Desk in New York City three years later. Murphy was posted to Rome in 1993. In 1997, he was named Athens bureau chief and began regular reporting from Iran.

A veteran foreign correspondent, Murphy has covered stories for the AP in more than 40 countries, including the Rwanda genocide, the Balkan conflicts and the wars in Afghanistan and Iraq. His coverage of religion has included major events such as the death of Pope John Paul II and investigative reports on radical Islam and the rise of Christianity in Africa. In 2020, he was part of a Washington Post team that won the Pulitzer Prize for explanatory journalism for a series on climate change hot spots around the world.
