= Frederick Pratson =

Frederick John Pratson (1935–1989) was an American historian and writer of travel guides. He also wrote articles for The Boston Globe travel section and for trade journals and wrote speeches for business executives. A native of Hartford, Connecticut, he graduated from Boston College in 1957. He died in December 1989, leaving a wife, four sons and two daughters.

His travel guide books covered Canada and parts of the United States. He was also an historian and contributed interviews to the Marine Folklife Centre at the University of Maine.

== Guidebooks ==
- Guide to Western Canada
- Guide to Eastern Canada
- A Guide to Atlantic Canada
- Guide to Cape Cod
- Guide to the Great Attractions of Los Angeles and Beyond
- Guide to the Great Attractions of Orlando and Beyond
- Guide to Washington, D.C. and beyond
- Consumer's Guide to Package Travel Around the World
