= Frederick G. Lawrence =

American philosopher and theologian

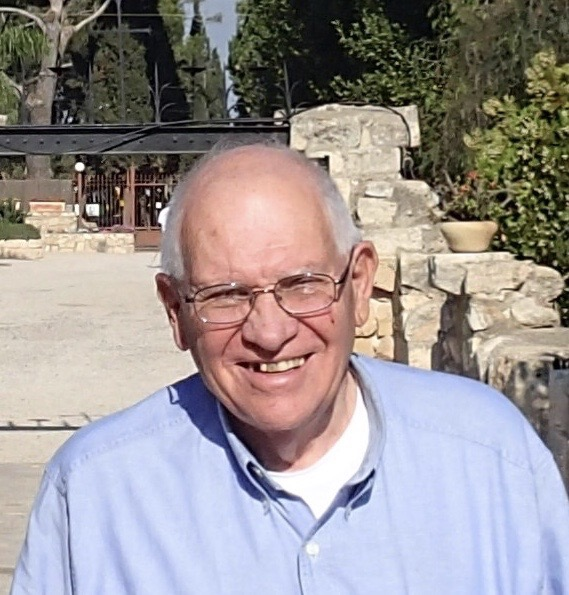
Frederick G. Lawrence

Frederick G. Lawrence is an American hermeneutic philosopher, theologian, and a specialist in Bernard Lonergan, teaching in the Department of Theology at Boston College.

== Life ==
Fred Lawrence (as he is popularly known) is married to Sue Lawrence. He has been running the annual Lonergan Workshop at Boston College for many years, and is editor of Lonergan Workshop, which publishes the proceedings. He also convened the First and Second International Lonergan Conferences at Rome (2001) and Toronto (2004), and the Third and Fourth International Lonergan Conferences at Mainz and Jerusalem (2013) respectively.

Lawrence was a student of Bernard Lonergan at the Gregorian University, Rome, and is today one of the foremost interpreters of Lonergan's thought and an acknowledged hermeneutic philosopher in his own right.

He did his PhD on the "unlikely topic" of the hermeneutical circle in the thought of Gadamer and Lonergan. The thesis had the unique distinction of being appreciated by both thinkers. Unfortunately, it has still to be published, though a copy is available at the Lonergan Centre, Boston College, and in microfilm.

He was a personal friend of both Gadamer and Lonergan, and upon his invitation, Gadamer came several semesters to Boston College.

== Work ==
Lawrence has published a large number of articles on Lonergan, though only recently has he published, with the help of his students and collaborators, a volume of essays, The Fragility of Consciousness. He has also translated from German to English, as for example a work of Habermas.

In 2007, 6–8 September, a conference on "Hermeneutics, Postmodernism, Relativism" was held in honour of Fred Lawrence at Divyadaan: Salesian Institute of Philosophy, Nashik, India. Lawrence was scheduled to participate, but in the end could not for reasons of health; he, however, did contribute four papers outlining the contributions of Heidegger, Gadamer and Lonergan to the twentieth century hermeneutic revolution. The papers were published by Divyadaan: Journal of Philosophy and Education.

In 2016, M. Shawn Copeland and Jeremy D. Wilkins published Grace and Friendship: Theological Essays in Honor of Fred Lawrence, from his grateful students, with a Foreword Tribute to Fred and Sue by Frederick E. Crowe, S.J.

== Bibliography ==
- “The Ethics of Authenticity and the Human Good,” The Importance of Insight: Essays in Honour of Michael Vertin, eds. J.J. Liptay and D.S. Liptay (Toronto: University of Toronto Press, 2007), 127-150.
- “The Dialectic Tradition/Innovation and the Possibility of a Theological Method,” Il Teologo e la Storia: Lonergan’s Centenary (1904-2004), eds. Paul Gilbert and Natalino Spaccapelo (Rome: Editrice Pontificia Università Gregoriana, 2006), 249-264.
- “Grace and Friendship: Postmodern Political Theology and God as Conversational,” Il Teologo e la Storia: Lonergan’s Centenary (1904-2004), eds. Paul Gilbert and Natalino Spaccapelo (Rome: Editrice Pontificia Università Gregoriana, 2006), 123-151.
- “Expanding Challenge to Authenticity in Insight: Lonergan’s Hermeneutics of Facticity,” Divyadaan: Journal of Philosophy & Education 15/3 (2004), 427-456.
- “Grace and Friendship,” Gregorianum 85.4 (2004): 795-820.
- “The Fragility of Consciousness: Lonergan and the Postmodern Concern for the Other,“ Theological Studies 54.1 (1993): 55-94.
- “Gadamer and Lonergan: A Dialectical Comparison,” International Philosophical Quarterly 20.1 (1980): 25-47.
- The Fragility of Consciousness: Faith, Reason, and the Human Good, ed. Randall S. Rosenberg and Kevin M. Vander Schel (Toronto: University of Toronto Press, 2017).
