= Philip Strahan =

American economist

Philip E. Strahan is an American economist, currently the John L. Collins, S. J., Chair in Finance at Carroll School of Management, Boston College.
