= Cathy Schoen =

American economist

Cathy Schoen is an American economist at the New York Academy of Medicine. She previously served as the executive director of Commonwealth Fund Council of Economic Advisors and as the senior vice president for Policy, Research, and Evaluation at the Commonwealth Fund. Her research is concentrated on health economics and health care policy.

== Education and career ==
Schoen attended Smith College for her undergraduate career and received a degree in economics. She also holds a master's degree in economics from Boston College. She served as a member of U.S. President Jimmy Carter's health insurance task force in the late 1970s.

== Selected publications ==
- Schoen, Cathy; Osborn, Robin; Doty, Michelle M.; Bishop, Meghan; Peugh, Jordon; Murukutla, Nandita (2007). "Toward Higher-Performance Health Systems: Adults' Health Care Experiences in Seven Countries, 2007". Health Affairs. 26 (6): w717 – w734. doi:10.1377/hlthaff.26.6.w717. PMID 17978360.
- Schoen, Cathy; Osborn, Robin; How, Sabrina K.H.; Doty, Michelle M.; Peugh, Jordon (2008). "In Chronic Condition: Experiences of Patients with Complex Health Care Needs, in Eight Countries, 2008". Health Affairs. 27 (1): w1 – w16. doi:10.1377/hlthaff.28.1.w1. PMID 19008253.
