= Lisa Goodman (psychologist) =

American psychologist

- Born: 1961 (age 64–65)
- Occupation: Professor of Counseling Psychology
- Awards: SPSSI Award for Outstanding Graduate Teaching and Mentoring (2009); Strickland-Daniel Distinguished Mentoring Award (2007)

Academic background
- Education: Wesleyan University (BA); Boston University (MA, PhD)

Lisa A. Goodman (born 1961) is an American counseling psychologist known for her research on domestic violence and violence against women. She is Professor of Counseling Psychology at the Lynch School of Education at Boston College. Goodman is a Fellow of the American Psychological Association, Division of Counseling Psychology.

== Education ==
Goodman earned a Bachelor of Arts degree in psychology from Wesleyan University in 1984. She continued her education at Boston University, where she obtained a M.A. in 1987 and a PhD in Clinical and Community Psychology in 1992. At Boston University, Goodman conducted research on homelessness as a risk factor and indicator of psychological trauma, under the guidance of Leonard Saxe.

== Career ==
Her experience working with women living in homeless shelters led Goodman to focus her doctoral research on the relationship between homelessness and domestic violence. After graduating, Goodman worked as a James Marshall Public Policy Research Fellow for the American Psychological Association. She was a member of the faculty of the University of Maryland (1994–1999) prior to returning to Boston College in 1999.

Goodman received the 2014 Elizabeth Hurlock Beckman Award for higher education faculty who have inspired students to make a difference in their communities, the 2009 Society for the Psychological Study of Social Issues (SPSSI) Award for Outstanding Graduate Teaching and Mentoring, and the 2007 Bonnie Strickland-Jessica Henderson Daniel Distinguished Mentoring Award from the Society for the Psychology of Women (APA Division 35). Goodman was recipient of SPSSI's Louise Kidder Early Career Award for Contributions to Social Issues Research in 1996.

Goodman is a co-author (with Deborah Epstein) of Listening to Battered Women: A Survivor-entered Approach to Advocacy, Mental Health, and Justice (2008) and co-author (with Mary Koss, Angela Browne, Louise Fitzgerald, Gwendolyn Puryear Keita, and Nancy Felipe Russo) of No Safe Haven: Male Violence Against Women at Home, at Work, and in the Community (1994).

Goodman has served on the editorial boards of the Journal of Adversity and Resilience, Journal for Social Action in Counseling and Psychology, Journal of Counseling Psychology, Psychology of Violence, and Violence Against Women. She was named the 2012 Consulting Editor of the Year for Psychology of Violence.

Goodman has worked with community agencies including Planned Parenthood, Futures Without Violence, and the American Civil Liberties Union, and the Domestic Violence Evidence Project. She is a member of the Research Advisory Board of the National Latin@ Network and is co-founder of the Domestic Violence Program Evaluation and Research Collaborative.

Her research has been supported by grants from the National Institute of Mental Health and the National Institute of Justice.

== Representative publications ==
- Goodman, L. A., Cattaneo, L. B., Thomas, K., Woulfe, J., Chong, S. K., & Smyth, K. F. (2015). Advancing domestic violence program evaluation: Development and validation of the Measure of Victim Empowerment Related to Safety (MOVERS). Psychology of Violence, 5(4), 355–366.
- Goodman, L. A., Corcoran, C., Turner, K., Yuan, N., & Green, B. L. (1998). Assessing traumatic event exposure: General issues and preliminary findings for the Stressful Life Events Screening Questionnaire. Journal of Traumatic Stress, 11(3), 521–542.
- Goodman, L. A., Liang, B., Helms, J. E., Latta, R. E., Sparks, E., & Weintraub, S. R. (2004). Training counseling psychologists as social justice agents: Feminist and multicultural principles in action. The Counseling Psychologist, 32(6), 793–836.
- Goodman, L. A., Koss, M. P., Fitzgerald, L. F., Russo, N. F., & Keita, G. P. (1993). Male violence against women: Current research and future directions. American Psychologist, 48(10), 1054–1058.
- Goodman, L. A., Rosenberg, S. D., Mueser, K. T., & Drake, R. E. (1997). Physical and sexual assault history in women with serious mental illness: prevalence, correlates, treatment, and future research directions. Schizophrenia Bulletin, 23(4), 685–696.
- Goodman, L. A., Saxe, L., & Harvey, M. (1991). Homelessness as psychological trauma: Broadening perspectives. American Psychologist, 46(11), 1219–1225.
