= Nasser Behnegar =

American political scientist

Education
- Education: University of Chicago (BA, MA, PhD)
- Thesis: Leo Strauss's Critique of Historicism (1993)

Philosophical work
- Era: 21st-century philosophy
- Region: Western philosophy
- Institutions: Boston College
- Main interests: foundations of liberalism, religion-politics relation, foundations of the social sciences

Nasser Behnegar is an American political scientist and associate professor of Political Science at Boston College. He is known for his work on Leo Strauss's thought.

== Books ==
- Leo Strauss, Max Weber, And The Scientific Study Of Politics. University of Chicago Press 2005 (Chinese translation, Hermes, 2010)
