= Jean M. Bartunek =

American management scientist

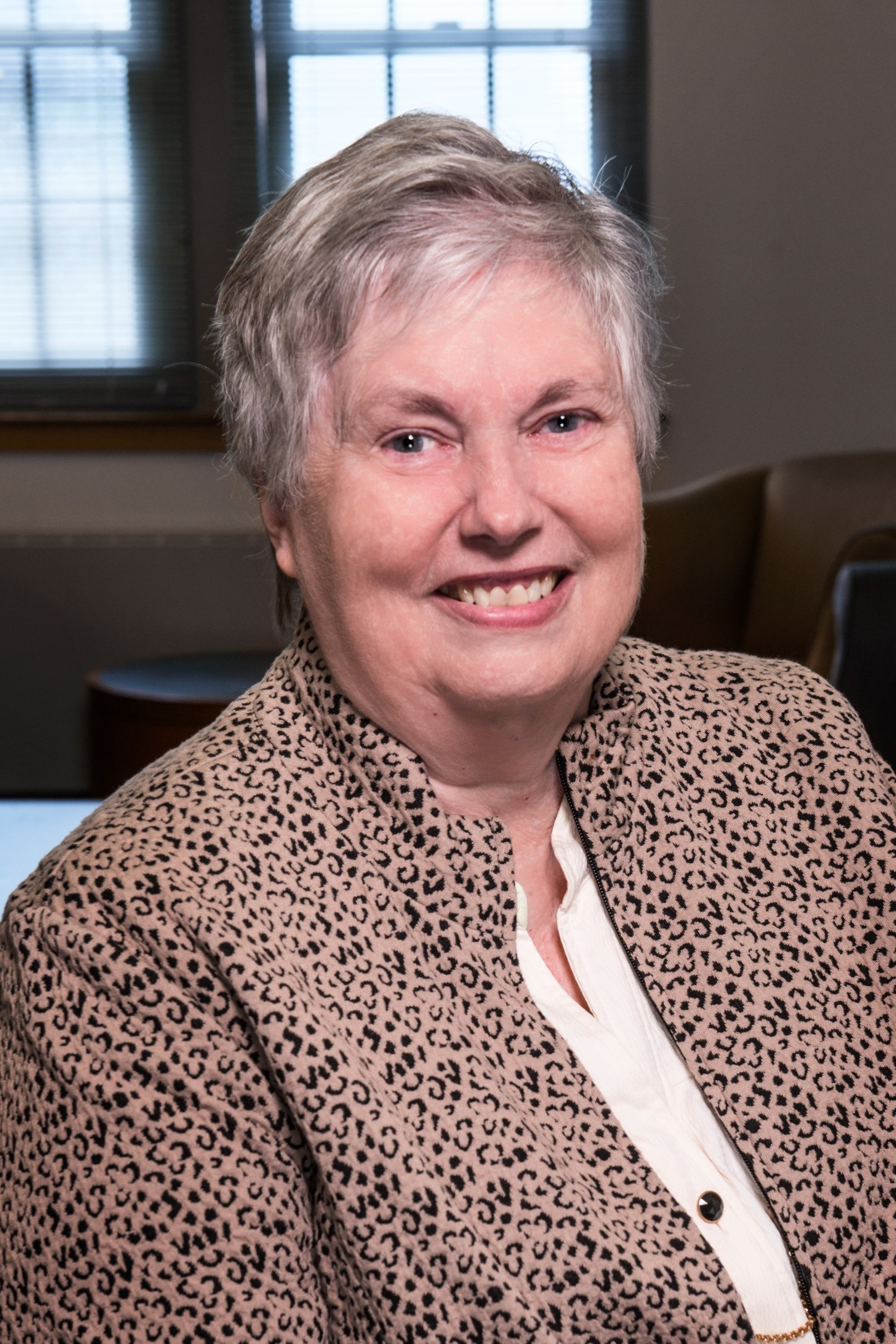
- Jean M. Bartunek
- Born: October 25, 1944 (age 81); Cleveland, Ohio, U.S.
- Known for: Organizational change and transformation Academic–practitioner relationships Dialectical and paradoxical processes
- Title: Robert A. and Evelyn J. Ferris Professor of Management and Organization
- Awards: Academy of Management Career Distinguished Service Award (2009); Honorary Doctor of Laws, University of Roehampton (2012); Honorary Doctor of Business Administration, University of Bath (2015); Distinguished International Scholar Award, Irish Academy of Management (2024)

Academic background
- Education: Maryville University (B.A.); University of Illinois at Chicago (M.A., Ph.D.)

Jean M. Bartunek (born October 25, 1944) is an American management scientist whose research interests include organizational change, academic-practitioner relationships, and dialectical and paradoxical processes. She is the Robert A. and Evelyn J. Ferris Chair and Professor of Management and Organization at the Carroll School of Management, Boston College, and a past president of the Academy of Management.

== Education and career ==
Bartunek was born in Cleveland, Ohio, and is a member of the Society of the Sacred Heart (RSCJ). She received a B.A. cum laude from Maryville University (St. Louis) in 1966, an M.A. in social and organizational psychology from the University of Illinois at Chicago in 1974, and a Ph.D. in social and organizational psychology from the same institution in 1976.

From 1976-1977, she was a visiting assistant professor of Organizational Behavior at the University of Illinois at Urbana Champaign before joining the faculty of the Carroll School of Management at Boston College as an assistant professor in 1977. She rose to full professor in 1990 and has held the Robert A. and Evelyn J. Ferris Chair since 2004. She served as chairperson of the Management and Organization Department (1992-1995) and interim department chair (2017).

Bartunek has held numerous leadership roles in the Academy of Management (AOM), including serving on the executive committee of the Organization Development and Change Division (1986-1991), representative-at-large on the Board of Governors (1994-1997) and the Executive Committee/Board of Governors (1998-2003), during which she progressed through the presidential succession of: program chair-elect/vice president-elect (1998-1999), program chair/vice president (1999-2000), president-elect/chair of the professional divisions (2000-2001), the 57th president (2001-2002), and past-president (2002-2003). She later chaired the Ethics Adjudication Committee (2009-2012).

She has been a member of the Board of Trustees at Maryville University since 2003.

== Research ==
Bartunek's research centers on organizational change and transformation, with particular attention to relationships between change agents and recipients, planned versus emergent change, and processes of sensemaking, social cognition, affect, and conflict in organizations. She has also written extensively on academic-practitioner relationships, the gap between rigor and relevance in management research, and the development of evidence-based management. Her work on these topics has focused on dialectical processes, including tensions and paradoxes, and how processes may be handled.

== Editorial and professional service ==
Bartunek has served as associate editor of several leading journals: the Journal of Applied Behavioral Science (2005-2018), Academy of Management Learning & Education (2012-2014), and Academy of Management Review (2015-2018; 2023). She has co-edited special research forums and topic forums for the Academy of Management Journal, the Academy of Management Review, and the British Journal of Management. She chaired the advisory committee for the Academy of Management Journal (2004-2007), and was a member of the advisory committee for the Academy of Management Discoveries (2013-2017). From 2008 to 2010 she was a visiting international fellow of the Advanced Institute of Management Research (UK).

She is a Fellow of the Academy of Management (elected 1999). She served on the Fellows’ membership committee (2009-2011, chair 2011). She was deputy dean of the Fellows (2015-2017) and dean (2017-2020). She is also a Fellow of the British Academy of Management (elected 2018), and the Center for Evidence-Based Management (2016–present).

== Books ==
Bartunek's books include:

- Creating Alternative Realities at Work: The Quality of Work Life Experiment at FoodCom (with M. K. Moch, Harper Business, 1990)
- Hidden Conflict in Organizations: Uncovering Behind-the-scenes Disputes (edited with D. Kolb, Sage, 1992)
- Insider/Outsider Team Research (with M. R. Louis, Sage, 1996)
- Organizational and Educational Change: The life and role of a change agent group (Lawrence Erlbaum Associates, 2003)
- Church Ethics and its Organizational Context: Learnings from the Sex Abuse Scandal in the Catholic Church (edited with M. A. Hinsdale and J. F. Keenan, Rowman & Littlefield, 2006)
- Academic-Practitioner Relationships: Developments, Complexities, and Opportunities (edited with J. McKenzie, Routledge, 2018)
- Delivering Impact in Management Research: When Does it Really Happen? (with R. Macintosh, K. Mason, and N. Beech, Routledge, 2021)
- Social Scientists Confronting Global Crises (edited, Routledge, 2022)

== Recognition ==
Bartunek received the Academy of Management’s Career Distinguished Service Award in 2009. She has received multiple best reviewer awards from the Academy of Management Journal (2005, 2006, 2007, 2015), Academy of Management Discoveries (2017) and Academy of Management Review (2021, 2022). She won the best paper awards from Human Relations (2008) and the Journal of Applied Behavioral Science (2006). She also received the Journal of Management Scholarly Impact Award (with Sara Rynes, 2019).

She was awarded honorary doctorates: Doctor of Laws (honoris causa) from the University of Roehampton (2012) and Doctor of Business Administration (honoris causa) from the University of Bath (2015).

In 2024 she received the Distinguished International Scholar Award from the Irish Academy of Management. In 2025 she won the Organization Development and Change Thought Leader award, from the International Society of Organization Development Consultants.
