= Paul Schervish =

American sociologist

Paul G. Schervish
- Born: April 6, 1946 (age 79); Detroit, Michigan
- Education: University of Detroit Mercy; Northwestern University; Jesuit School of Theology at Berkeley; University of Wisconsin–Madison
- Known for: Research on philanthropy
- Scientific career
- Fields: Sociology
- Thesis: Vulnerability and Power in Market Relations: The Structural Determinants of Unemployment (1980)

Paul G. Schervish (born April 6, 1946) is an American sociologist and former Jesuit priest who specializes in the academic study of philanthropy. He is a professor emeritus of sociology at Boston College, where he formerly served as director of the Center on Wealth and Philanthropy prior to its closure in 2015. During the 2000–01 academic year, he was a Fulbright Scholar at University College Cork. He has been named to the NonProfit Times' annual "Power and Influence Top 50" list five times.
