= William J. McGarry =

American Jesuit educator and theologian

The Reverend William J. McGarry SJ
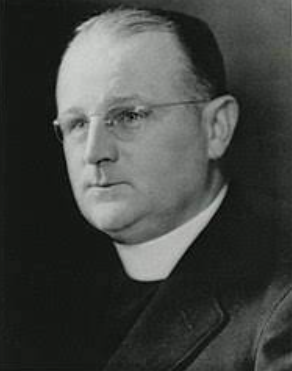
- McGarry c. 1938

18th President of Boston College
- In office 1937–1939
- Preceded by: Louis J. Gallagher
- Succeeded by: William J. Murphy

Personal details
- Born: William James McGarry; March 14, 1894 Hamilton, Massachusetts, U.S.
- Died: September 23, 1941 (aged 47) New York City, U.S.
- Resting place: Weston College Cemetery
- Education: Woodstock College (STD); Pontifical Biblical Institute (SSL)

Orders
- Ordination: June 28, 1925 by Michael Joseph Curley

William James McGarry SJ (March 14, 1894 – September 23, 1941) was an American Catholic priest, Jesuit, and theologian who was the president of Boston College from 1937 to 1939. Born in Massachusetts, he received his Doctorate of Sacred Theology from Woodstock College and his Licentiate in Sacred Scripture from the Pontifical Biblical Institute. In 1930, McGarry became a professor of theology and various languages at Weston College, ultimately becoming its prefect of studies in 1934.

In 1937, McGarry became the president of Boston College. During his tenure, he founded the School of Management. After only two years, he was selected to become first editor-in-chief of the newly established journal Theological Studies, before dying suddenly in 1941.

== Early life ==
McGarry was born on March 14, 1894, in Hamilton, Massachusetts. His father was an employee of the Myopia Hunt Club, and his family was relatively wealthy. McGarry attended Hamilton grammar school, and in 1904, and then at Boston College High School. On August 14, 1911, he entered the Society of Jesus, proceeding to the novitiate of St. Andrew-on-Hudson in New York. McGarry's sister later entered the Congregation of St. Joseph.

== Jesuit formation ==
McGarry then went to Woodstock College in Maryland in 1915 for his philosophical studies, where he remained until 1918. He then returned to New York, teaching at Fordham University for four years, during his regency period of Jesuit formation. He initially taught mathematics, and in his second year, he taught the fourth year curriculum of English, Latin, Ancient Greek, and mathematics at Fordham Preparatory School. In his third year, he taught astronomy at the university and physics, history, and Spanish at the high school. When the dean of the university and high school fell ill, McGarry took over his position in an acting capacity for six months, while continuing to teach classes. In his fourth year, McGarry taught astronomy, French, and mathematics, as well as a philosophy class for pre-medical students, at the university.

From 1922 to 1926, McGarry returned to Woodstock College for his theological studies, where he received a Doctorate of Sacred Theology. On June 28, 1925, he was ordained a priest by the Archbishop of Baltimore, Michael Joseph Curley, in Dahlgren Chapel at Georgetown University. From 1926 to 1927, McGarry completed his tertianship at St. Andrew-on-Hudson.

While initially scheduled to go to study at the Pontifical Biblical Institute in Rome in 1927, the day before McGarry left, the provincial superior of the Jesuits' newly established New England province instead assigned McGarry to teach Scripture and Hebrew at Weston College in Massachusetts. In 1928, he enrolled at the Pontifical Biblical Institute. Completing his studies in two years rather than the ordinary three, he was awarded a Licentiate in Sacred Scripture in 1930, graduating summa cum laude. During his studies, he also visited the Holy Land.

== Weston College ==
Following his studies, McGarry returned to Weston College. Between 1930 and 1935, he taught Sacred Scripture. For one semester, he also taught natural theology. In addition to his teaching duties, McGarry was the assistant prefect of studies and the dean of philosophy from 1930 to 1934. In 1934, he was made the prefect of studies, the equivalent of dean, a position he held until 1937. He also became the assistant editor of Thought: A Journal of Philosophy in 1934. In 1935, McGarry was appointed a professor of dogmatic theology. He also began teaching Hebrew and Biblical Greek, as well as Syriac, German and philosophical Greek to special groups of students. During the academic year of 1936 to 1937, he also taught a class on the history of Israel at the Graduate School of Arts & Sciences at Boston College.

== Boston College ==
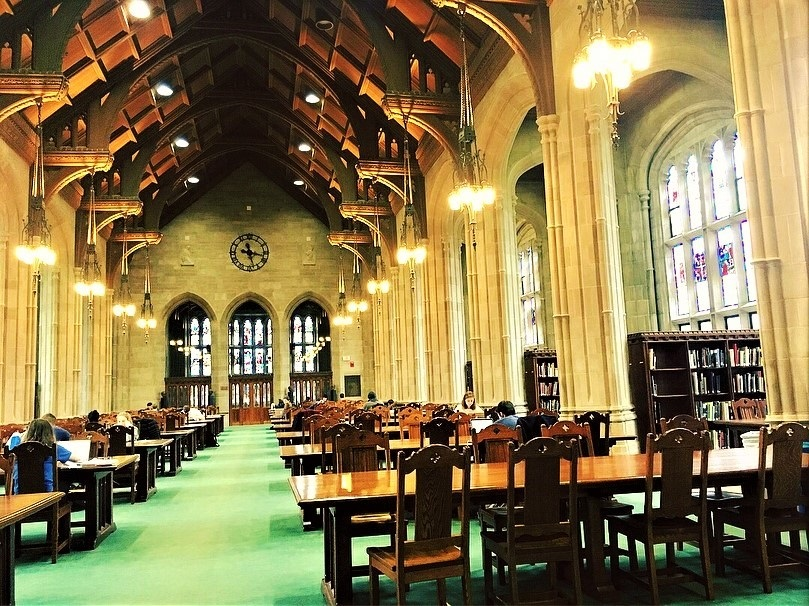
McGarry oversaw completion of the stackroom for Bapst Library.

On July 1, 1937, McGarry was appointed to succeed Louis J. Gallagher as the president of Boston College. At the same time, he also replaced Gallagher as the pastor of the Church of St. Ignatius Loyola. While he initially attempting to maintain a full undergraduate and graduate teaching load in addition to his presidency, this proved untenable after one semester, as his health began to deteriorate. During his tenure, he oversaw completion of Bapst Library's stackroom and expanded its holdings. He also reorganized the administration of the college's Intown Division, which was a two-year, accelerated, pre-law program for preparation to enroll in the Law School. In 1938, Boston College changed its admission requirements, allowing students to substitute an approved secondary school certification for the college's entrance examination. In February 1938, Boston College celebrated the 75th anniversary of its founding for two weeks.

With growing demand for a business school beyond four elective courses in accounting, McGarry appointed James J. Kelley to oversee the creation of the School of Management, including constituting a faculty and creating a curriculum. McGarry also invited 30 prominent businessmen from Boston and New York City to join the business school's advisory board. The first classes were held on September 16, 1938. For this, McGarry is considered the business school's founder.

In the spring of 1938, McGarry's health worsened. Physicians discovered that he had a heart condition since childhood, and he spent time recuperating at the Jesuit retreat center in North Andover. In 1937, Francis X. Talbot, the president of America Press informed McGarry of his desire to establish a Jesuit theology journal in the United States, and that he wanted McGarry to be its first editor-in-chief. In July 1938, McGarry presided over a conference held at Inisfada, at which theology professors from Jesuit colleges in the northeastern United States gathered to decide whether to establish such a journal. The conference unanimously decided to select McGarry to become the editor-in-chief of the new publication, Theological Studies. The provincial superior, James H. Dolan, permitted McGarry's appointment even though he had been president of Boston College for only two years, an unusual occurrence.

McGarry's tenure as president came to an end on August 15, 1939, and he was succeeded by William J. Murphy. He was also succeeded by Murphy as pastor of St. Ignatius Loyola Church.

== Editor of Theological Studies ==
In January 1939, the Jesuit Superior General formally appointed McGarry the editor in chief of Theological Studies, and he took up residence at Campion House in New York City. The first issue was published in February 1940, with much of it written by McGarry. During this time, McGarry also published three books in 1940 and 1941.

== Death ==
In 1940, McGarry's heart condition began to worsen. While in Boston because of his mother's death, he suffered a heart attack on December 24, 1940, in the Cathedral of the Holy Cross. Between February and July 1941, he collapsed, losing consciousness, in public on three separate occasions. On September 23, 1941, while traveling from Campion House to the Sisters of the Cenacle's convent in Ronkonkoma to lead a retreat, he collapsed inside the 59th Street–Columbus Circle subway station. A surgeon arrived and pronounced him dead, and a priest arrived and administered him extreme unction. McGarry's funeral was held in Bapst Library, and he was buried at Weston College. John Courtney Murray succeeded him as editor-in-chief of Theological Studies.

== Works ==
- He Cometh: Devotion and the Liturgy. Vol. 1. New York: The America Press. 1942.
- Paul and the Crucified: The Apostle's Theology of the Cross. New York: The America Press. 1939. OCLC 588711 – via Internet Archive.
- Unto the End: Christ's Discourse on Love. New York: The America Press. 1941. OCLC 6598089 – via Internet Archive.

Academic offices
Preceded by Louis J. Gallagher	18th President of Boston College; 1937–1939	Succeeded by William J. Murphy
New office	1st Editor-in-Chief of Theological Studies; 1939–1941	Succeeded by John Courtney Murray
Catholic Church titles
Preceded by Louis J. Gallagher	3rd Pastor of the Church of St. Ignatius Loyola; 1937–1939	Succeeded by William J. Murphy
