= W. Seavey Joyce =

American Jesuit priest (1913–1988)

The Reverend W. Seavey Joyce SJ
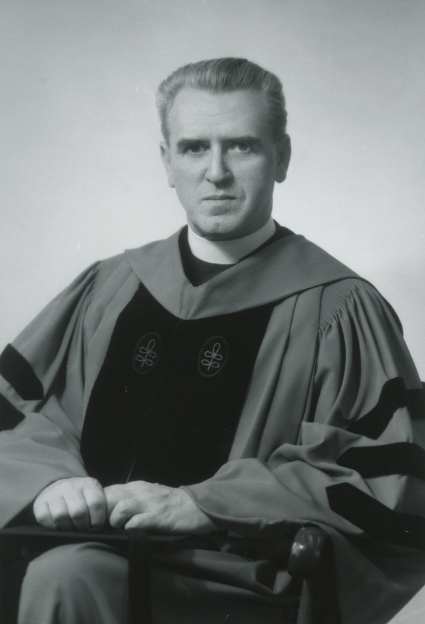

23rd President of Boston College
- In office 1968–1972
- Preceded by: Michael P. Walsh
- Succeeded by: J. Donald Monan

Personal details
- Born: September 3, 1913; Boston, Massachusetts, U.S.
- Died: May 19, 1988 (aged 74); Weston, Massachusetts, U.S.
- Education: Boston College (BA); Harvard University (PhD)

Orders
- Ordination: 1943

William Seavey Joyce SJ (September 3, 1913 – May 19, 1988) was an American Catholic priest and Jesuit who was the president of Boston College from 1968 to 1972. Born in Boston, Massachusetts, he entered the Society of Jesus in 1931 and later received a doctorate in economics from Harvard University. In 1949, Joyce became a professor of economics at Boston College, and later served as the dean of the College of Business Administration and the Graduate School of Management.

In 1968, Joyce was appointed the president of Boston College. His tenure was characterized by great change and major campus unrest, including numerous protests and disruptions by students; Joyce largely acquiesced to students' demands. Amidst controversy, Joyce disbanded the university's ROTC program and dramatically increased the number of black students and university spending on black studies and special black-student programs. Joyce also reorganized Boston College's governance, separating it from the Jesuit order, and implemented changes that reduced the Catholic and Jesuit character of the school. He oversaw several building projects on- and off-campus.

Boston College students, faculty, and alumni widely viewed Joyce's presidency unfavorably, and he resigned in 1971. Afterwards, he spent time engaged in pastoral work in Michigan.

== Early life ==
Joyce was born on September 3, 1913, in the Dorchester neighborhood of Boston, Massachusetts. He was an only child and his father was a policeman. Joyce attended Boston College High School, where he graduated as the valedictorian in June 1931.

That same summer, he entered the Society of Jesus. He later enrolled at Boston College, from which he graduated in 1937. In 1943, Joyce was ordained a priest at Weston College. He continued his studies at Harvard University, earning a Doctor of Philosophy in economics in 1949.

== Boston College ==
In 1949, Joyce returned to Boston College as a professor of economics, where he was made chairman of the department. In 1953, while remaining the chairman, Joyce succeeded James D. Sullivan as the dean of the College of Business Administration. In 1955, Joyce made changes to the College of Business Administration to prepare it for accreditation, and several months later, the school was accredited by the Association to Advance Collegiate Schools of Business. In 1957, the school established its graduate program.

During this time, Boston College hosted a series of conferences, attended by prominent politicians and businessmen in Boston, on the future development of the city. Organized by Joyce, the first annual conference was held on May 15, 1954, in Bapst Auditorium. This conference led to the creation of the Boston Citizens Seminars, which met multiple times per year and discussed urban development, taxation, zoning, and municipal construction. The first seminar met on October 7, 1954, and they continued to be held on the college's campus for 25 years. These seminars played a significant role in the revitalization of Boston's waterfront and transit system.

In 1953, the leadership of Boston College began a long-running discussion about whether to change the name of the institution to reflect its status as a university. In 1957, Joyce wrote a lengthy letter to Boston College's president, Joseph R. N. Maxwell, strongly supporting the name change and proposing as a new name the "Jesuit University of Boston". In May 1958, under the new presidency of Michael P. Walsh, Joyce was appointed chairman of the newly created University Planning Committee, to develop a 10-year plan for the university's growth.

Joyce was involved in the creation of the Metropolitan Area Planning Council in 1963 and was appointed by Massachusetts Governor Endicott Peabody as its first president, holding this position until at least 1967. In 1963, Joyce also became the dean of the Graduate School of Management. In 1966, he became the university's vice president for community relations. At that time, he resigned the position of dean of the business school and was succeeded by its first lay dean, Albert J. Kelley. In 1968, Walsh put Joyce in charge of the Black Talent Program, a scholarship fund for black students at Boston College.

== Presidency of Boston College ==
On May 15, 1968, Joyce was appointed by the Jesuit Superior General, Pedro Arrupe, to succeed Michael P. Walsh as the president of Boston College. He was the last president of the school to be selected by the Jesuit superiors, rather than from within the university. Joyce assumed office on July 1, and was inaugurated on October 20 in the university's first inauguration ceremony.

One of Joyce's first initiatives was to create a board of directors on October 8, 1968, to replace the board of regents. While the regents had only an advisory function, the board of directors was larger and had authority over the ordinary affairs of the university. Meanwhile, the board of trustees, a group of 10 Jesuits, retained control over the selection of the university's president and the right to amend its statutes. The trustees also automatically became directors. This arrangement lasted until 1972, when the two boards were consolidated into a single board of trustees. Joyce then appointed the first lay members to the new board, ending exclusive Jesuit control of the university and causing the Jesuit community to incorporate as an entity separate from the university.

Jesuit influence over academic and campus policies decreased, and Joyce appointed laymen to senior positions. In 1971, the superior of the Jesuit community at Boston College was elevated to the title of rector, a role Joyce had occupied until that point, separating the roles of president and rector. The University Academic Senate (UAS) and the Undergraduate Government of Boston College (UGBC) were also created in 1968. Joyce relocated the president's office from St. Mary's Hall to Botolph House.

=== Campus turmoil ===
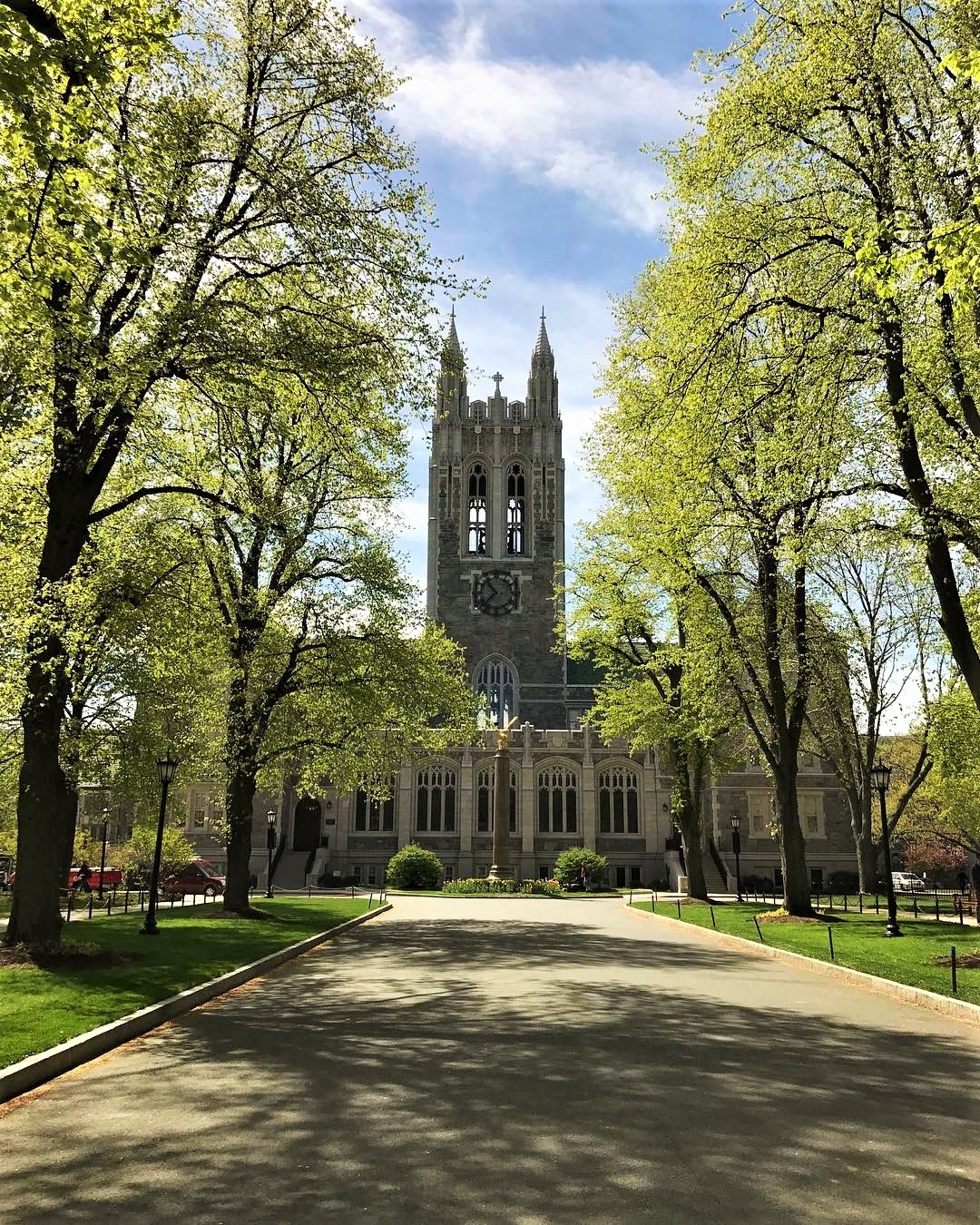
One of many incidents of campus turmoil was the occupation of Gasson Hall by black students in 1970.

Joyce's presidency was characterized by frequent, large protests by students and occupations of buildings by students. Joyce generally conceded to student demands. The first protest occurred in 1968, when students demanded an increase in the number of student positions in the University Academic Senate. The UAS agreed to this demand and students represented 25% of the senate. In 1969, Joyce decided not to grant tenure to Mary Daly, a theology professor, terminating her employment at the school. A petition to reinstate Daly garnered 4,000 signatures and 1,500 students protested at the president's office. Joyce appointed a committee to review the decision and based on the committee's positive recommendation, Joyce reinstated Daly. Another controversy occurred when Joyce replaced the dean of the College of Arts & Sciences with someone more receptive to student protests without the prior input of the faculty. The faculty refused to endorse the appointment of the new dean.

On June 1, 1970, the UAS voted to disband Boston College's Reserve Officer Training Corps (ROTC) program. Joyce agreed with their position and recommended that the board dissolve the program. While the board was considering the proposal, a group of 350 students marched to the ROTC headquarters on campus and a group broke into its offices, destroying military property and records. In October, Joyce notified the commander of ROTC that the university was disbanding the program and requested that it leave campus by June 1, 1971.

The circumstances surrounding the enrollment of the first black students were also contentious. The Black Talent program proved controversial on campus because black students were admitted through a channel separate from the ordinary admission process and were required to meet lower academic standards. Joyce viewed favorably the demands of the Black Forum, composed of black students, for the creation of a black studies department, the appointment of black professors and administrators, the creation of a black endowed chair, and the right of the Black Forum to control the black studies courses, appointment of black faculty, and the admission of black students. With scholarships being issued, and an all-black dormitory created, the cost of the Black Talent program quickly ballooned to five times its original budget, and the number of black students increased dramatically. Tensions grew as black students demanded additional funding and programming while white students and faculty criticized excessive spending. On March 19, 1970, black students took over Gasson Hall, and white students sealed off the building, preventing food from being brought in for the protesters. The protesters left the building at the end of the day.

The student newspaper, The Heights, published interviews slanted in support of controversial interviewees, including pro-contraception activist Bill Baird and the founder of the Yippies, Paul Krassner. Because the university's legal counsel determined that the Krassner interview exposed the university to criminal libel, the administration separated the newspaper legally and financially from the university.

=== Building projects ===
A number of buildings were constructed or renovated during Joyce's presidency. Construction on McGuinn Hall was completed in 1968, shortly after Joyce's appointment. Joyce also oversaw a significant renovation and modernization of Devlin Hall, which was completed in 1969. Bapst Hall auditorium was converted into stacks for the library in January 1970.

Before and during Joyce's presidency, Boston College experienced a severe shortage of student housing. As an interim measure, the university purchased and renovated apartment buildings on South Street. On August 25, 1970, construction began on 43 modular, duplex apartment buildings, which became known as "the Mods", on the site of the filled-in Lawrence Basin reservoir. The university also constructed the Medeiros Townhouses for students living in O'Connell Hall so that the building could be repurposed as a student union, as well as four mid-rise dormitories next to St. Mary's Hall. Finally, students voted to approve a $25 fee to construct the Plex athletic center, which opened in 1972.

=== End of presidency ===
A report about the status of Boston College submitted in 1971 to its board of directors concluded that Joyce's presidency coincided with a period of unprecedented turmoil but that the alumni, faculty, administration, and Jesuits almost universally disapproved of Joyce's handling of problems and criticized the lack of student discipline, the university's finances, and the decline of the school's Catholic and Jesuit identity. On January 1, 1971, the board of trustees announced that Joyce would be replaced as rector of the university's Jesuit community by Francis Nicholson. On January 7, 1972, Joyce submitted his resignation, specifying that he would leave at the end of the year or upon the appointment of a replacement. J. Donald Monan became the president on September 5, 1972.

== Later years ==
After the end of his presidency, Joyce became executive director of the Boston branch of the National Alliance of Businessmen. He also became involved in the Cheswick Center and was a community affairs consultant to the Massachusetts Department of Commerce and the John Hancock Mutual Life Insurance Company. In 1975, he returned to teaching economics at Boston College, where he remained until 1979. In June 1979, he became the pastor of St. Ann Church in Frankfort, Michigan, a position he held until August 1986. Joyce was afterwards the pastor of St. Joseph Church in East Tawas, Michigan, from 1986 to 1988.

In 1988, Joyce took up residence at the Campion Center, a Jesuit residence and nursing home in Weston, Massachusetts. Two weeks later, on May 19, 1988, Joyce died there of liver and pancreatic cancer. His funeral was held at the Church of St. Ignatius Loyola in Chestnut Hill, and he was buried at the Campion Center cemetery.

Academic offices
Preceded by James D. Sullivan	Dean of the College of Business Administration at Boston College; 1953–1966	Succeeded by Albert J. Kelley
Preceded by Michael P. Walsh	23rd President of Boston College; 1968–1972	Succeeded by J. Donald Monan
Catholic Church titles
Preceded by Wilbur Gibbs	15th Pastor of St. Ann Church; 1979–1986	Succeeded by Gabriel Fox
Preceded by Louis Van Bergen	18th Pastor of St. Joseph Church; 1986–1988	Succeeded by Lawrence Boks
