= William J. Murphy (Jesuit) =

American Jesuit educator (1895–1973)

The Reverend William J. Murphy SJ
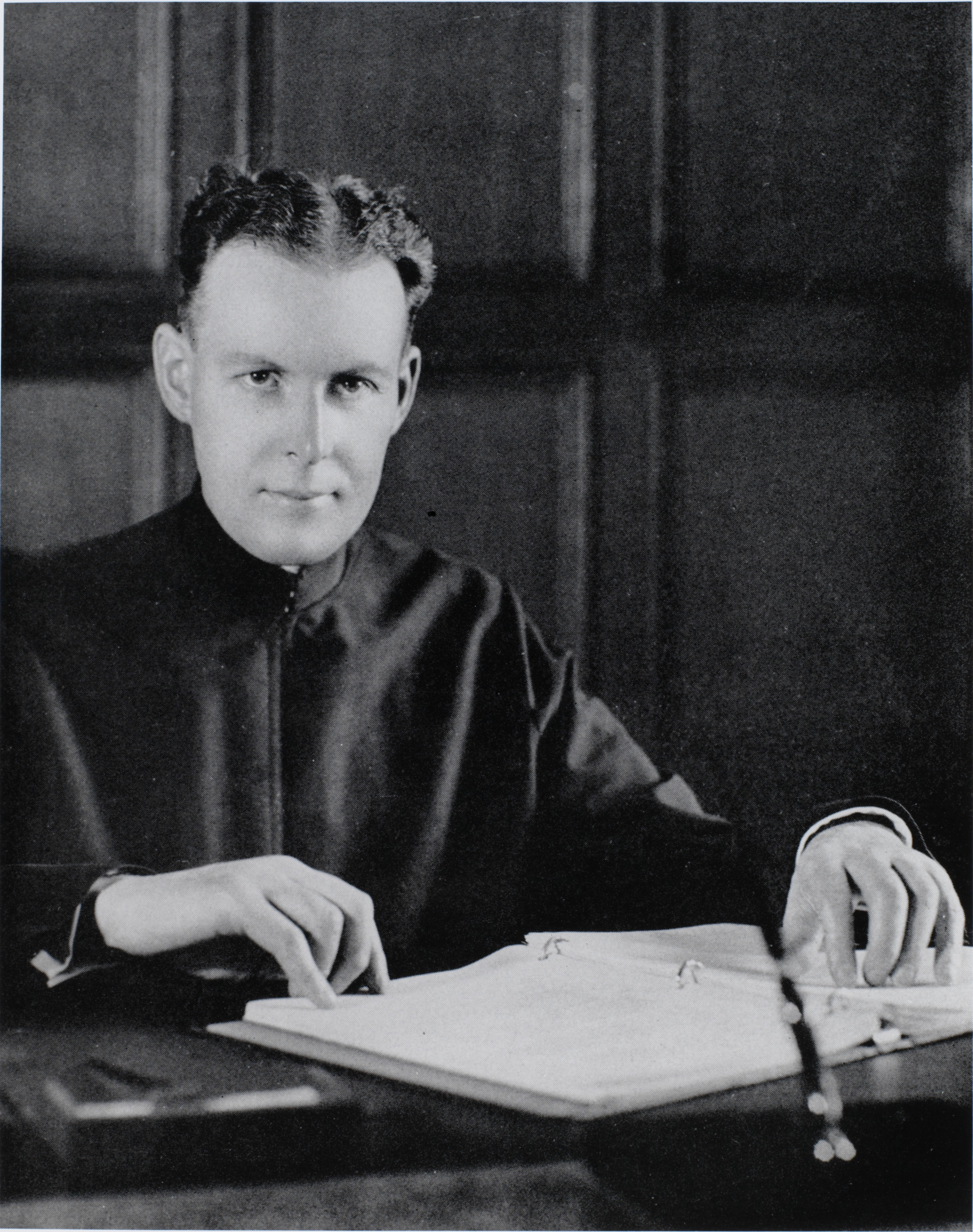
- Murphy c. 1942

19th President of Boston College
- In office 1939–1945
- Preceded by: William J. McGarry
- Succeeded by: William L. Keleher

Personal details
- Born: October 20, 1895 Lawrence, Massachusetts, U.S.
- Died: April 28, 1973 (aged 77) Methuen, Massachusetts, U.S.
- Resting place: Weston College Cemetery
- Education: Boston College; Woodstock College; Weston College

Orders
- Ordination: June 1927

William J. Murphy SJ (October 20, 1895 – April 28, 1973) was an American Catholic priest and Jesuit who was the president of Boston College from 1939 to 1945. Born in Massachusetts, he studied at Boston College for two years before entering the Society of Jesus in 1914. He later studied philosophy at Woodstock College and theology at Weston College, and taught at Fordham University and the College of the Holy Cross. In 1934, he was placed in charge of overseeing the schools in the Jesuit province of New England.

In 1939, Murphy became the president of Boston College. His tenure coincided with World War II, during which the school hosted soldiers in the Army Specialized Training Program. Enrollment dropped significantly, requiring the college to fundraise to continue operating. In 1941, the Archbishop of Boston donated a large estate to Boston College. After the end of his presidency, Murphy became the dean of the Shadowbrook novitiate and was later an instructor of tertians in Connecticut.

== Early life ==
Murphy was born on October 20, 1895, in Lawrence, Massachusetts. The youngest child of Michael J. and Joan Murphy, he had five siblings. Murphy studied at Lawrence High School, where he graduated in 1912 as the salutatorian. In 1912, Murphy enrolled at Boston College.

== Jesuit formation ==
After his sophomore year, on September 7, 1914, Murphy entered the Society of Jesus and proceeded to the Jesuit novitiate of St. Andrew-on-Hudson. He studied languages and literature there from 1914 to 1917. In 1920, he began his philosophical studies at Woodstock College. Afterwards, Murphy spent one year teaching literature to freshmen at Fordham University in New York City, followed by three years teaching the classics at the College of the Holy Cross in Massachusetts. Murphy then studied theology at Woodstock for three years, and later transferred to Weston College. There, he was ordained a priest in June 1927.

After his ordination, Murphy continued his theological studies at Weston College and also taught English to sophomores at Boston College. In 1930, he was sent for further education in Europe. He researched 18th-century literature for two years in Florence, Oxford, and London. Murphy then returned to Boston College, where he lectured at the Graduate School of Arts & Sciences on Dante Alighieri from 1932 to 1935.

In 1934, Murphy became the general prefect of schools of the Jesuits' province of New England. He worked with the leadership of Boston College and the College of the Holy Cross to remove both schools' requirement that students study Ancient Greek to receive a Bachelor of Arts degree, a decision that Boston College was reluctant to take. In 1937, he took on the additional role of assistant to the provincial superior.

== Boston College ==
On August 15, 1939, Murphy was appointed to replace William J. McGarry, who left to lead a new Jesuit theological journal, as the president of Boston College. At the same time, Murphy replaced McGarry as the pastor of the Church of St. Ignatius Loyola in Chestnut Hill.

Just sixteen days after Murphy assumed office, World War II began. The war put a significant strain on Boston College. In 1939, the school opened a civilian pilot training program in conjunction with the Civil Aeronautics Administration. The program operated for three years and nearly all of its graduates were commissioned as pilots in the Army or Navy. In October 1941, Boston College became the first school to participate in the federal government's Engineering, Science, and Management War Training program. After the attack on Pearl Harbor, Murphy; the president of the College of the Holy Cross, Joseph R. N. Maxwell; and the Jesuit provincial superior, James H. Dolan, decided to create an accelerated curriculum to allow students to complete their education in two years before being conscripted into the armed forces. Boston College implemented this curriculum in January 1942. In 1943, the school joined the Army Specialized Training Program (ASTP) and St. Mary's Hall was converted from the Jesuit residence into barracks for 400 soldiers. In 1944, the ASTP was cancelled nationwide in anticipation of D-Day, and the army left campus on June 30, 1944. The significantly reduced study body put a substantial financial strain on the college, requiring it to begin a fundraising campaign in 1944 to allow it to continue operating. From 1944 to 1945, given a greatly increased enrollment at Boston College High School, part of Gasson Hall was used for high school classes.

During Murphy's tenure, a program was created for Jesuits to study the classics, history, and the sciences at the graduate level. The school's football team also excelled, and Murphy celebrated the first Red Mass in Massachusetts on October 4, 1941, which was attended by many dignitaries. In 1941, the college acquired the estate of Louis K. Liggett, which included the mansion and 9.5 acres (3.8 hectares) of land. When Boston College asked the Archbishop of Boston, Cardinal William Henry O'Connell, for his approval of the purchase, he consented and paid for the estate for the college. The newly acquired building was named Cardinal O'Connell Hall and housed the College of Business Administration from 1941 to 1943. In September 1945, the school opened the Institute of Adult Education at Intown Center, which offered lectures in various courses, for which students did not receive academic credit.

On August 19, 1945, five days after the end of the war in the Pacific, Murphy's six-year term as president came to an end, in accordance with Jesuit custom. He was succeeded by William L. Keleher as president, and Thomas M. Herlihy as pastor of St. Ignatius Loyola Church.

== Later years ==
In 1946, Murphy was appointed the dean of studies at the Shadowbrook novitiate in Lenox, Massachusetts. He then left in 1952 to become the instructor of tertians at St. Robert Bellarmine Hall in Pomfret, Connecticut, the tertianship center for the Jesuit province of New England.

Murphy died on April 28, 1973, at Bon Secours Hospital in Methuen, Massachusetts. His funeral was held at the Church of St. Ignatius Loyola in Chestnut Hill and he was buried at the Weston College cemetery.

Academic offices
| Preceded by William J. McGarry | 19th President of Boston College; 1939–1945 | Succeeded by William L. Keleher |
Catholic Church titles
| Preceded by William J. McGarry | 4th Pastor of the Church of St. Ignatius Loyola; 1939–1941 | Succeeded by Thomas M. Herlihy |
