= William L. Keleher =

American Jesuit academic administrator (1906–1975)

The Reverend William L. Keleher SJ
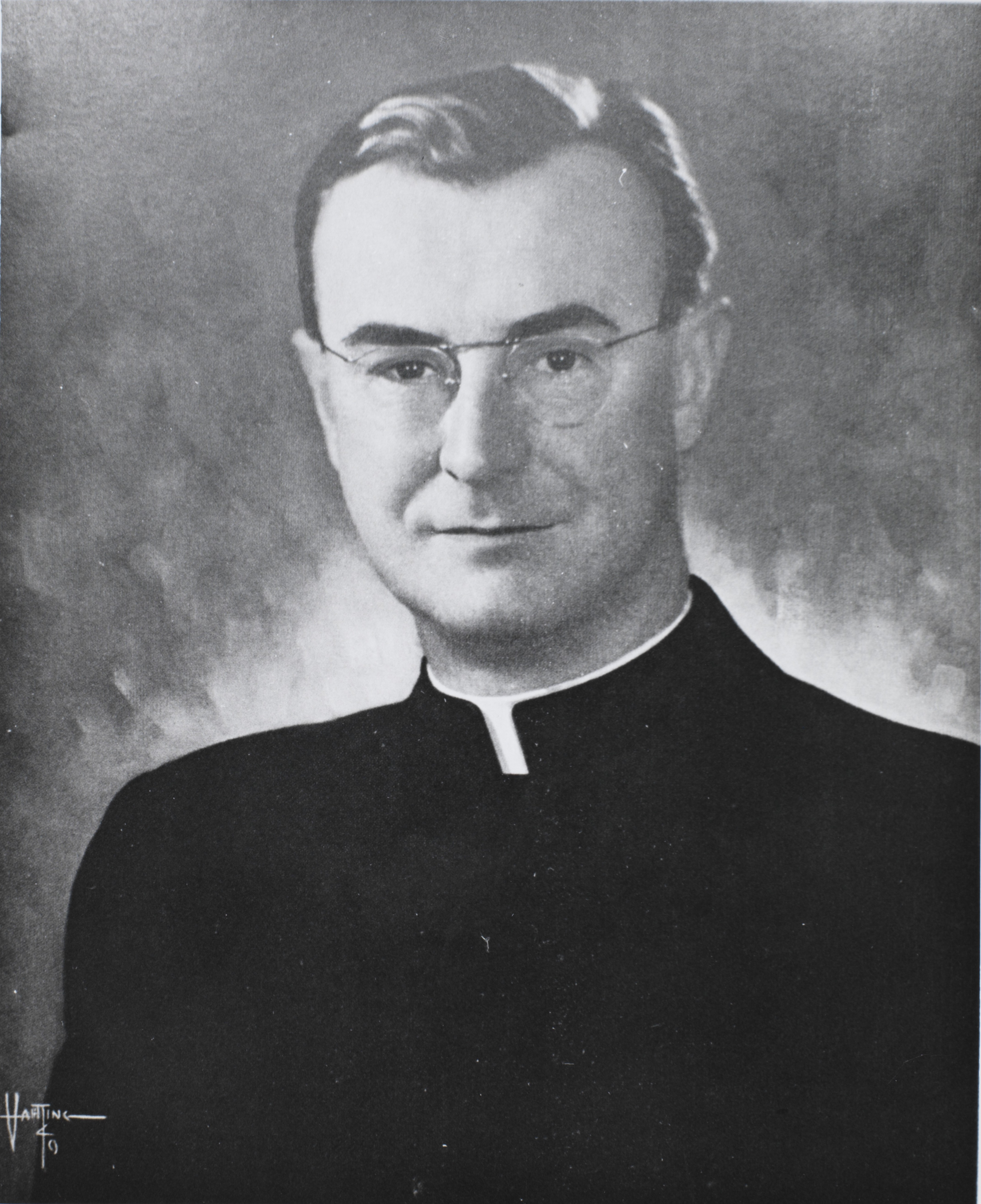
- Keleher c. 1951

20th President of Boston College
- In office 1945–1951
- Preceded by: William J. Murphy
- Succeeded by: Joseph R. N. Maxwell

Personal details
- Born: William Lane Keleher; January 27, 1906 Woburn, Massachusetts, U.S.
- Died: October 27, 1975 (aged 69) Boston, Massachusetts, U.S.
- Education: College of the Holy Cross (BA)

Orders
- Ordination: June 1937

William Lane Keleher SJ (January 27, 1906 – October 27, 1975) was an American Catholic priest and Jesuit who was the president of Boston College from 1945 to 1951. During his tenure, the school oversaw rapid and significant growth in the number of students returning from World War II under the G.I. Bill. In the span of five years, enrollment increased from approximately 200 students to over 7,500.

To accommodate this growth, Keleher oversaw construction of three permanent buildings, including Fulton Hall, for the School of Management, and Lyons Hall. He also relocated several military structures onto the campus for use as student housing. While meant to be temporary, the structures remained for almost 20 years. In 1946, Boston College's School of Nursing was established, and in 1948, the college's ROTC program was created.

== Early life ==
Keleher was born on January 27, 1906, in Woburn, Massachusetts. He studied at Boston College High School and then at the College of the Holy Cross. Keleher entered the Society of Jesus in 1926.

He was ordained a priest in June 1937. He then became the assistant to the Jesuit provincial superior. On November 1, 1942, he was made the province's master of novices.

== Boston College ==
On August 19, 1945, Keleher succeeded William J. Murphy as the 20th president of Boston College. The start of his presidency coincided with the end of World War II, and Boston College saw a large increase in student enrollment under the G.I. Bill. While only 236 students were enrolled in April 1944, in September 1945, 453 students enrolled. In the fall of 1946, enrollment had increased further to 2,811 in the just the College of Arts & Sciences and the School of Business Administration, setting a new record for Boston College. By 1947, those two schools enrolled 4,572 students. Similarly, the Law School, which graduated only 6 students in 1945, enrolled 250 students in the fall of that year. The total number of students reached 7,526 in 1949.

In order to transition veterans into academia, courses were created to allow returning students to review coursework they studied before the war, a special advisor was appointed to attend to the veterans, and credit was given for courses taken while in the military. To accommodate the enlarged student body, Boston College also hired new faculty members, with an increase in the number of lay professors. Faculty salaries increased and a retirement plan was established.

In light of this rapidly growing student body, the physical facilities of the school became overcrowded. During this time, the Federal Public Housing Authority was permitted to donate surplus federal structures to colleges to accommodate the returning veterans. In July 1946, the college acquired three army barracks from Fort Devens Air Base and erected them as dormitories on campus. It also relocated one building from the South Boston Navy Yard to use as classroom space, and a second building from Gallups Island in Boston Harbor to use as a multipurpose building, authorized by Keleher the following spring. In 1948, Boston College sought to take ownership of the barracks under a new federal law. The city of Newton opposed this plan because the structures did not comply with the municipal building code. Keleher wrote a letter to the city's aldermen, assuring them that the college intended to replace the barracks with permanent dormitories as soon as possible, and the city eventually approved the plan. However, the temporary structures remained on campus for almost 20 years.

In January 1946, Keleher began a fundraising campaign to build three new permanent buildings. In June 1947, construction began on Fulton Hall, which would house the School of Management, and was completed the following year. A service building was also constructed from 1947 to 1948. From May 1950 to July 1951, Lyons Hall was constructed, which housed a cafeteria and classrooms.

In 1946, the School of Nursing was established, which enrolled Boston College's first female undergraduate students. In 1947, the drama program was enlarged into the new School of Dramatic and Expressional Arts. The college's football, basketball, and ice hockey teams also resumed intercollegiate competition. Keleher was also involved in early discussions to create the School of Education. In 1948, Keleher oversaw the creation of the college's Reserve Officers' Training Corps (ROTC) program.

On June 29, 1951, Keleher was succeeded by Joseph R. N. Maxwell as president of the college.

=== The Feeneyism controversy ===
In 1943, Leonard Feeney, a Jesuit, became the spiritual director of the St. Benedict Center, which drew many students from Harvard University and Radcliffe College and spurred many conversions to Catholicism. There, Feeney preached a strict interpretation of the Catholic doctrine extra Ecclesiam nulla salus: that there is no salvation outside the Catholic Church. In 1948, the Jesuit provincial superior transferred Feeney to the College of the Holy Cross, but Feeney refused to go. Three teachers of philosophy and physics at Boston College and one teacher at Boston College High School were adherents of Feeney's view and advocated it in their classes and outside of class.

In 1948, the teachers were interrogated about their beliefs by the Boston College administration, as a former provincial superior hid behind a tapestry and recorded their answers with a notary public. The college administration ordered the three teachers not to teach Feeney's view. In January 1949, they wrote a letter to Keleher stating that heresy was being taught at Boston College. They then wrote letters to the Jesuit Superior General, Jean-Baptiste Janssens, and Pope Pius XII. Keleher fired the three teachers, and the high school teacher was also fired. Keleher stated that they had continued to advocate views "contrary to the traditional teachings of the Catholic Church", which led to "bigotry and intolerance". Feeney publicly and strongly came to the defense of the teachers, leading to the archbishop of Boston, Cardinal Richard Cushing, removing Feeney's priestly faculties and prohibiting Catholics from visiting the St. Benedict Center. Eventually, Feeney was expelled from the Society of Jesus and he was excommunicated by Pope Pius XII. Feeney's excommunication was lifted in 1974.

== Later years ==
After his presidency of Boston College, Keleher was a professor, administrator, and trustee at the College of the Holy Cross. He also worked at Campion Hall, the Jesuit retreat center in North Andover, Massachusetts. Keleher died on October 27, 1975, at St. Elizabeth's Hospital in Boston. Three brothers and one sister were alive at the time of his death.

Academic offices
Preceded by William J. Murphy	20th President of Boston College; 1945–1951	Succeeded by Joseph R. N. Maxwell
