= CSOM =

CSOM may refer to:

- Chronic suppurative otitis media
- Carlson School of Management
- Carroll School of Management
- Colorado School of Mines
- Client-side object model, a component of Microsoft's SharePoint platform
- Center for Sex Offender Management
