= Michael P. Walsh (Jesuit) =

American Jesuit priest (1912–1982)

The Reverend Michael P. Walsh SJ
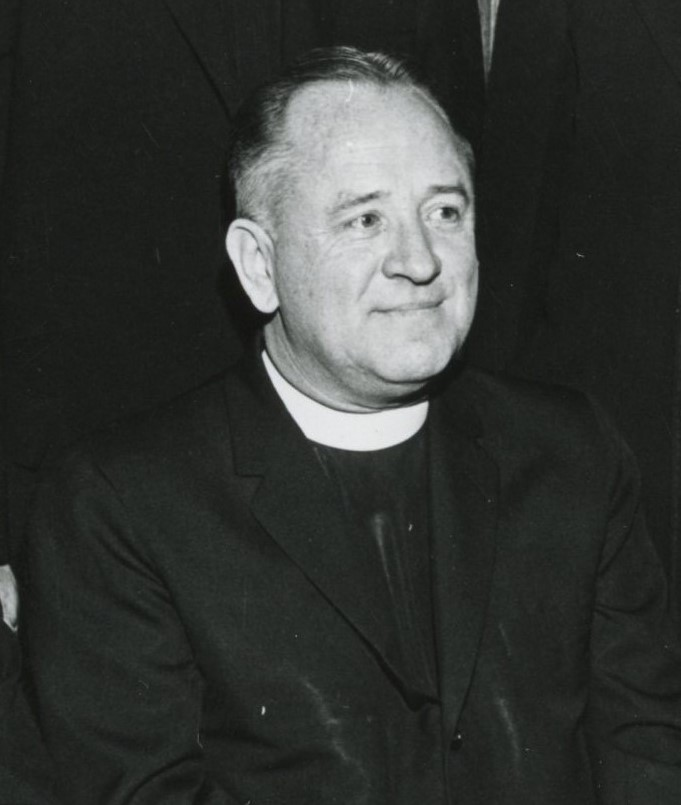
- Walsh c. 1964

29th President of Fordham University
- In office 1969–1972
- Preceded by: Leo P. McLaughlin
- Succeeded by: James C. Finlay

22nd President of Boston College
- In office 1958–1968
- Preceded by: Joseph R. N. Maxwell
- Succeeded by: W. Seavey Joyce

Personal details
- Born: February 28, 1912 Boston, Massachusetts, U.S.
- Died: April 23, 1982 (aged 70) Boston, Massachusetts, U.S.
- Education: Shadowbrook Novitiate; Boston College (BA, MA); Weston College (STL); Fordham University (MS, PhD)

Orders
- Ordination: 1941

Michael Patrick Walsh SJ (February 28, 1912 – April 23, 1982) was an American Catholic priest, Jesuit, and biologist. Born in Boston, Massachusetts, he entered the Society of Jesus in 1929, was ordained a priest in 1941, and received his doctorate in biology from Fordham University in 1948. Walsh became a professor and later chairman of the department of biology at Boston College.

In 1958, Walsh was appointed the president of Boston College. He oversaw the construction of 15 new buildings, the creation of many new doctoral programs, and the overhaul of the undergraduate curriculum. He also reduced the requirements of students to attend daily Mass and annual retreats.

In 1969, Walsh left Boston College to become the president of Fordham University. He significantly improved the school's distressed finances and increased enrollment. He oversaw a period of significant campus turmoil, in part related to the Vietnam War. Walsh returned to Boston in 1972, where he spent his final years.

== Early life ==
Walsh was born on February 28, 1912, in South Boston, Massachusetts, to Coleman and Bridgette (née McDonough) Walsh. He had five brothers and two sisters. As a child, he was educated at the Boston Public Schools, including the Bigelow School. He then attended Boston College High School, where he graduated in June 1929. Later that year, he entered the Society of Jesus in Lenox, Massachusetts.

=== Education ===
Walsh began his Jesuit formation at the Shadowbrook Novitiate, from which he graduated in 1933. In 1934 and 1935, he received his Bachelor of Arts and Master of Arts, respectively, from Boston College. In 1938, Walsh received a Master of Science from Fordham University. He was ordained a priest at Weston College in 1941. The following year, he received his Licentiate in Sacred Theology from Weston College.

In 1942, Walsh became the first principal of the newly established Fairfield College Preparatory School. The following year, he became an instructor at Boston College. In 1948, Walsh received his Doctorate of Philosophy in biology from Fordham University.

That same year, he became the chairman of the department of biology at Boston College, a position he would hold for 10 years. His research focused on cytology and genetics, and he became prominent in several professional biology organizations. During this time, he also the chaplain to the Catholic clubs at Harvard, Tufts, and Boston University medical schools. He was also a member of the American Society for the Advancement of Science, the American Association of Zoologists, the Botanical Society of America, the American Microscopical Society.

== Boston College ==
Walsh was appointed the rector of Boston College by the Jesuit Superior General, Jean-Baptiste Janssens, and the following day, was elected the school's president by its board of trustees. He assumed both offices on February 5, 1958.

A debate over whether to rename Boston College to reflect its status as a university, which began in 1953 under Walsh's predecessor, Joseph R. N. Maxwell, continued during Walsh's presidency. Soon after taking office, Walsh convened a committee to consider the issue. The committee unanimously agreed that the school's name should be changed, but could not agree on what it should be changed to. Boston College alumni opposed the name change and, by 1963, so did students. Walsh took no further action on renaming the school.

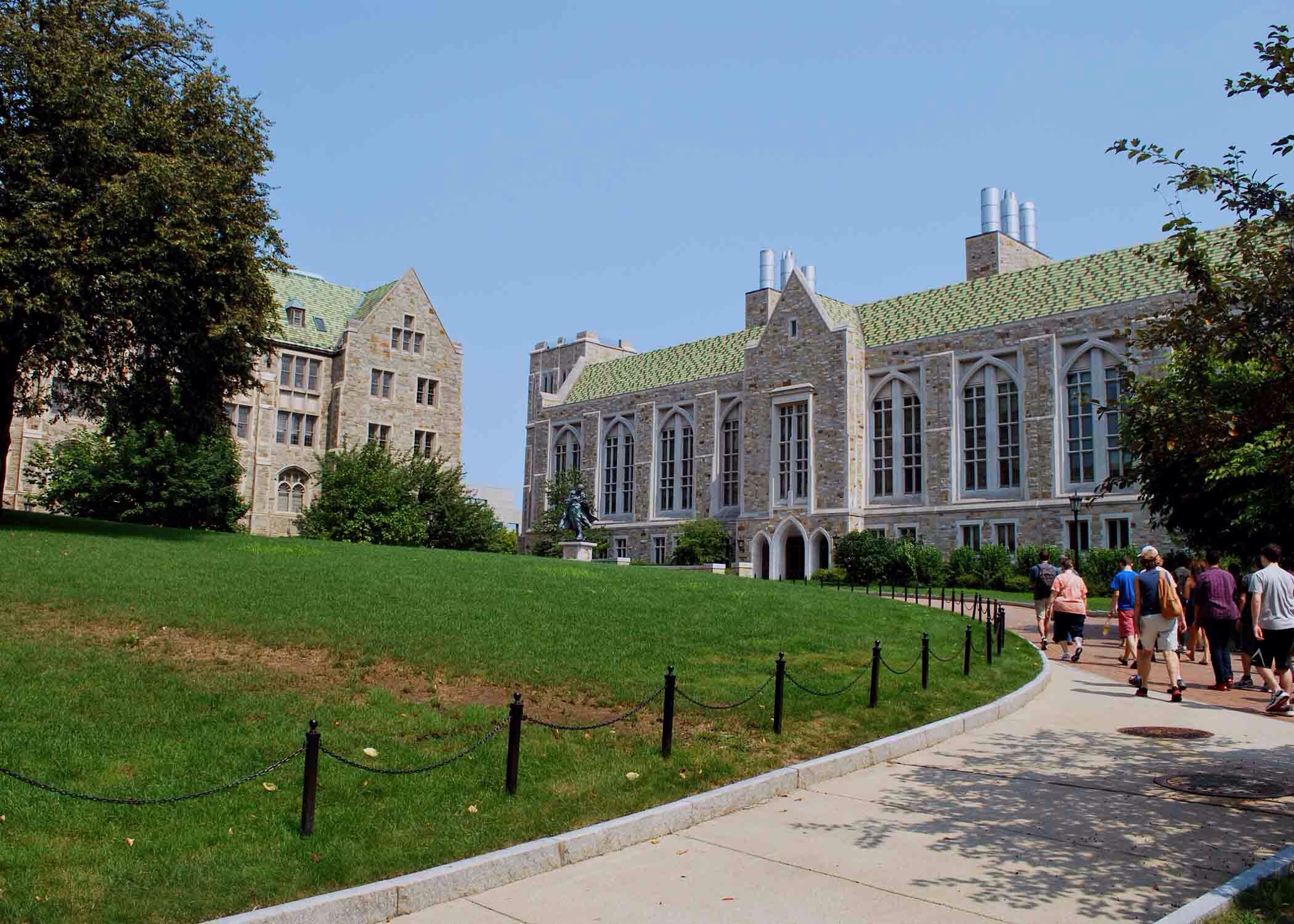
Higgins Hall (right) opened in 1966.

During Walsh's presidency, a number of buildings were constructed, including: the Roberts Center, a gymnasium, in 1958; McElroy Commons, a new dining hall, in 1961; and Carney Hall, a faculty office building, in 1964. Welch, Williams, and Roncalli Halls, student dormitories, were completed in 1965. McGuinn Hall, a social science building, was also built and opened in September 1968. Boston College's science programs grew during Walsh's tenure. In the early 1960s, Boston College began granting doctorates in chemistry, physics, and biology. Higgins Hall, a new building for the biology and physics departments, opened in 1966. In total, Walsh oversaw the construction of 15 new buildings. Doctoral degrees were also awarded for the first time in philosophy, modern languages, psychology, Germanic studies, and English.

In 1960, Walsh created a board of regents, an institution that other Jesuit universities had also created, which advised the president on long-term planning and capital development. The undergraduate curriculum was also revised, with a reduction in the size of the core curriculum and the overall number of credits required. Boston College also celebrated its centennial in 1963. In 1968, Walsh drew up plans for the creation of an academic senate. He also supported the incorporation of the Jesuit community at Boston College as a separate legal entity from the university.

In 1968, Walsh established a scholarship fund to draw black students to BC. While there were some demonstrations and debates on campus about the Vietnam War, they were relatively muted, and students' views on the war were split. During Walsh's presidency, the requirement that students living in the dormitories attend daily Mass was reduced to twice per week, and was later abolished. The requirement that students attend an annual retreat was reduced to twice during their four years.

Walsh was involved in the creation of the Association of Independent Colleges and Universities in Massachusetts and was the president of the college and university department of the National Catholic Educational Association. Over the course of his presidency, the size of the faculty doubled. On January 25, 1968, Walsh submitted his resignation, effective June 30, 1968, to the board of trustees. He was succeeded by W. Seavey Joyce.

== Fordham University ==
Walsh became the president of Fordham University in January 1969. When he assumed office, Fordham was in the midst of a financial crisis. Over the course of his three years as president, Walsh balanced the university's budget, starting with a deficit and ending with a surplus. Student enrollment also increased from 10,000 to 14,000.

In 1969, during the Moratorium to End the War in Vietnam, Walsh signed a letter in opposition to the war. On November 12 of that year, members of Students for a Democratic Society took over and occupied Walsh's office, injured a security guard, and overturned a car. Five students were later convicted of crimes.

In March 1969, the department of English denied tenure to a young, controversial professor known for his sarcastic, biting criticisms. Hundreds of students signed a petition demanding that he be granted tenure. Students again broke into and occupied Walsh's office for two days, telling people who called the office's phone that Walsh and other senior administration had been fired. Walsh offered to allow a committee of faculty and students to review the case, but students still went on strike for days and held anti-war rallies, forcing the cancellation of classes. In 1970, following the Kent State shootings, someone set the campus center on fire.

In 1971, Walsh informed the board of directors that he was unwell, had a heart condition, and wanted to return to Boston.

== Later years ==
At the end of his presidency of Fordham, Walsh moved to Boston College High School in Boston, where he was appointed a member of its board of trustees. He was also an academic advisor to the president of the University of Massachusetts. He was also a member of the Commission on Presidential Scholars and the Marshall Scholarship Committee and a trustee of the John F. Kennedy Presidential Library.

At various times, Walsh was the chairman of the boards of trustees of Georgetown University and the University of Detroit, and was a trustee of Boston College, Fordham University, Harriman College in New York, Emmanuel College, St. Joseph’s Seminary and College, Loyola University New Orleans, Canisius College, Marymount Manhattan College, Saint Joseph’s University and Saint John’s Seminary.

Walsh died on April 23, 1982, at the Jesuit residence at Boston College High School. His funeral was held at the Church of St. Ignatius Loyola at Boston College. He was buried at the Jesuit cemetery at Campion Center in Weston, Massachusetts. A later Boston College president, J. Donald Monan, described Walsh as the founder of modern Boston College.

== Legacy ==
Walsh received honorary degrees from: the University of Massachusetts in 1961, Villanova University in 1961, the College of the Holy Cross in 1962, Northeastern University in 1962, Suffolk University in 1963, Saint Anselm College in 1963, Brandeis University in 1963, Stonehill College in 1964, Norwich University in 1967, Loyola University Chicago, in 1967, Xavier University in 1968, Canisius College in 1969, Walsh College in 1971, Creighton University in 1973, Fordham University in 1974, Boston College in 1975, and Marymount Manhattan College in 1979.

Walsh Hall, a student residence at Boston College that opened on October 2, 1982, was named in his honor. In 1990, the Michael P. Walsh, S.J., Chair in Bioethics was endowed at BC.

Academic offices
Preceded by Joseph R. N. Maxwell	22nd President of Boston College; 1958–1968	Succeeded by W. Seavey Joyce
Preceded by Leo P. McLaughlin	29th President of Fordham University; 1969–1972	Succeeded by James C. Finlay
