= Andrew C. Boynton =

American academic administrator (born c.1957)

- Born: c. 1957
- Education: Boston College; UNC Kenan–Flagler Business School
- Occupation: Academic
- Employer: Boston College
- Known for: dean of the Carroll School of Management

Andrew C. Boynton (born c. 1957) is an American academic administrator. He is the John and Linda Powers Family Dean of the Carroll School of Management at Boston College, and the co-author of three books.

== Early life ==
Andrew C. Boynton was born circa 1957. He graduated from Boston College, and earned a master in business administration and a PhD from the Kenan–Flagler Business School at the University of North Carolina at Chapel Hill.

== Career ==
Boynton began his career as an assistant professor at the University of Virginia Darden School of Business, where he taught from 1987 to 1992. He taught at the International Institute for Management Development (IMD) from 1992 to 1994, and he was a tenured associate professor at the UNC Kenan–Flagler Business School from 1994 to 1996. He was a professor of Strategy at IMD from 1996 to 2004.

Boynton is the John and Linda Powers Family Dean at Boston College's Carroll School of Management. He is the co-author of three books.

== Works ==
- Victor, Bart; Boynton, Andrew C. (1998). Invented Here: Maximizing Your Organization's Internal Growth and Profitability. Boston, Massachusetts: Harvard Business School Press. ISBN 9780875847986. OCLC 885173167.
- Boynton, Andrew C.; Fischer, Bill (2005). Virtuoso Teams: Lessons from Teams that Changed their Worlds. Upper Saddle River, New Jersey: Prentice Hall. ISBN 9780273702184. OCLC 758155586.
- Boynton, Andrew C.; Fischer, Bill; Bole, William (2011). The Idea Hunter: How to Find the Best Ideas and Make them Happen. San Francisco, California: Jossey-Bass. ISBN 9780470767764. OCLC 934076191.
