= National Leadership Roundtable on Church Management =

American non-profit organization

Leadership Roundtable (formerly known as the National Leadership Roundtable on Church Management) is a lay-led group born in the midst of the Catholic clergy's sex abuse scandal and dedicated to bringing better administrative practices to dioceses and parishes nationwide.

== Mission ==
In partnership with lay, ordained, and religious leaders and organizations across all sectors of the Catholic community in the United States and Rome, Leadership Roundtable seeks to elevate and implement best practices in management and leadership to establish a culture of co-responsible, servant leadership for a healthy, thriving Church in the U.S.

Leadership Roundtable is an organization of laity, religious, and clergy working together to promote best practices and accountability in the management, finances, communications, and human resource development of the Catholic Church in the U.S., including greater incorporation of the expertise of the laity.

Leadership Roundtable is a Catholic 501(c)(3) nonprofit organization that brings together leaders from the worlds of business, finance, academia, philanthropy, nonprofit organizations, and the Church, to serve the Catholic Church.

Leadership Roundtable serves the Church through its programs, collection of best practices, and consultancy services, which have assisted archdioceses, dioceses, and religious communities across the country.

== Early years and formation ==
In 2002, Geoff Boisi, Rev. J. Donald Monan, S.J., and others consulted with Catholic leaders across the country to make a positive contribution to a Church embroiled in crisis. This led to "The Church in America" convening in 2004, where leaders from business, finance, academia, philanthropy, and the Church came together to discuss and learn.

National Leadership Roundtable on Church Management in incorporated as a 501(c)(3) nonprofit organization in 2005.

National Leadership Roundtable on Church Management formally became Leadership Roundtable in 2016.

== Convenings ==
In June 2009, Leadership Roundtable partners met at the Wharton School of Business and drew a dozen bishops. Former Prime Minister of the United Kingdom and recent Catholic convert Tony Blair addressed them, according to a 2009 report.

In 2010, Catholic leaders convened at "From Aspirations to Action: Solutions for America's Catholic Schools" at Georgetown University.

In 2011, the first Regional Roundtable on Church Management, Finances, and Human Resources convened in San Francisco, CA.

In 2015, in conjunction with FADICA, Mexican American Catholic College, and the University of the Incarnate Word, Leadership Roundtable convened the National Symposium on Hispanic Leadership and Philanthropy for a 21st Century Church.

Leadership Roundtable convened and incubated the Drexel Fund to seed new school models in 2015.

In 2018, Leadership Roundtable convened top Church leaders in wake of the PA grand jury report. This convening brought co-responsibility, accountability, and transparency into the global conversation around Church leadership.

In 2019, Leadership Roundtable convened its first annual Catholic Partnership Summit. Leadership Roundtable created the Catholic Partnership Summit to convene Catholic leaders to address the most pressing challenges and opportunities facing the Church. This first Summit addressed the twin crises of abuse and leadership failures in response to abuse. More than 200 leaders gathered in Washington, D.C. for the inaugural Summit to directly address the twin crises, and together identified best practices in accountability and co-responsibility as well as best practices for responding to sexual abuse. At this convening, Leadership Roundtable also awarded the first J. Donald Monan, SJ Distinguished Catholic Philanthropy Medal.

The 2020 Catholic Partnership Summit centered around the theme of "We are the Body of Christ: Creating a Culture of Co-responsible Leadership."

During the 2020 COVID-19 pandemic, Leadership Roundtable convened leaders online in response to the pandemic.

The 2021 Catholic Partnership Summit was hosted virtually, with a special group gathering in Rome for this convening.

In 2022, Leadership Roundtable began convening leaders of 40+ organizations in regular Catholic Leaders Circle gatherings. This group continues to come together to discuss and learn about synodal leadership.

The 2022 Catholic Partnership Summit was hosted in September in Washington, D.C., its first in-person Summit since the pandemic.

The 2024 Catholic Partnership Summit was the fifth Catholic Partnership Summit and centered around the theme of young adult leadership. It was held in Arlington, VA at the Crystal Gateway Marriott hotel from February 28 to March 1, 2024.

In December 2024, Leadership Roundtable convened Catholic leaders from across the country for its Building Bridges National Gathering in Chicago. Thanks to the support of Lilly Endowment, lay, religious, and ordained leaders from diverse backgrounds had the opportunity to engage in synodal conversations with one another.

All Leadership Roundtable Summit Reports are available as a resource to the public on their website.

== Notable work and recognition ==
Catholic Standards for Excellence for Parishes, Dioceses, and nonprofits was published in 2007. "Catholic Standards for Excellence is a comprehensive set of managerial best practices that help pastors, pastoral and finance council members, and other Church leaders to lead and manage their parishes more effectively."

In 2009, Leadership Roundtable hosted the first Toolbox for Pastoral Management, a program designed to help priests and pastoral leaders to build their competencies and bolster their confidence to lead. The corresponding books A Pastor's Toolbox and A Pastor's Toolbox 2 were published by Liturgical Press in 2014 and 2017 respectively.

In 2023, Leadership Roundtable launched The Catholic Leaders Podcast, a monthly podcast hosted by Kim Smolik and Kerry Robinson that features conversations with "inspirational leaders to talk about their leadership and how faith informs it." The second season of The Catholic Leaders Podcast launched in 2024 as a partnership between Leadership Roundtable and Catholic Charities USA.

In 2022, Leadership Roundtable make a public commitment to fully bilingual communications with support from Crimsonbridge Foundation. In 2023, Leadership Roundtable hired a bilingual communications manager and launched a fully-bilingual website.

== Leadership ==
Kerry Robinson and Michael Brough have been a part of Leadership Roundtable from its start, with Robinson serving as executive director and Brough serving as Director of Strategic Engagement.

In 2014, Kerry Robinson addressed an international meeting of treasurers of religious communities at the Vatican.

In 2017, Kim Smolik assumed the role of CEO of Leadership Roundtable. Michael Brough because deputy director, and Kerry Robinson became Global Ambassador.

To better model a synodal, co-responsible Church, Leadership Roundtable established a partnership model of executive leadership in 2020.

In 2023, long-time executive of Leadership Roundtable, Kerry Robinson, became CEO and President of Catholic Charities USA and assumed a seat on Leadership Roundtable's board of directors.

In May 2024, Leadership Roundtable announced that Kathleen Porter-Magee would replace Patrick Markey as Managing Partner of the organization beginning in August 2024.

Currently, Leadership Roundtable is managed by executive partner Kathleen Quirk and managing partner Kathleen Porter-Magee. Leadership Roundtable is overseen by a board of directors.
