= American Plastics =

Holding company

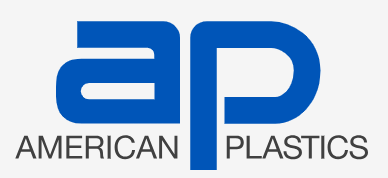
- Formerly: Katy Industries, Inc.
- Type: Holding company
- Founded: 1967
- Founder: Wallace E. Carroll
- Owner: Private

American Plastics, formerly Katy Industries, Inc., is a holding company for a group of businesses which produce and distribute maintenance products and electrical products.

== History ==
The company was organized as a Delaware corporation in 1967, although some of its predecessor companies have been established for over 80 years. That includes its namesake, the Missouri–Kansas–Texas Railroad, a regional carrier which Katy Industries sold to Union Pacific Corporation in 1988.

The founder of the holding company was industrialist Wallace E. Carroll. Members of the board of directors in 2013 were CEO David J. Feldman, Wallace E. Carroll, Jr., Daniel B. Carroll, and four members of private equity firm Kohlberg & Company: chairman William F. Andrews, Christopher W. Anderson, Samuel P. Freider, and Shant Mardirossian.

The company filed for Chapter 11 bankruptcy in 2017. It was bought out later that year by Highview Capital LLC and Victory Park Capital Advisors LLC, and renamed American Plastics. They merged the company with Plastic Concepts and Centrex Plastics, before selling it to an undisclosed buyer in July 2022.
