= Joseph R. N. Maxwell =

American Catholic priest and poet

The Very Reverend Joseph R. N. Maxwell SJ

21st President of Boston College
- In office 1951–1958
- Preceded by: William L. Keleher
- Succeeded by: Michael P. Walsh

20th President of the College of the Holy Cross
- In office 12 September 1939 – 1945
- Preceded by: Francis J. Dolan
- Succeeded by: William J. Healy

Personal details
- Born: 7 November 1899 Taunton, Massachusetts, U.S.
- Died: 18 September 1971 (age 71) Ybbs an der Donau, Austria
- Resting place: Weston College Cemetery
- Education: College of the Holy Cross (BA); Boston College (MA); Fordham University (PhD); Weston College (STL)

Joseph Raymond Nonnatus Maxwell SJ (7 November 1899 – 18 September 1971) was an American Catholic priest, academic, poet, and college administrator. A Jesuit since 1919, he served as President of the College of the Holy Cross from 1939 to 1945, and President of Boston College from 1951 to 1958.

== Early life and education ==
Maxwell was born in Taunton, Massachusetts, United States, on 7 November 1899, to Richard Everett Maxwell and Caroline A. Carpenter.

He attended Taunton public schools, including Taunton High School, before entering the College of the Holy Cross in 1918. After a year, he entered the Society of Jesus on 8 September 1919, taking the religious name Nonnatus. After graduating in 1921, he studied the classics at St. Andrew-on-Hudson Novitiate for two years. He then went to Boston College, graduating in 1926 with a Master of Arts, and from 1926 to 1929 held a teaching position at the College of the Holy Cross. He then attended Fordham University, where he earned his Doctor of Philosophy in 1930. He went on to study philosophy at Weston College, graduating in 1933 with a Licentiate of Sacred Theology.

== Priesthood and academic career ==
Maxwell was ordained to the priesthood in 1932. In 1935, he was appointed Dean at Boston College, where he served until 1939. On 12 September 1939, he was appointed President of the College of the Holy Cross by Rev. James S. Dolan, SJ, the Provincial of the New England Province of the Society of Jesus. At 39, he was the youngest person appointed to the position at the time. His presidency took place during the difficult years during World War II, when the number of students decreased due to military conscription, and his leadership style has been described as conservative. In 1939, Wheeler Hall was dedicated, despite decreasing enrollment, which dropped by 70 in his first academic year as president.

In addition to this issue, Maxwell also worked to revamp Holy Cross academically. In November 1938, the Association of American Universities sent evaluators to the college and later prepared a report as part of the accreditation process. While accreditation was unhesitatingly granted, Maxwell described the report as "far from flattering." Not a single Jesuit faculty member held a PhD, and the report described the general credentials of the faculty as subpar for "an institution of the standing of Holy Cross." The accreditors recommended that faculty members pursue further studies "in leading graduate and professional institutions, including at least some not connected with the Catholic Church." Maxwell was proactive upon hearing this, and less than a month after taking office, he was preparing for the implementation of the recommendations. He also took a more active role than his predecessors in managing the Holy Cross athletic program, despite an apparent lack of interest in athletics. He made clear his athletic policies in the fall of 1941, when he limited the number and size of athletic scholarships, and asserted that the college needed "to keep our standards where they belong," even at the risk of less successful sports teams.

In 1945, he left the presidency of Holy Cross and became Rector of Cranwell Preparatory School in Lenox, Massachusetts.

Six years later, in 1951, Maxwell was appointed President of Boston College. As president, he struggled with a drop in enrollment caused by the Korean War, but also made improvements to the school's administration, including the development of faculty norms for promotion. In addition, the university's intellectual and cultural esteem increased as a result of bringing in respected lecturers and professors, including many from outside traditional Catholic circles. Some of those invited to lecture during Maxwell's presidency included Adlai Stevenson II, G. Mennen Williams, Frank Sheed, Robert Frost. During his presidency, Maxwell had a friendly relationship with Rev. Robert Drinan, SJ, who was at that time on the faculty of Boston College Law School. In 1955, Maxwell was invited to the White House, where he met President of the United States Dwight D. Eisenhower.

Notably, it was during Maxwell's presidency that Boston College seriously debated whether or not to change its name to reflect its status as a university. The question of changing the college's name was first raised at a 1953 board of trustees meeting, where a motion was made to empower the president to negotiate a change of the name to 'Boston Catholic University'. Three years later, the name 'Botolph University' was considered. Input from the larger Boston College community flooded in when Maxwell opened the discussion to faculty, alumni, Jesuits, and administrators. The Dean of the School of Business Administration pushed for the name 'Jesuit University of Boston', and others suggested 'St. Robert Bellarmine University' and 'St. Thomas More University'. The debate continued even after Maxwell's presidency ended, only coming to a close in 1963 under the presidency of Rev. Michael P. Walsh, SJ. Maxwell ended his term as President of Boston College in 1958.

== Later life and death ==
In 1960 Maxwell volunteered to serve as a missionary in Jamaica, then part of the short-lived West Indies Federation. He remained there for eleven years, working as a parish priest. He served as pastor of St. Joseph's Church in Falmouth, where he designed and built "a church of his own designing adapted both to the new liturgy and age-old semi-tropical heat of Jamaica." The church was "the first of its kind in the Caribbean," and was built by the Vaccino brothers. After being relieved of missionary duties in 1971, he embarked on a tour of Europe, where he died on 18 September 1971 in Ybbs an der Donau, Austria, at the age of 71. His body was sent back to the United States and was buried at Weston College Cemetery.

== Bibliography ==
Maxwell was an accomplished academic, writing two books, and having been included in such journals as Poetry and The Classical Weekly, The Classical Weekly, and Thought: A Journal of Philosophy. The following is an incomplete list of his works:

- Completed Fragments. Boston: Manthorne & Burack. 1936. (poetry)
- Fifty Golden Years, 1886–1936. Paterson, New Jersey: St. Anthony Guild Press. 1936.
- The Happy Ascetic: Adolph Petit of the Society of Jesus. Benziger Brothers. 1936.
- "New England Indian Summer" (1940)
- "Liberal Education and the Classics" (1950)

== See also ==
- List of Boston College presidents
