= Ronald Logue =

American businessman

Ronald (Ron) E. Logue is the former chairman of the board and CEO of State Street Corporation (NYSE: STT).

== Biography ==
Logue was appointed chairman and chief executive officer in 2004. Prior to that he held a number of leadership positions at State Street. Logue joined the company in 1990 as senior vice president and head of the investment servicing for US mutual funds. He was named chief operating officer in 2000 and president in 2001. As president and chief operating officer, Logue was responsible for overseeing State Street's investment servicing, securities and investment research and trading activities, as well as information technology. During his presidency, he led the highly successful integration of the Deutsche Bank's Global Securities Services business, acquired in January 2003.

In 2008, Logue earned a total compensation of $28,712,475 at State Street. His compensation included a base salary of $1,000,000, stock awards of $13,366,897, and option awards of $6,441,092.

Logue serves on the board of directors of the Federal Reserve Bank of Boston, the Metropolitan Boston Housing Partnership, a nonprofit, low-income housing organization, the United Way of Massachusetts Bay, and The Institute of Contemporary Art. He also serves on the board of overseers of Boston's Museum of Fine Arts. He has served as chairman of the board of directors of State Street Bank Europe Limited and State Street Cayman Trust Company, Ltd. In addition to his business activities, Ron Logue is also a member of the Massachusetts Grand Lodge of Freemasons. Logue's Mother Lodge is Columbian Lodge of the First Masonic District in Massachusetts

On October 22, 2009, it was announced that Logue would retire from State Street on March 1, 2010, after almost two decades with the company and then continue to serve as non-executive chairman of State Street's board of directors for a transition period until January 1, 2011. Upon Logue's retirement on March 1, 2010, State Street president and chief operating officer Joseph "Jay" Hooley was promoted to CEO, retaining his role as president.

A native of Boston, Logue received both his B.S. and M.B.A. from Boston College.

Prior to his elevation to CEO, Logue held a number of other positions at State Street, including senior vice president and head of the investment servicing for U.S. mutual funds, chief operating officer, and president.
