= J. Donald Monan =

American Jesuit priest and 24th president of Boston College

J. Donald Monan, S.J.
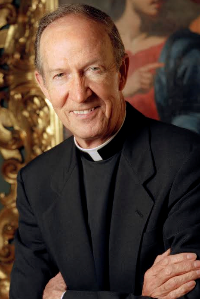

24th President of Boston College
- In office July 31, 1972 – July 30, 1996
- Preceded by: W. Seavey Joyce, S.J.
- Succeeded by: William P. Leahy

Personal details
- Born: December 31, 1924 Blasdell, New York, U.S.
- Died: March 18, 2017 (aged 92)
- Education: Woodstock College; UCLouvain

J. Donald Monan, SJ (December 31, 1924 – March 18, 2017) was the chancellor of Boston College from 1996 to 2017 and its 24th president from 1972 to 1996—the longest such tenure in the university's history until it was surpassed by his successor. A native of Blasdell, New York, he joined the Society of Jesus in 1942. Monan earned a bachelor's degree, a licentiate of philosophy, and a Licentiate of Sacred Theology at Woodstock College. He then studied at the University of Louvain (UCLouvain) in Belgium, where he earned a Ph.D. in philosophy. He was ordained a priest in 1955.

Prior to becoming president of Boston College, Monan served as acting president, vice president, academic dean, chairman of the philosophy department, professor and instructor at Le Moyne College.

== Boston College ==
When Monan took over as president, BC was approximately $30 million in debt and its endowment totaled just under $6 million. By the time he retired, the university's endowment had risen to over $500 million and the campus had greatly expanded to include such new buildings as O’Neill Library, Merkert Chemistry Center and Conte Forum.

Monan served as chancellor of the university after retiring as president. His memberships included the National Leadership Roundtable on Church Management, the Jesuit Philosophical Association, New England Province of Jesuits, the Society for Phenomenology and Existential Philosophy, and the Massachusetts Historical Society.
