= Theological Studies (journal) =

- Discipline: Religious studies
- Language: English
- Edited by: Christopher Steck

Publication details
- History: 1940–present
- Publisher: SAGE Publishing for the Jesuits in the United States (United States)
- Frequency: Quarterly
- Open access: Delayed, after 5 years

Standard abbreviations
- ISO 4: Theol. Stud.

Indexing
- ISSN: 0040-5639
- LCCN: a40002920
- OCLC no.: 556989066

Links
- Journal homepage; Online archive

Theological Studies is a quarterly peer-reviewed academic journal published by the Society of Jesus in the United States covering research on all aspects of theology. The journal is hosted by Georgetown University and was established in 1940. The current editor-in-chief is Christopher Steck (Georgetown University).
