= George Kunhardt Estate =

Historic house in Massachusetts, United States

- U.S. National Register of Historic Places
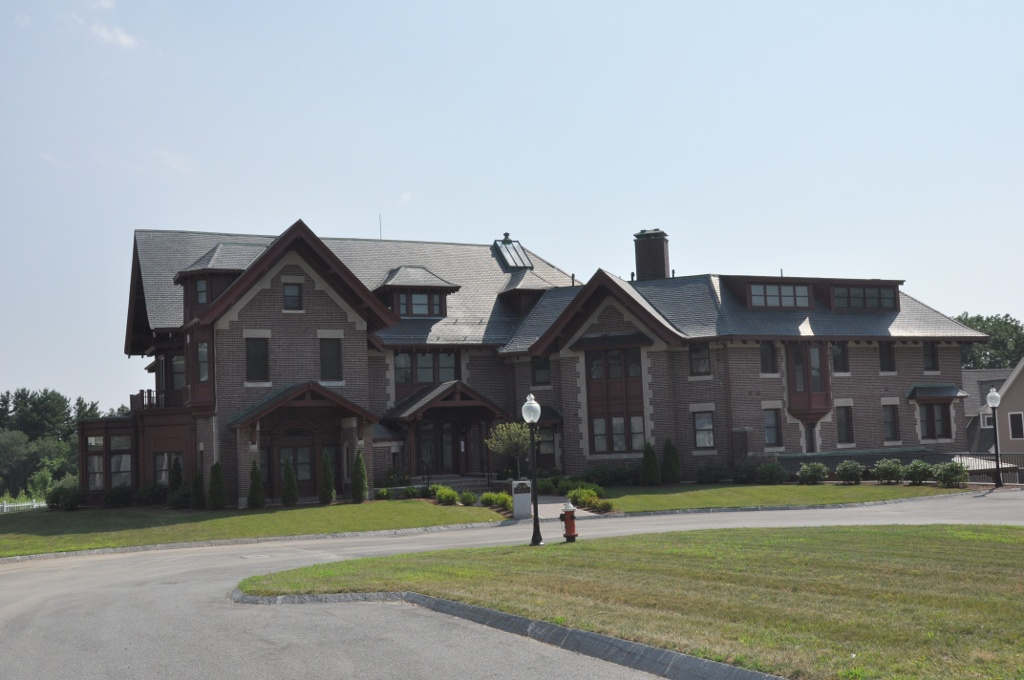
- The estate house in 2012, now condominiums

- Location within Massachusetts Location within the United States
- Nearest city: North Andover, Massachusetts
- Coordinates: 42°42′39″N 71°5′44″W
- Area: 86 acres (35 ha)
- Built: 1906
- Architect: Codman, Stephen
- Architectural style: Queen Anne
- NRHP reference No.: 76000284
- Added to NRHP: April 22, 1976

The George Kunhardt Estate, also historically named Hardtcourt, is a historic estate off Great Pond Road in North Andover, Massachusetts. Built in 1906 for George Kunhardt, a principal owner of textile mills in the Merrimack Valley, the estate later became known as Campion Hall when it served as a Jesuit retreat center. After sitting vacant for many years, the property has been converted into residential condominiums. The property was listed on the National Register of Historic Places on April 22, 1976.

== Description and history ==
The George Kunhardt Estate is located in a rural residential setting in northeastern North Andover, overlooking Lake Cochichewick to the south. Much of the estate's 85 acres (34 ha) have been developed as a residential subdivision, and the estate's main house and carriage house now form part of that development. The main house is a large and somewhat rambling 2 1/2-story Victorian structure, with asymmetrical massing and projecting sections typical of the Queen Anne style. The main block has a steeply pitched roof that is gabled at one end and hipped at the other, with two-story gabled projections giving it a T shape. A two-story wing extends further east along the main block, with an angled section joining it to the main block. The exterior is finished in red brick, with limestone trim elements that include corner quoining and window sills and lintels. In several places, dormers pierce the main roof sections, either with a hip roof or truncated hip roof.

The estate house was designed by Stephen Codman of Boston, a close friend of George Kunhardt, owner of a textile mill complex in Lawrence. Kunhardt sent Codman to Europe to study German architecture, which Kunhardt himself had been exposed to when he traveled there to learn about German textile processing techniques. The house was built in 1906, and was Kunhardts home until his death in 1935. It was acquired by the Jesuits in 1937, and converted by them into a retreat center. A brick dormitory wing was added to one side of the house, and a guest house was attached via a hyphen to the other side. Both of these structures were torn down during conversion of the building to condominiums, a process that occurred after the Jesuits abandoned the property and it stood vacant for many years.

== See also ==
- National Register of Historic Places listings in Essex County, Massachusetts
