= Boston College Carroll School of Management =

Business school of Boston College

Coordinates: 42°20′4.3″N 71°10′11.9″W

- Private business school
- Boston College
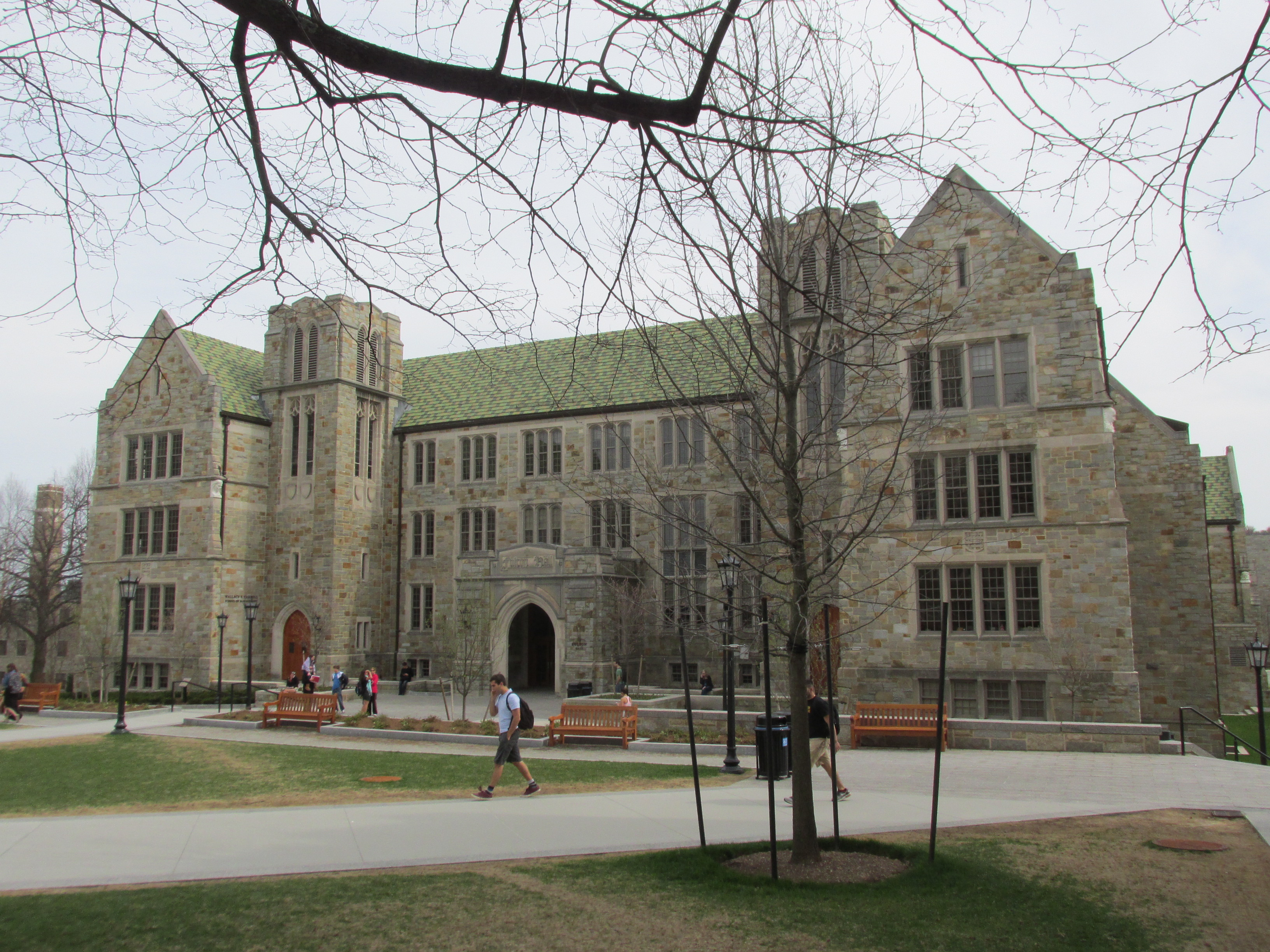
- Fulton Hall

- Logo
- Location: Chestnut Hill, Massachusetts, U.S.
- Full name: Wallace E. Carroll School of Management
- Abbreviation: CSOM
- Motto in English: Through cooperation and integrity we prosper
- Founder: William J. McGarry
- Established: 1938; 88 years ago
- Named for: Wallace E. Carroll
- Former names: College of Business Administration
- Dean: Andrew C. Boynton
- Undergraduates: 2,257
- Postgraduates: 905
- Website: www.bc.edu/bc-web/schools/carroll-school.html

The Boston College Carroll School of Management (CSOM) is the business school of Boston College in Chestnut Hill, Massachusetts.

Established in 1938, the Carroll School offers Bachelor of Science, Master of Business Administration (MBA), and Doctor of Philosophy (Ph.D.) degrees, in addition to Master of Science degrees in both finance and accounting, along with joint degree programs with Boston College's other schools.

== History ==
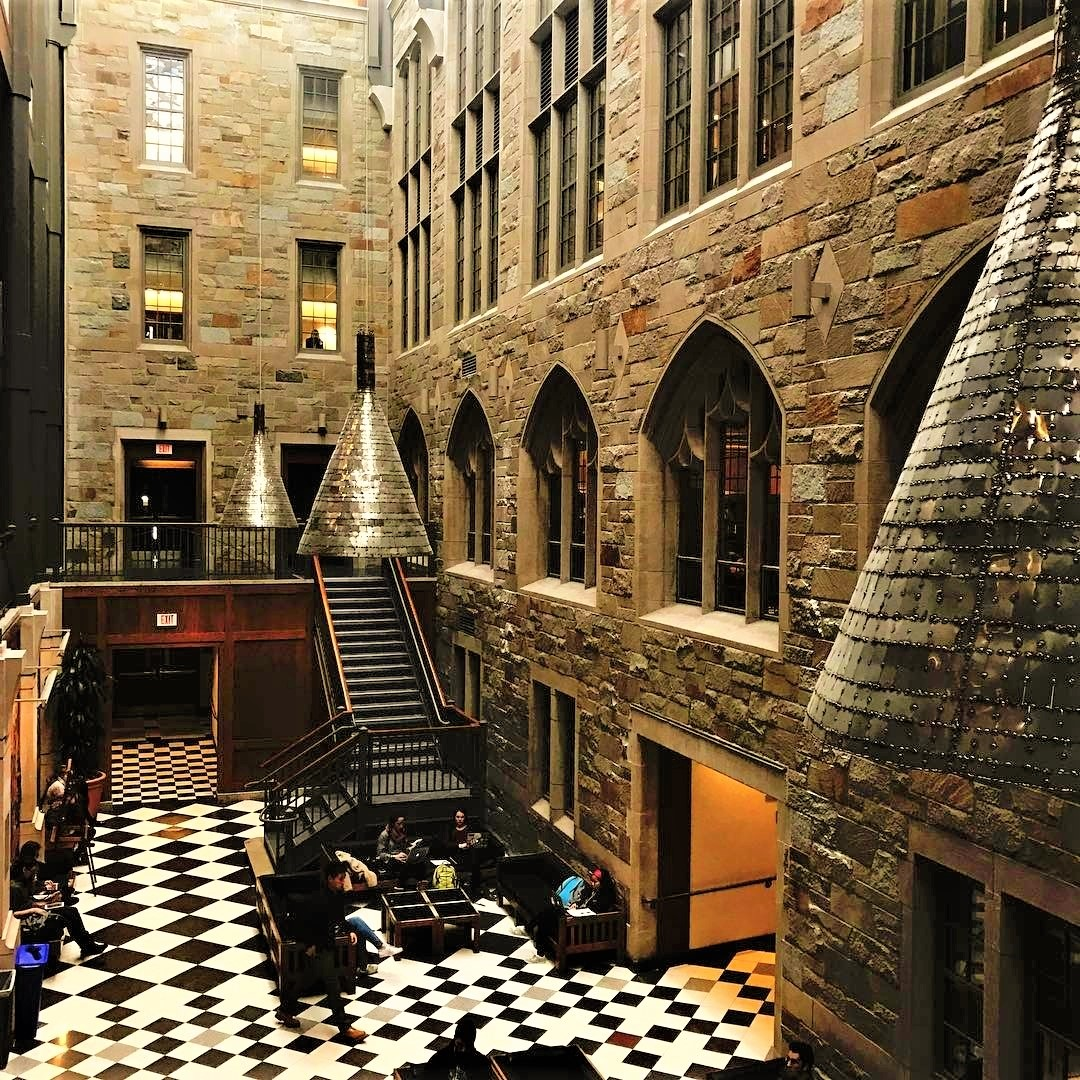
Fulton Hall atrium

In 1938, the Carroll School was founded as the College of Business Administration. At the invitation of Boston College president Father William J. McGarry, S.J., more than 30 prominent businessmen and bankers from Boston and New York City provided counsel to the school as members of an advisory committee. Seventy-two student candidates were selected from over 100 applications to begin study. Classes began on September 16, 1938, in a building, which housed other graduate programs, at 126 Newbury Street in downtown Boston. The business school's enrollment was about 330 by the time 52 students first graduated in June 1942.

CSOM's home, Fulton Hall, is named for Father Robert Fulton, the first dean and twice president of Boston College. It was designed in the late 1940s in the collegiate gothic style by the Boston firm of Maginnis and Walsh. In addition to the James J. Byrnes Library, the building housed an industrial management laboratory in the basement that was considered innovative in the era of the "efficiency expert" and time-and-motion studies. In 1993, Fulton Hall underwent a major renovation by Svigals & Associates, a New Haven, Connecticut-based firm.

The school was renamed in 1989 in honor of industrialist and alumnus Wallace E. Carroll of Katy Industries, whose $10 million donation was the largest private grant to the university at the time.

== Undergraduate program ==
=== Admissions ===
Prospective Carroll School students apply directly to the school during their senior year of high school, either through the Early Decision (ED I or ED II) or Regular Decision process. The acceptance rate for the CSOM was 25% for the Class of 2012, and the total of undergraduate business applicants was 6,729. 28% of admitted CSOM applicants chose to enroll in the school.

=== Academics ===
Business school rankings

United States
- Bloomberg MBA: 47
- USNWR MBA: 43

Global
- Financial Times MBA: 55

The Carroll School's undergraduate program offers a balance of both a liberal arts education and a general management curriculum. In addition to coursework for a student's declared concentration, undergraduates are expected to fulfill the university's core curriculum and CSOM's curriculum in general management, which encompasses courses in accounting, finance, operations management, marketing, and economics.

Beginning with students of the Class of 2013, the school required its incoming freshmen to enroll in a course called "Portico." This course, while serving as an introduction to CSOM for new undergraduates, also serves to teach new students about business ethics through the readings of Plato, Aristotle, Immanuel Kant, and Ayn Rand. This course will supersede the previous version of the course, which was known as "Introduction to Ethics."

Students may dual-concentrate (but not triple-concentrate) within CSOM, pursue minors in either the Lynch School of Education or in the College of Arts and Sciences, enroll in the pre-med program, or even pursue a full major in the College of Arts and Sciences while enrolled as a student in CSOM. CSOM offers concentrations in accounting, accounting information systems, business analytics, corporate reporting, computer science, economics, entrepreneurship, finance, general management, information system, management leadership, marketing, and operations management.

== Graduate program ==
The Carroll School's graduate programs include: a Master of Business Administration (full-time MBA and part-time MBA), a Master of Science in finance, a Master of Science in accounting and three Doctor of Philosophy programs in accounting, finance, and organization studies respectively.

=== MBA programs ===
The admissions rate for the Carroll School's Class of 2019 was 39%. Applicants are required to take the GMAT exam. Of the admitted applicants, the median score was 637 and the middle 80% of scores ranged from 580 to 700. All full-time M.B.A. students are required to complete a specialization area, such as Asset Management, Corporate Finance, or Global Management. There are more than 34,000 Carroll graduates working around the globe, and some of the notable alumni include Ronald Logue, chairman and former CEO of financial services firm State Street Corp., and Denis O’Brien, chairman of mobile phone network provider Digicel.

=== M.S. programs ===
Carroll School offers two M.S. programs including Master of Science in finance and Master of Science in accounting.

=== Ph.D. programs ===
Carroll School offers three doctor of philosophy programs including Ph.D. in accounting, Ph.D. in finance, and Ph.D. in organization studies. It takes five years to complete the doctoral program. Carroll School's Ph.D. programs admission is highly selective, and graduates have become successful teachers and scholars at leading management schools around the globe, such as Harvard University, University of Pennsylvania, University of Notre Dame, Indiana University Bloomington, Texas A&M University, University of Hong Kong, etc.

== Rankings ==
=== Undergraduate rankings ===
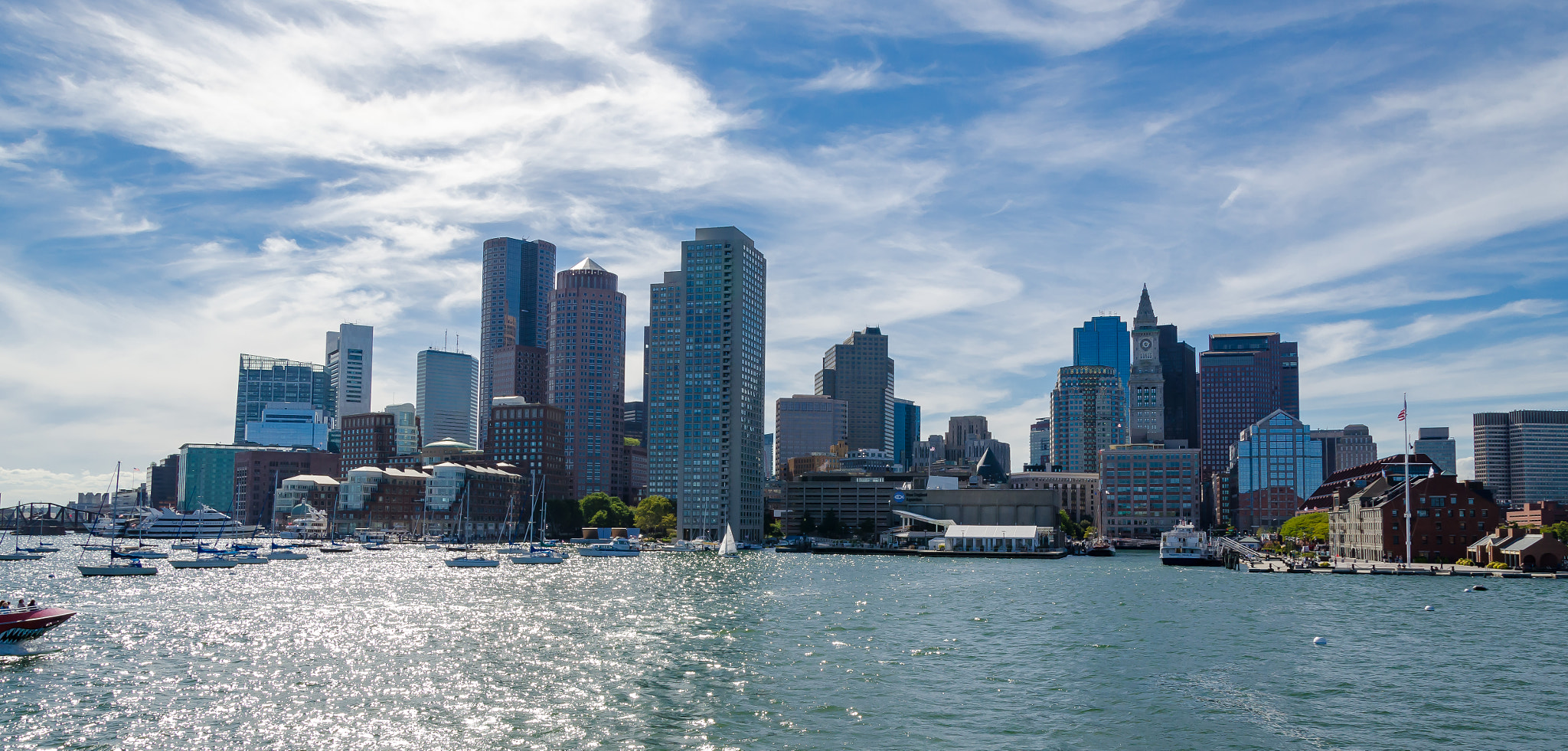
Skyline of Boston's Financial District

- #3 BusinessWeek, 2016
  - #10 for Finance, 2013
  - #5 for Accounting, 2012
  - #9 for Corporate Strategy, 2012
  - #4 for Information Systems, 2012
- #24 U.S. News & World Report, 2013
  - #8 for Finance, 2022
  - #22 for Management, 2013
  - #26 for Accounting, 2012

=== M.B.A. rankings ===
- #41 U.S. News & World Report, 2023
  - #30 for Part-time M.B.A.

=== Subject rankings ===
- ShanghaiRanking's Global Ranking of Academic Subjects, 2021
  - #7 for Finance
  - #51-75 for Business Administration
  - #101-150 for Management

== General academics ==
=== Departments ===
The Carroll School is organized into seven academic departments, as listed below:

- Accounting
- Business Analytics
- Business Law and Society
- Finance
- Information Systems
- Management and Organizations
- Marketing

=== Research centers and executive programs ===
The Carroll School is home to seven research centers and four executive programs.

==== Research centers ====
- Center for Corporate Citizenship
- Center for Retirement Research
- Winston Center for Leadership and Ethics
- Center for Work and Family
- Edmund H. Shea Jr., Center for Entrepreneurship
- Lynch Leadership Academy
- Joseph E. Corcoran Center for Real Estate and Urban Action

==== Executive programs ====
- Office of Corporate Government and Affairs
- Boston College Business Institute
- Boston College International Business Initiative
- Leadership for Change

== Boston College Center for Corporate Citizenship ==
Boston College Center for Corporate Citizenship
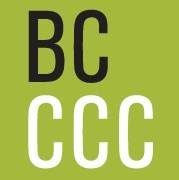
- Established: 1985
- Headquarters: Carroll School of Management
- Location(s): 140 Commonwealth Ave; Chestnut Hill, Massachusetts
- Director: Katherine V. Smith
- Main organ: Journal of Corporate Citizenship
- Affiliations: Boston College; Society of Jesus, Catholic
- Staff: 19
- Website: CCC.BC
- Remarks: Courses are restricted to employees of corporations.

The Center for Corporate Citizenship at Boston College is a membership-based research and education center in the Carroll School of Management. The center provides knowledge and learning opportunities designed to help executives, managers and employees advance positive corporate citizenship from wherever they sit in the organization. It offers research, tools, conferences, networking, and executive education programs pertaining to issues of corporate citizenship/corporate social responsibility to corporate members worldwide. Much of its research is freely available to the public, and can be downloaded from its website.

The Center for Corporate Citizenship facilitates interchange among corporate responsibility thought leaders, "people who have been working within the system to create new institutions to put pressure on corporations to behave in ways that account for their core values." Its activities have been reported on by The New York Times, The Boston Globe, and the Boston Business Journal, as well as by online journals, such as CSRwire, Ethical Performance, and SocialFunds. The center also helped develop and launch the Journal of Corporate Citizenship, which focuses explicitly on integrating theory about corporate citizenship with management practice. Its sponsorship includes film festivals, international conferences, and research.

== Boston College Chief Executives Club ==
The Boston College Chief Executives Club is a premier business forum program, in partnership with the Carroll School, that attracts chief executives from various fields as keynote speakers to address their peers. Among past speakers are Disney's Bob Iger, Nike's Mark Parker, IBM's Virginia Rometty, and home décor entrepreneur Martha Stewart. The club is governed by a Board of Governors drawn from Boston's business leadership. Club membership is exclusive to corporate membership.

== See also ==
- List of United States business school rankings
- List of business schools in the United States
