= Thought: A Journal of Philosophy =

- Discipline: Philosophy
- Language: English
- Edited by: John Divers, Kathrin Glüer-Pagin, and Crispin Wright

Publication details
- History: 2012–present
- Publisher: Philosophy Documentation Center
- Frequency: Quarterly

Standard abbreviations
- ISO 4: Thought: J. Philos.

Indexing
- ISSN: 2161-2234
- OCLC no.: 785492537

Links
- Journal homepage; Online access; Online archive

Thought: A Journal of Philosophy is a quarterly peer-reviewed academic journal published by the Philosophy Documentation Center in cooperation with the Thought Trust. The journal covers logic, philosophy of mathematics, philosophy of mind, epistemology, philosophy of language, and metaphysics. The editors-in-chief are Crispin Wright (Universities of Stirling and New York), John Divers (University of Leeds), and Kathrin Glüer-Pagin (Stockholm University). From 2012 to 2021 this journal was published by Wiley-Blackwell.

== Abstracting and indexing ==
Thought: A Journal of Philosophy is abstracted and indexed in Academic OneFile, Arts & Humanities Citation Index, The Philosopher's Index, PhilPapers, and Scopus.
