= Saint Sebastian Tended by Saint Irene =

Subject of many religious artworks

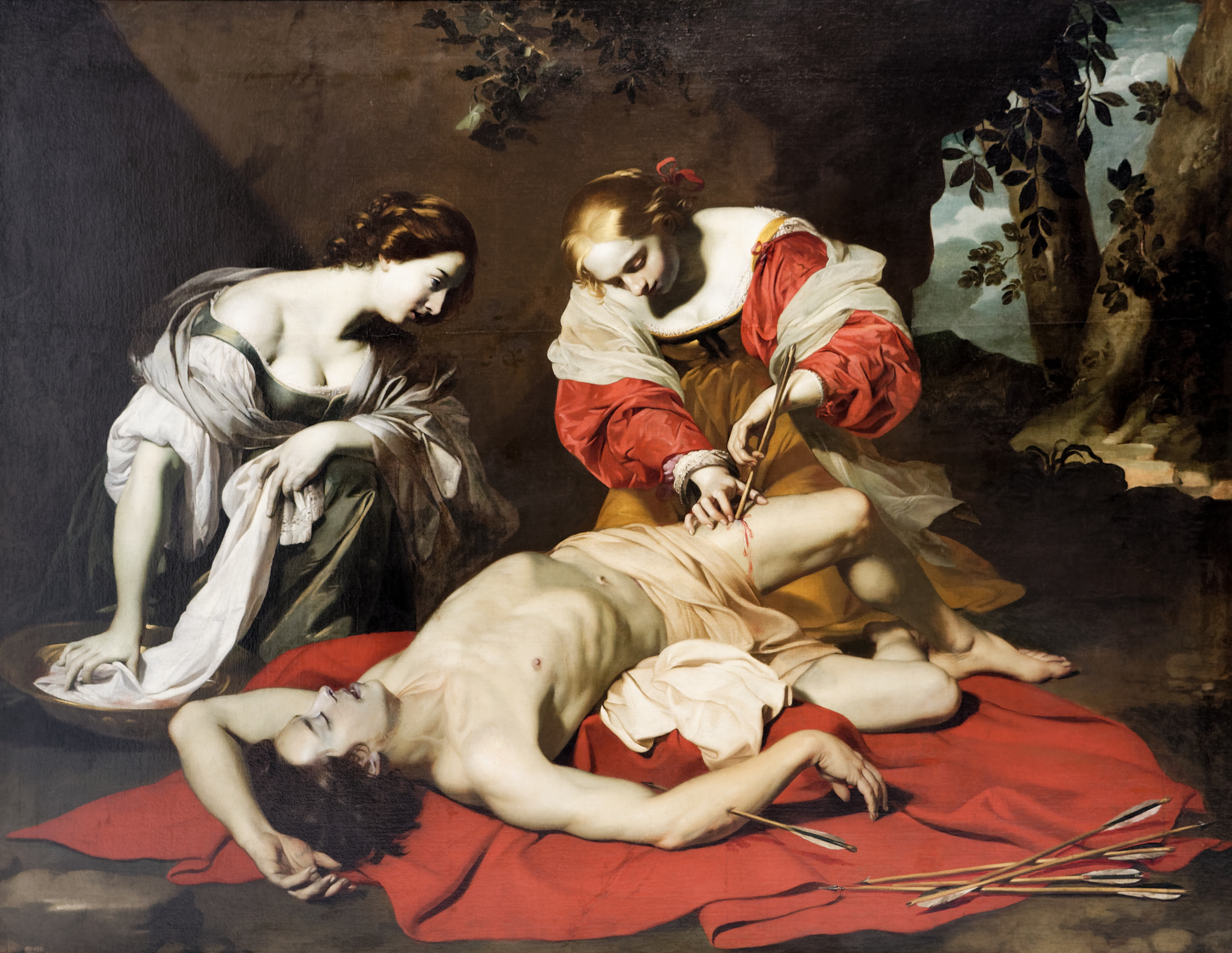
One of three versions of the subject by Nicolas Régnier, c. 1625

Saint Sebastian Tended by Saint Irene is an incident in the legends of Saint Sebastian and Saint Irene of Rome. It was not prominent in the hagiographical literature until the late Renaissance, and is hardly seen in art before then. As an artistic subject, normally in painting, it suddenly became popular from the 1610s, though found in predella scenes as early as the 15th century, and was most popular until about the 1670s.

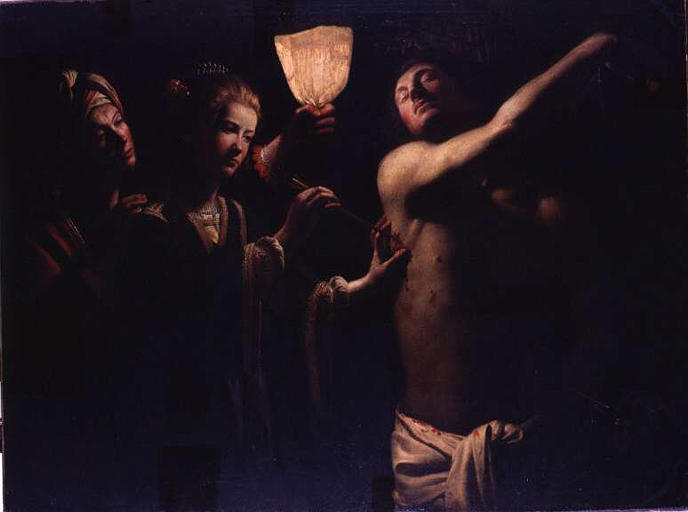
Trophime Bigot, 1620–1634, Musée des Beaux-Arts de Bordeaux, Bordeaux

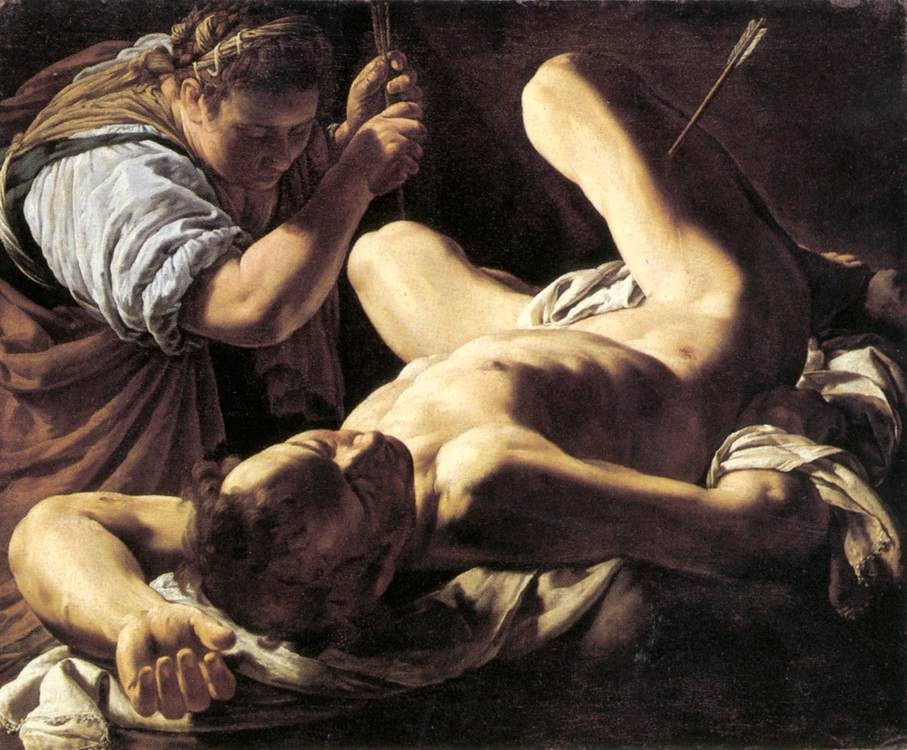
Marco Antonio Bassetti, c. 1620

Though Sebastian is famously tied to a tree or post and shot with many arrows, in his story he always survives this, only to be killed with stones some time later; these ordeals are sometimes called his "first" and "second martyrdom". The tending by Saint Irene takes place between these, after the archery, when she, normally accompanied by her maid, enters the story. She is shown either taking an unconscious Sebastian down from the tree or post to which he is tied or when he has been found a bed and his wounds are being treated. In both scenes Irene is usually shown pulling out one of the arrows. Sometimes she is shown putting ointment on the wounds; a jar of ointment was her attribute. Both scenes are often shown taking place in darkness, and the treatment scene typically seems to take place in one of the catacombs of Rome, whose rediscovery was ongoing around 1600 (although the literary story specifies Irene's house).

Devotion to Saint Sebastian was driven by his reputation as a protector from the plague, which was still a very dangerous disease in 17th-century cities. Many of these images can be interpreted in the light of contemporary beliefs and practices around plague. They also reflect Counter-Reformation ideas about the role of women.

The subject gives emphasis to courageous initiative and useful activity by women, though of a type considered appropriate to their sex. Sebastian is either unconscious or helpless in nearly all depictions. This is very much in line with Counter-Reformation ideas, which encouraged saintly female role models who went beyond the largely passive victimhood of medieval depictions of female martyrs, expressing "the Counter-Reformatory desire to project Catholicism as a caring faith, with a visible dimension of social responsibility".

== In art ==
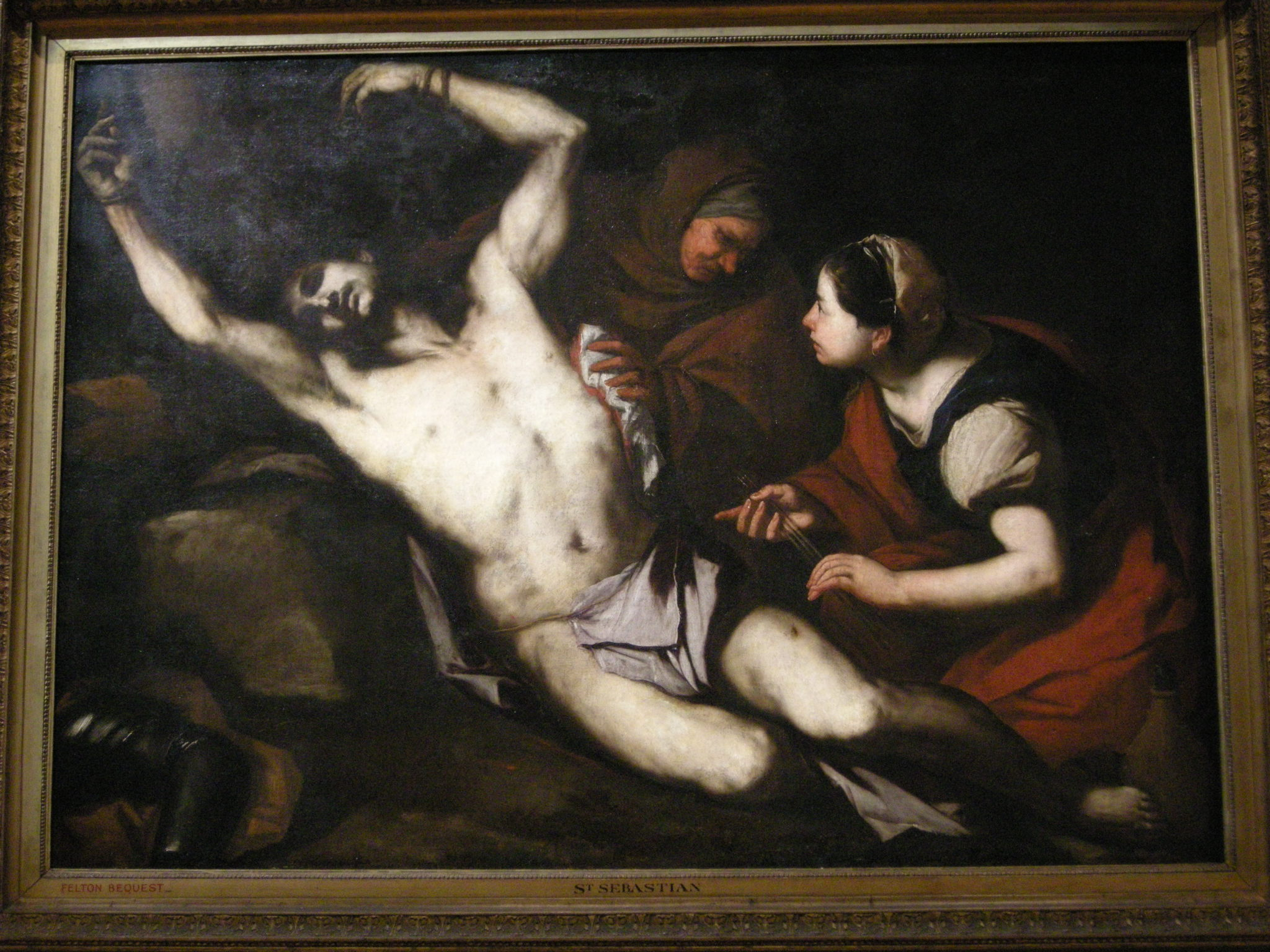
Luca Giordano, c. 1653. National Gallery of Victoria.

One of the earliest paintings of Sebastian being nursed is by Josse Lieferinxe in about 1497, part of a cycle from an altarpiece in Marseille (now Philadelphia Museum of Art), but the subject was rare until the 17th century, and treated as part of a series of Sebastian's life. It is first found as an independent subject in the 17th century, when it was painted by Georges de La Tour at least twice, Trophime Bigot (four times), Jusepe de Ribera twice, Hendrick ter Brugghen (in perhaps his masterpiece) and many others. The subject appears to have been a deliberate attempt by the Church to get away from the traditional depiction of the standing almost-nude Sebastian being shot with arrows. This is already recorded in Vasari (in relation to a painting by Fra Bartolommeo) as sometimes arousing inappropriate thoughts among female churchgoers.

Baroque artists often treated the new scene as nocturnal, illuminated by a single candle, torch or lantern, in the chiaroscuro "candlelight" style fashionable in the first half of the 17th century. All the versions by or attributed to de La Tour and Bigot are candlelit. With a few exceptions with a large vertical "altarpiece" size, the paintings are mostly horizontal in format and the main figures occupy most of the picture space, giving an intimate and intense depiction of the scene. Sebastian is often given an elaborately contorted pose, with limbs reaching the edge of the picture space. Very often at least one wrist remains tied to the tree. In particular he often has a straight raised arm running diagonally across the picture space, a motif that has been traced through the works of various artists spreading from Italy to the Netherlands.

Sebastian's death was firmly located in Rome, where he was the third patron saint, and churches dedicated to him were built on the supposed locations of the events. The subject was mainly painted by artists in Italy, and also by a number in the Low Countries. By the 18th century the subject becomes less common, as Irene and her maid are often replaced by angels, or become nameless "women", as those by Paul Troger (Österreichische Galerie Belvedere, Vienna, 1746) are called by the gallery. Late treatments include two paintings by Eugène Delacroix, one of 1858 (LACMA, Los Angeles), and one exhibited in 1836, now Église Saint-Michel, Nantua, France.

== Subject ==
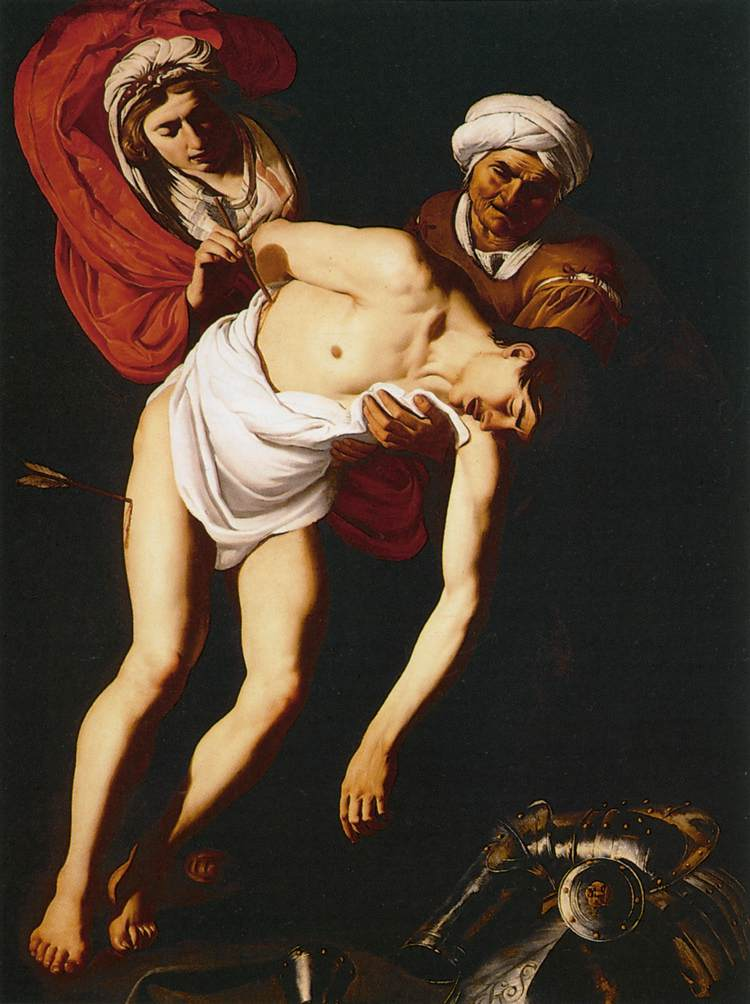
Dirck van Baburen, c. 1615, Thyssen-Bornemisza Museum, Madrid, one of the first northern depictions

Standard redactions of the Late medieval Golden Legend merely say "The night after [the ordeal by archery] came a Christian woman for to take his body and to bury it, but she found him alive and brought him to her house, and took charge of him till he was all whole." Identifying the "Christian woman" as the hitherto very obscure Irene came later, and was popularised by Cardinal Caesar Baronius (1538–1607), a leading historian of the church, and one of the writers telling Catholic artists what treatments were appropriate in Counter-Reformation art. His account appeared in volume 3 of his Annales Ecclesiastici, published in 1592. Irene had been named in a 5th-century source, but the name had been forgotten. Both Sebastian and Irene appear in fairly early Christian literature, but details of their lives are essentially legend.

The few scenes before this point, probably all from altarpiece series on the life of Sebastian (there is one by Albrecht Altdorfer), were presumably intending to depict only the anonymous "Christian woman" of the medieval tradition. Now, as vernacular versions of Baronius' account appeared (including a translation into Dutch/Flemish), artists soon began to paint it as a distinct subject, with the added attraction of the possibilities for chiaroscuro offered by both the usual points in the story chosen for depiction.

Baronius had also tried (later followed by Cardinal Federico Borromeo) to get artists to follow the traditional legend, and early medieval depictions considered authoritative, and show Sebastian as a mature if not elderly man. But almost invariably artists continued to show the saint as a young man, rather sensuously depicted, and with as little clothing as in the earlier paintings. Irene, the widow of a mature martyr in her legend, also tends to be painted as young and beautiful, with the version by Hendrick ter Brugghen one exception.

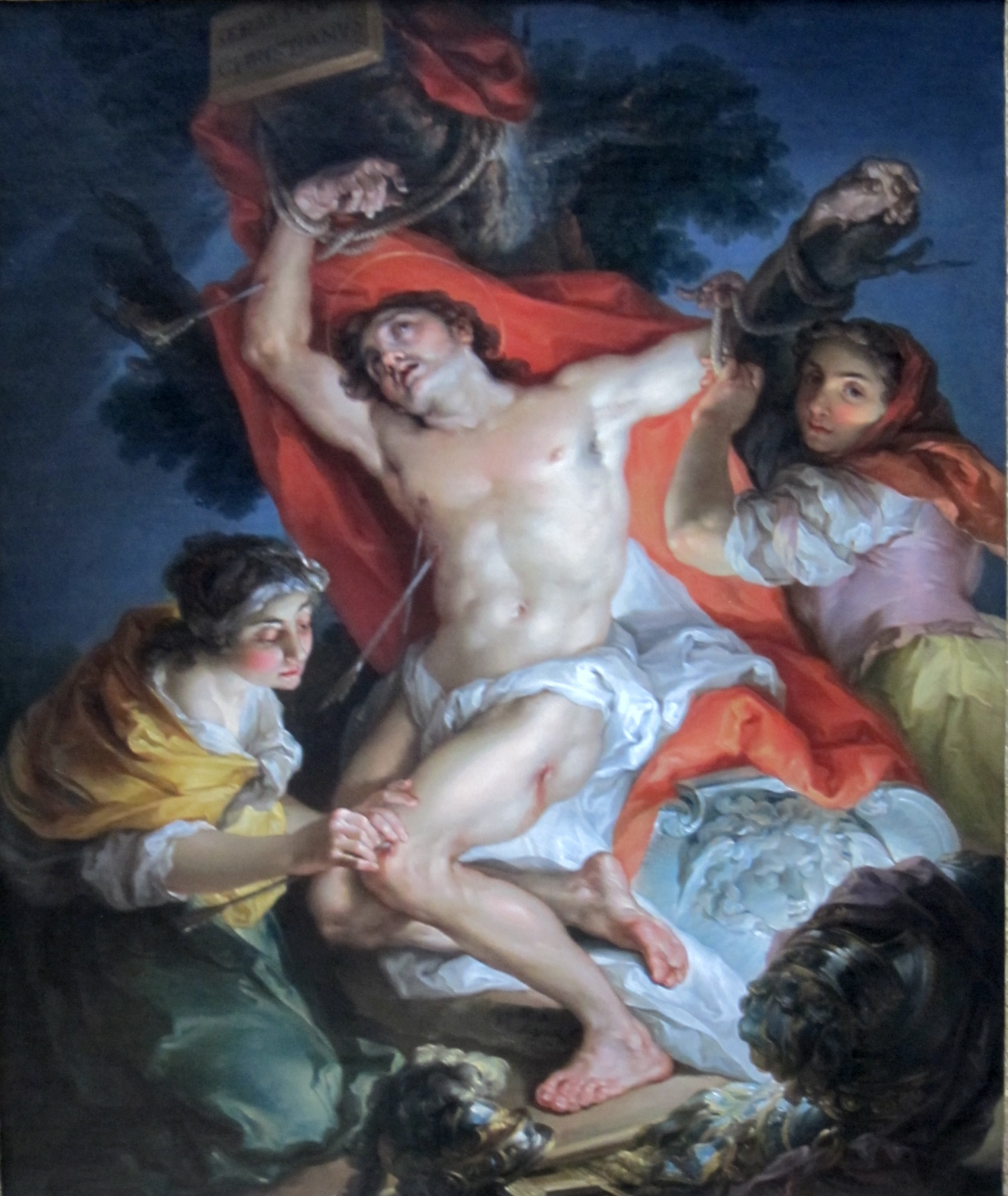
Vicente López Portaña, 1795–1800, a rather late Spanish version

The subject, especially in the depictions where Sebastian has been got clear of his post or tree, has clear similarities to two other scenes from secular Italian epic romances: Angelica and Medoro from Orlando Furioso by Ludovico Ariosto (1516) and Erminia and Tancredi from Gerusalemme liberata by Torquato Tasso 1581. In both of these the hero is wounded in battle, and nursed by his lover; the scene from Tasso was especially popular as a subject, often as part of a cycle. In both the heroes are usually shown sprawled and largely unclothed, their armour often being shown discarded near them, which is also a feature of some Sebastians. There is a painting of the Ariosto subject by Simone Peterzano, who died in 1599, but most treatments of both subjects come from the same broad period after about 1620 as those of Sebastian and Irene. The compositions where Sebastian remains semi-upright as the women untie him inevitably recall the subject of the Descent from the Cross of Christ.

== Medical aspects ==
Sebastian had always been a popular saint to invoke against the plague, and depictions of him to some extent rose and fell with the pattern of epidemics. In every one of the years 1624–1629, Utrecht, the main Dutch centre of Catholic history painting, was hit by plague, and it was probably what killed Hendrick ter Brugghen in November 1629, at around the age of 40, four years after he painted his version.

One aspect of the new images was that they firmly endorsed medical treatment; one strand of medieval thinking had been that attempts to flee or treat the plague, seen as partly an expression of divine displeasure, were both useless and "presumption" in the face of God's wrath. A painting by Francisco Pacheco (c. 1616) for a hospital named after Sebastian and run by a religious confraternity professionalises Irene, showing Sebastian sitting up in bed, and Irene in the habit of a nun working in the hospital. The actions of Irene (and her unnamed maid) also reflect the continuing injunction of both the Catholic church and Protestant denominations that people should not flee places with the plague, as many doctors advised individual patients.

The raised arm motif seen in many versions can be related to a characteristic gesture of plague patients, as the armpit and adjacent areas of the torso and upper arms are common sites for the swollen and sensitive buboes that mark the full onset of bubonic plague, forcing the patient to adopt such a pose. In at least the ter Brugghen painting, the appearance of Sebastian appears to be that of a plague victim in several points of detail.

== Paintings ==
With articles:

- Saint Sebastian Tended by Saint Irene (Hendrick ter Brugghen), 1625
- Saint Sebastian Tended by Saint Irene (Georges de La Tour, Gemäldegalerie), Berlin, c. 1634–1643
- Saint Sebastian Tended by Saint Irene (Georges de La Tour, Louvre), c. 1649 (a later version of the Berlin composition). He is attributed with another painting, with a different composition, in Seattle.
- Saint Sebastian, Martyr by Théodule Ribot, 1865

Also:

- Jusepe de Ribera, Bilbao, c. 1621 and Hermitage Museum, 1628. He also painted several traditional "first martyrdom" scenes.
- Bernardo Strozzi, 1631–1636, Boston.
- Nicolas Régnier, Ferens Art Gallery, Hull; also different compositions in Rouen and (attrib.) the Mauritshuis
- Felice Ficherelli, 1650, Crocker Art Museum
- Ludovico Lana, St. Sebastian and St. Irene (etching, Modena, Italy, 1643), Philadelphia Museum of Art
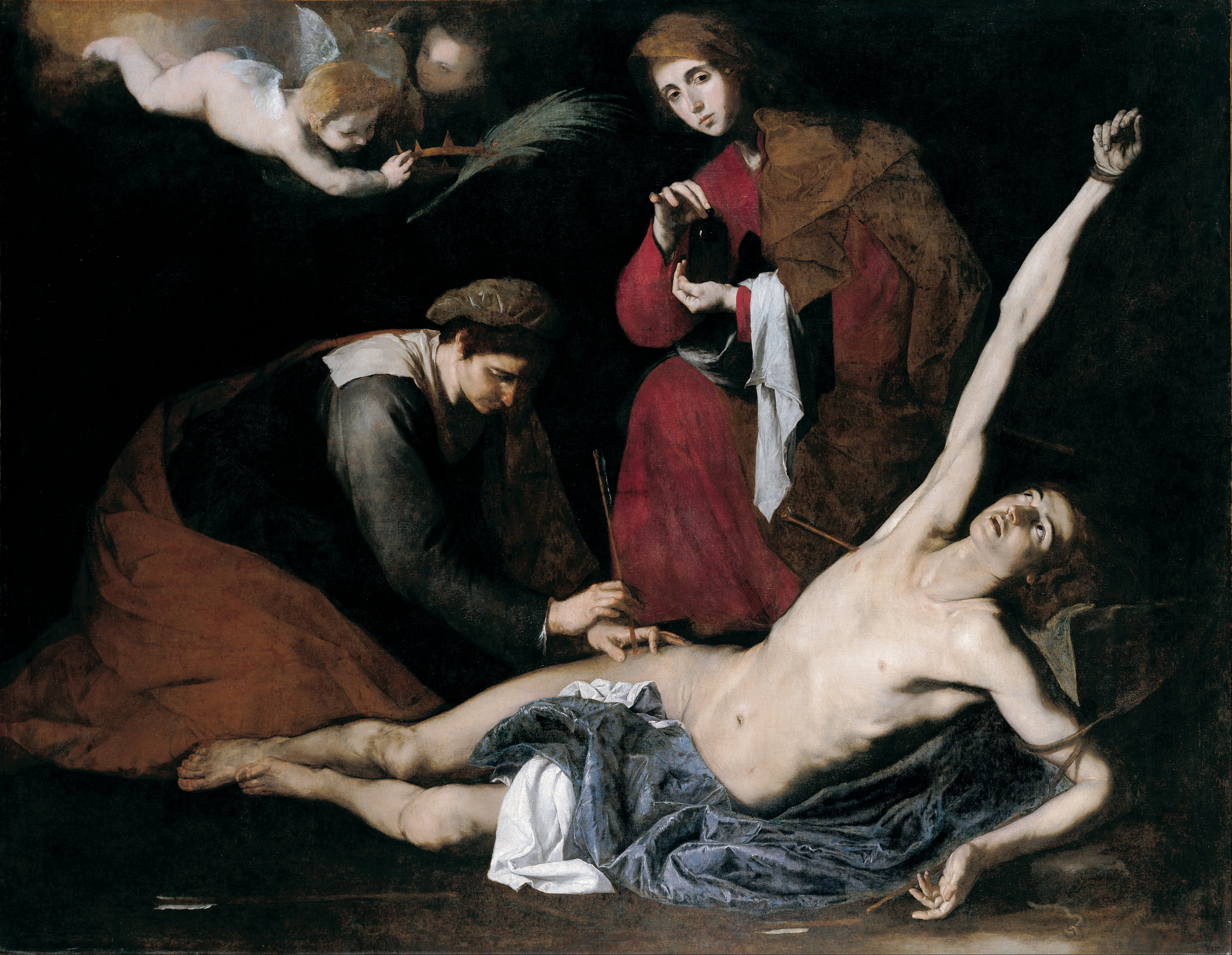
Jusepe de Ribera, 1621, Bilbao Fine Arts Museum, Bilbao

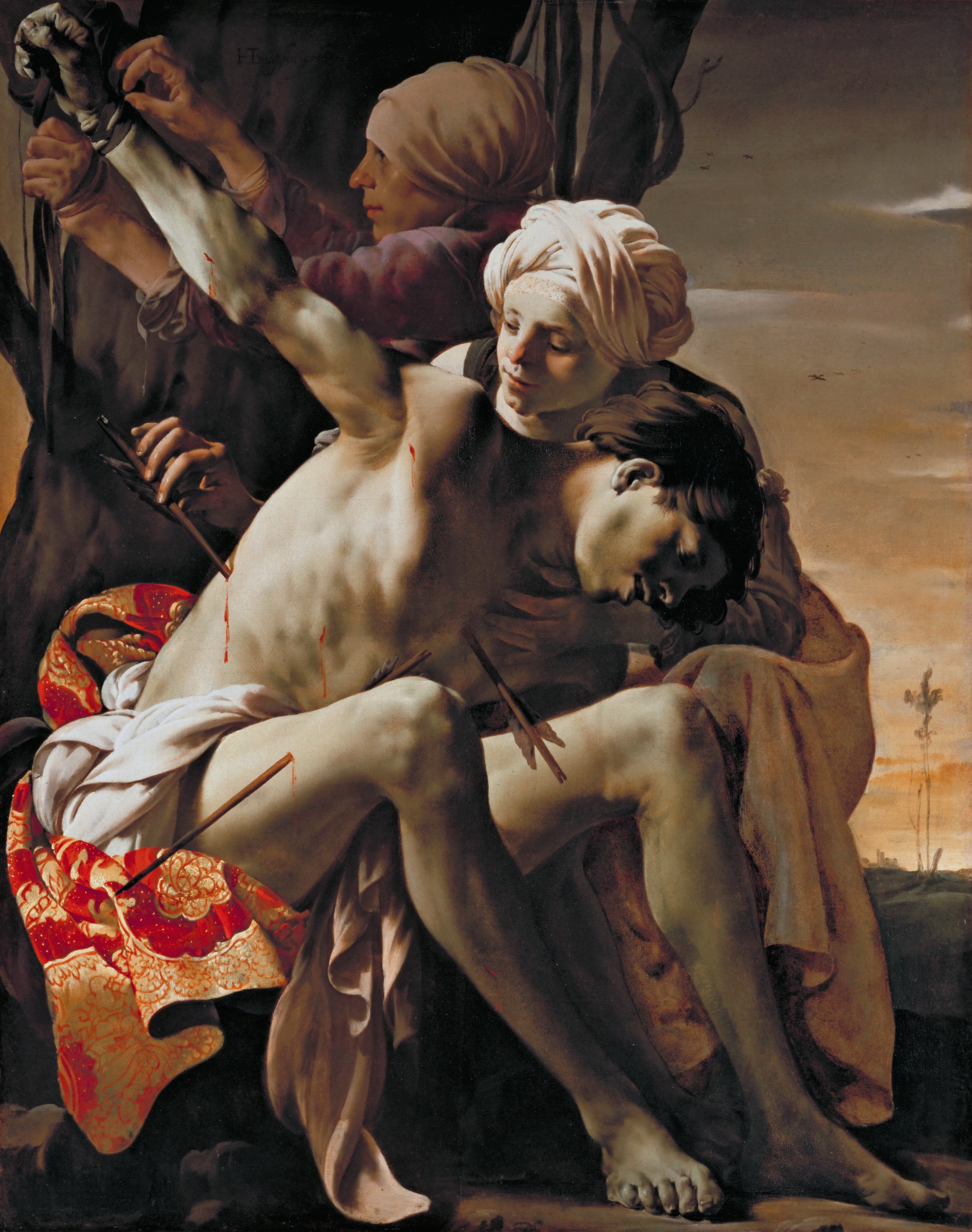
Saint Sebastian Tended by Saint Irene (Hendrick ter Brugghen), 1625, Allen Memorial Art Museum, Oberlin, Ohio

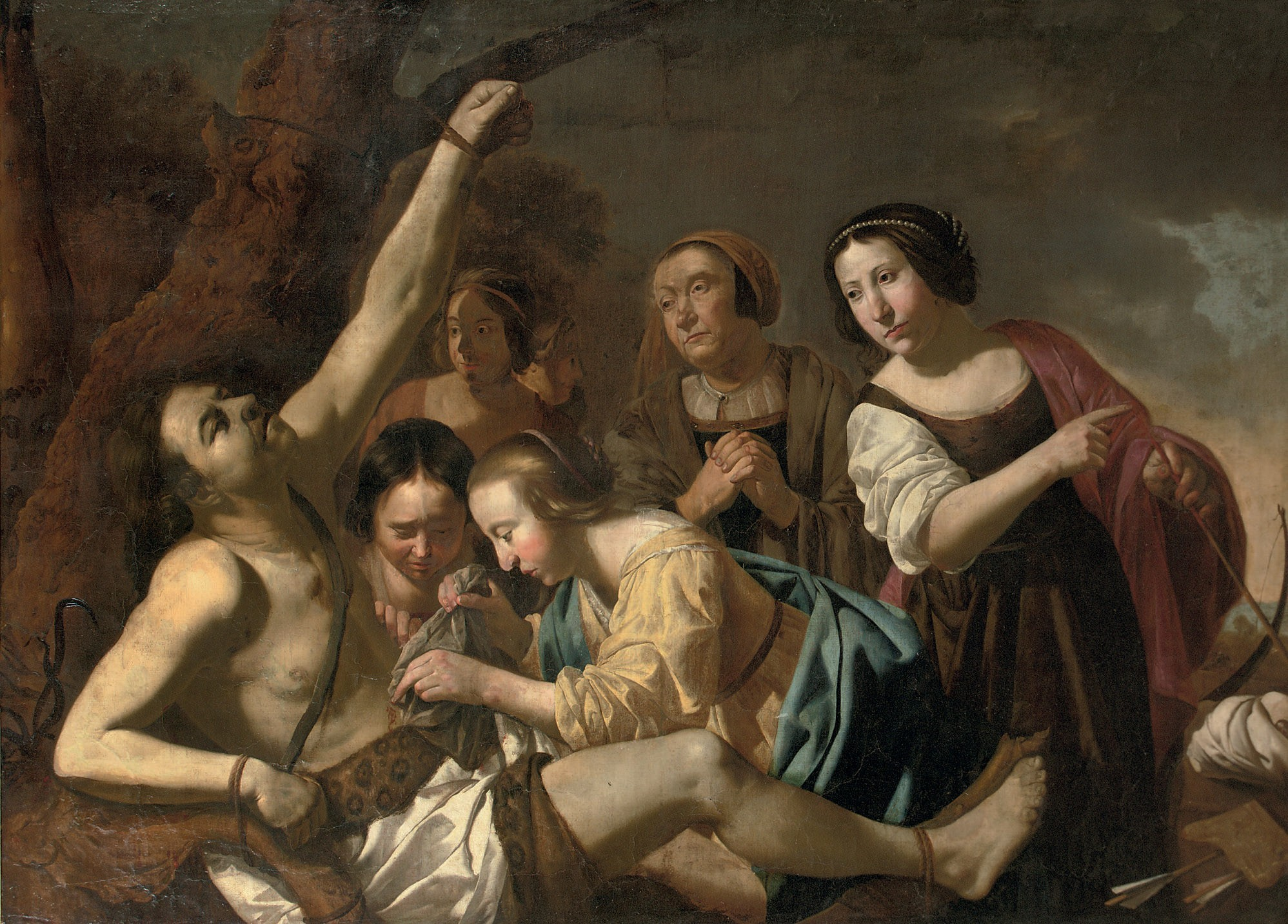
Jan van Bijlert, c. 1620s (private collection)

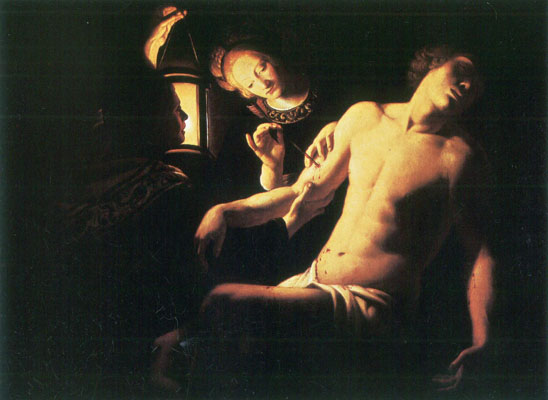
Trophime Bigot, 1620–1634, Vatican Pinacoteca, Vatican Museums, Rome

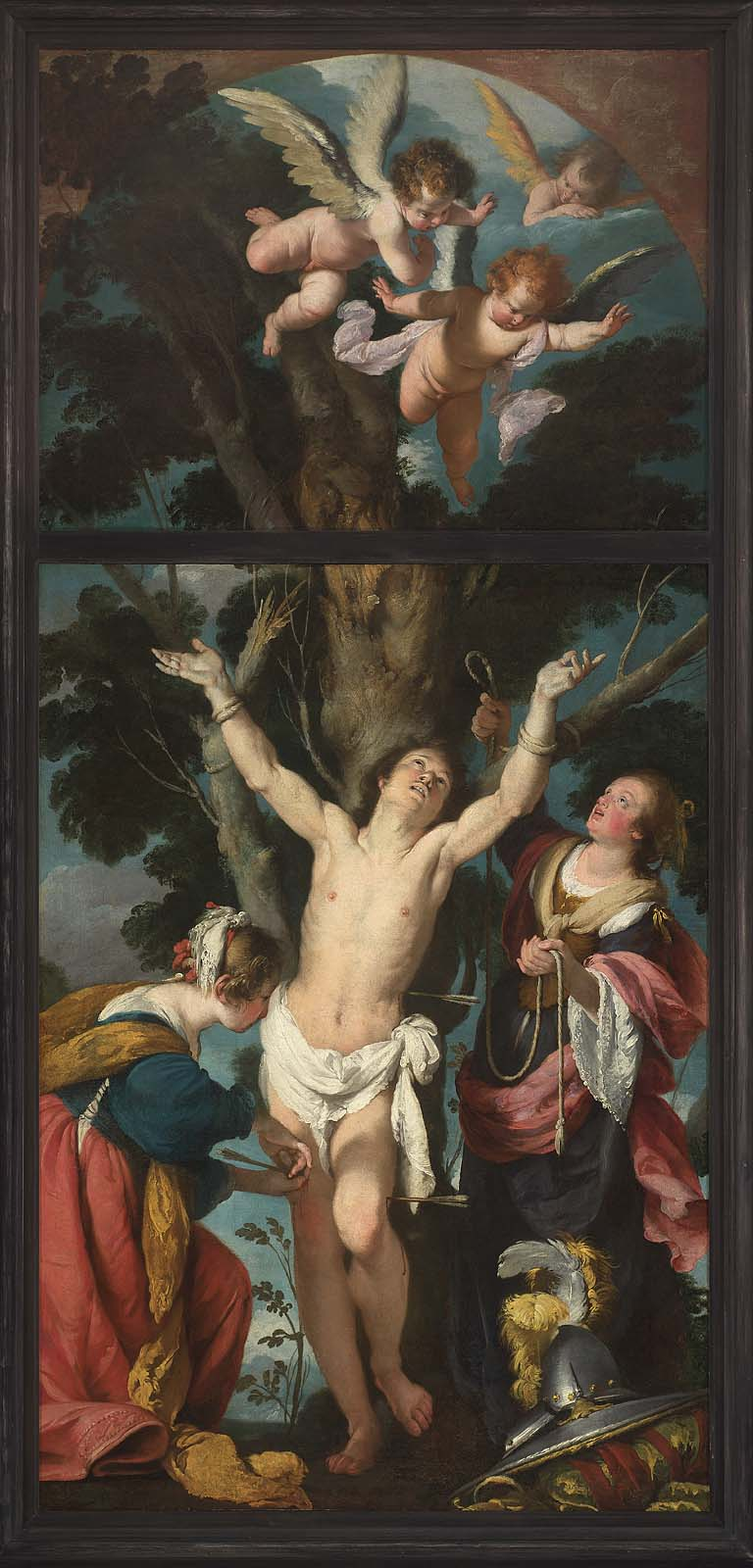
Bernardo Strozzi, 1631–1636, Museum of Fine Arts, Boston

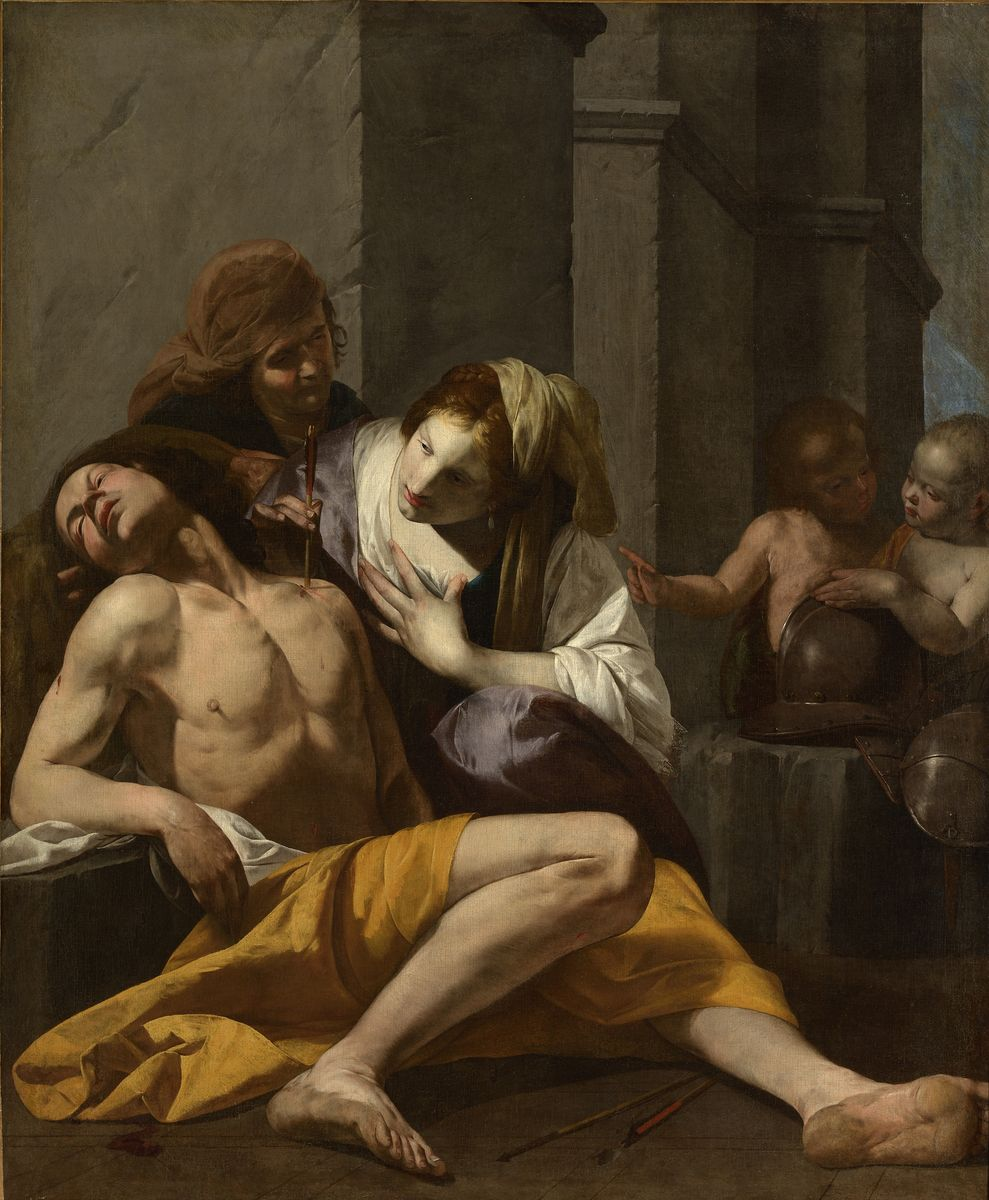
Antonio de Bellis, 1640–1645, Museum of Fine Arts of Lyon, Lyon

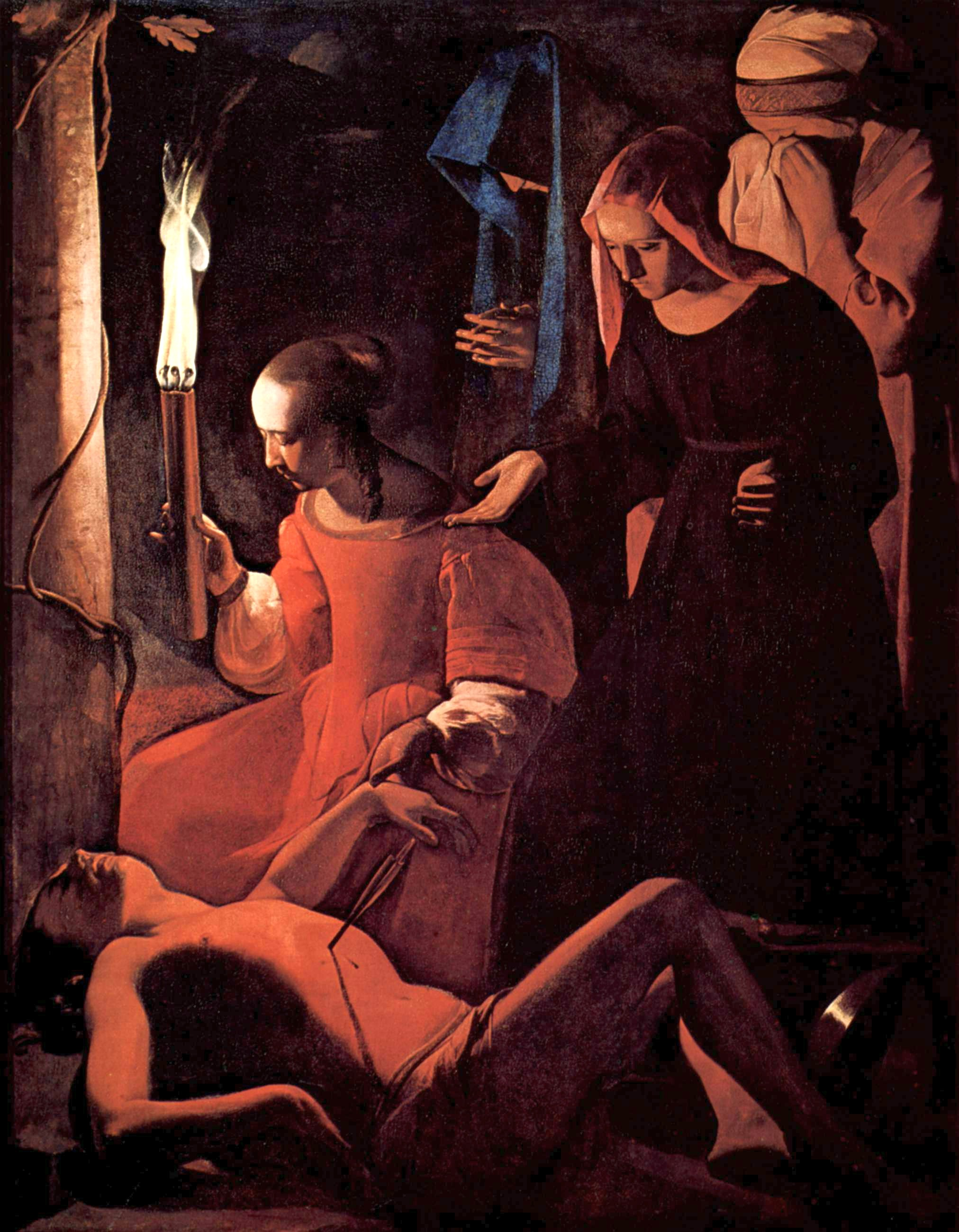
Saint Sebastian Tended by Saint Irene (Georges de La Tour, Louvre), c. 1649, Louvre, Paris

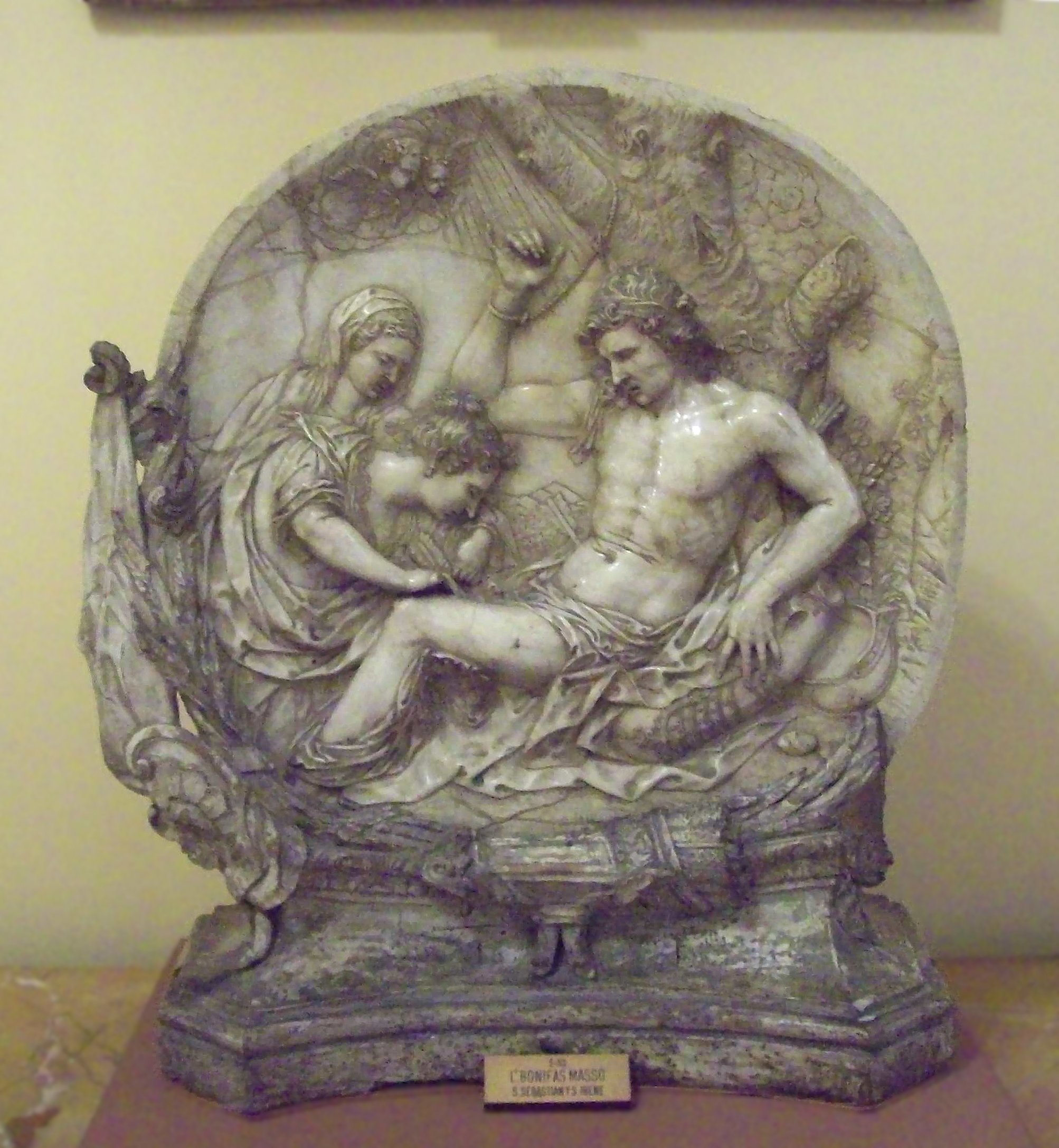
A rare sculpture, alabaster, 1763, Real Academia de Bellas Artes de San Fernando, Madrid

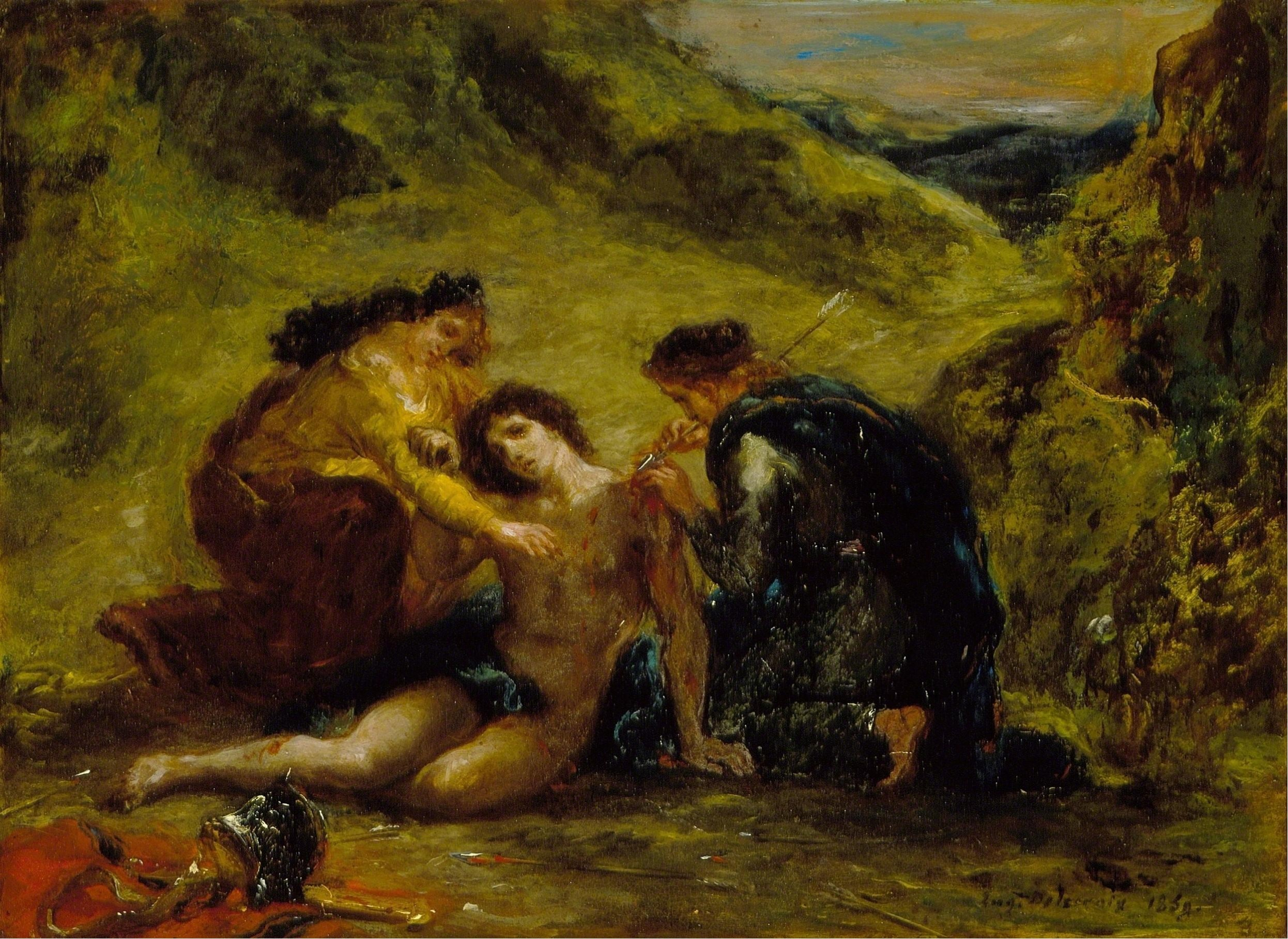
Eugène Delacroix, 1858, Los Angeles County Museum of Art

== Sources ==
- Barker, Sheila, "The Making of a Plague Saint", ch. 4 (pp. 114–7 especially) in Piety and Plague: from Byzantium to the Baroque, Ed. Franco Mormando, Thomas Worcester, Truman State University, 2007, ISBN 978-1-931112-73-4
- Boeckl, Christine M. Images of Plague and Pestilence: Iconography and Iconology (pp. 76–80). Truman State University, 2000, ISBN 9780943549859
- de Voragine, Jacobus, "The Life of Sebastian" (pp. 104–109) in The Golden Legend or Lives of the Saints, volume II, Ed. F.S. Ellis (ed), translated by William Caxton. London: Temple Classics (compiled 1275, first published 1470, Temple Classics edition published 1900). Retrieved 23 February 2019 – via Fordham University's Medieval Sourcebooks.
- Careri, Giovanni "Il corpo degli affetti", La fabbrica degli affetti. La Gerusalemme liberata dai Carracci a Tiepolo (pp. 93ff, in Italian), Milano: Il Saggiatore, 2010 ISBN 8865760303
- Hall, James, Hall's Dictionary of Subjects and Symbols in Art, 1996 (2nd edn.), John Murray, ISBN 0719541476
- Hedquist, Valerie, "Ter Brugghen’s Saint Sebastian Tended by Irene", Journal of Historians of Netherlandish Art 9:2 (Summer 2017) doi:10.5092/jhna.2017.9.2.3
- Mitchell, Peter, "The Politics of Morbidity: Plague Symbolism in Martyrdom and Medical Anatomy", in The Arts of 17th-Century Science: Representations of the Natural World in European and North American Culture, eds. Claire Jowitt, Diane Watt, 2002, Routledge, ISBN 9781351894449
- Wieseman, M. E. (n.d.) "Hendrick ter Brugghen, Saint Sebastian Tended by Irene, 1625", Dutch and Flemish Art, Allen Memorial Art Museum, Oberlin College & Conservatory. Retrieved 24 February 2019.
