= Saint Sebastian, Martyr =

Painting by Théodule Ribot

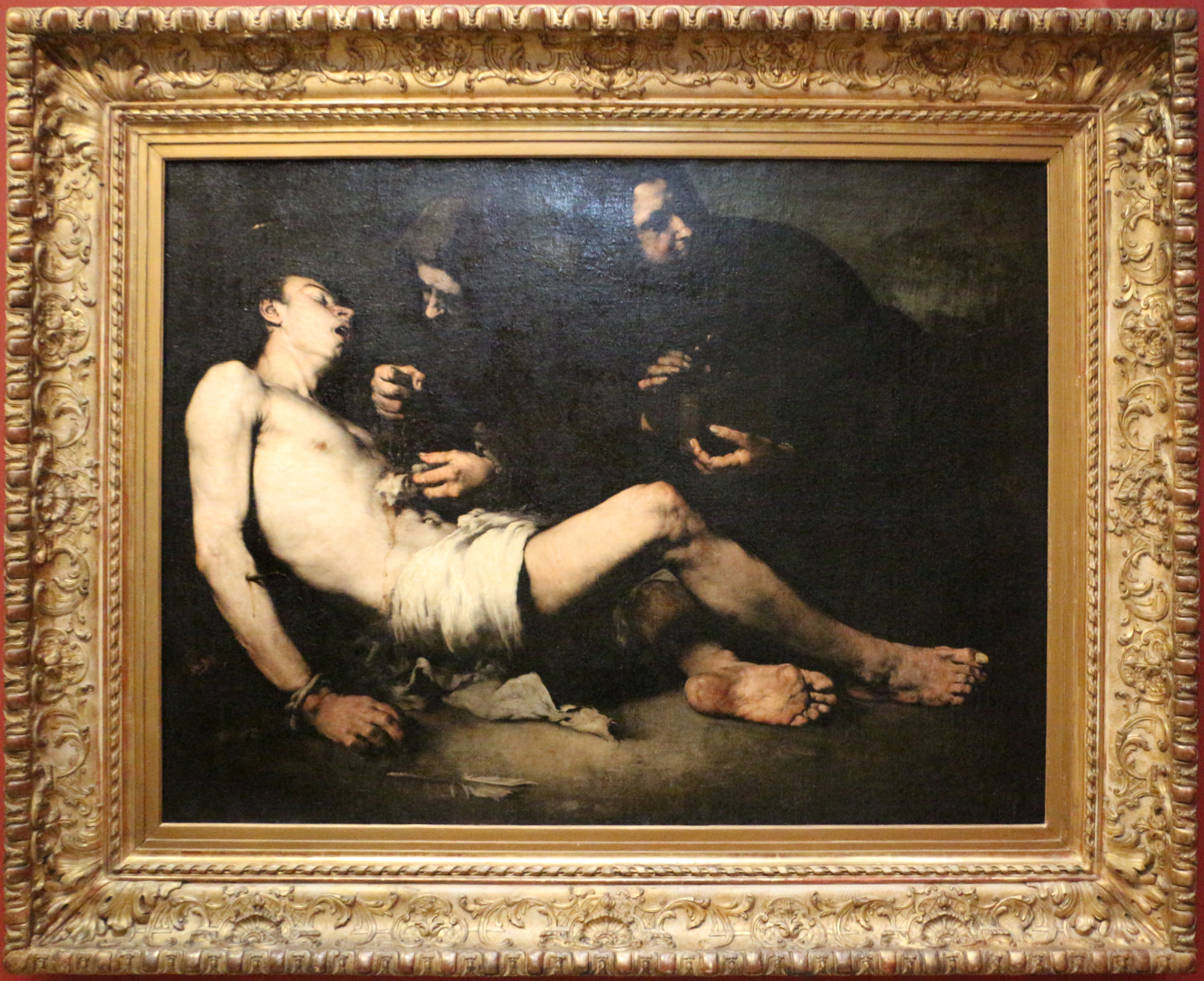
Théodule Ribot, Saint Sebastian, Martyr (1865)

Saint Sebastian, Martyr is a painting by Théodule Ribot. It was exhibited at the salon of 1865 and is now in the collection of the Musée d'Orsay, in Paris.

== Provenance ==
The painting was purchased by the French state from the 1865 salon for the Musée du Luxembourg where it remained until 1874. In that year it was assigned to the Louvre, and in 1980 it was reassigned to the Musée d’Orsay. This painting established Ribot’s reputation as a successful artist.

== Composition ==
Ribot’s painting did not depict Saint Sebastian in the conventional way, tied to a tree and pierced with arrows. Instead he focused on moments after the martyr was released, when Saint Irene and one of her servants were bathing his wounds. In this scene, only a broken arrow and the remains of a rope around his right wrist recall his ordeal. The painting is noteworthy mainly for its use of light. The scene is brightly lit from the upper right corner, so that Saint Sebastian’s body stands out against the kneeling women in dark clothing who are themselves obscured against the dark background. It should be noted though that the gradual shift from light to shadow that the contemporary gallery visitors sees is not what visitors in 1865 would have seen - the industrially produced paints Ribot used have slowly changed colour over time, meaning that the shadows are today much darker than they were when the canvas was painted. Nevertheless fr: Alfred Sensier commented, when the painting was first exhibited, that it was hard to tell what the women were doing.

== Exhibition history ==
- 1865 - Salon - Palais des Champs Elysées - France, Paris
- 1866 - Salon - Musée des Beaux-Arts de Bordeaux
- 1879 - International Art Exhibition - Glaspalast (Munich)
- 1918 - Contemporary French Painting 1870-1914 - unknown organization - Spain, Madrid
- 1934 - Retrospective exhibition: Th. Ribot, painter and etcher - town hall, Colombes
- 1969 - French 19th Century Painting - Minneapolis Institute of Art
- 1973-4 - Copies, Replicas, Pastiches - Louvre, Paris
- 1974 - The Luxembourg Museum in 1874 - paintings - National Galleries of the Grand Palais, Paris
- 1983-4 - Saint Sebastian, rituals and figures - Museum of Popular Arts and Traditions, Paris
- 2010 - Impressionism: A New Renaissance - Mapfre Foundation, Madrid,
- 2010 - Birth of Impressionism. Masterpieces from the Musée d'Orsay - Fine Arts Museums of San Francisco
- 2010-11 - Birth of Impressionism. Masterpieces from the Musée d'Orsay - Frist Art Museum, Nashville
- 2012-13 - Sensuality and Spirituality: In Search of the Absolute - Musée national Jean-Jacques Henner, Paris
- 2017 - Manet and Modern Paris - Palazzo Reale, Milan
- 2018-19 - Théodule Ribot, L'Esprit et la Chère - fr: Musée Roybet-Fould, Courbevoie
- 2019 - D'ombre et de lumière, Théodule Ribot (1823-1891) - fr: Musée municipal d'Art et d'Histoire de Colombes
- 2021-2 - Théodule Ribot (1823-1891). Une délicieuse obscurité - Musée des Augustins, Toulouse
- 2022 - Théodule Ribot (1823-1891). Une délicieuse obscurité - Musée des beaux-arts de Marseille
- 2022 - Théodule Ribot (1823-1891). Une délicieuse obscurité - Musée des Beaux-Arts de Caen

== Critical reception ==
The painting was one of the great successes of the 1865 salon. Théophile Thoré-Bürger described Ribot as “more of a painter than all of the Prix de Rome winners taken together” though he did find the subject of the painting anachronistic. Frédéric Bazille admired the painting and Ernest Chesneau regarded Saint Sebastian, martyr as “the most prodigious piece of execution in the entire salon.” William Crary Brownell described it as “one of the most powerful pictures of modern French art… painted with a vigor and point of realistic detail… peculiar to our time.” As the painting was popular, an etching was made of it for wider publication.

Some people were critical of Ribot’s tendency to produce works that were seen as derivative of pieces by Jusepe de Ribera, and Saint Sebastian, martyr was one such work, both in terms of its theme and its treatment, highly reminiscent of Ribera’s effective use of lighting to create contrast in his canvasses. Maxime Du Camp commented that if the black areas on the canvas got any darker, the picture would become unintelligible.

== See also ==
- Saint Sebastian Tended by Saint Irene
