= Saint Sebastian Tended by Saint Irene (Georges de La Tour, Gemäldegalerie) =

Painting by Georges de La Tour

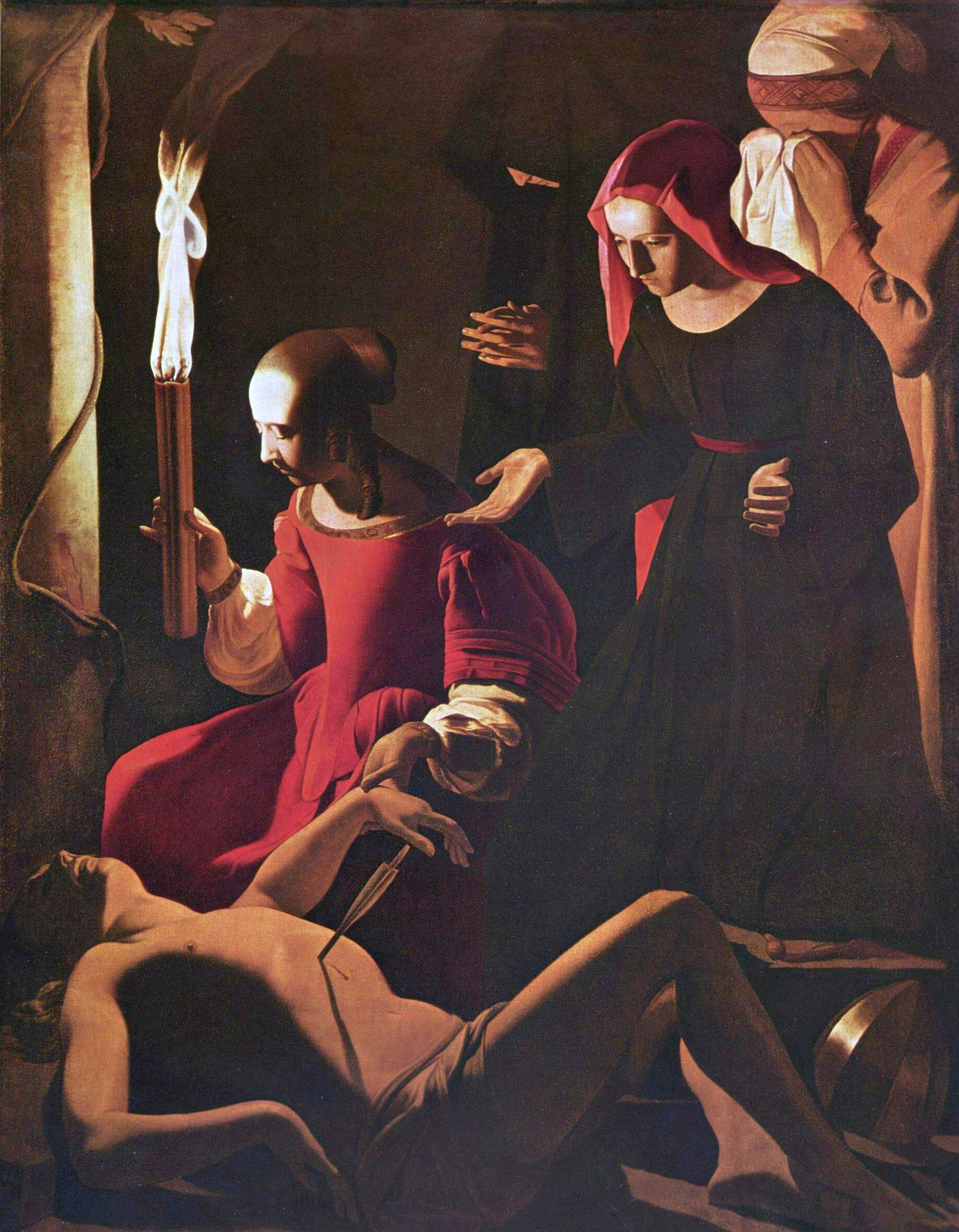
- Artist: Georges de La Tour
- Year: c. 1634–1643
- Medium: oil on canvas
- Dimensions: 160 cm × 129 cm (63 in × 51 in)
- Location: Gemäldegalerie, Berlin

Saint Sebastian Tended by Saint Irene is a c. 1634–1643 oil-on-canvas painting of Saint Sebastian having his wounds tended by Saint Irene, which suddenly became a popular subject in the 1620s. It is now in the Gemäldegalerie, Berlin.

It was previously thought to be the original composition of the subject by Georges de La Tour, but that is now thought to be the version of the work in the Louvre, with the Berlin work being a copy by his son Etienne with some retouching by Georges.
