= Saint Sebastian Tended by Saint Irene (Hendrick ter Brugghen) =

Painting by Hendrick ter Brugghen

Saint Sebastian Tended by Irene
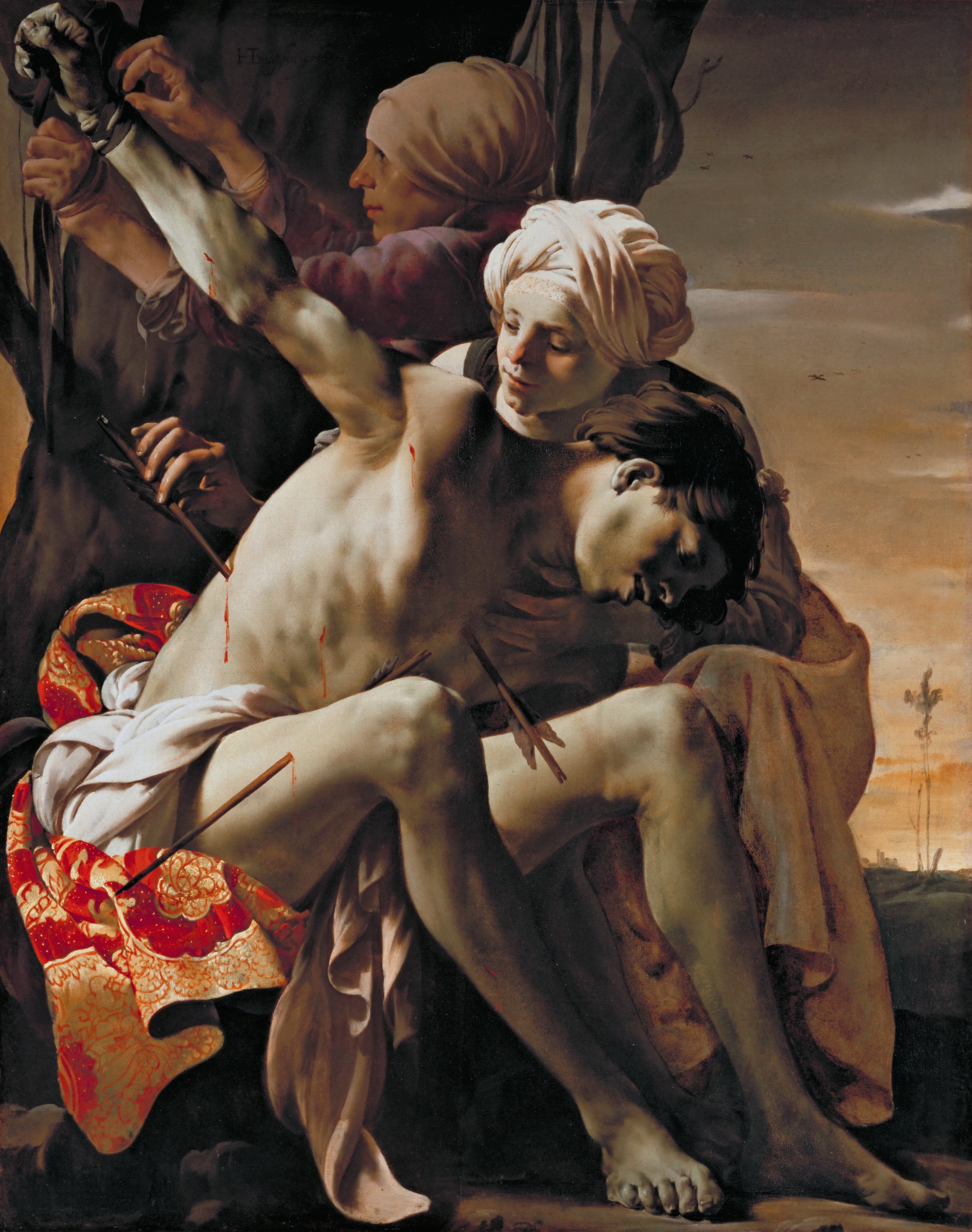
- Artist: Hendrick ter Brugghen
- Year: 1625
- Medium: Oil on canvas
- Dimensions: 149 cm × 119.4 cm (49 in × 16 in)
- Location: Allen Memorial Art Museum, Oberlin
- Website: oberlin.edu

Saint Sebastian Tended by Irene is an oil-on-canvas painting by Hendrick ter Brugghen dated to 1625. Now in the Allen Memorial Art Museum of Oberlin, Ohio, the piece depicts the Roman Catholic subject of Saint Sebastian Tended by Saint Irene, after Irene of Rome and her maid rescued him following his attempted martyrdom by the Roman authorities. An exemplary piece of the Italianate Baroque tendency in Dutch Golden Age painting, the painting employs dramatic uses of light and skillful chiaroscuro to depict its religious subject, evidence of influence from Caravaggio and ter Brugghen's fellow Utrecht Caravaggisti.

It was described by Seymour Slive as ter Brugghen's "masterpiece": "the large, full, forms of the group have been knit together into a magnificent design, and what could have been hard and sculptural is remarkably softened by the soft, silvery light which plays over Sebastian's half-dead, olive-grey body as well as the reds, creamy whites, and plum colours worn by the women who tend the saint".

== Provenance ==
The piece is recorded in the collection of Pieter Eris in Amsterdam during the 1660s. Its full provenance remains speculation; perhaps it was intended for a charitable institution where the sick were cared for, such as those with the plague which became prevalent in the Netherlands around the 1600s. Others supposed it was intended for a hidden church or private chapel, and then later reached the art market. It has also been suggested that the painting was commissioned by a schutterij (militia company) though this idea has generally been dismissed. It seems most likely to have been commissioned by Catholics, as the subject is virtually specific to Counter-Reformation art, though ter Brugghen was himself Protestant. The painting eventually found its way to a Frederick Mont, from whom the painting was purchased by Oberlin College in 1953. The piece has been exhibited in the Washington, D.C.'s National Gallery of Art, Utrecht's Centraal Museum and New York's Metropolitan Museum of Art.

Saint Sebastian Tended by Saint Irene was a mainly 17th-century subject, though found in predella scenes as early as the 15th century. It was painted by Georges de La Tour, Trophime Bigot (four times), Jusepe de Ribera, and others. It may have been a deliberate attempt by the Church to get away from the usual single nude treatment of the subject, which is already recorded in Vasari as sometimes arousing inappropriate thoughts among female churchgoers. The Baroque artists usually treated it as a nocturnal chiaroscuro scene, illuminated by a single candle, torch or lantern, in the style fashionable in the first half of the 17th century, and typically set it in an interior, after Sebastian has been carried away. Ter Brugghen's outside setting and choice of the earlier moment are unusual, though shared by the treatment of the subject by Dirck van Baburen.

== Subject ==
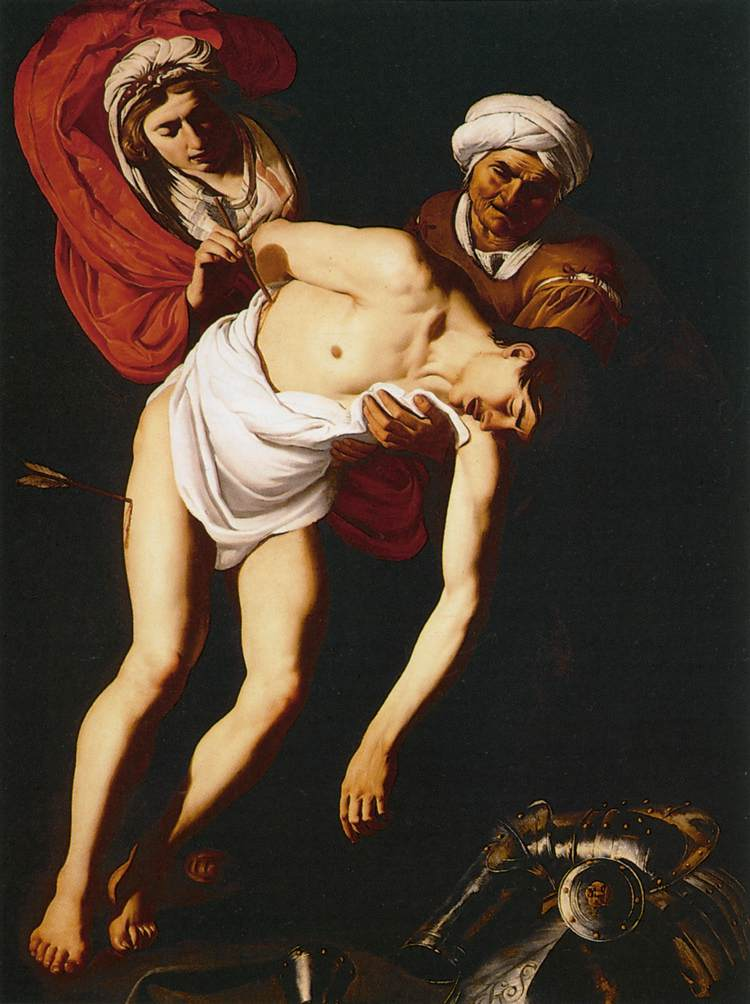
Saint Sebastian Tended by Saint Irene and her Maid by Dirck van Baburen. Oil on canvas. 1615. Museo Thyssen-Bornemisza, Madrid.

This painting depicts Sebastian, slumped in pain as he is tended to by Saint Irene and her maid. According to the traditional story, the Emperor Diocletian, in the Diocletianic Persecution, has the soldier Sebastian shot by archers as punishment for his treason. Looking for his body to bury, Irene found Saint Sebastian tied to a tree and miraculously alive, then nursed him back to health. Rather than painting the scene of Sebastian being shot with arrows, in the midst of his attempted execution, ter Brugghen chooses to show the moments afterwards where Irene and her maid untie him from the tree. Some attribute this narrative shift to the emergence of the plague within Utrecht in the 1620s: several artists desiring a subject saved from agony, turn to painting the rescue of the Catholicism's personification of suffering. Ter Brugghen depicts Sebastian with a sickly green pallor, his limp body lying in suffering and resembling much of the diseased or dead one would encounter in Utrecht at the time.

== Formal elements ==
=== Composition ===
A diagonal line spans the length of the canvas from the top left corner to the bottom right. It stretches down Saint Sebastian's tense arm, across his body and down to his feet, an arrow protruding from the center of his chest continuing the form. Sebastian's lifeless right hand in the air forms a triangular shape at one end of the line with the hands of Irene's maid, at balance with Sebastian's feet and left hand that touches the ground in the opposite corner. At the apex is Irene and Sebastian's faces in the foreground, turned away from each other with their positions juxtaposed, highlighting their symbolic relationship and them as the painting's prime focus. Irene's upturned face toward the source of light, graced with a gentle smile, furnishes her with a sense of hope and rescue. It stands in contrast to Sebastian's head, stricken with anguish as his expression is cast in shadow. The heads of the figures create a "pyramidal form", echoing the arrangement of trios prominent in the piece.

=== Iconography ===
Irene's curved form faces away from the lone tree in the background, distantly resembling a crucifixion, counterbalancing Sebastian's arching back and posterior. The opposition of these figures is also highlighted by an arrow that protrudes from his leg. Sebastian rests upon the most vivid object in the piece: a bright red fabric adorned in gold, often used symbolically by Caravaggisti like ter Brugghen to symbolize the Blood of Christ and martyrdom. The tree in the background contrasts the thick tree of the group, its slender and seemingly flimsy form highlighting the tragic ambiance. The consistent use of groups of three, whether it be the three heads in a formation, the trio of the maid's hands and Sebastian's hand, the leaves of the distant forlorn tree in the background or simply the subject of three biblical figures is symbolic of the Holy Trinity.

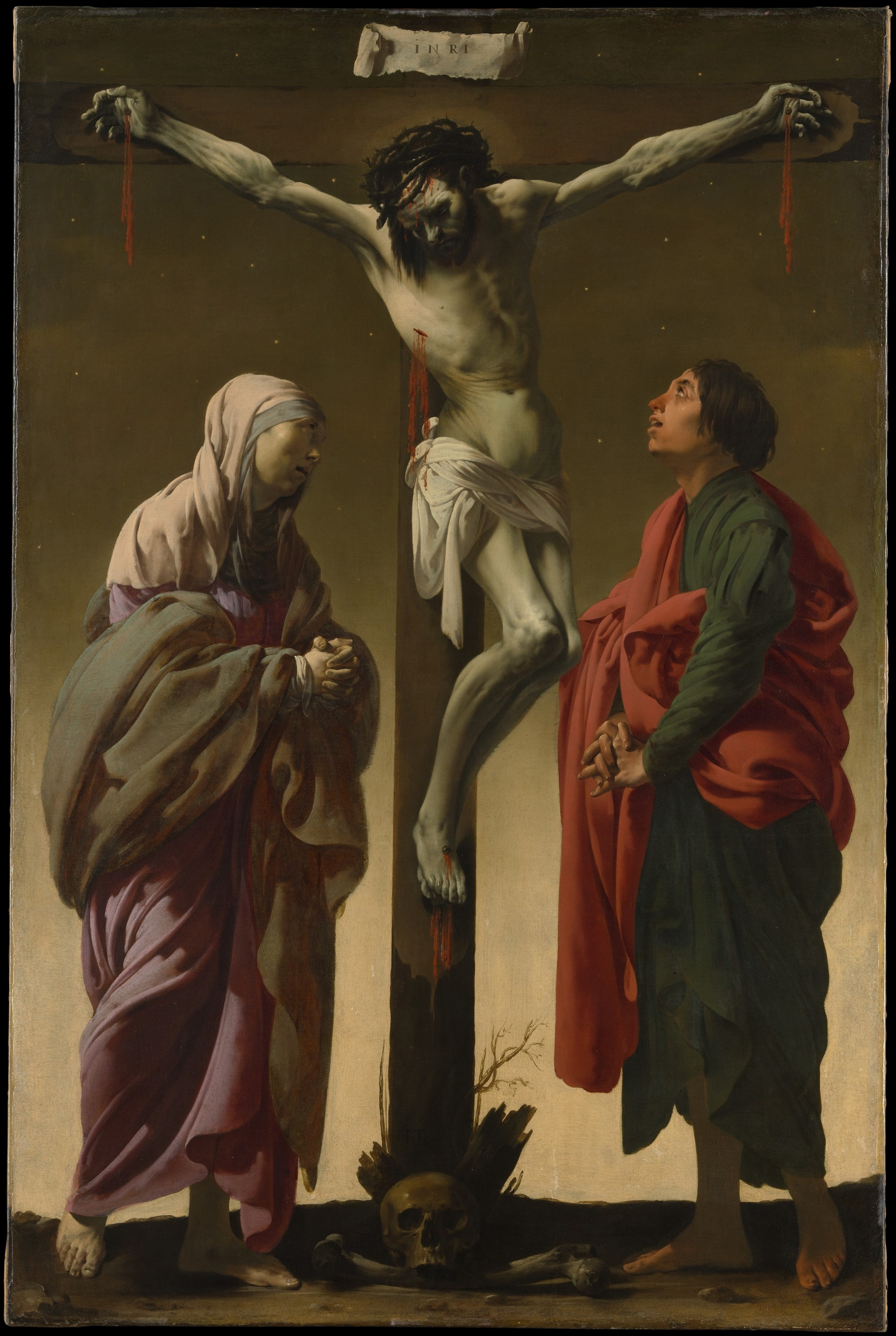
Crucifixion with the Virgin and St John by Hendrick ter Brugghen. Oil on canvas. 1625. The Metropolitan Museum of Art, New York City.

Ter Brugghen subtly imbues the association of the figures in this piece through both disparity and similarity of their hands. Sebastian's left hand, free of bondage, lies limp and obscured from view, symbolic of his unattainable relief from pain and lack of freedom. Irene's left hand rests on his chest, above his heart and provides support in a benevolent embrace, forming their relationship in the composition as one who tends to the other in suffering. The triangular form in the top left corner represents the connection between the maid and Sebastian; as Stechow describes it, "…the lifeless flesh of Sebastian's right hand yields to the pressure of the rope while the left hand of Irene's servant reacts to the same pressure with lively resilience." The servant's right hand is pulling on the tight ropes on Sebastian's wrist, attempting to undo them. She touches her forefinger and thumb together, the same gesture Irene uses with her right hand to pull an arrow from Sebastian's lower torso. Together, these two women parallel each other in hand gesture and action, both trying to remove a source of Sebastian's pain.

== Interpretation ==
Had this painting been truly intended for an institution dedicated to healing the sick and afflicted with plague or hidden church, it is interesting to see how ter Brugghen constructs this composition for its audience. Dramatic lighting cast from the upper left corner of the painting and subtle use of iconography such as the tree in the background, symbolic of a crucifixion, delicately suggests the presence of God, perhaps observing the rescue from above. Further stylistic choices made by ter Brugghen—such as the juxtaposition of the maid's hands and Sebastian's or the pallor of Sebastian's skin compared to the lively tones of the maid's—introduce themes of hope, strength and endurance in the face of despair, as well as alleviation to the afflicted whether in the form of recovery or entrance into heaven. Combining these themes in such a way that is exhibited in ter Brugghen's Saint Sebastian Tended by Saint Irene subtlety demonstrates clear consideration for its original intended destination: the plague afflicted, facing their impending mortality. Victims seeking relief and comfort would look upon ter Brugghen's painting, finding likeness in Sebastian's sickly pallor as he is alleviated from affliction and perhaps encounter respite or be invoked to religious worship.

== Comparisons ==
Painted the same year, ter Brugghen's Crucifixion with the Virgin and St John is accepted to be very similar in stylistic features and perhaps intended for the same destination as Saint Sebastian Tended by Irene. The archaic style of the Christ on the crucifix recalls old Netherland styles but remains in contrast to the more contemporary Mary and John, creating a piece where "Ter Brugghen rejects the ahistorical for the meta-historical." A stronger connection is also made between the two paintings based on the similarities between the Crucifixion's Saint John and Sebastian in Saint Sebastian, believed to be the same model.

Dirck van Baburen, another Utrecht Caravaggisti who once shared a studio with ter Brugghen, painted his own rendition of Saint Irene tending to the shot Sebastian a decade earlier. The two paintings share a striking similarity of Sebastian slumping down to the right corner of the canvas, mouth agape as his face is downcast, held right above the breast. Most likely, this painting had the most influence on ter Brugghen envisioning the biblical scene.
