= Castulus =

3rd-century Christian martyr and saint

Saint Castulus
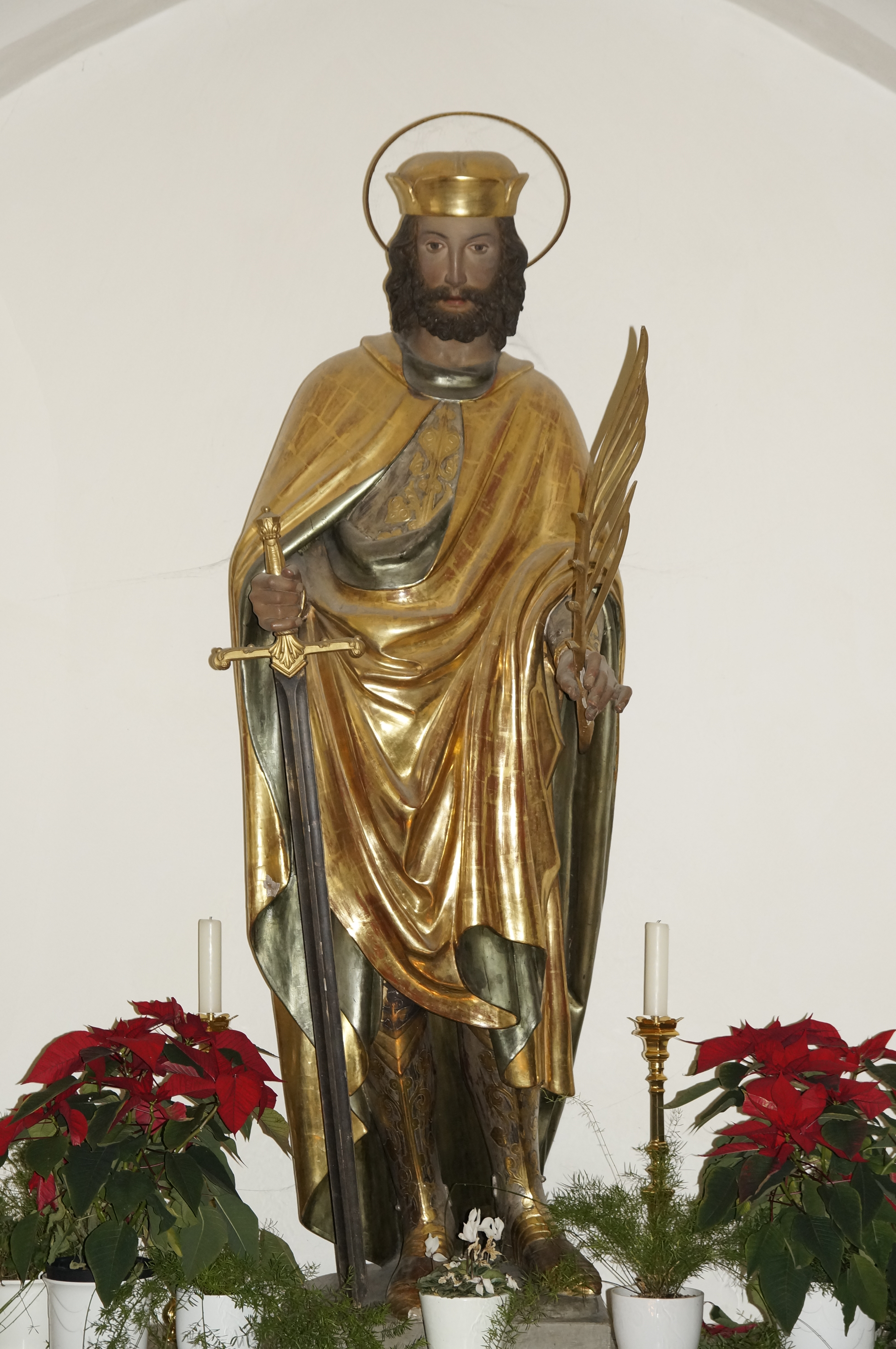
- St. Castulus statue at Moosburg

Martyr
- Died: 286 AD; Rome
- Venerated in: Catholic Church, Eastern Orthodox Church
- Feast: Catholic Church: March 26; March 27 (Freising, Munich). Eastern Orthodox Church: December 18
- Attributes: spade.
- Patronage: Shepherds; invoked against erysipelas, lightning, horse theft, wildfires, drowning, cowherds

Castulus (died 286) is venerated as a martyr and saint. According to tradition, he was the chamberlain (or officer, valet) of Emperor Diocletian and the husband of Irene of Rome.

== Biography ==
A convert to the Christian religion, he sheltered Christians in his home and arranged for religious services inside the palace of the emperor because it was the last place that Roman authorities would search. Among those he sheltered were Mark and Marcellian. He is one of the saints associated with the life and legend of Sebastian.

With his friend Tiburtius, he converted many men and woman to Christianity and brought them to Pope Caius to be baptized. He was betrayed by an apostate named Torquatus and taken before Fabian, prefect of the city.

Castulus was tortured and executed by being buried alive in a sand pit on the Via Labicana. According to tradition, Irene subsequently buried the body. She was later martyred herself, around 288 AD (Source unknown).

== Veneration ==
A church dedicated to Castulus at Rome, built on the site of his martyrdom, existed from at least the seventh century. Castulus was venerated in Bavaria after his relics were taken to Moosburg. Duke Henry the Lion started the construction of the Kastulus Minster in 1171.

In 1604, some relics were also brought to Landshut. His relics still rest in St. Martin's church, Landshut and in the Saint Castulus church, Prague.
