= Saint Sebastian Tended by Saint Irene (Georges de La Tour, Louvre) =

Painting by Georges de La Tour

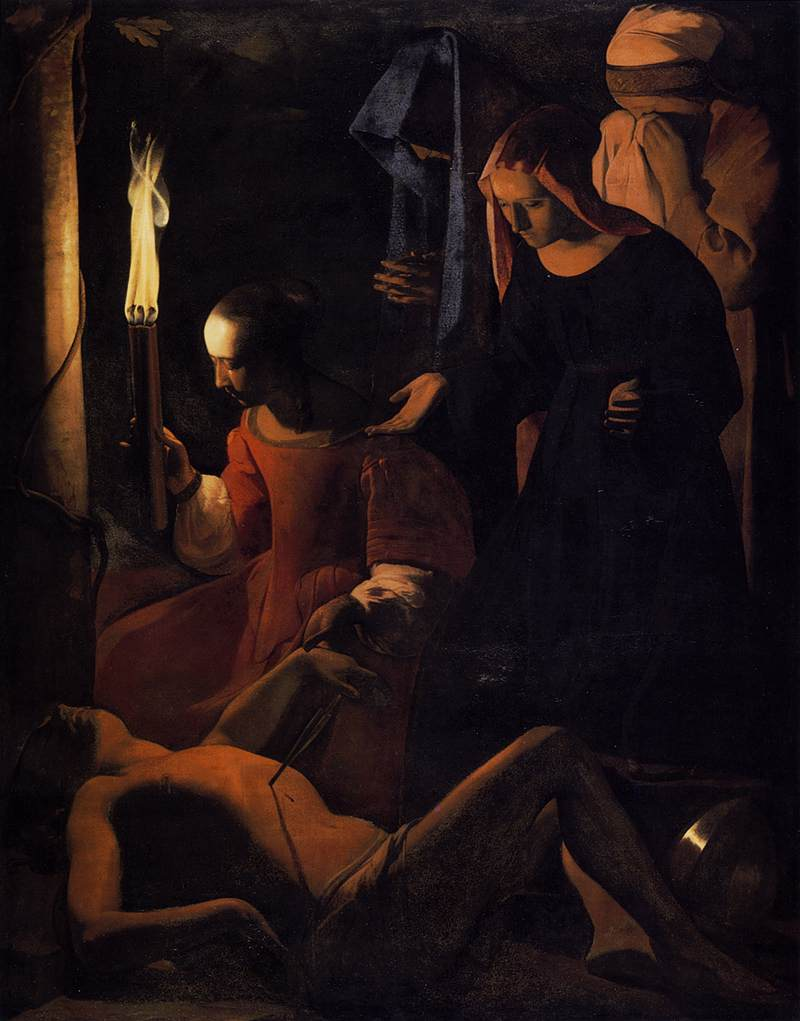
- Artist: Georges de La Tour
- Medium: oil on canvas
- Dimensions: 167 cm × 130 cm (66 in × 51 in)
- Location: Louvre, Paris

Saint Sebastian Tended by Saint Irene is a c.1649 oil-on-canvas painting by Georges de La Tour. It is one of the largest known paintings by the artist and his most ambitious composition. It was rediscovered in 1945 in the parish church of Bois-Anzeray and acquired by the Société des amis du Louvre for the Louvre in 1979 as inventory number R.F. 1979–53.

A second version is held in the Gemäldegalerie, Berlin – it was long held to be the original work until being compared with the Louvre work in 1972 at an exhibition of the artist's work at the Orangerie des Tuileries. The Berlin work is now considered to be a studio copy – Jacques Thuillier has attributed it to Georges' son Étienne de La Tour with retouching by Georges.

It is thought the painter sent the first version to Charles IV of Lorraine (1604–1675) in 1633, before painting a second version for Louis XIII, who liked it so much that he hung it alone in a room. A third version was also painted for the governor of Nancy in 1649. There are copies in Ruan, the chapel in Bois-Anzeray and the church in Broglie.
