= Trophime Bigot =

French painter

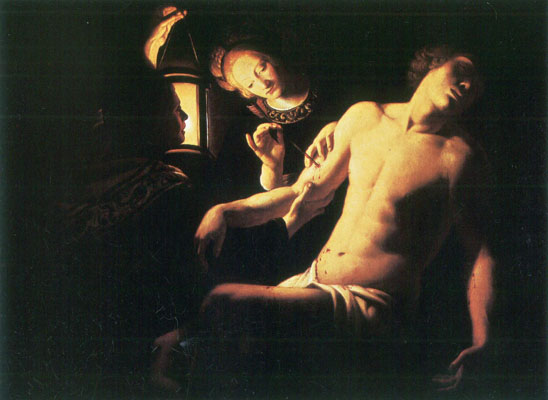
One of at least four versions of Saint Sebastian Tended by Saint Irene by Bigot

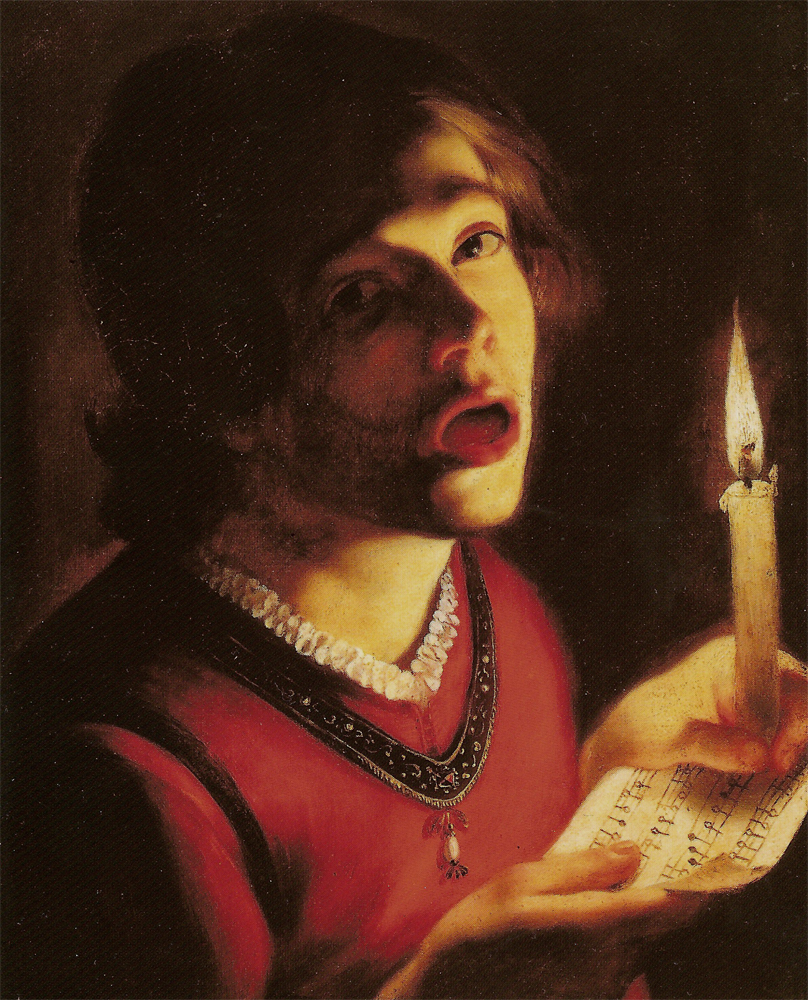
Singer with a Candle, Trophime Bigot. Galeria Doria Pamphili, Rome.

Trophime Bigot (English: /biːˈɡoʊ/ bee-GOH, French: [tʁɔfim biɡo]; 1579–1650), also known as Théophile Bigot, Teofili Trufemondi, the Candlelight Master (Maître à la Chandelle), was a French painter of the Baroque era, active in Rome and his native Provence.

Bigot was born in Arles in 1579, where he began his artistic career. Between 1620 and 1634, Bigot was in Italy, including Rome. He is known to have been in Arles in 1634, where he painted altarpieces of Saint Laurence Condemned to Torture and the Assumption of the Virgin) for local churches. Between 1638 and 1642, he lived in Aix-en-Provence, where he painted another Assumption. He returned to Arles in 1642, and divided his activities between there and Avignon, where he was buried in St Peter's church on February 21, 1650.

Only in the second half of the 20th century did it become generally accepted that Trophime Bigot, painter of altarpieces in the South of France, and the Candlelight Master, painter of intimate candle-lit scenes in Rome, were actually the same person.

== The "two Trophime Bigots" ==
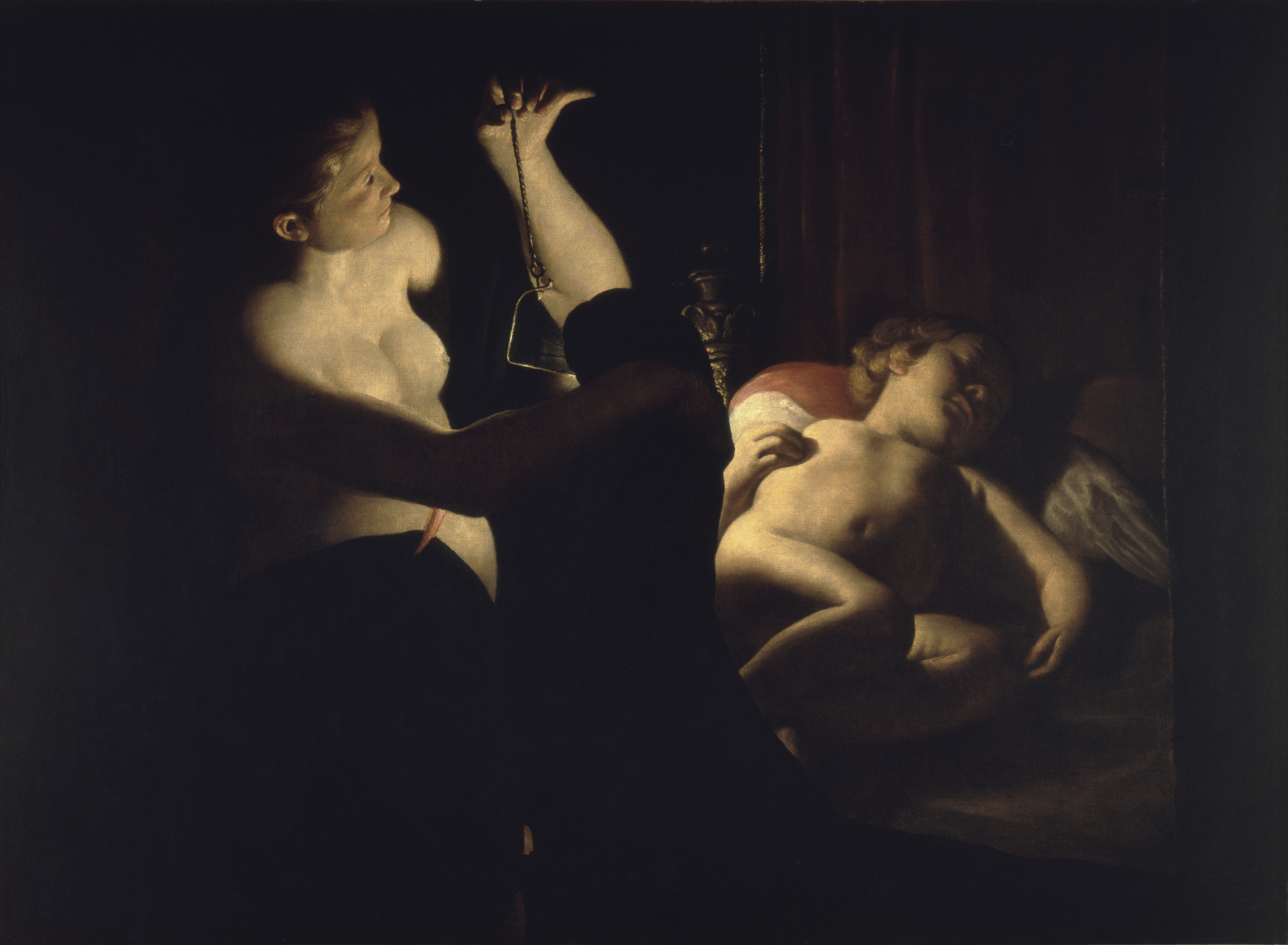
Cupid and Psyche, Museo Soumaya, Mexico City

Bigot has always been known from his documented altarpieces in Provence, but the English art historian Benedict Nicolson was the first to propose that he was identical with the artist called Maître à la chandelle (Candlelight Master), who was active in Rome, producing relatively small candle-lit scenes with heavy but subtle chiaroscuro in a style similar to that of Georges de La Tour. Nicolson connected a figure documented in Italy as variously Teofili Trufemondi/ Trofamonti/ Troffamondi/ Bigotti with this artist, and suggested these were Italian versions of Bigot's names. This theory was much discussed, and for a while many believed that there were two Trophime Bigots, father and son.

It is now generally accepted that the two artists were the same man, who painted in two different styles according to the different demands of the Roman and Provençal markets, “It seems, however, that Bigot was simply adapting to new circumstances.” and by 1988, after the discovery of new documents, Jean Boyer could assert that the single identity was "universally accepted" and the documents confirmed "beyond any doubt that there was only one French seventeenth-century painter called Trophime Bigot". The documents, from 1623 and concerning property left him by his father, record Bigot having left his affairs in the hands of a merchant friend in Arles while he was in Rome. A second document shows that he had no children known in Arles, as a cousin tried to claim the property after Bigot had not been heard of for some while, and was thought dead, at least by his cousin. Another document, from 1651, shows that Bigot had no family heirs after his death.

However acceptance of many of the attributions of Roman works to Bigot is notably lower in Italy; the Doria Pamphilj Gallery in Rome still attribute the boy with candle above to "Maestro Giacomo", and the National Gallery at Palazzo Barberini hang works attributed to Bigot and the Candlelight Master in the same room, with the assertion that the styles and lighting are different.

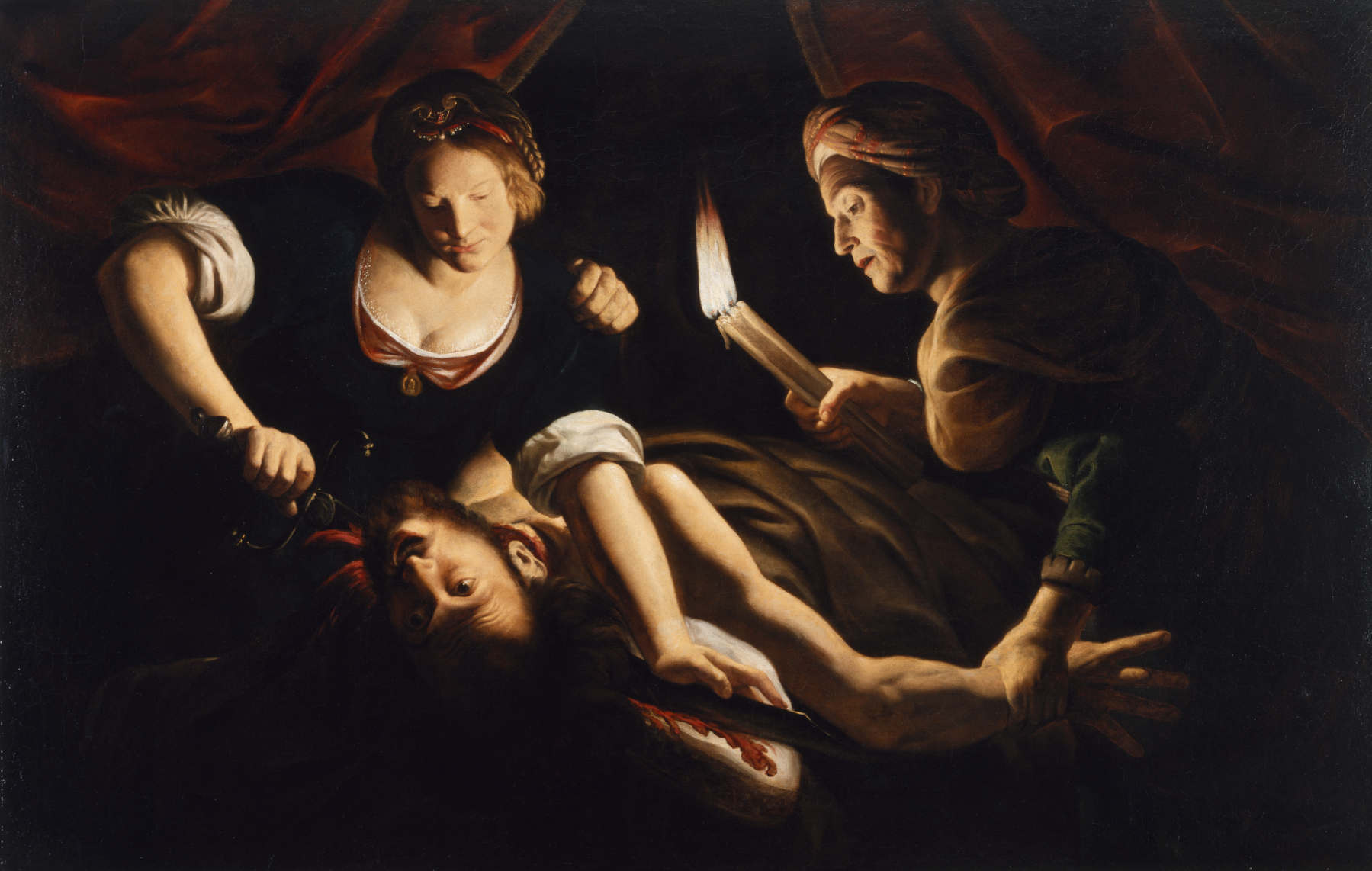
Bigot depicts Judith in serene determination as she cuts off the head of General Holofernes to save her people. The Walters Art Museum.

After he returned to France, Bigot produced altarpieces, at Arles and at Aix-en-Provence, that are in a very different and more conventional style from the Roman candle-lit works. In the Roman works the light-source is usually either a single candle, which for an extra softness of light is sometimes shown held in a bag-like paper, as in the works in Vienna and Bordeaux. As with de la Tour, the same subjects are often repeated in differing compositions, with many St Jeromes and at least four versions of St. Sebastian Aided by St. Irene: in Bordeaux, the Vatican Pinacoteca, Bob Jones University in South Carolina, and the Portland Art Museum in Oregon.

About 40 paintings, distributed amongst various museums, have been attributed to Bigot, among them:

- Saint Sebastian Tended by Saint Irene, Musée des Beaux-Arts de Bordeaux, with other versions in the Vatican Pinacoteca and two in the USA (Greenville with the Vatican composition).
- Vanity (Rome, Corsini Palace, Rome)
- Saint Jerome (Corsini Palace, Rome and other versions)
- Saint Laurence Condemned to Torture, altarpiece restored by the organization Monuments Historiques (Arles, Church of Saint-Césaire)
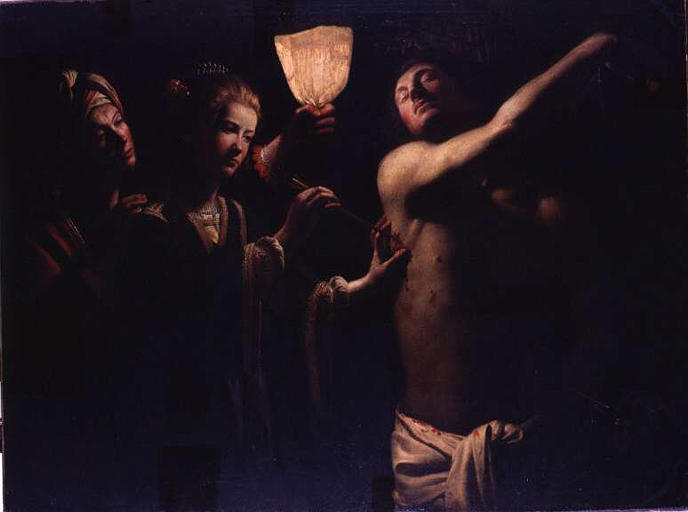
Saint Sebastian Tended by Saint Irene, ca. 1620–1634, Musée des Beaux-Arts de Bordeaux

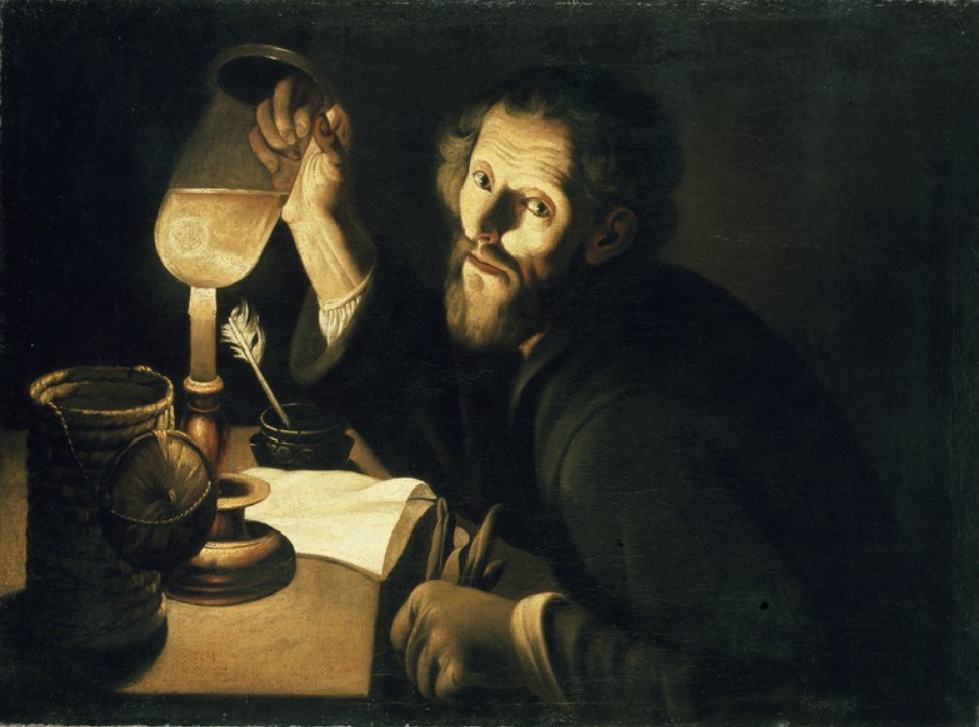
A Doctor Examining Urine, Ashmolean Museum, Oxford

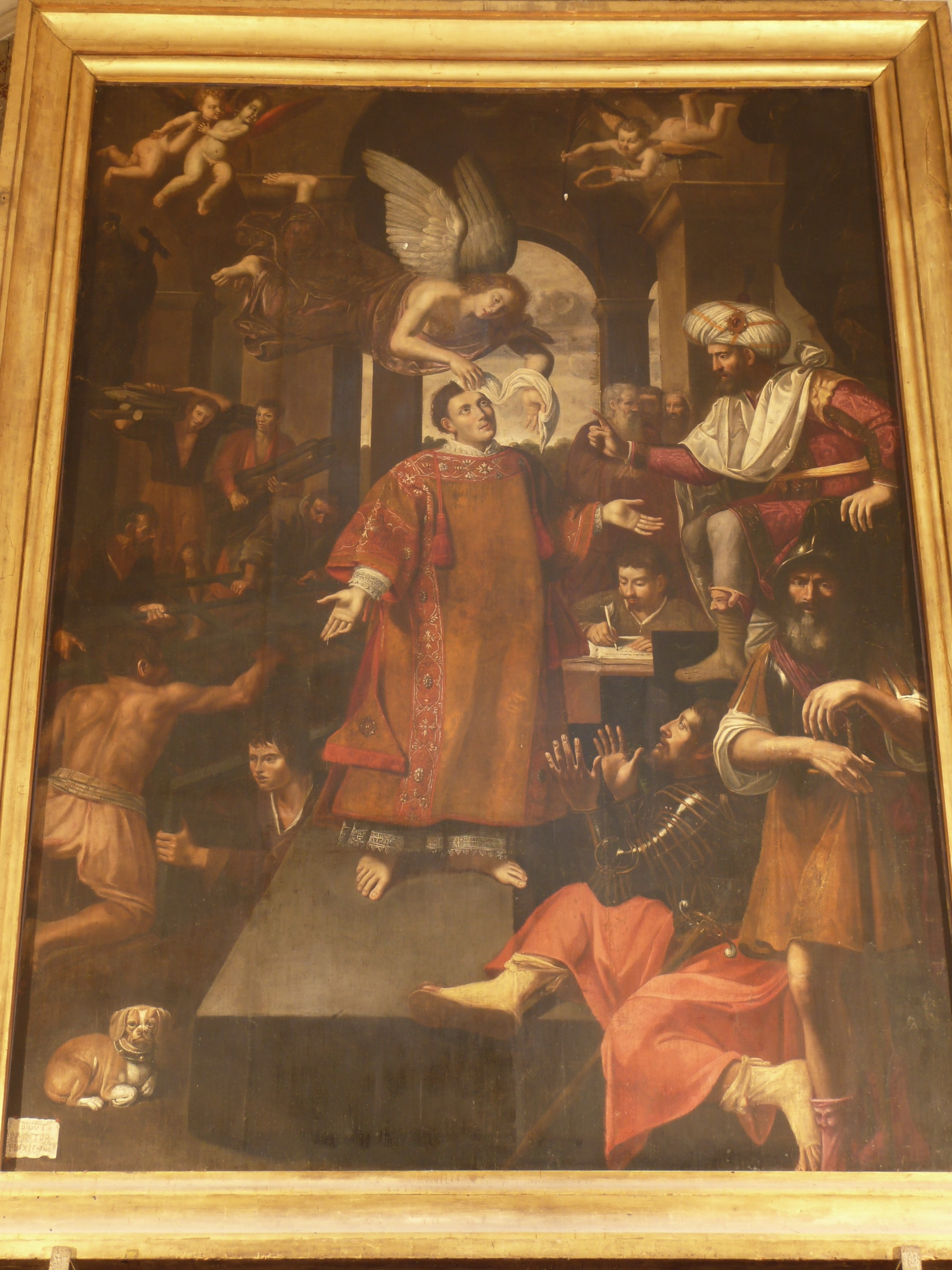
Saint Laurence Condemned to Torture, altarpiece in Arles, Church of Saint-Césaire, 1634
