= Irene of Rome =

3rd-century Catholic saint

Saint Irene of Rome
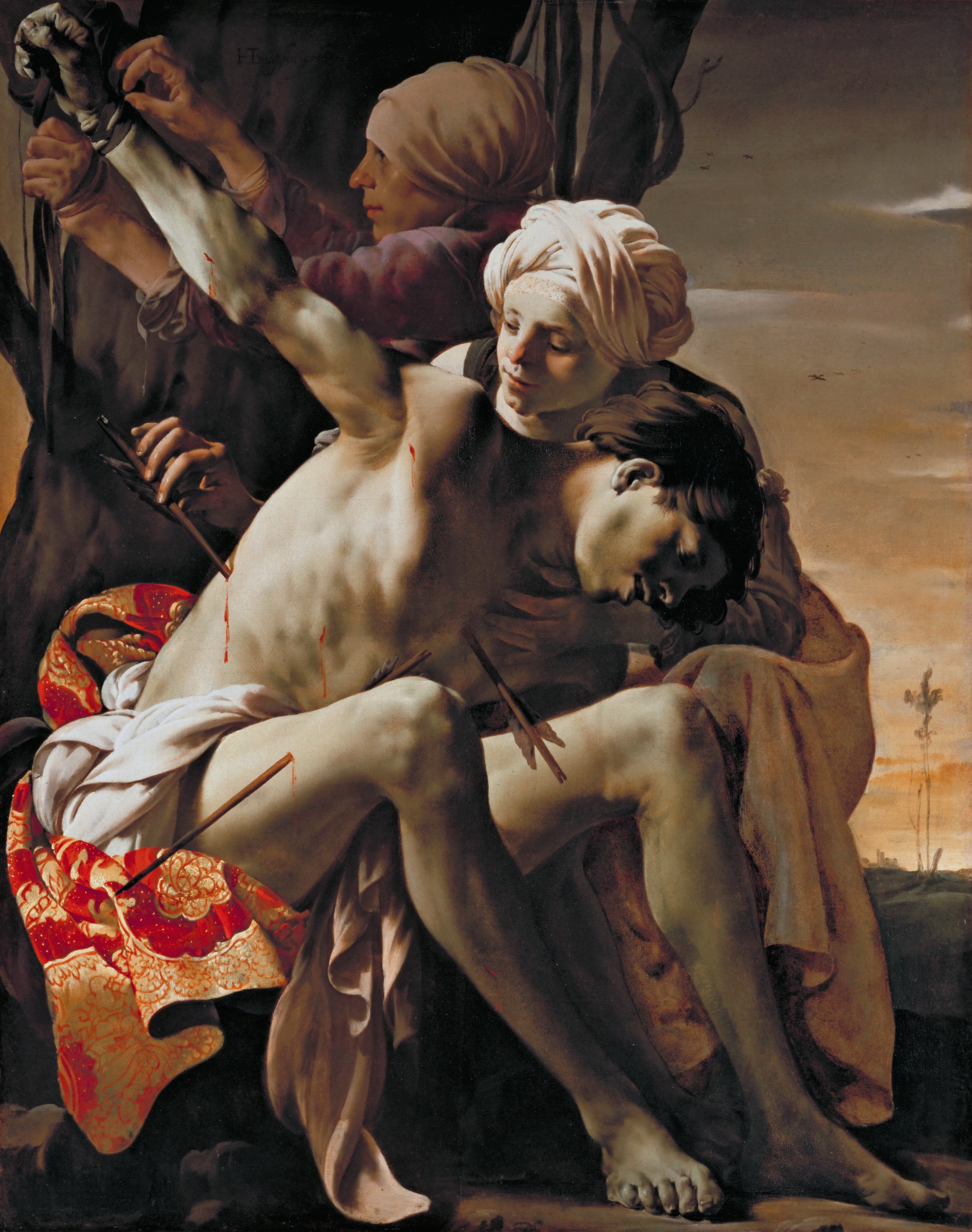
- Saint Sebastian Tended by Saint Irene. Hendrick Ter Brugghen
- Died: 288 AD; Rome
- Venerated in: Roman Catholic Church
- Feast: April 3
- Attributes: tending to Saint Sebastian

Saint Irene of Rome (died 288 AD) was a Christian woman in the Roman Empire during the reign of Diocletian. She was the wife of Saint Castulus. According to Christian legend, she attended to Saint Sebastian after he was wounded by Mauretanian archers.

== Biography ==
Irene was the wife of Saint Castulus who, according to tradition, was in the service of the Roman emperor. She was later widowed when Castulus was martyred for practicing Christianity and converting others to the religion. After the death of her husband, Irene continued to be active in the Christian community in Rome. According to hagiography, when Saint Sebastian was shot with arrows for practicing Christianity, Irene tended his wounds.

Saint Sebastian Tended by Saint Irene was the subject of many paintings by Benedetto Luti and others.

== Gallery ==
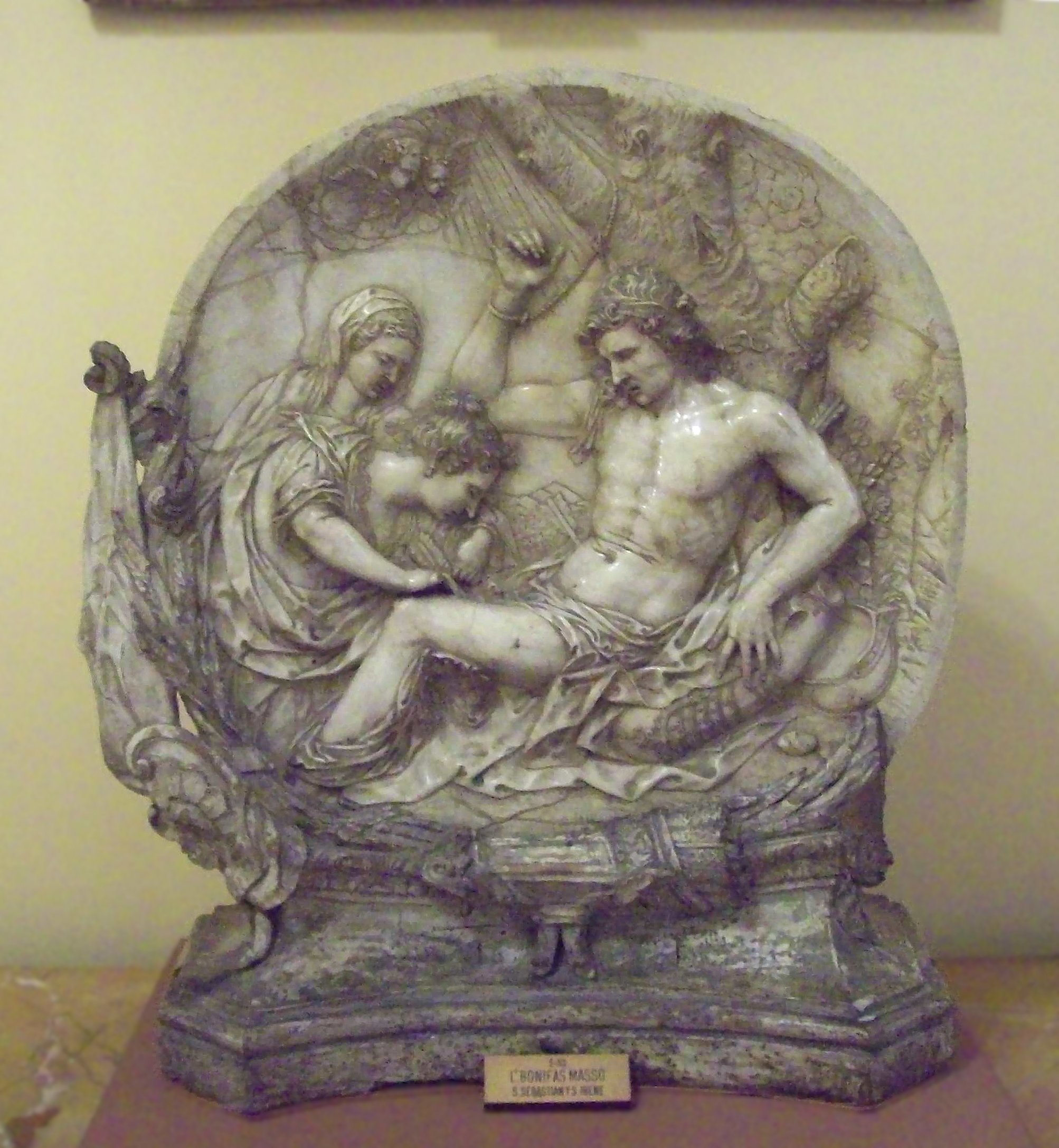
Baroque relief of Saint Irene curing Saint Sebastian's injuries.

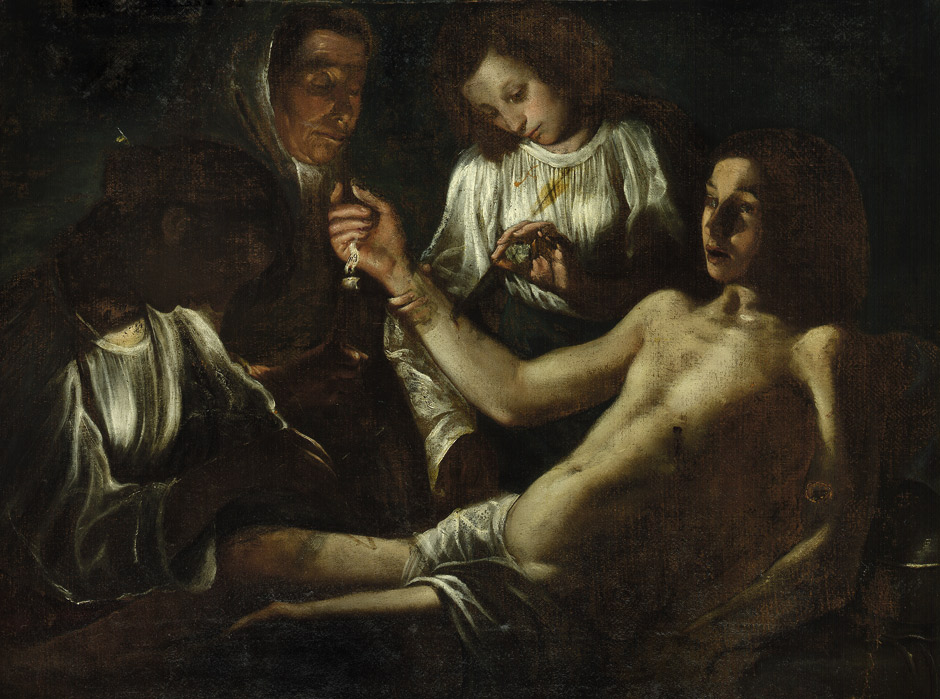
Irene of Rome and Saint Sebastian

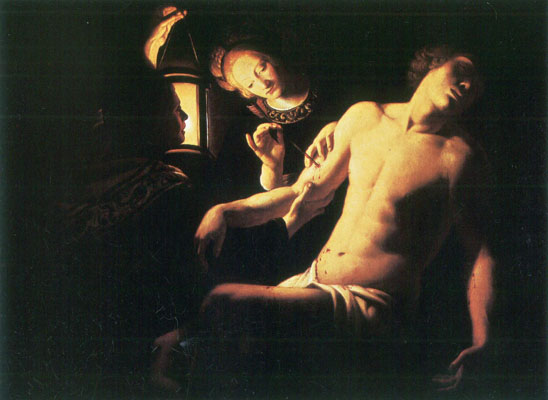
Trophime Bigot

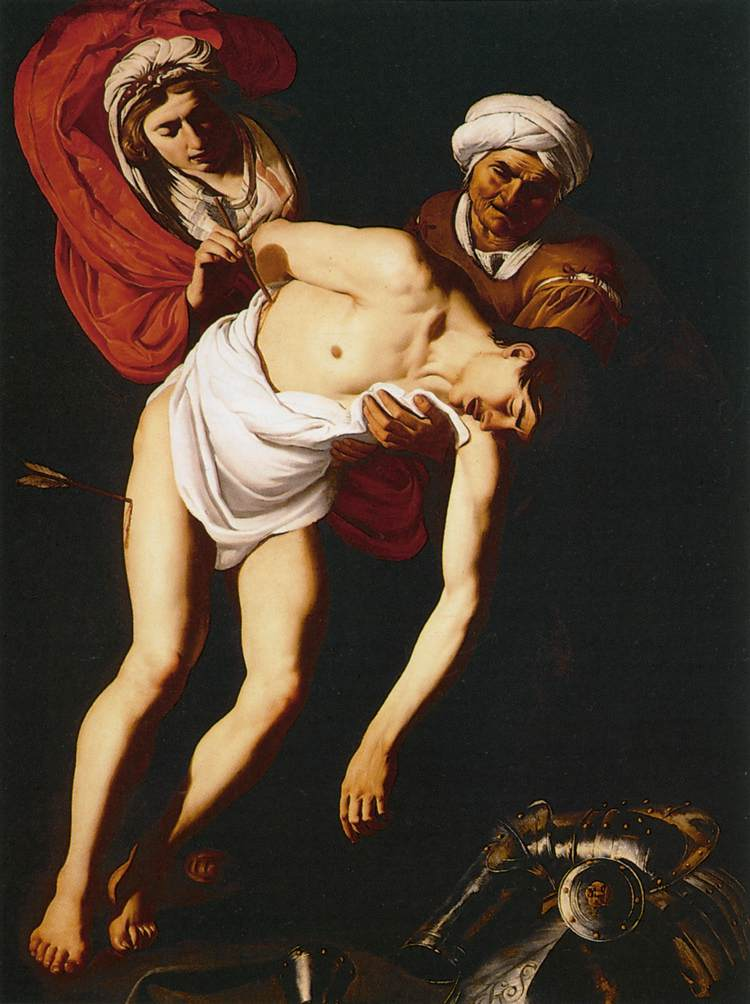
Dirck van Baburen, 1615

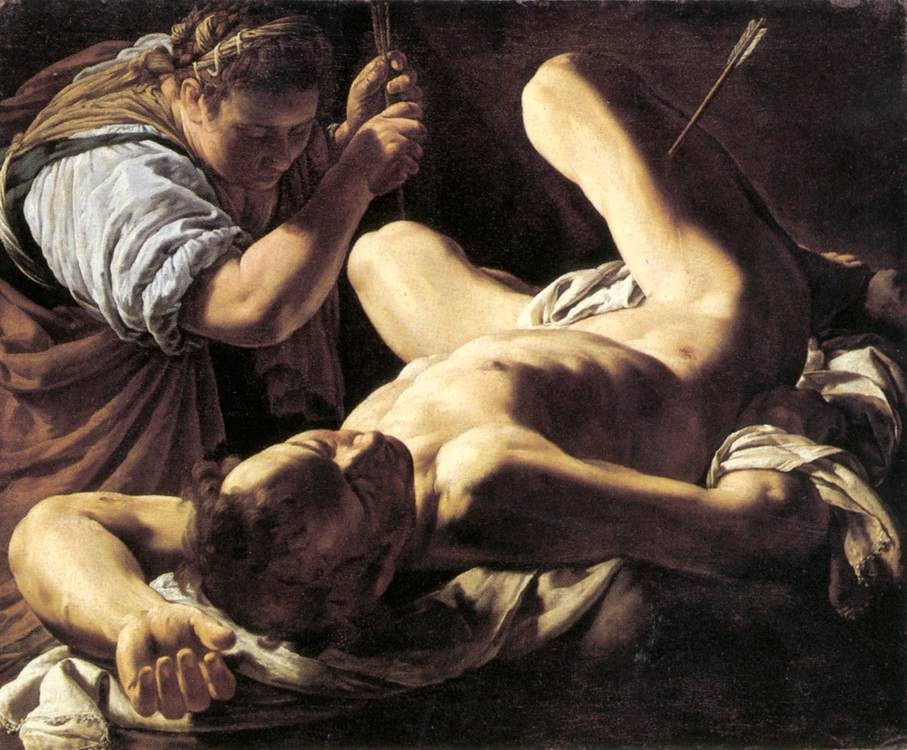
Marcantonio Bassetti -c.1620

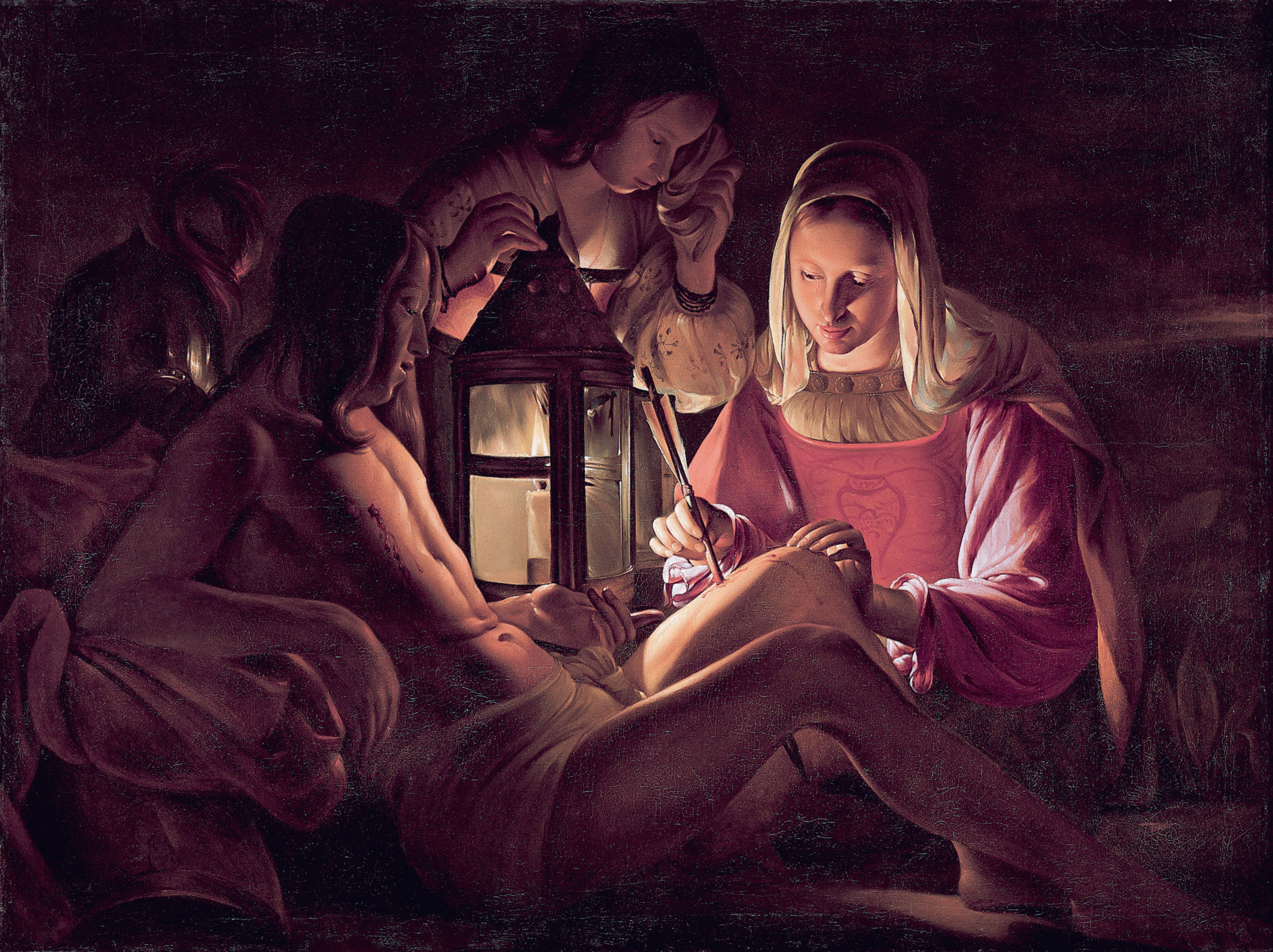
attributed to Georges de La Tour, early 1630s

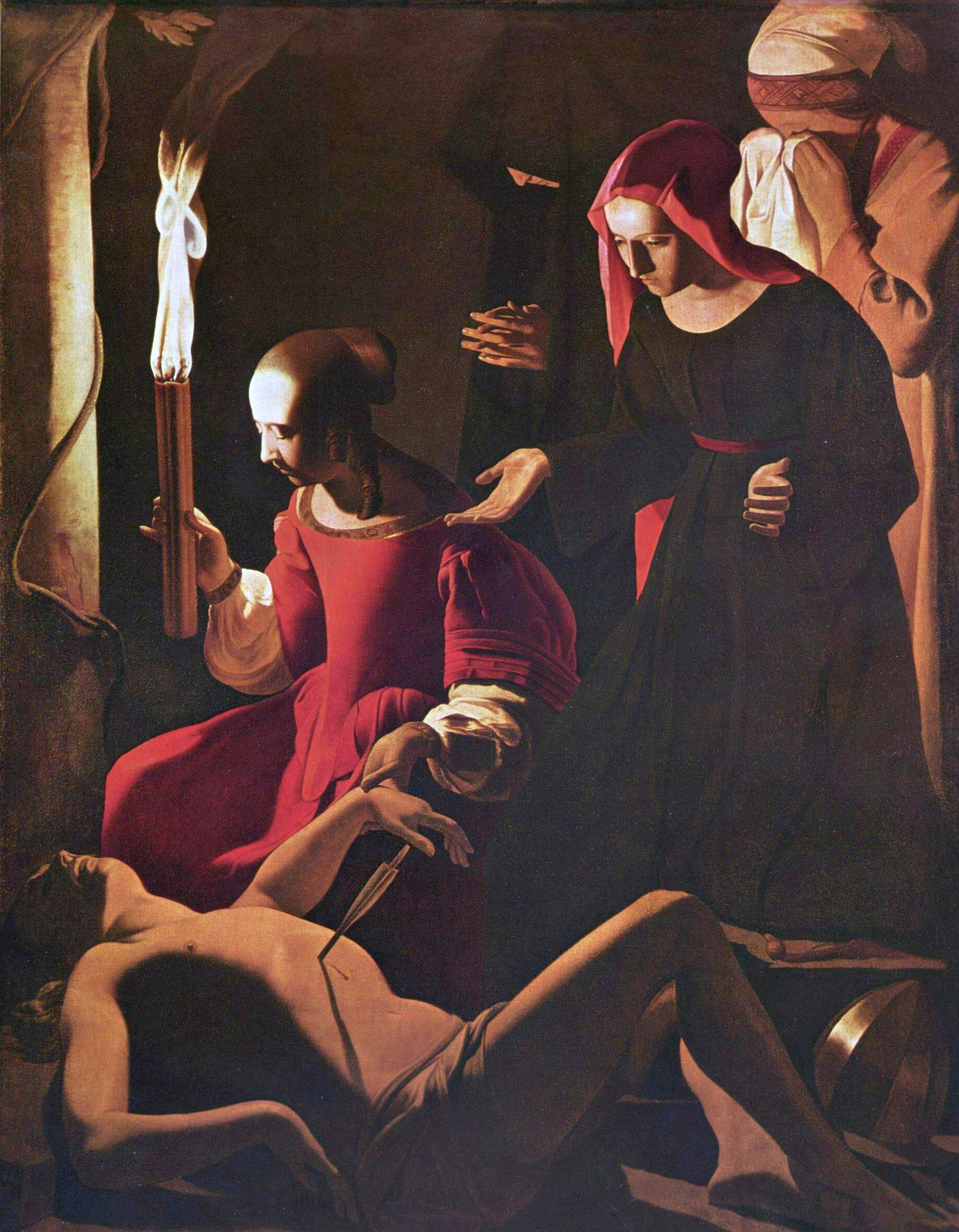
Georges de La Tour 1650

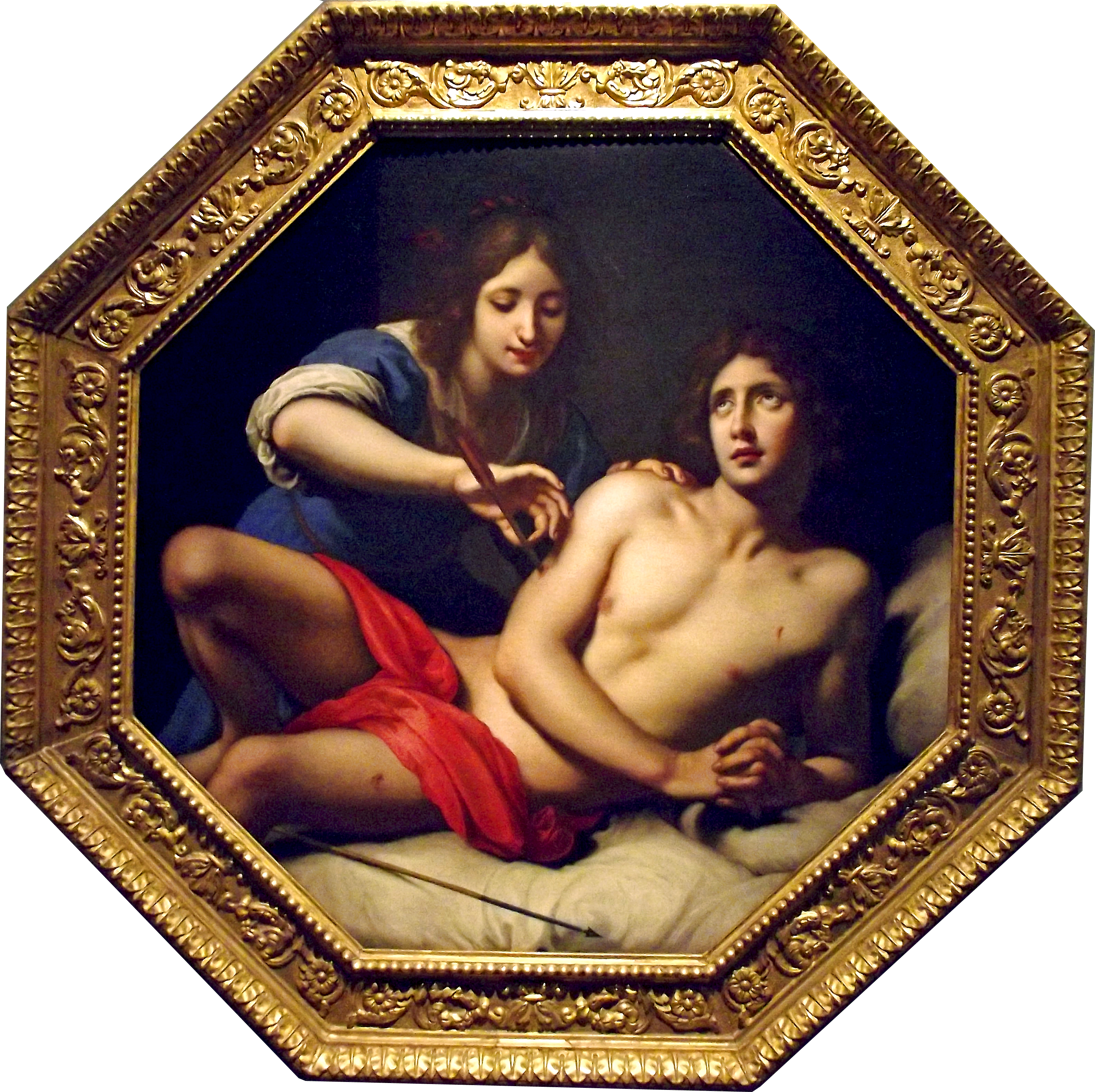
Felice Ficherelli -1650

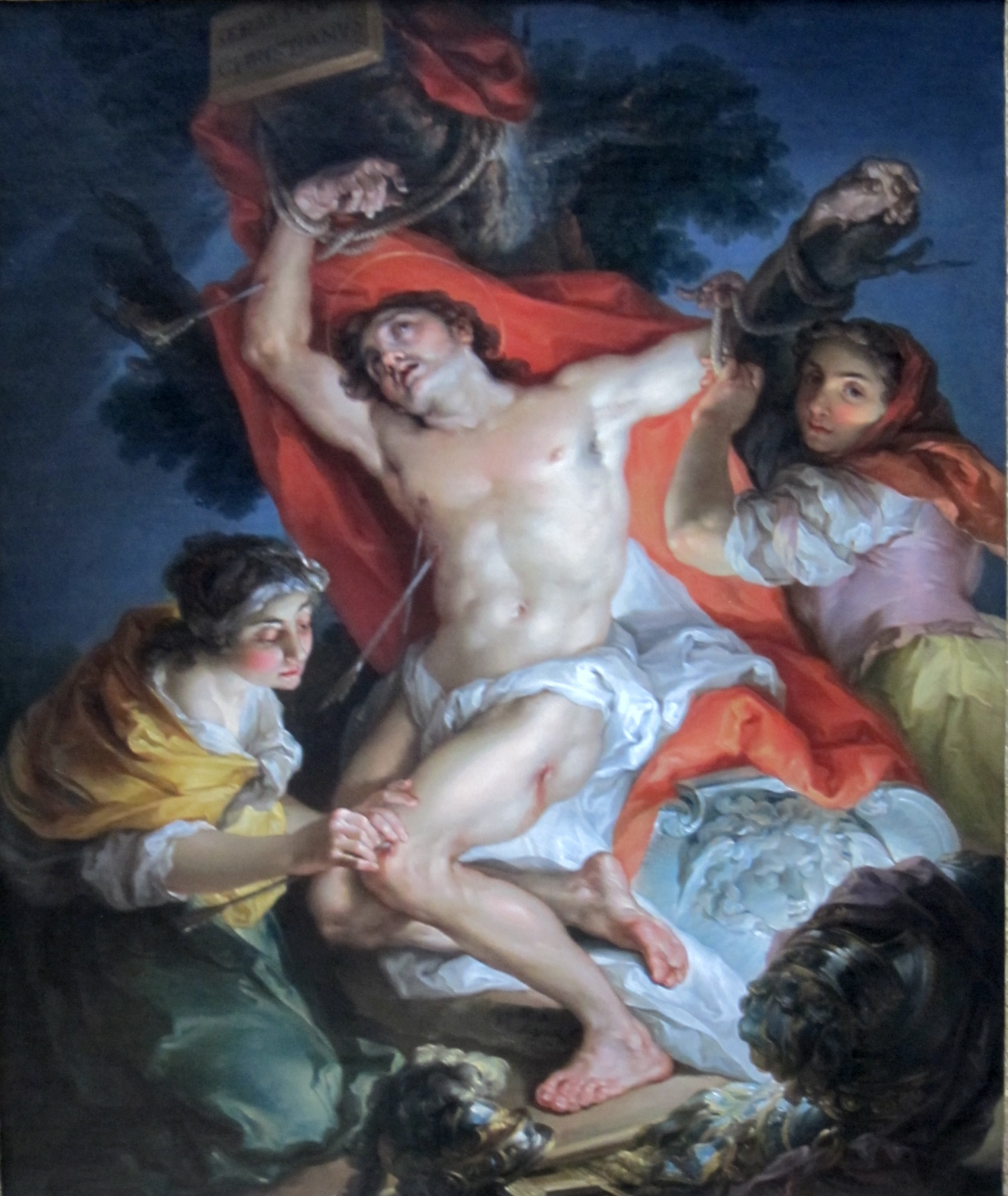
Vicente López y Portaña 1795-1800
