= Rénialme =

Prominent noblefamily

de Rénialme (also spelled de Renialme) was a prominent noble Belgian and Venetian family originally from Antwerp in modern Belgium. Several family members were wealthy merchants in Antwerp and Venice during the 16th century and later.

The family includes the noted art dealer Johannes de Renialme, a principal dealer of Rembrandt's paintings and who also bought the first known painting by Vermeer.
