= The Denial of Saint Peter (Hendrick ter Brugghen) =

Painting by Hendrick ter Brugghen

- De verloochening van Petrus (Dutch), Le reniement de saint Pierre (French)
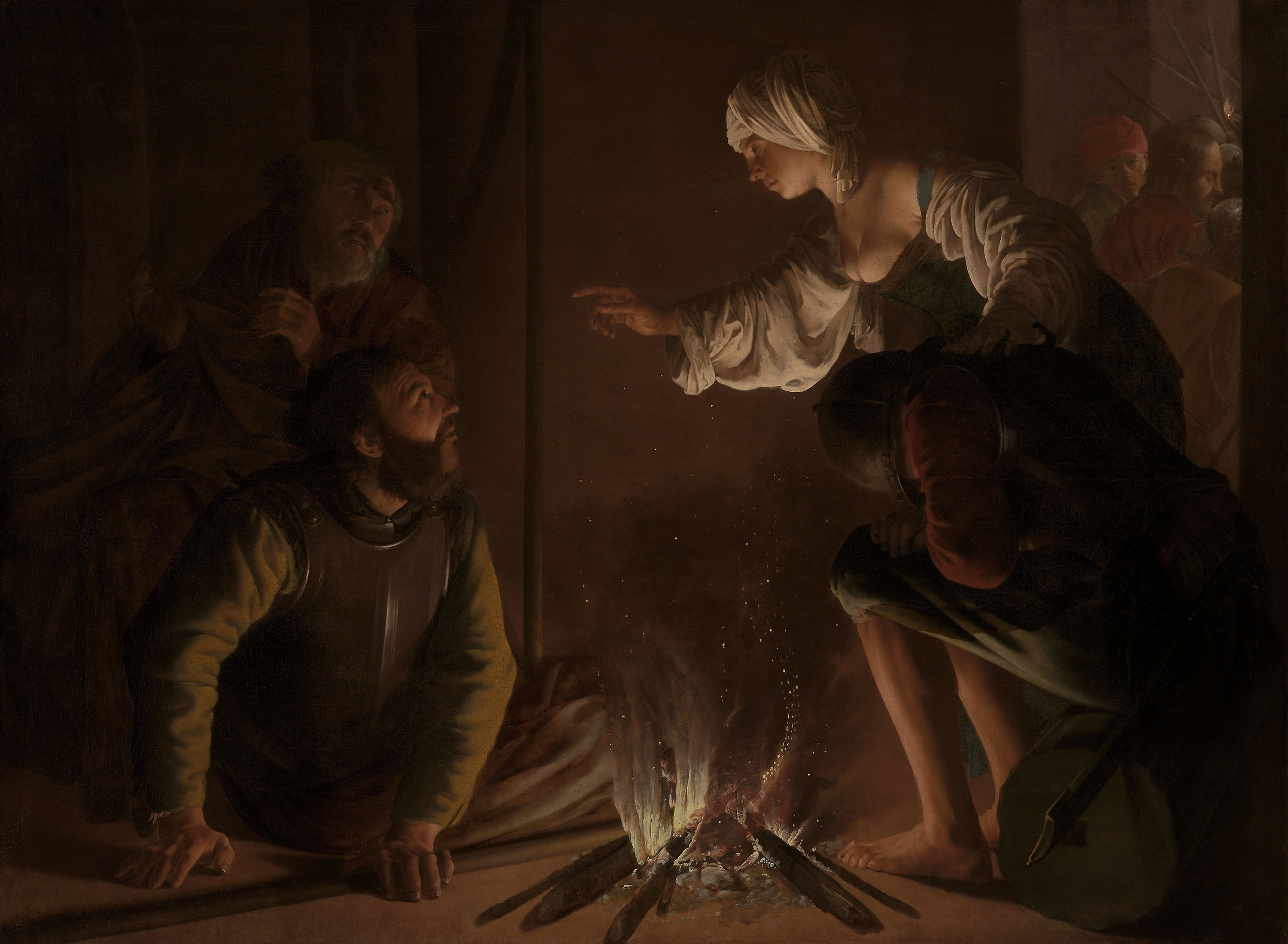
- Artist: Hendrick ter Brugghen
- Year: 1628
- Catalogue: A35, A30
- Medium: oil on canvas
- Subject: Denial of Peter
- Dimensions: 132.3 cm × 178 cm (52.1 in × 70 in)
- Location: Art Institute of Chicago; Chicago
- Accession: 1969.3
- Website: http://www.artic.edu/aic/collections/artwork/30901

The Denial of Saint Peter is a painting by Hendrick ter Brugghen, a member of the Dutch Caravaggisti, depicting Saint Peter's thrice denial of Christ as recounted in all four Gospels. It is thought to have been painted after 1625, and thus in the last three years of ter Brugghen's life; he died in 1629. The painting shows a marked departure from ter Brugghen's earlier painting in its emphasis on play of light, its baroque quality and a resolved sensibility.

== Composition ==
The painting depicts a scene from the Denial of Peter as specifically recounted in the Gospel of Luke chapter 22:

"And when they had kindled a fire in the midst of the hall, and were set down together, Peter sat down among them. But a certain maid beheld him as he sat by the fire, and earnestly looked upon him, and said, This man was also with him. And he denied him, saying, Woman, I know him not." Luke 22:55-57

The action takes place in an interior. Two soldiers are warming themselves around a fire, one evidently asleep, one rousing as a servant girl points at Saint Peter in the act of accusing him. He is cowering in the very left of the painting. Diametrically opposite and in a separate scene is Christ taken by soldiers. Their fence-like sticks echoes that of the soldier on the ground, the sticks in the fire, illuminating the scene, and the tent-pole or stick behind Peter and his accuser.

A figure stares out at the viewer from the scene of the taking of Christ. This scene is taken from Albrecht Dürer's Small Passion: Pilate Washing his Hands of 1512 where it is also used as a background motif and, in much the same way, implicates the viewer, through the staring soldier, in the foreground goings-on; there Pilate absolving himself, here Peter himself.

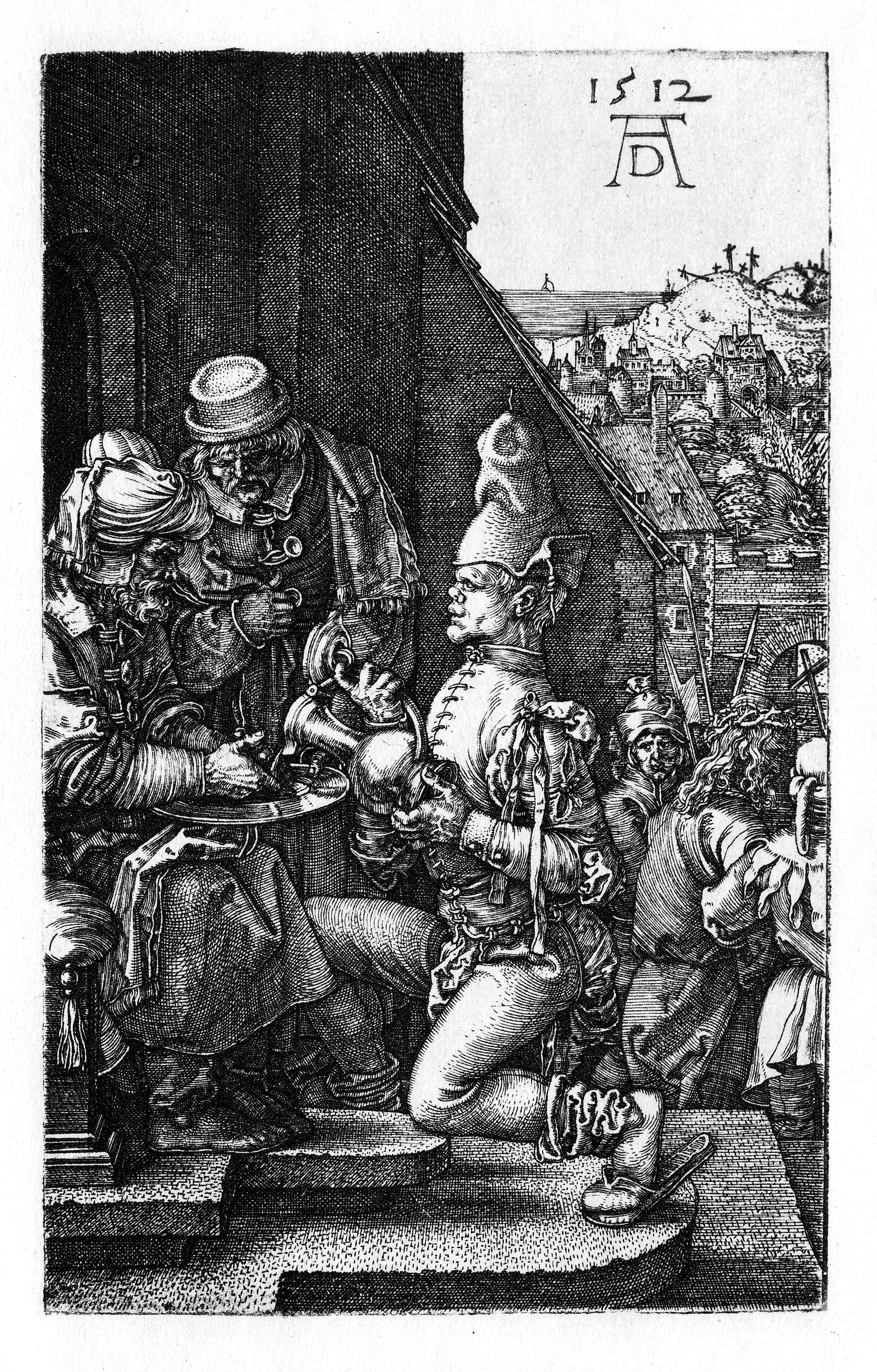
Albrecht Dürer, Pilate Washing his Hands, engraving on copper, 118 mm × 75 mm (4.6 in × 3.0 in), Metropolitan Museum of Art

A painting in the Shipley Art Gallery in Gateshead, Tyne and Wear, England, attributed to ter Brugghen, appropriates Dürer's composition directly and in reverse. This is again copied in another, nearly identical, painting by ter Brugghen in the National Museum of Lublin, Poland.

The soldier supporting himself on his hands, perhaps in the act of getting up, is similar to a semi-recumbent figure in the left foreground of Caravaggio's The Martyrdom of Saint Matthew installed in the Contarelli Chapel, Rome in July 1600; early enough for ter Brugghen to have known it during his sojourn in the Eternal City no later than 23 April 1607 when he is placed there by Utrecht records. The second soldier, to the right, is taken from The Resurrection of Christ from Albrecht Dürer's Small Passion.

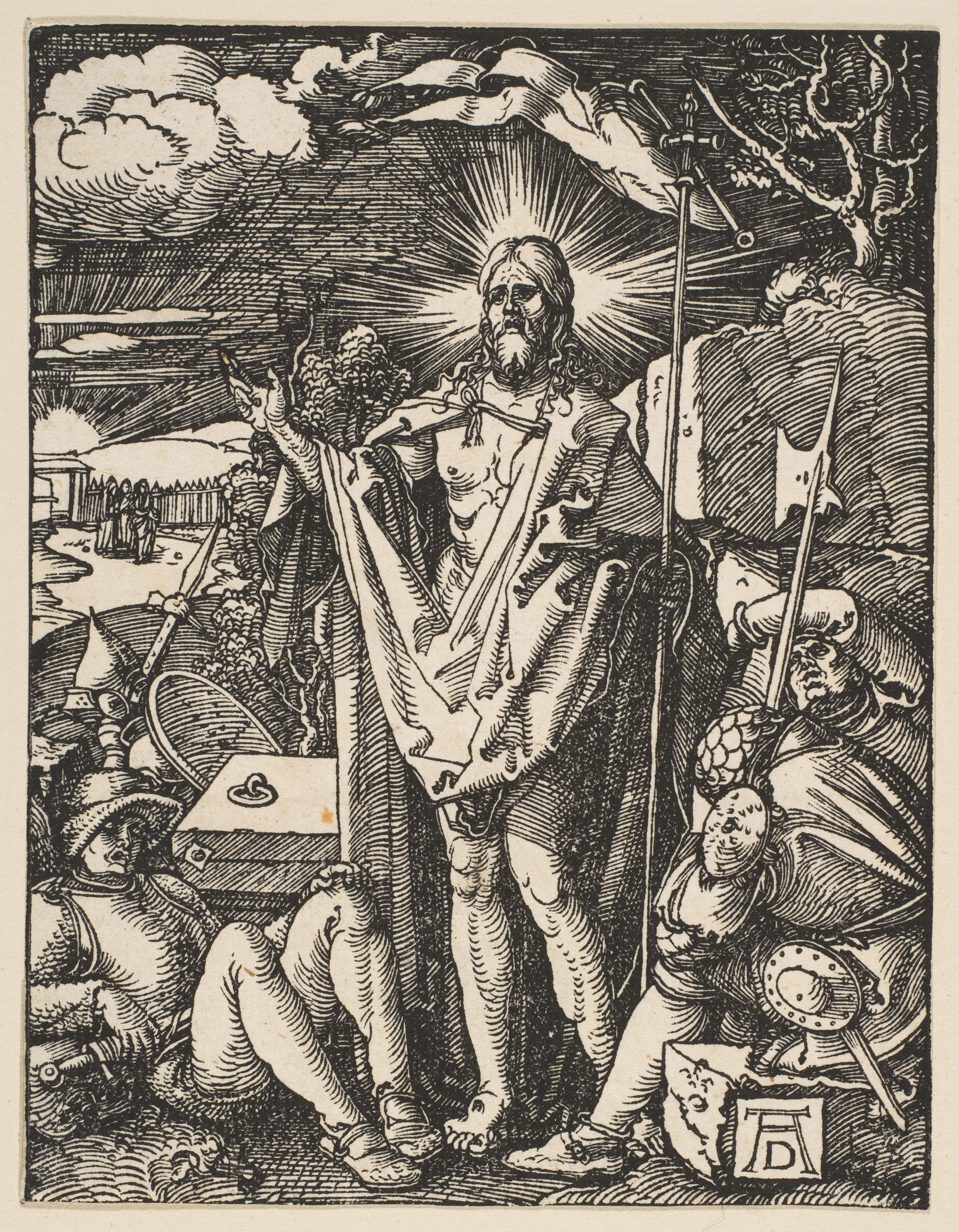
Albrecht Dürer, The Resurrection, woodcut, 12.7 cm × 9.8 cm (5.0 in × 3.9 in), Metropolitan Museum of Art

The figure of the maidservant has her closest parallel in a fragment of a Denial at Stourhead, where the accusing arm is modelled in the same manner. The female model appears elsewhere, in The Concert (about 1927), wearing a similar headdress and costume, and in Girl Blowing on a Firebrand (circa 1626–1627).

== Origins and provenance ==
Ter Brugghen's Denial has strong similarities in style to his The Liberation of Peter at the Staatliche Museum, Schwerin. Here the sparseness of the composition has done away altogether with the tradition of having two sleeping guards present. The picture is signed and dated 1629, the year ter Brugghen died, giving us an indication that Denial might also have been painted around this time.

The Art Institute of Chicago next finds the present painting in the collection of Reedtz-Thott, Guanø Castle near Næstved, Denmark, by about 1750. It was owned by Baron Kjeld Thor Tage Otto Reedtz-Thott (1839–1923), 2nd Baron Guanø by at least 1914, from whom it descended to Baron Axel Reedtz-Thott. He sold it to a London dealer in the late 1960s. By 1968, it was with Wildenstein & Co., New York and was purchased by the Chicago Institute in February 1969 from the Charles H. and Mary F. S. Worcester Collection.

== Referenced works ==
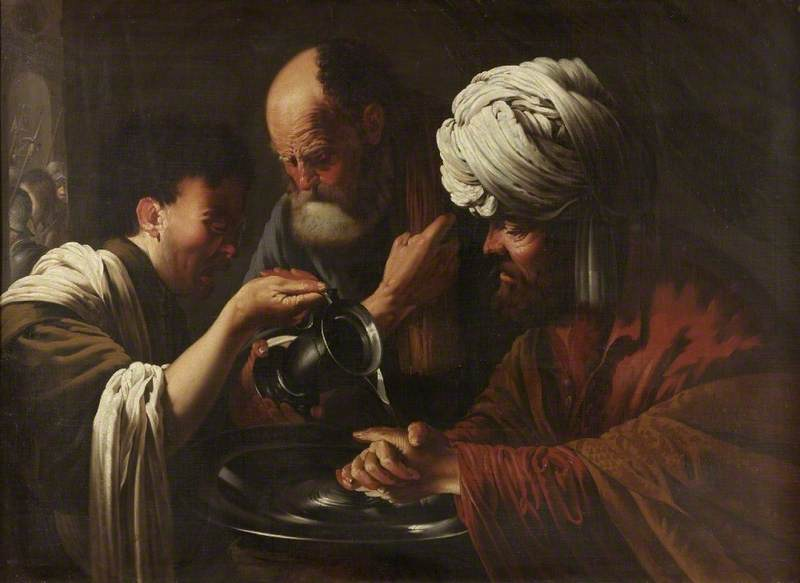
Pilate Washing his Hands, oil on canvas, 103 cm × 139 cm (41 in × 55 in), Shipley Art Gallery, England

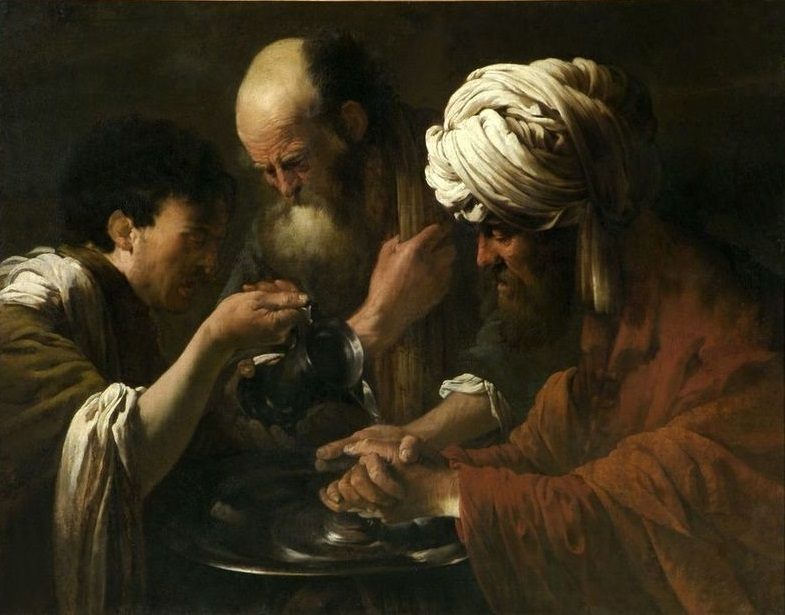
Pilate Washing his Hands, oil on canvas, 100 cm × 128 cm (39 in × 50 in), National Museum of Lublin, Poland

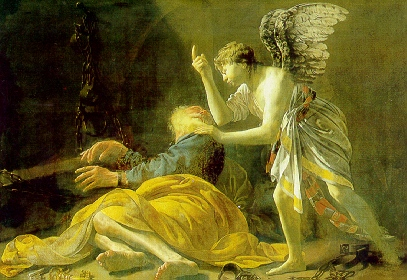
The Liberation of Saint Peter, oil on canvas, 152 cm × 210 cm (60 in × 83 in), Staatliche Museum, Schwerin

The Liberation of Saint Peter, oil on canvas, 152 cm × 210 cm (60 in × 83 in), Staatliche Museum, Schwerin

Caravaggio, The Martyrdom of Saint Matthew, oil on canvas, 323 cm × 343 cm (127 in × 135 in)

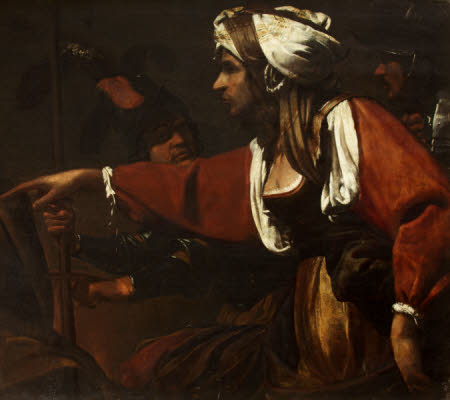
Maidservant from a Denial of Saint Peter (fragment), oil on canvas, 97.8 cm × 101.6 cm (38.5 in × 40.0 in), Stourhead

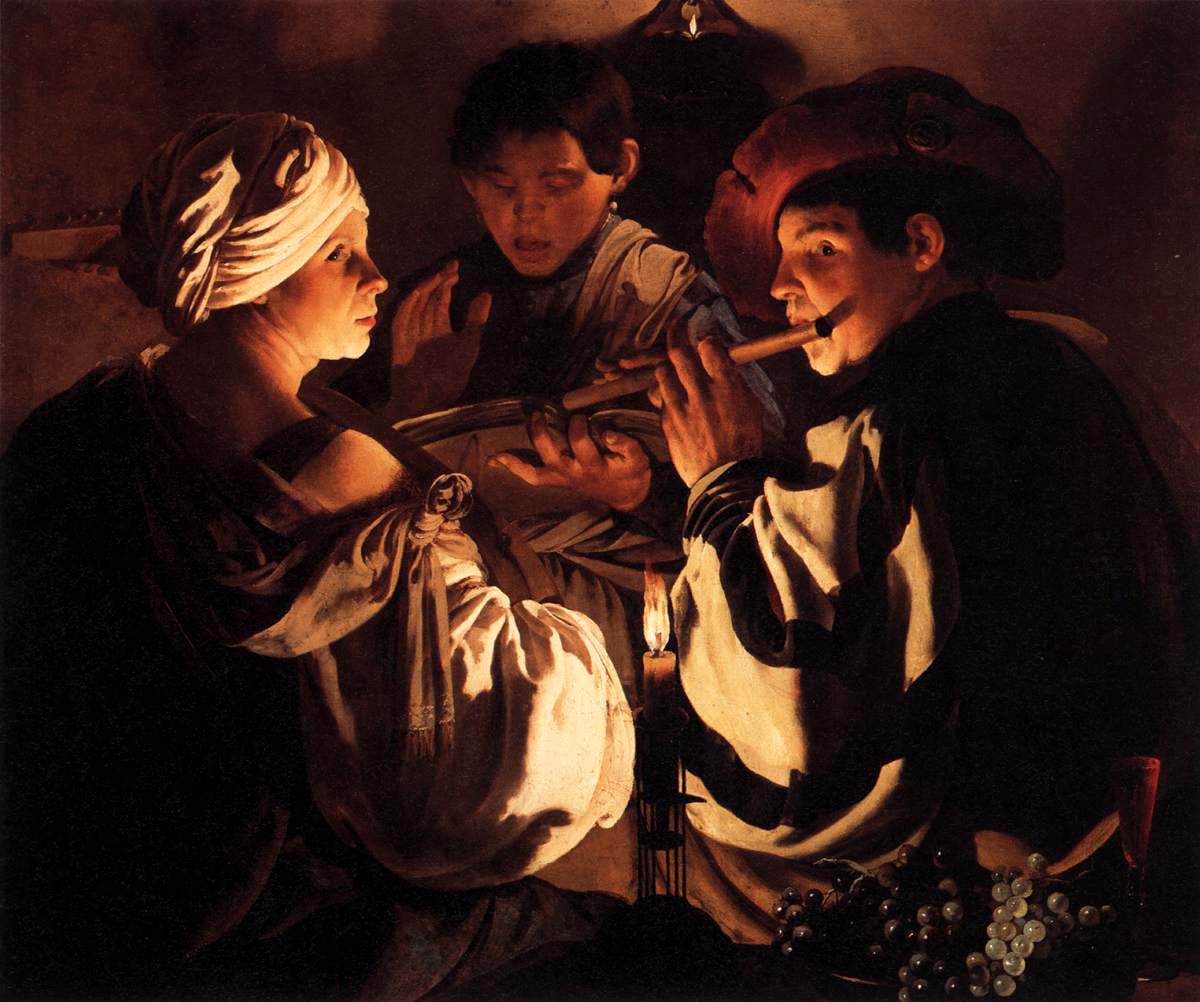
The Concert (1627), 99.1 cm × 116.8 cm (39.0 in × 46.0 in), National Gallery, London
