= Johannes de Renialme =

- Born: about 1600; Antwerp
- Died: 20 April 1657; Amsterdam
- Occupation: art dealer
- Spouses: Margrita Bertolotti van den Heuvel (1629-1630); Maria de Cocquel; Maria Weinrich (1639); Catharina d'Overdage (1643)

Johannes de Renialme (Antwerp, ca. 1600 – buried Amsterdam, 20 April 1657) was a Dutch art dealer, active in Amsterdam and Delft between 1640 and 1657, notable for the scale of his dealings. De Renialme was known for being a dealer of Rembrandt, Hercules Seghers, Jan Lievens and Salomon Koninck. Among his clients was Frederick William, Elector of Brandenburg.

== Biography ==
Johannes de Renialme was born in Antwerp around 1600. He came from a distinguished family of Antwerp and Venice. From the early 1620s until at least 1637 he was living in Middelburg. There is no evidence that he had any training in art, but was known to have practiced as goldsmith and jeweller; he also traded in jewellery.

De Renialme was married four times. On 9 April 1629, he married Margrita Bertolotti van den Heuvel, who died in 1630. He next married Maria de Cocquel and from her inherited some property in Ireland.

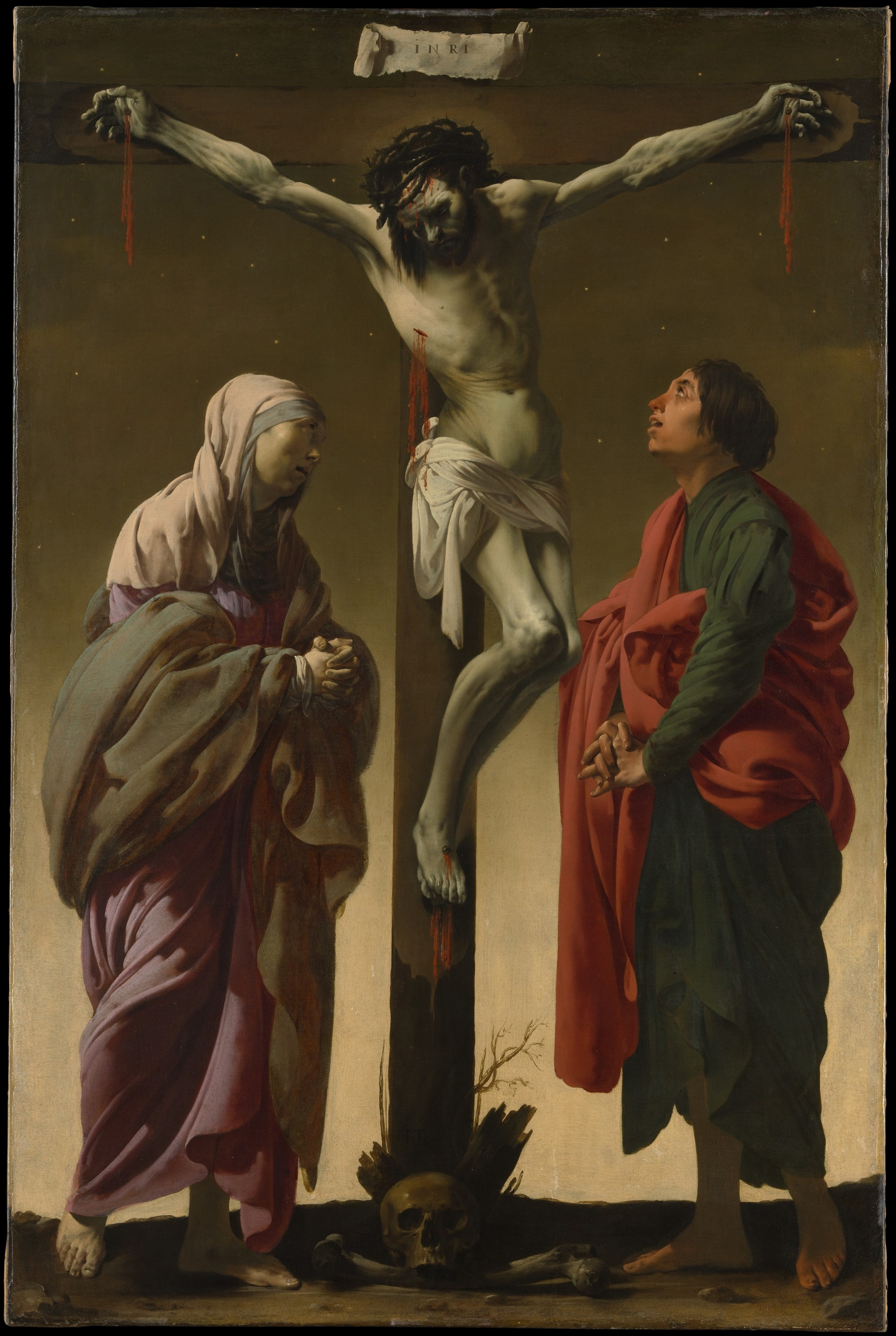
The Crucifixion with the Virgin and Saint John (1625) by Hendrick ter Brugghen, oil on canvas, 154.9 x 102.2 cm, The Metropolitan Museum of Art, from De Renialme's 1657 death inventory

On 19 August 1639, he married Maria Weinrich, widow of the Delft beer brewer Nicolaes Tristram. On 12 August 1640 they had their son Joannes baptised in the Nieuwe Kerk in Amsterdam.

De Renialme's last wife was Catharina d'Overdage whom he married on 1 January 1643 in Delft. When he died in 1657, he was survived by Catharina and his son Joannes. De Renialme was buried on 20 April 1657 in a Dutch Reformed Church ceremony.

== Dealership in art ==
The first evidence of his purchases of art is from records of the Johan van Maerlen (1577-1637) sale of 30 September 1637 in which he was a buyer.

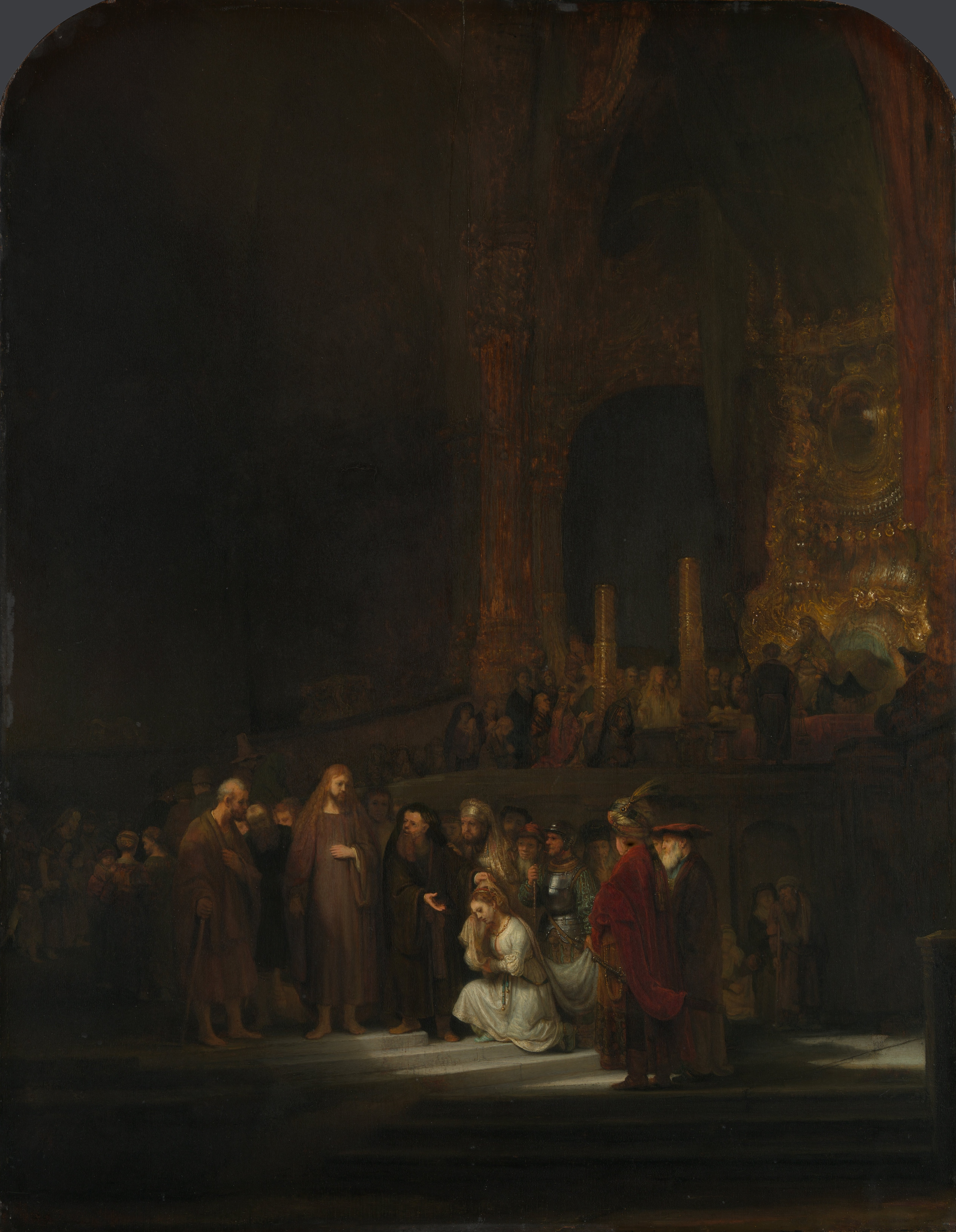
Christ and the Woman Taken in Adultery (1644) by Rembrandt, oil on panel, 83.8 x 65.4 cm, National Gallery, London, from the 1657 death inventory

By 25 April 1640, his inventory listed 149 art works, among which paintings by Hercules Seghers, Jan Miense Molenaer, Hendrick ter Brugghen, Albrecht Dürer and a Rembrandt, valued highest of all at 100 Dutch guilders.

In order to sell there, he joined Delft's Guild of St. Luke in 1644, maintaining houses in Delft and Amsterdam.

Upon his death his inventory of 538 artworks was valued at 36,512 guilders. There were 13 paintings by Rembrandt.
