= Crucifixion with the Virgin and St John =

C. 1625 painting by Hendrick ter Brugghen

Crucifixion with the Virgin and Saint John
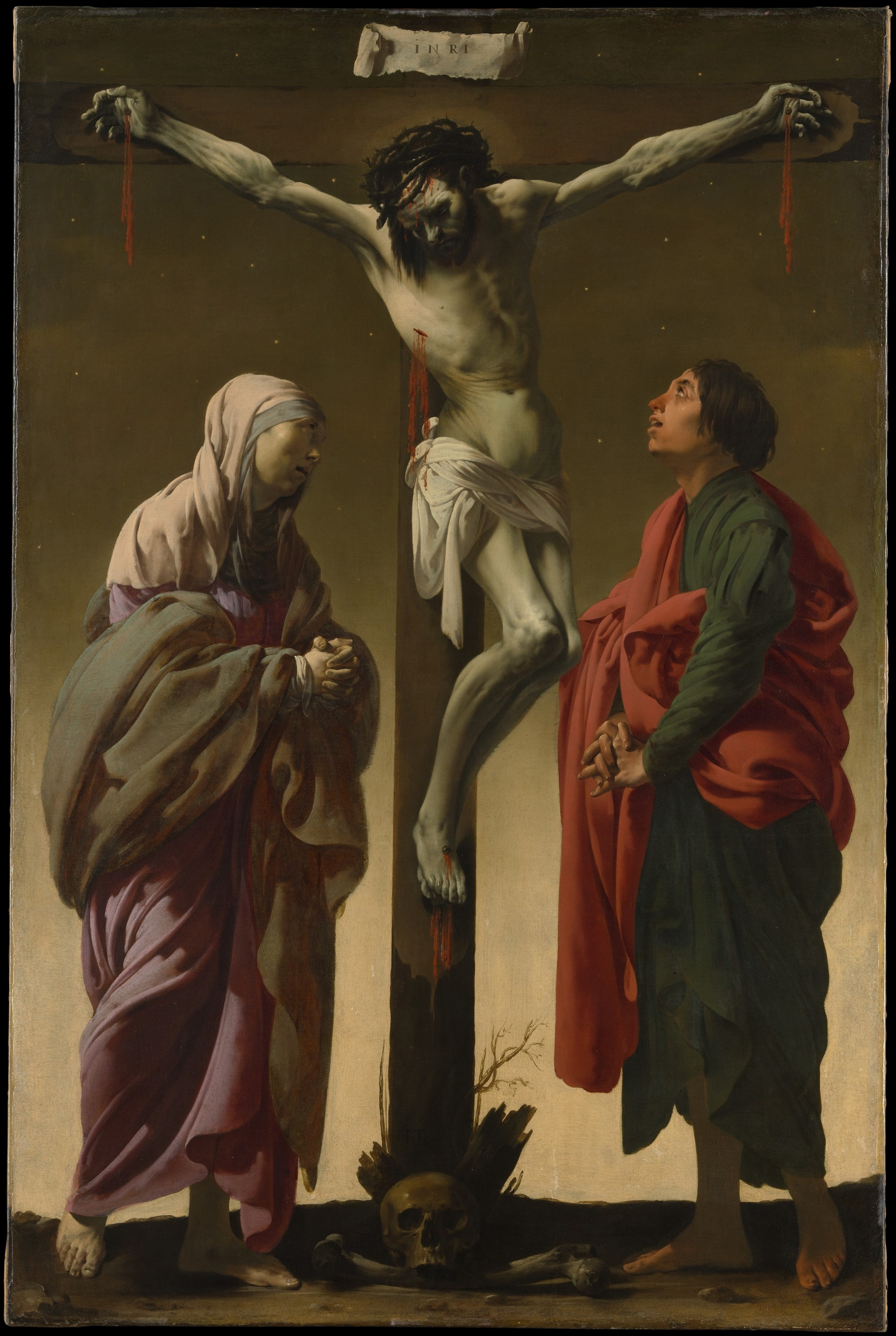
- Artist: Hendrick ter Brugghen
- Year: c. 1625
- Medium: oil on canvas
- Subject: Crucifixion of Jesus
- Dimensions: 154.9 cm × 102.2 cm (61.0 in × 40.2 in)
- Condition: "The painting is well preserved. The gray color of Mary's cloak and the gray-green cast of the night sky suggest that these passages may contain a discolored smalt pigment."
- Location: The Metropolitan Museum of Art; New York City
- Owner: The Metropolitan Museum of Art
- Accession: 56.228
- Website: http://www.metmuseum.org/collections/search-the-collections/110000250

The Crucifixion with the Virgin and St John by Hendrick ter Brugghen is an oil painting, now in the Metropolitan Museum of Art in New York City. It was probably painted c. 1625 as an altarpiece for a Catholic schuilkerk, a "hidden church" or "church in the attic", in the Calvinist Dutch United Provinces, probably Utrecht. When discovered in a bombed out church in South Hackney, London in 1956, it was unknown, but by the time it appeared in Sotheby's salesroom in November of that year it was recognized as an important example of Utrecht Caravaggism. It was acquired by the museum in the sale.

== Provenance ==
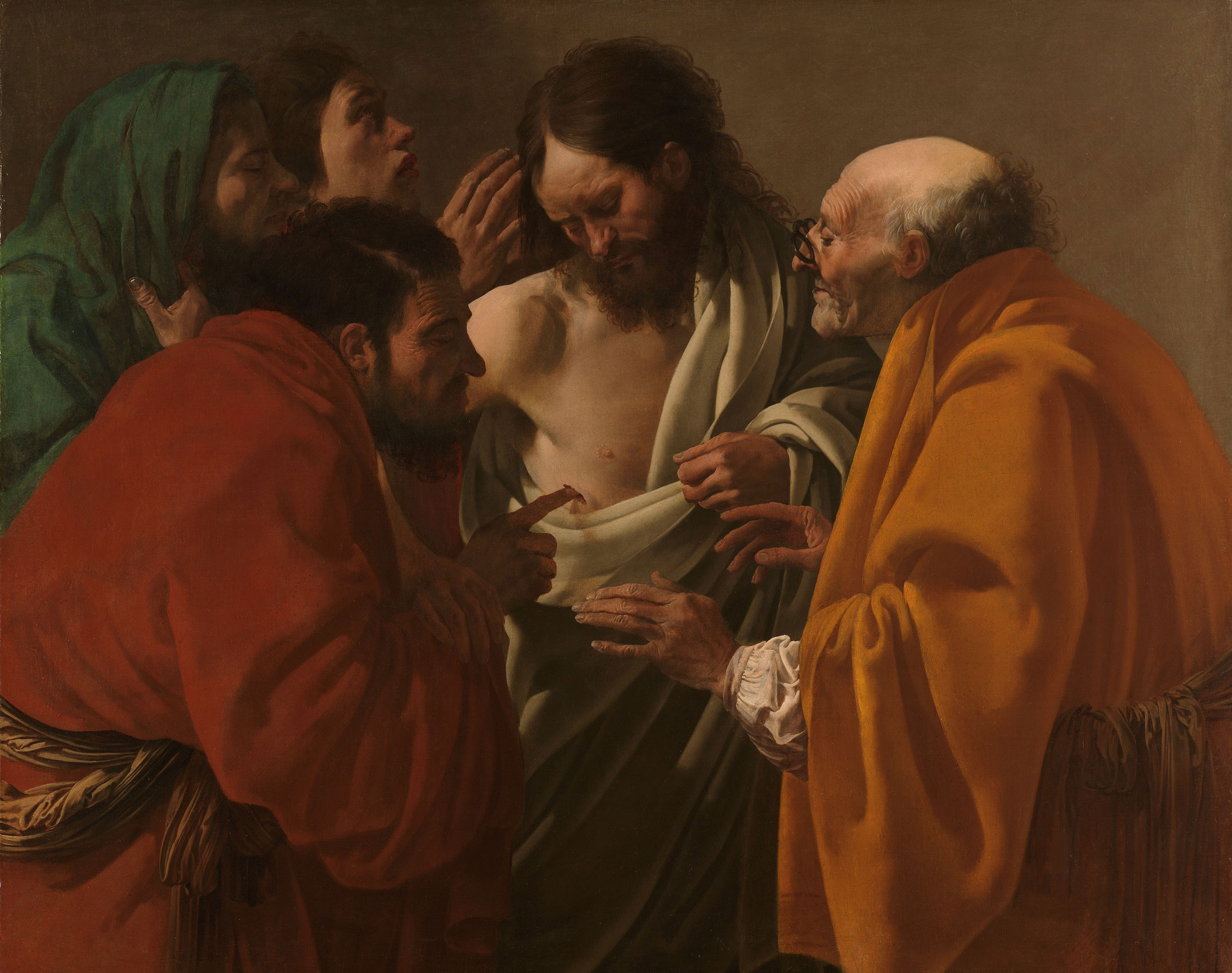
The Incredulity of Saint Thomas, oil on canvas, 108.8 x 136.5 cm, Rijksmuseum, Amsterdam

Although the date is partly illegible, stylistically it comes closest to Ter Brugghen's Saint Sebastian Tended by Irene at the Allen Memorial Art Museum in Oberlin, which is dated 1625. It was probably commissioned for a chapel or private church, although some contention has existed over whether this would have been Catholic or Protestant.

The posthumous inventory of Johannes de Renialme, for a sale of June 27, 1657, lists as no. 137 Een Christus aen 't cruys, van Van der Brugge, there valued at 150 guilders; possibly this painting. It served as an altarpiece in a side chapel of Christ Church, South Hackney, London, between about 1898 and 1956, when the church was demolished and the painting moved to the Church of St John-at-Hackney. The church sold the painting to Nigel Foxell of Oxford for £75. His father, Rev. Lambert Francis Eyre Foxell, had been the last vicar of Christ Church. Foxell consigned the painting to auction at Sotheby's on 28 November 1956. It realised £15,000 (lot 115). Foxell donated the proceeds (minus Sotheby's 10% commission) to the Diocese of London.

== Composition ==
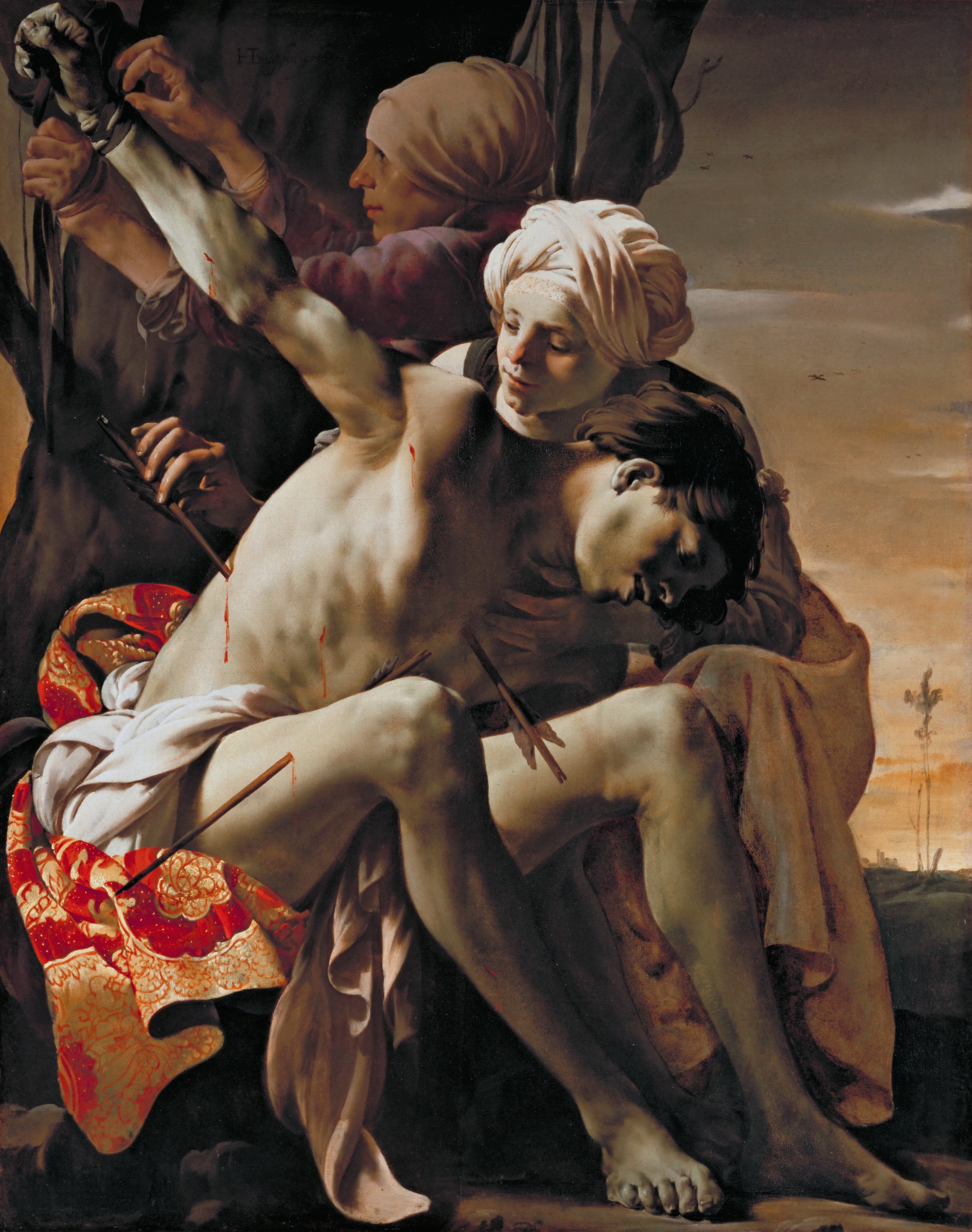
Saint Sebastian Tended by Irene, oil on canvas, 149 x 119.4 cm, Allen Memorial Art Museum

Ter Brugghen's scene is taken from the Gospel of John: "When Jesus therefore saw his mother, and the disciple standing by, whom he loved, he saith unto his mother, Woman, behold thy son! Then saith he to the disciple, Behold thy mother! And from that hour that disciple took her unto his own home." John 19:26-27 The dead Christ is mourned by Mary and John the Apostle. At the base of the cross are bones, traditionally identified as the bones of Adam. The scene is set in an atmosphere of deep dusk; stars visible in the background.

The low horizon and the height at which this work, as an altarpiece would have been displayed, brings the viewer in direct confrontation with the skull and bones, telling us where we are in geographically (Golgotha, the place of a skull) and existentially (in the form of a memento mori). The head of Christ bears a resemblance to the Christ in Ter Brugghen's The Incredulity of Saint Thomas (Rijksmuseum, Amsterdam), painted between 1621 and 1623. Another indication that Ter Brugghen might have used models more than once, is the similarity between his Saint Sebastian in the Oberlin picture and Saint John here.

The starry sky is given us by the Gospel of Matthew: "Now from the sixth hour there was darkness over all the land unto the ninth hour." Matthew 27:45 Ter Brugghen renders it so naturalistically that we have reason to believe he had actually witnessed a total solar eclipse, and we know there had been one when he was still in Rome, on Wednesday, October 12, 1605, although the site of total eclipse in Italy was Sicily. It seems as likely to be a similar stylistic device to that used in his Saint Sebastian.

Perhaps the strongest indication that the picture is situated in the context of the Counter-Reformation in Utrecht, and thus would have been painted for a Catholic client, is the unnatural, archaic rendering of the blood from Christ's wounds. Christ's blood looks like it has been painted on the picture plane, and could thus serve as a strong symbol of the Eucharist. In this context Mary acts as intercessor for the faithful. This motif of blood was frequently employed in painting before 1400, and shortly after, such as in a Jan van Eyck Crucifixion (1430) in Berlin, but was rarely used in Ter Brugghen's time due to the iconoclasm of the Calvinists and the post-Tridentine Catholic theologians.

If Mary represents the Church, John represents the priesthood. They are set apart from Christ, who is depicted archaically, by their stylistically modern, Caravaggesque appearance. While the viewer would have been comfortable with the familiar iconographic depiction of Christ, the sophisticate would have appreciated the fashionable depiction of John and Mary and relished the references to other familiar works. The composition has been compared to that of a widely distributed (by Ter Brugghen's time) 1511 engraving by Albrecht Dürer, along with the Calvary of Hendrik van Rijn (1363), which the painter would have seen in St. John's Church, Utrecht, and the Crucifixions of the German Mathis Grünewald (c. 1470 – 1528).

== Referenced works ==
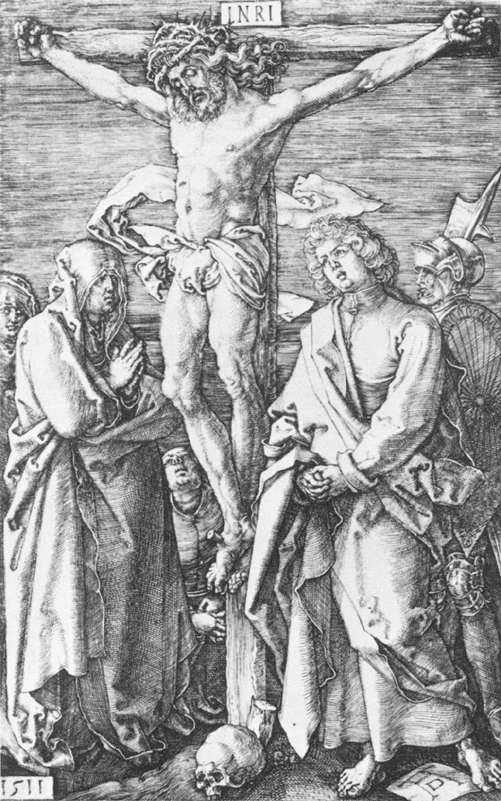
The Crucifixion (No. 11) (1511) engraving by Albrecht Dürer, Metropolitan Museum of Art, New York City

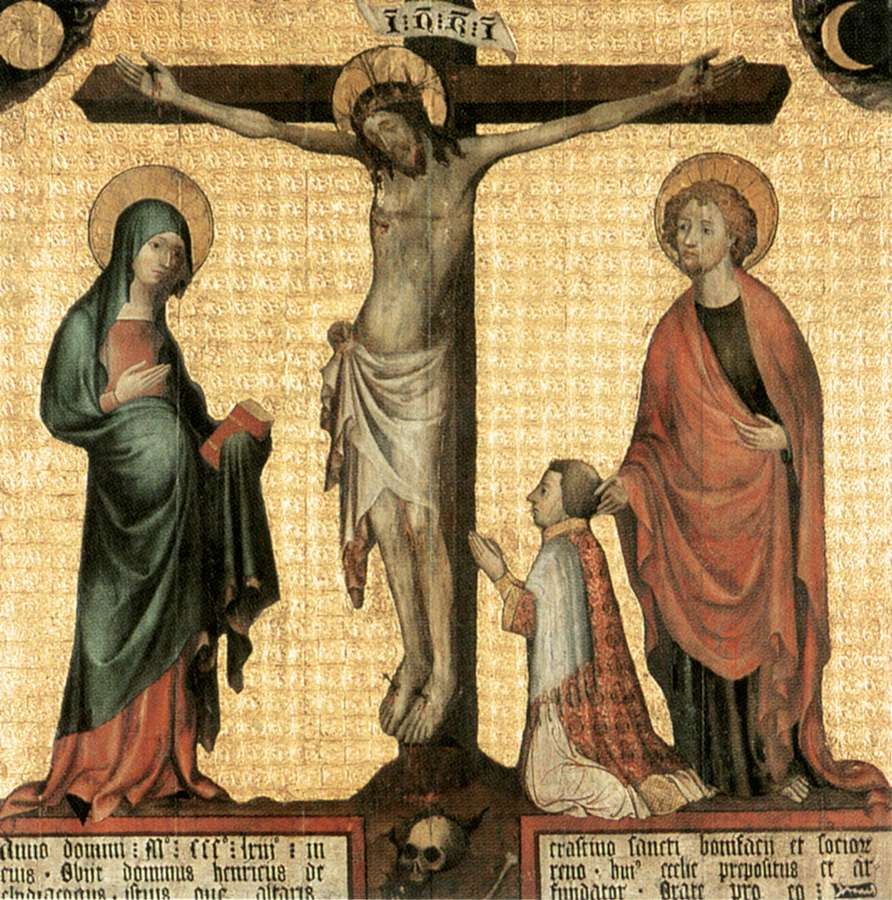
Calvary of Hendrik van Rijn (1363), Royal Museum of Fine Arts, Antwerp

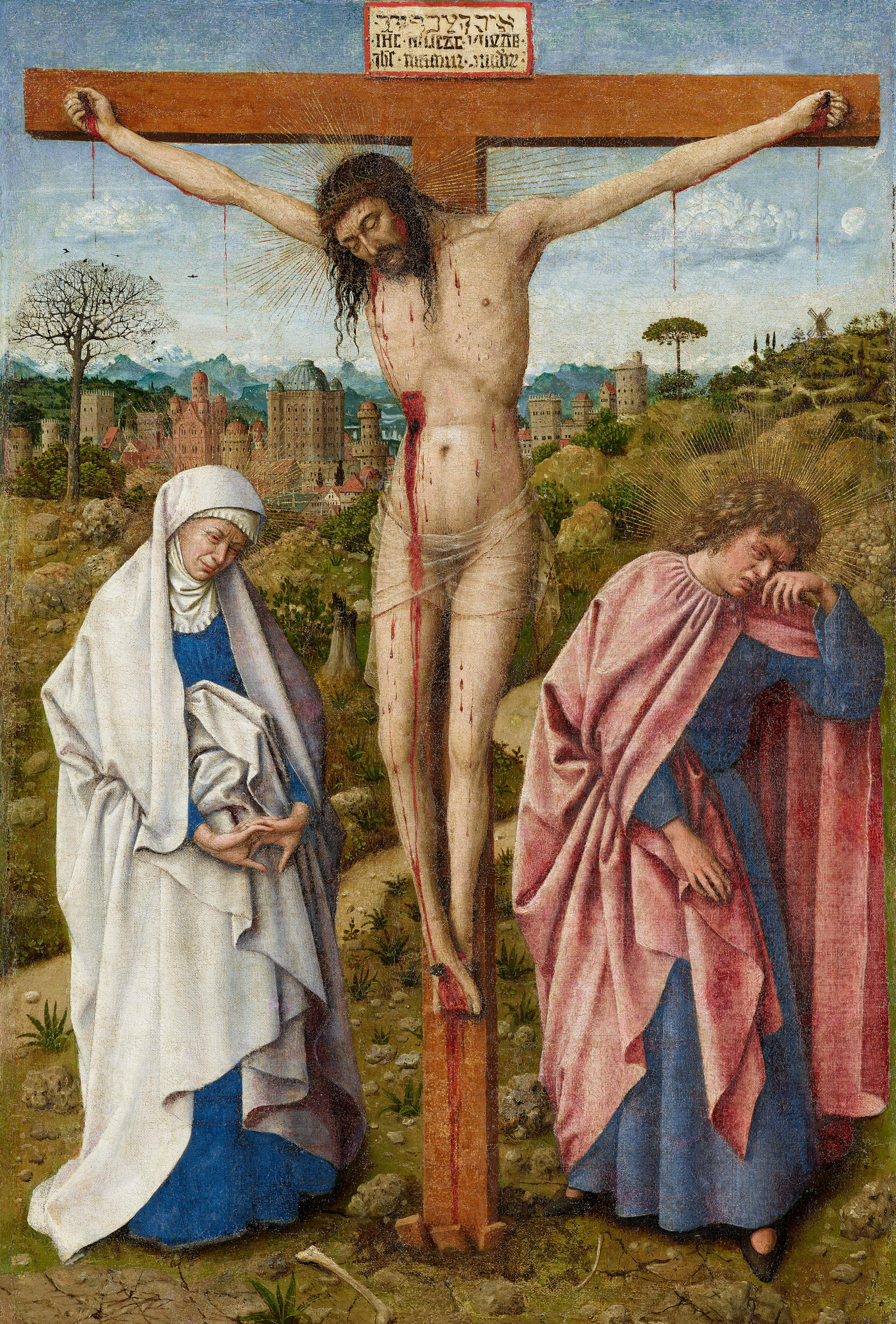
The Crucifixion (about 1430) by Jan van Eyck, Gemäldegalerie, Berlin

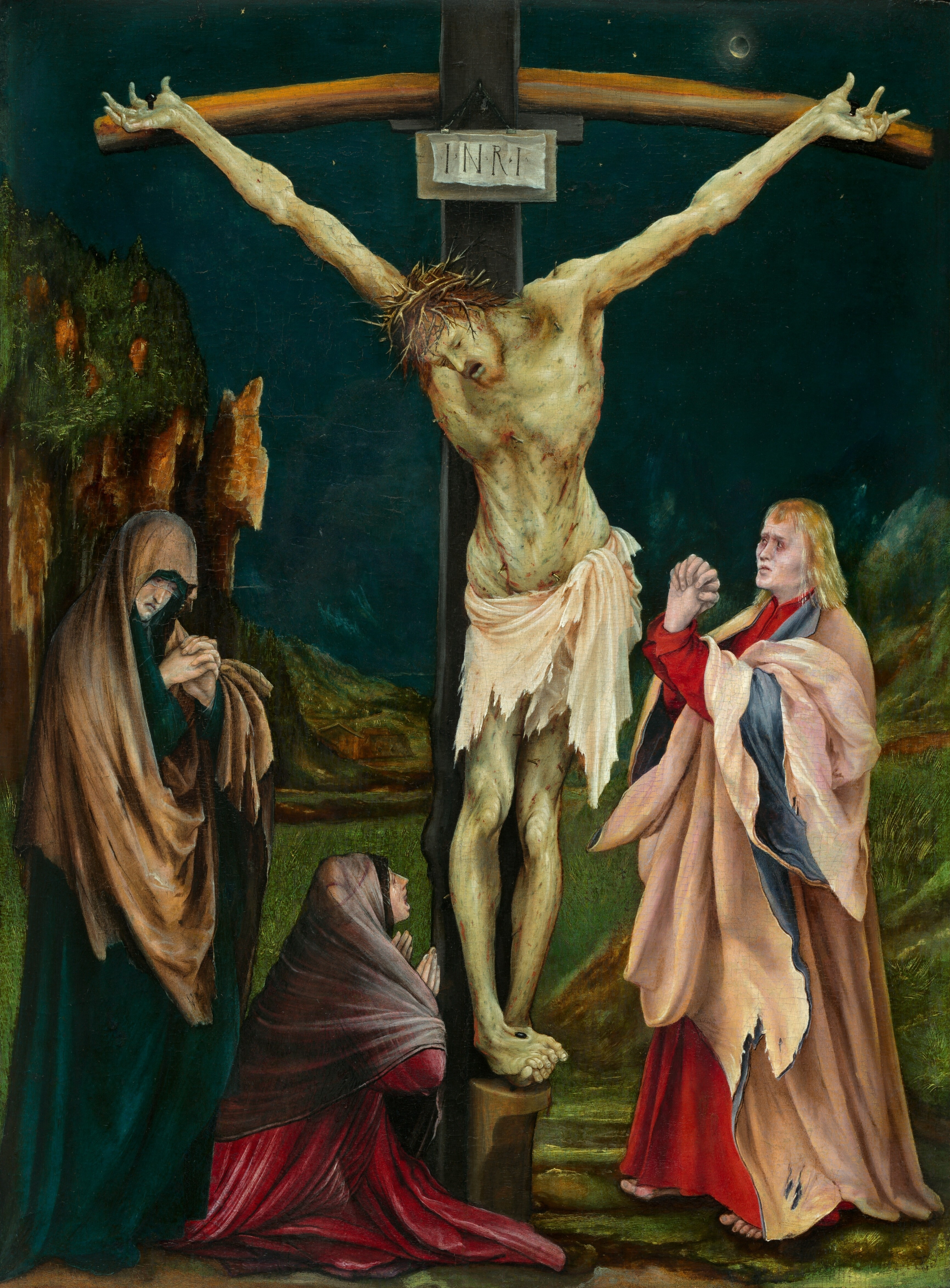
The Small Crucifixion (1511-1520) by Mathis Grünewald, National Gallery of Art, Washington, D.C.

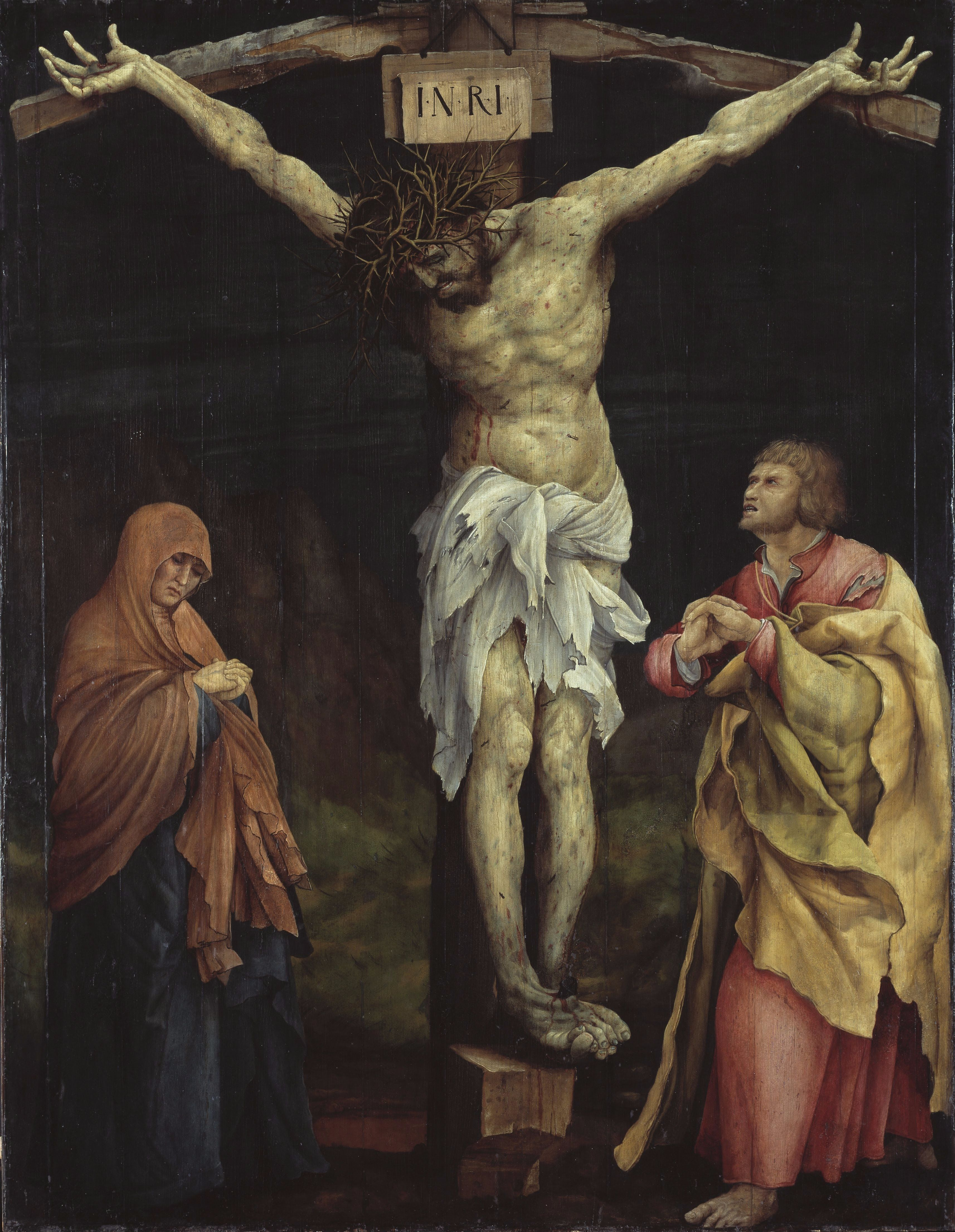
Die Kreuzigung Christi (1523-1524) from the Tauberbischofsheim altarpiece by Mathis Grünewald, Staatliche Kunsthalle Karlsruhe

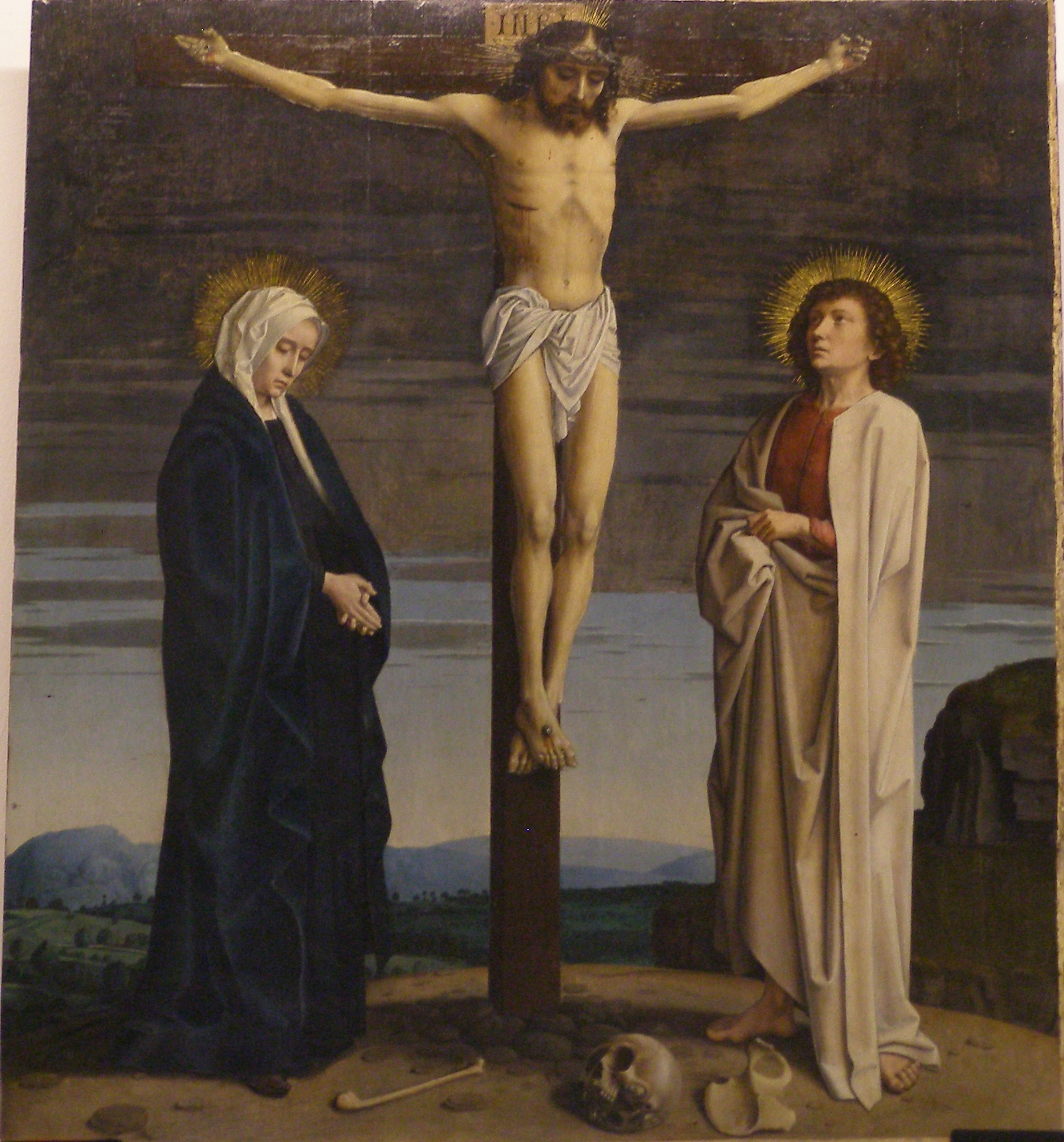
The Crucifixion by Gerard David (about 1460 - 1523), Galleria di Palazzo Bianco, Genoa
