= Hendrick ter Brugghen =

Dutch painter (1588–1629)

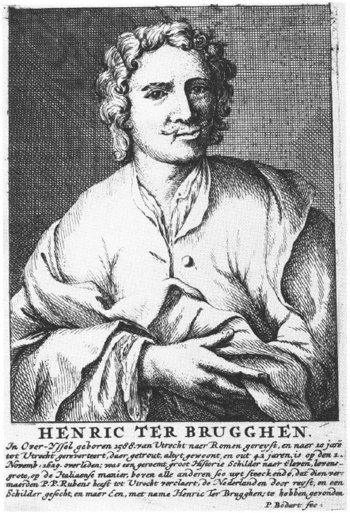
- Pieter Bodart's Portrait of Henric Ter Brugghen (1708), engraving after a lost drawing by Gerard Hoet, 15.8 x 10.6 cm
- Born: 1588; The Hague
- Died: 1 November 1629 (aged 40–41); Utrecht
- Education: Abraham Bloemaert
- Known for: Painting
- Notable work: The Denial of Saint Peter; The Crucifixion with the Virgin and St. John
- Movement: Caravaggisti

Hendrick Jansz ter Brugghen (or Terbrugghen; 1588 – 1 November 1629) was a Dutch painter of genre scenes and religious subjects. He was one of the Dutch followers of Caravaggio – the so-called Utrecht Caravaggisti. Along with Gerrit van Hondhorst and Dirck van Baburen, Ter Brugghen was one of the most important Dutch painters to have been influenced by Caravaggio.

== Biography ==
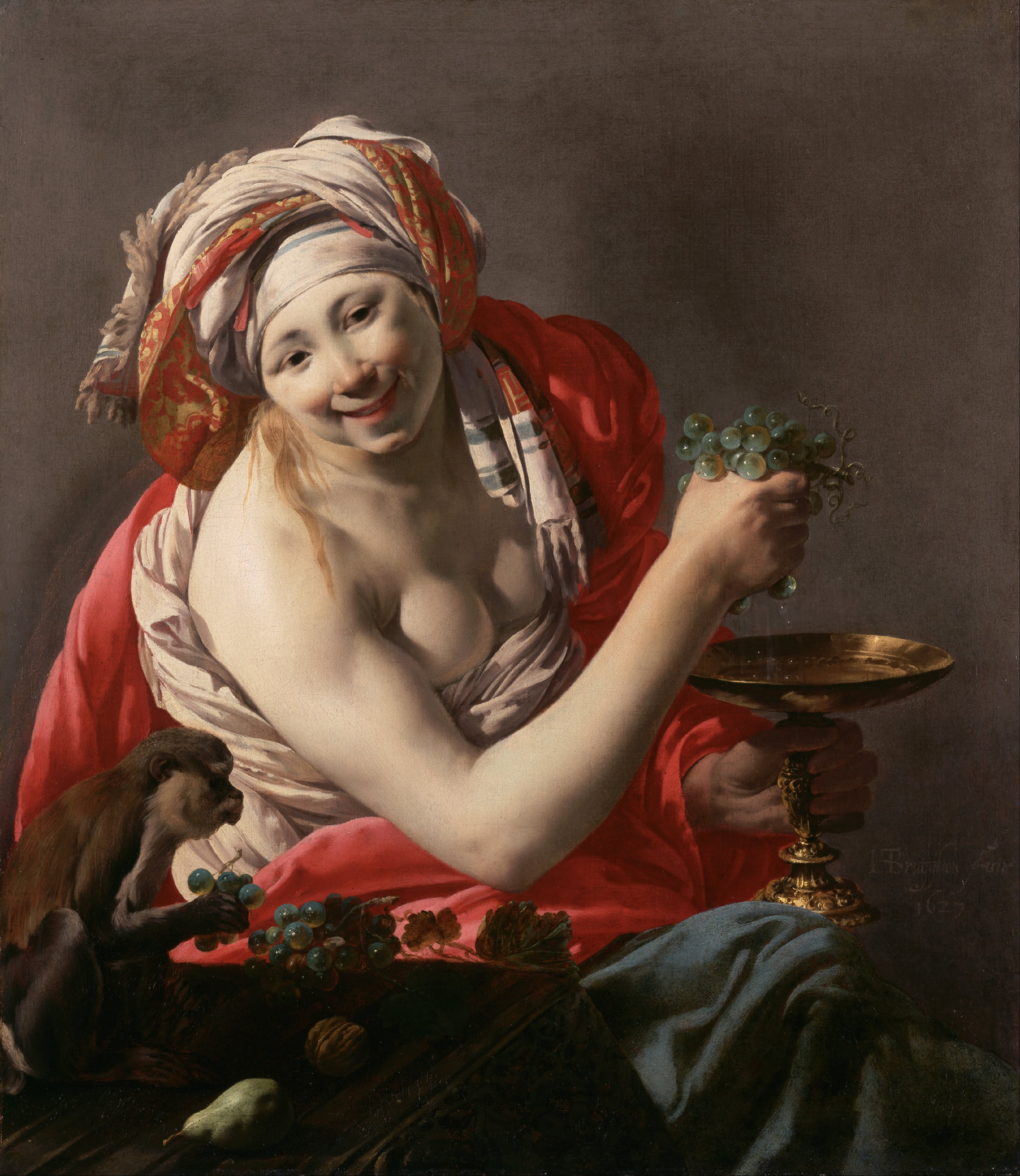
Bacchante with an Ape (1627), 100 x 90 cm, Getty Museum, Los Angeles

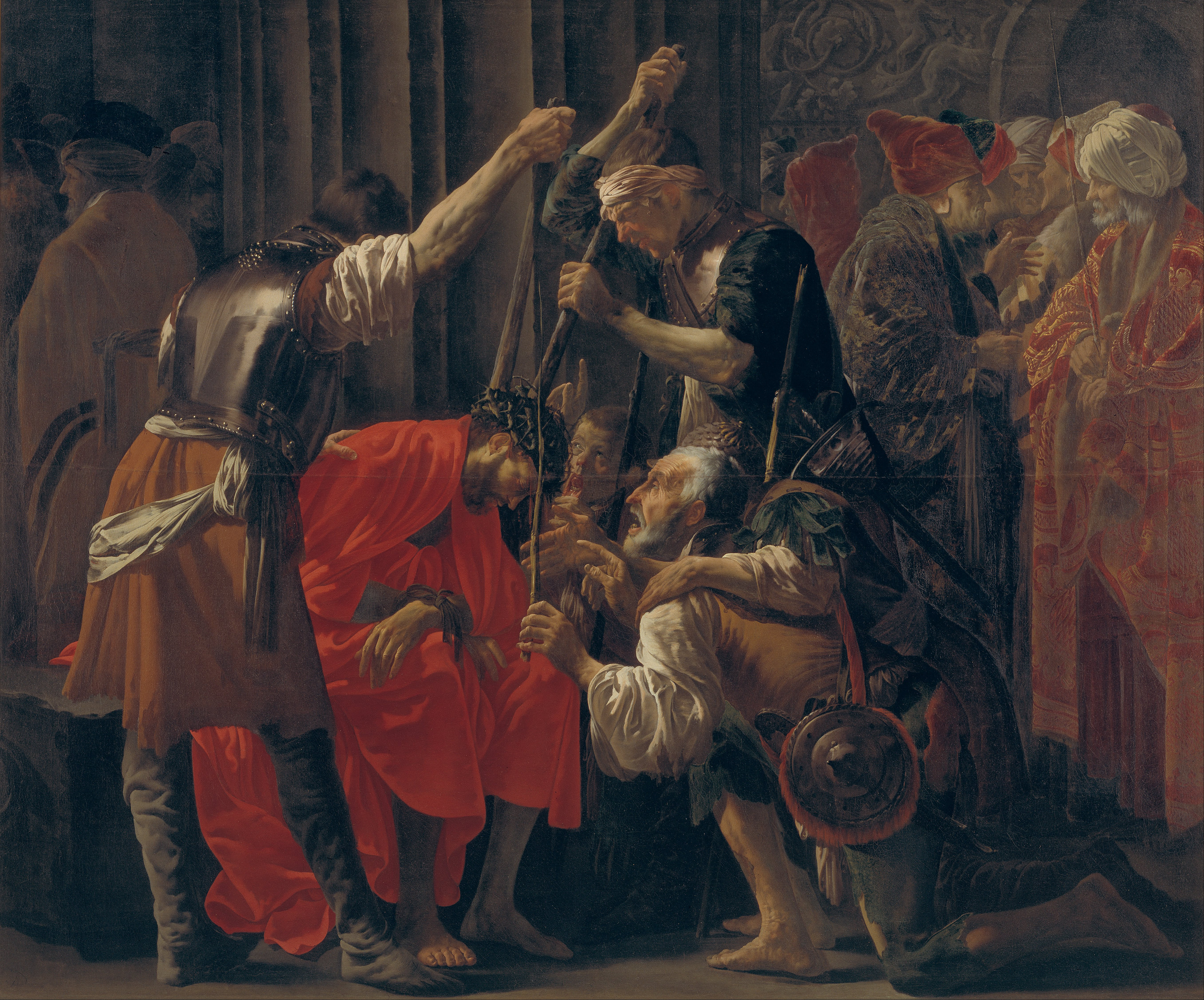
Christ Crowned with Thorns (1620), 240 x 207 cm, Statens Museum for Kunst, Copenhagen

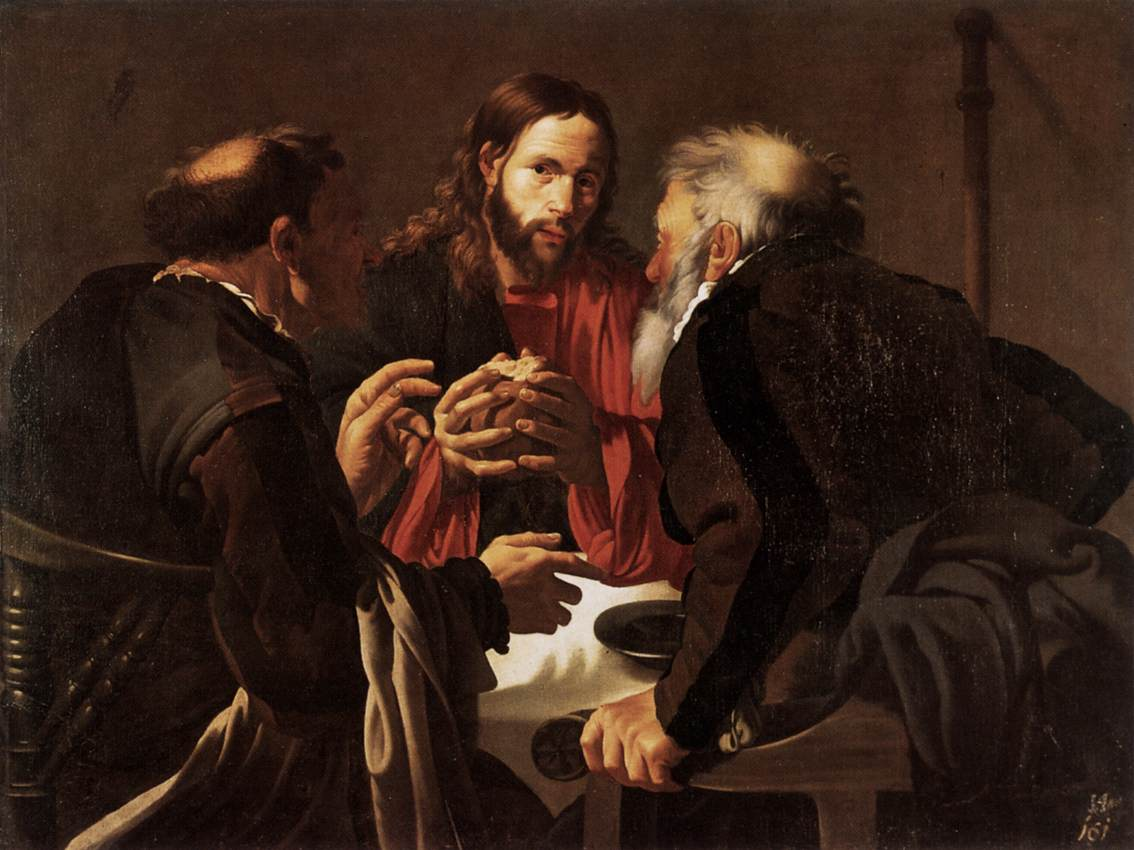
The Supper at Emmaus (1621), 109 x 141 cm, Sanssouci Picture Gallery, Berlin

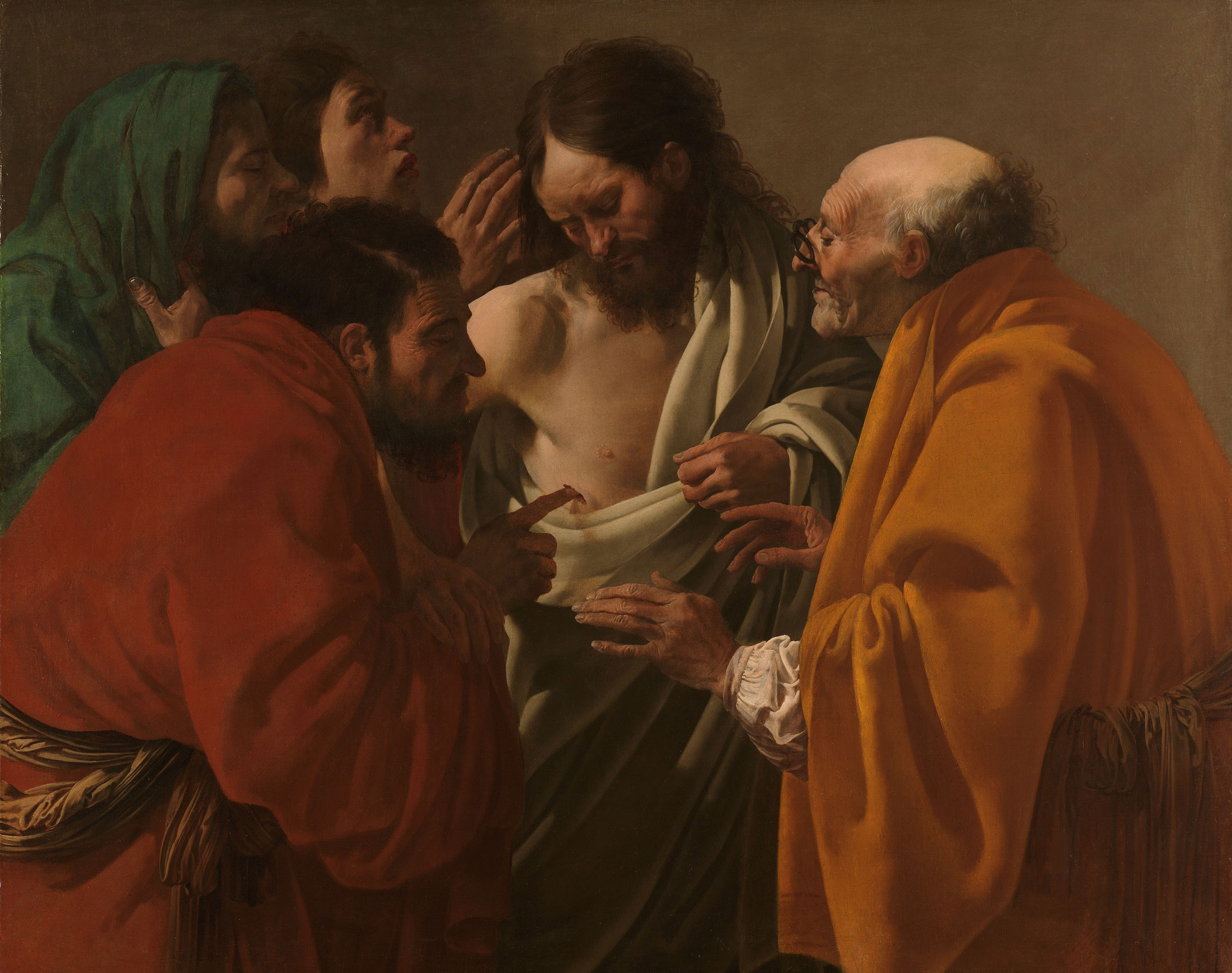
The Incredulity of St. Thomas (c. 1621–1623), 108.8 x 136.5 cm, Rijksmuseum, Amsterdam

No references to Ter Brugghen written during his life have been identified. His father Jan Egbertsz ter Brugghen, originally from Overijssel, had moved to Utrecht, where he was appointed secretary to the Court of Utrecht by the Prince of Orange, William the Silent. He had been married to Sophia Dircx. In 1588, he became bailiff to the Provincial Council of Holland in The Hague, where Hendrick was born.

The earliest brief reference to the painter is in Het Gulden Cabinet (1661) of Cornelis de Bie, where he is mistakenly referred to as Verbrugghen. Another short account is found in the Teutsche Academie (1675) by Joachim von Sandrart, where he is referred to as Verbrug. Here we learn that he studied with Abraham Bloemaert, a Mannerist painter. Sandrart also refers to the painter's "tiefsinnige, jedoch, schwermütige Gedanken in seinen Werken" [profound, but melancholic thoughts in his works].

From this unsure footing, the artist's son Richard ter Brugghen sought to rehabilitate his father's reputation as a painter in the early 18th century. He secured a letter, dated 15 April 1707, from Adriaen van der Werff in Rotterdam, attesting to his appreciation of Hendrick's work. Later that year, on 5 August 1707, Richard presented the government council of Deventer with four paintings of the Evangelists, to be hung in the Town Hall as a permanent memorial to his father.

An engraving, in all likelihood commissioned by Richard ter Brugghen from Pieter Bodart, and based on an earlier drawing by Gerard Hoet, was put about in 1708. It shows an idealised portrait of Hendrick, the family coat-of-arms, and a printed caption translated from the Dutch as:

Born in Overijsel in 1588, travelled from Utrecht to Rome, and ten years later returned to Utrecht, married there, lived there interruptedly, and died at the age of 42 on 1st Nov. 1629; he was a great and famous history painter from life, painting life-size figures in the Italian manner, so very superior to all others that the famous P. P. Rubens on travelling through the Netherlands declared on coming to Utrecht that he had found only one painter, namely Henricus ter Brugghen. G. Hoet del. P. Bodart, fec.

Cornelis de Bie, in his Spiegel vande Verdrayde Werelt (1708), and Arnold Houbraken, in his De Groote Schouburgh (1718–1721), produced biographies where they repeated Richard's claims that the painter met Rubens in Rome and also worked in Naples. There was a cadet of the same name serving in the army of Ernst Casimir of Nassau-Dietz in the spring of 1607, and for this reason, Ter Brugghen is thought to have been in Italy, but only in that year, rather than as previously believed in 1604 (inferred as it was from the inscription on the Bodart print). This would certainly mean that he never met Caravaggio in Rome; that artist had fled Rome on a murder charge in 1606. However, it is certain that he was the only Dutch painter in Rome during Caravaggio's lifetime.

By 1614, Ter Brugghen was in Milan, on his way home. On 1 April 1615, Thyman van Galen and Ter Brugghen are witnesses before the court in Utrecht. He is already listed as a member of the Utrecht painter's guild in 1616, and on 15 October of that year he married Jacomijna Verbeeck, his elder brother Jan's stepdaughter.

Ter Brugghen died in Utrecht on 1 November 1629, possibly a victim of the plague. The family had been living in the Snippenvlucht. Ter Brugghen's last child of eight, Hennickgen, was born four months later on 14 March 1630.

== Work and impact ==
He certainly studied Caravaggio's work, as well as that of his followers–the Italian Caravaggisti–such as Orazio Gentileschi. Caravaggio's work had caused quite a sensation in Italy. His paintings were characteristic for their bold tenebroso technique–the contrast produced by clear, bright surfaces alongside sombre, dark sections–but also for the social realism of the subjects, sometimes charming, sometimes shocking or downright vulgar. Other Italian painters who had an influence on Ter Brugghen during his stay in Italy were Annibale Carracci, Domenichino and Guido Reni.

Upon returning to Utrecht, he worked with Gerard van Honthorst, another of the Dutch Caravaggisti. Ter Brugghen's favourite subjects were half-length figures of drinkers or musicians, but he also produced larger-scale religious images and group portraits. He carried with him Caravaggio's influence, and his paintings have a strong dramatic use of light and shadow, as well as emotionally charged subjects. His treatment of religious subjects can be seen reflected in the work of Rembrandt, and elements of his style can also be found in the paintings of Frans Hals and Johannes Vermeer. Peter Paul Rubens described ter Brugghen's work as "...above that of all the other Utrecht artists".

== Selected works ==
Works include:

- Saint Sebastian Tended by Irene (1625)
- The Crucifixion with the Virgin and St. John, (c. 1625)
- The Denial of St. Peter (1628)
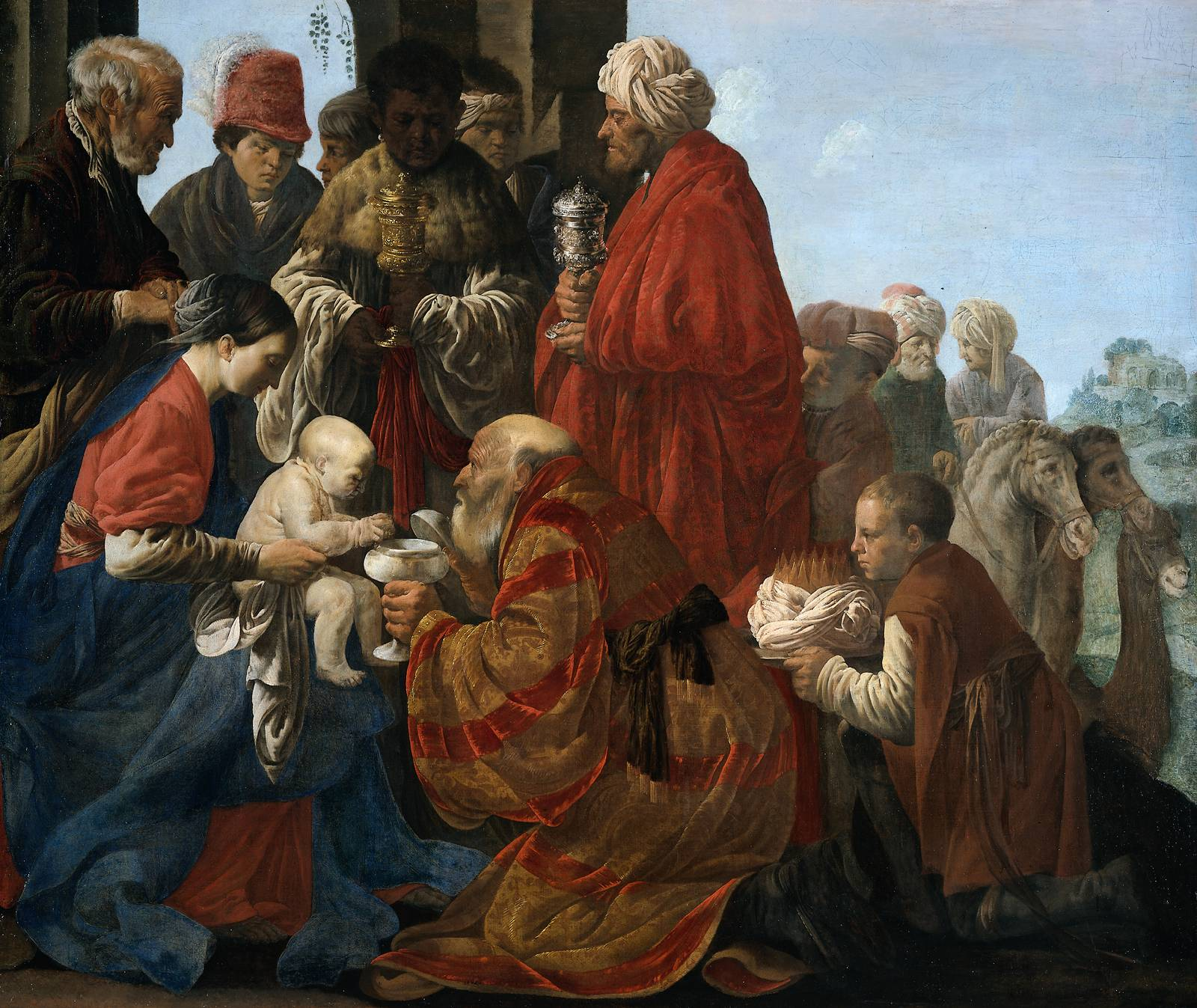
The Adoration of the Magi (1619), 132.5 x 160.5 cm, Rijksmuseum, Amsterdam

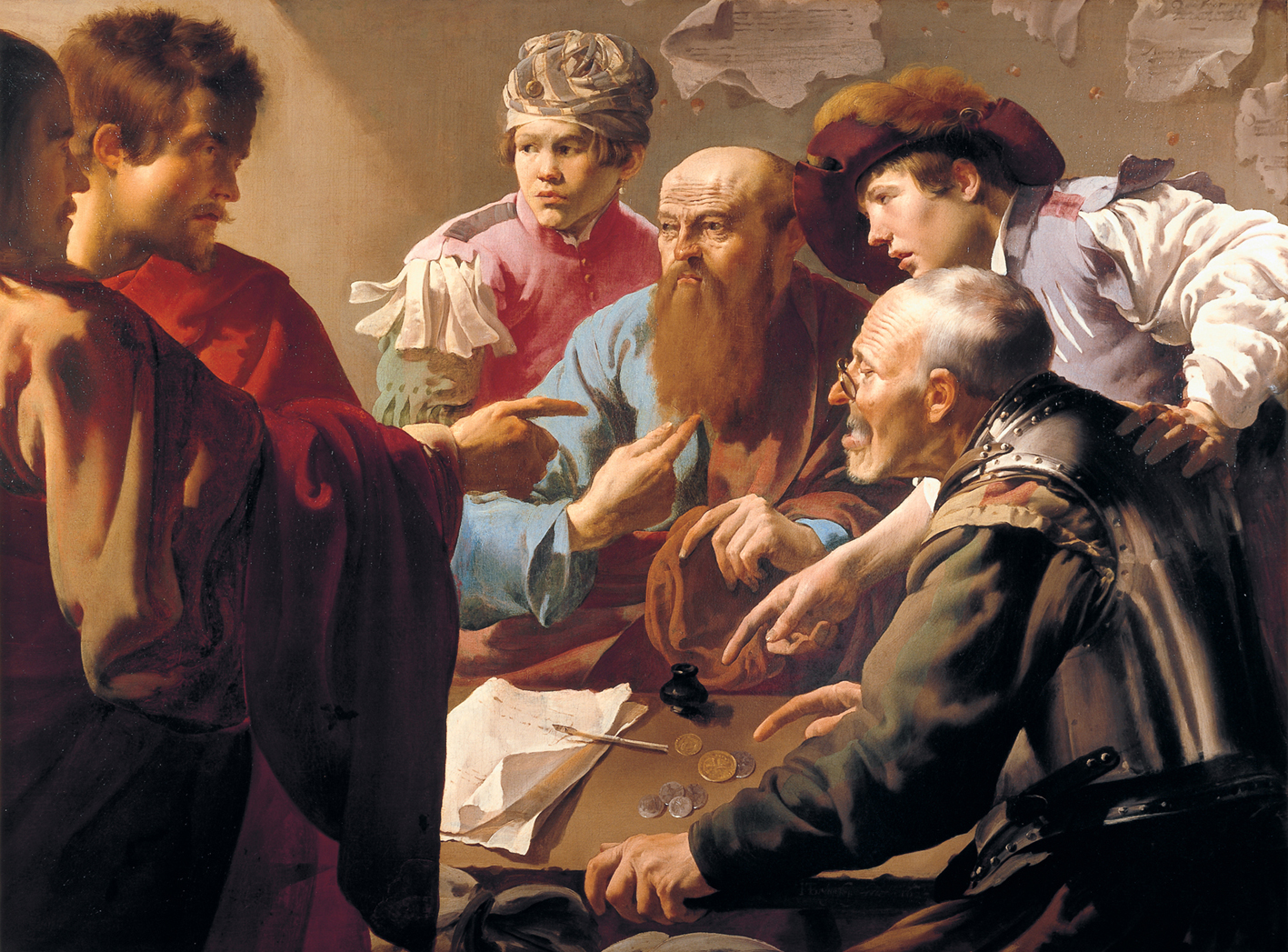
The Calling of St. Matthew (1621), 102 × 137 cm, Centraal Museum, Utrecht

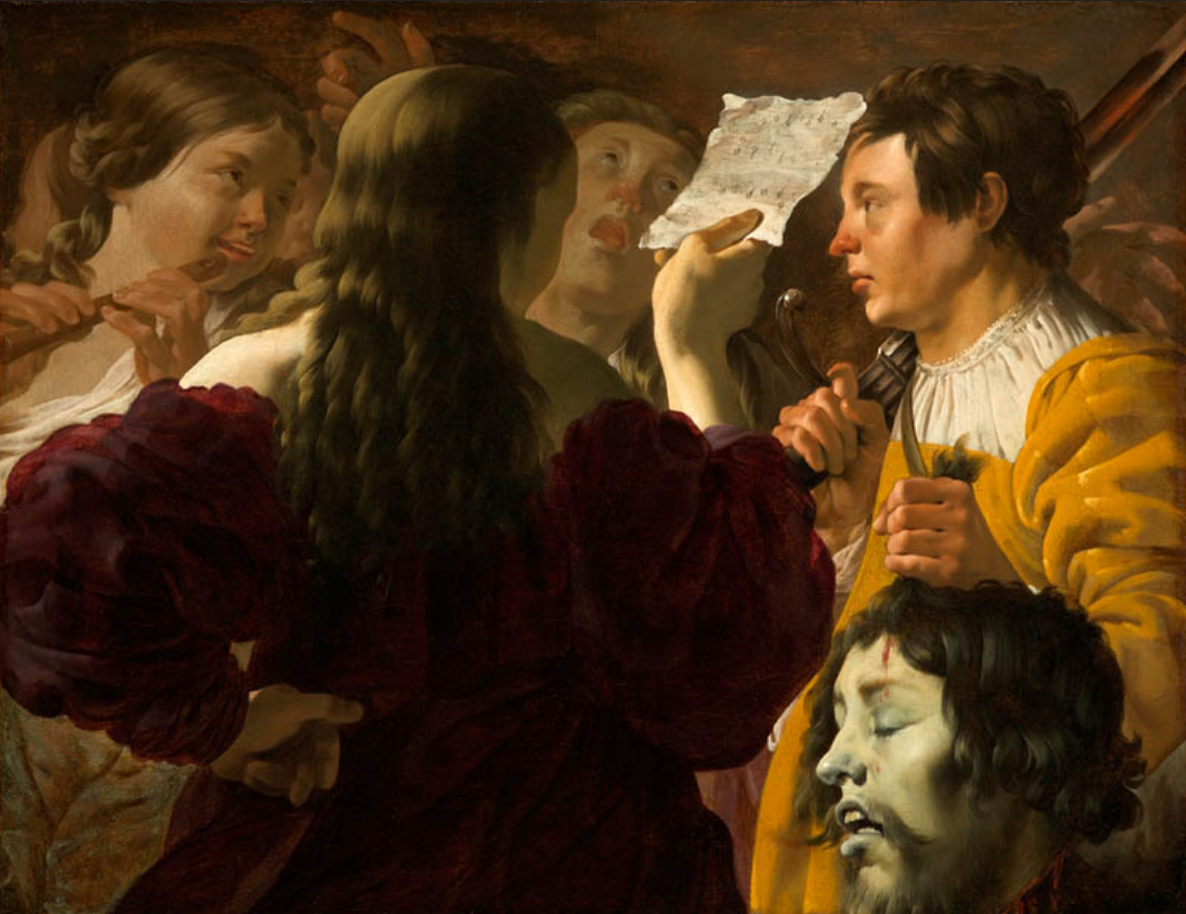
David Saluted by the Israelite Women (1623), North Carolina Museum of Art, Raleigh

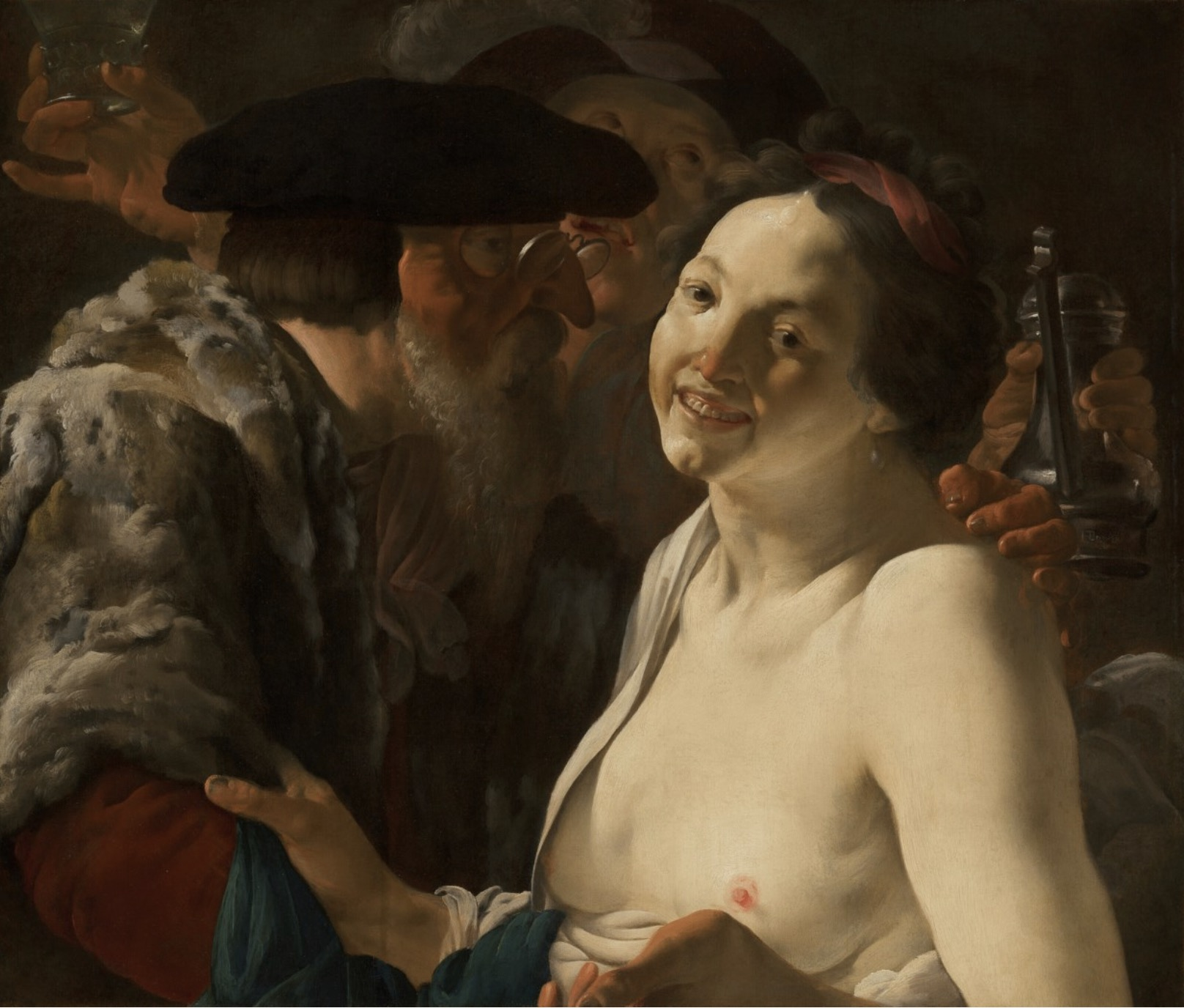
Unequal Couple, c. 1623

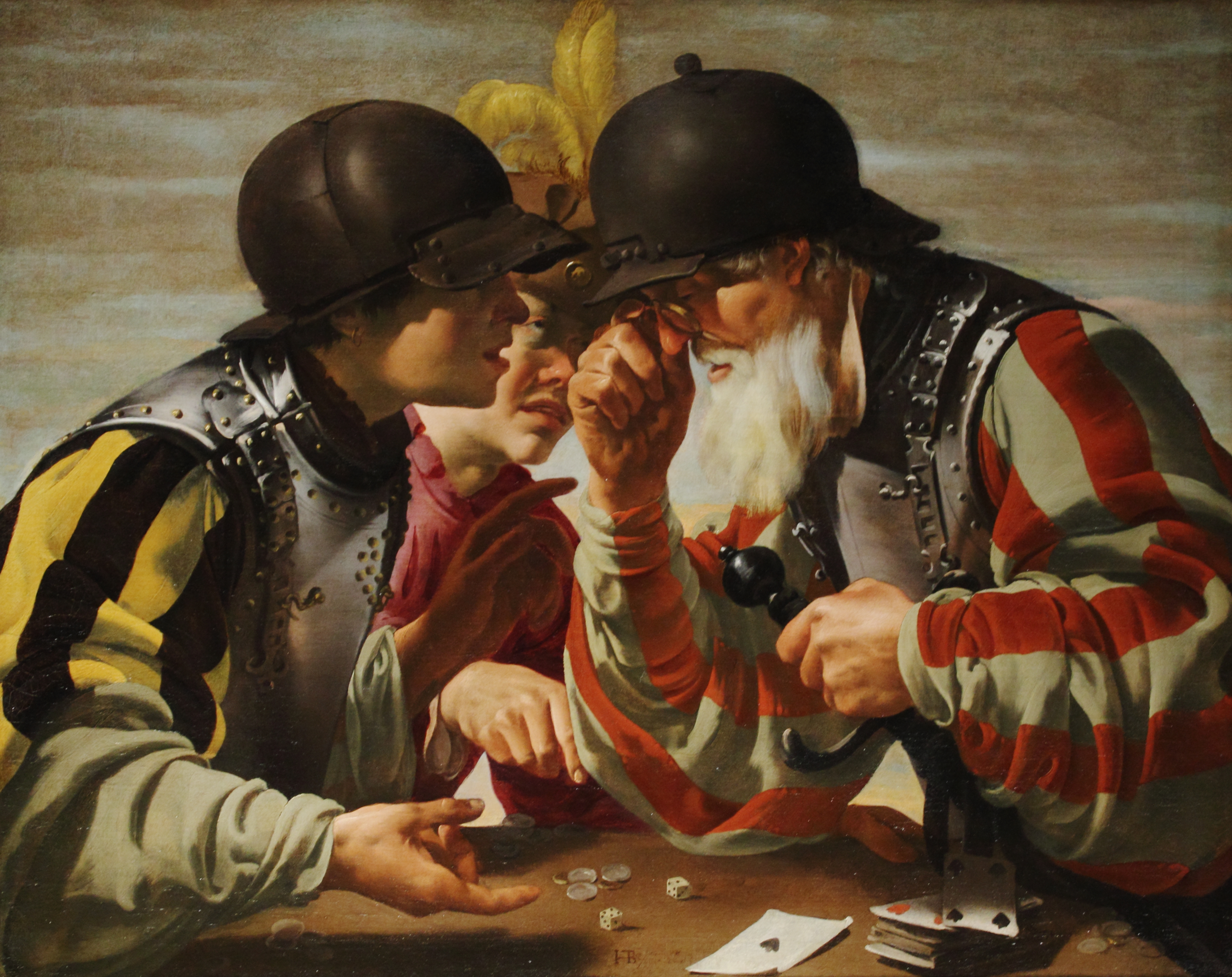
The Card Players, 1623

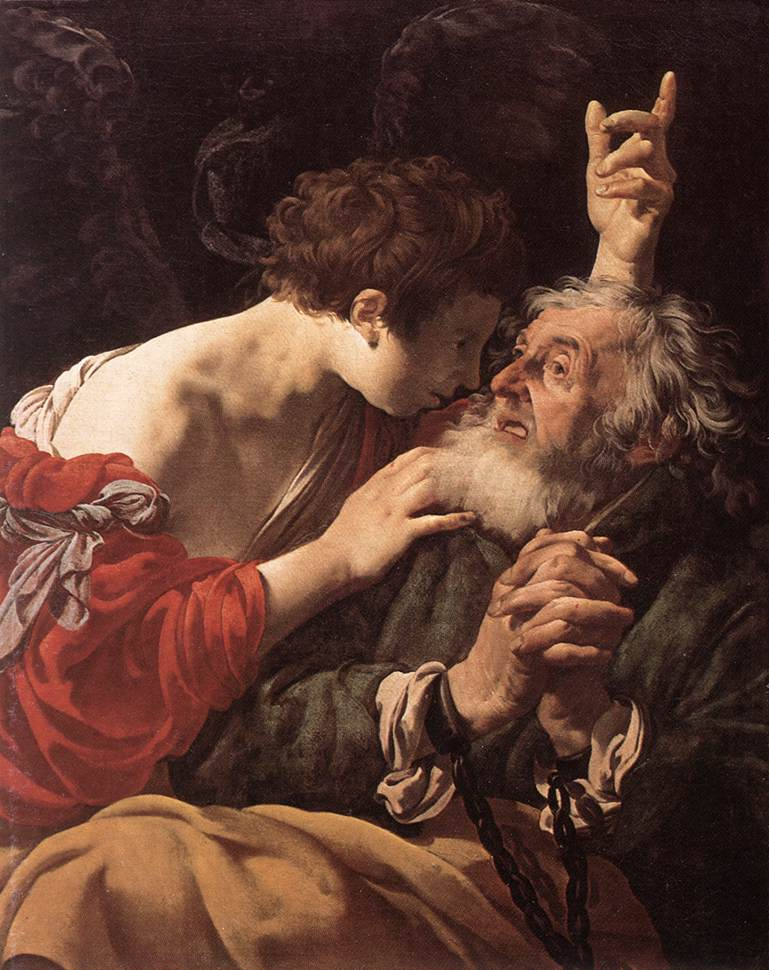
The Liberation of Peter (1624), 104.5 × 86.5 cm, Koninklijk Kabinet van Schilderijen Mauritshuis, The Hague

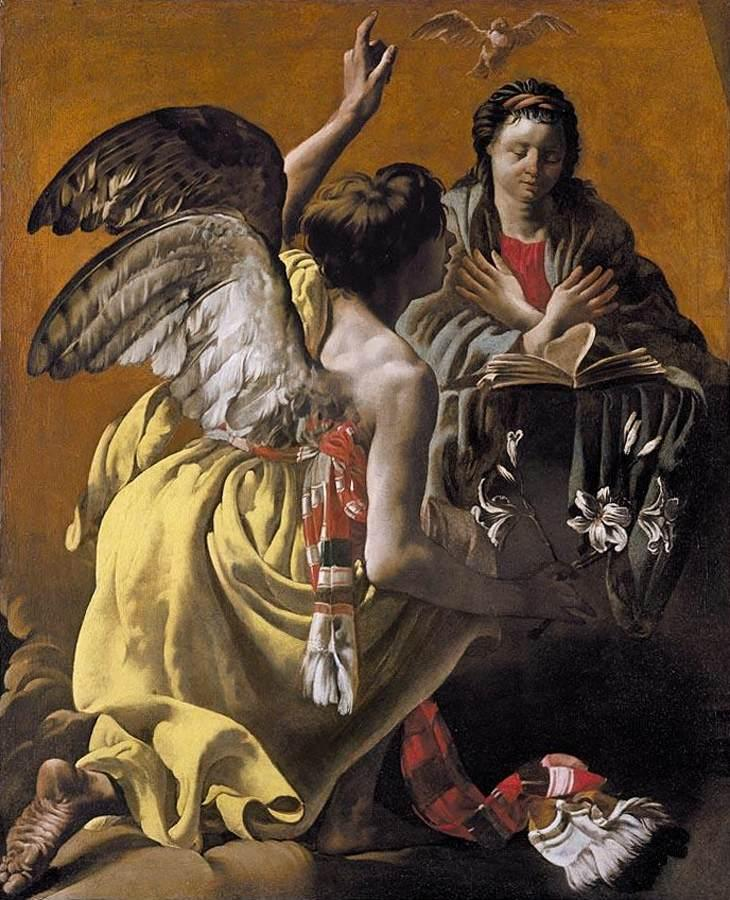
The Annunciation (1624), 134 x 85 cm, Whitfield Fine Art, London, London

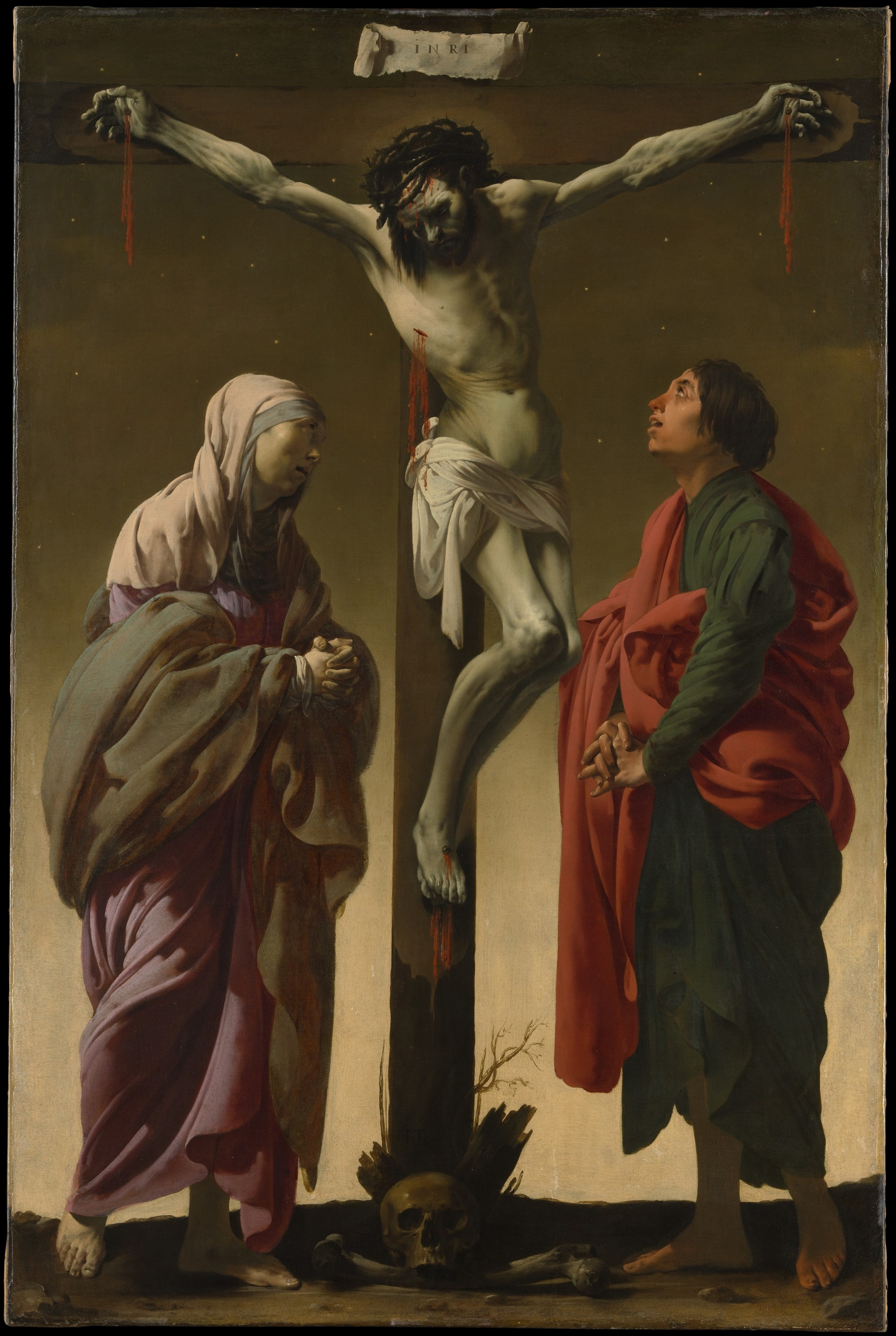
The Crucifixion with the Virgin and St. John, (c. 1625), 154.9 x 102.2 cm, Metropolitan Museum of Art, New York City

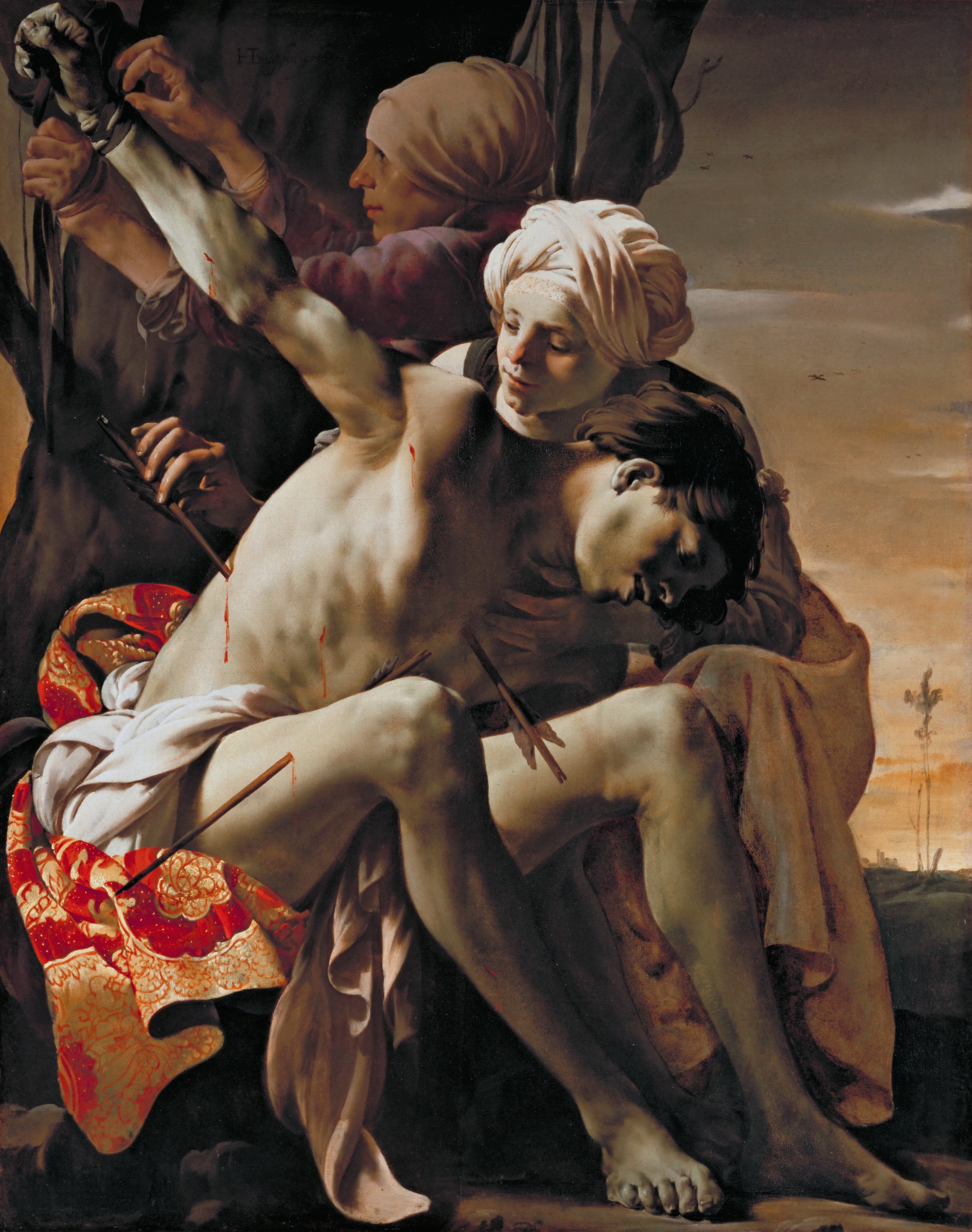
Saint Sebastian Tended by Irene (1625), 149 x 119.4 cm, Allen Memorial Art Museum, Oberlin

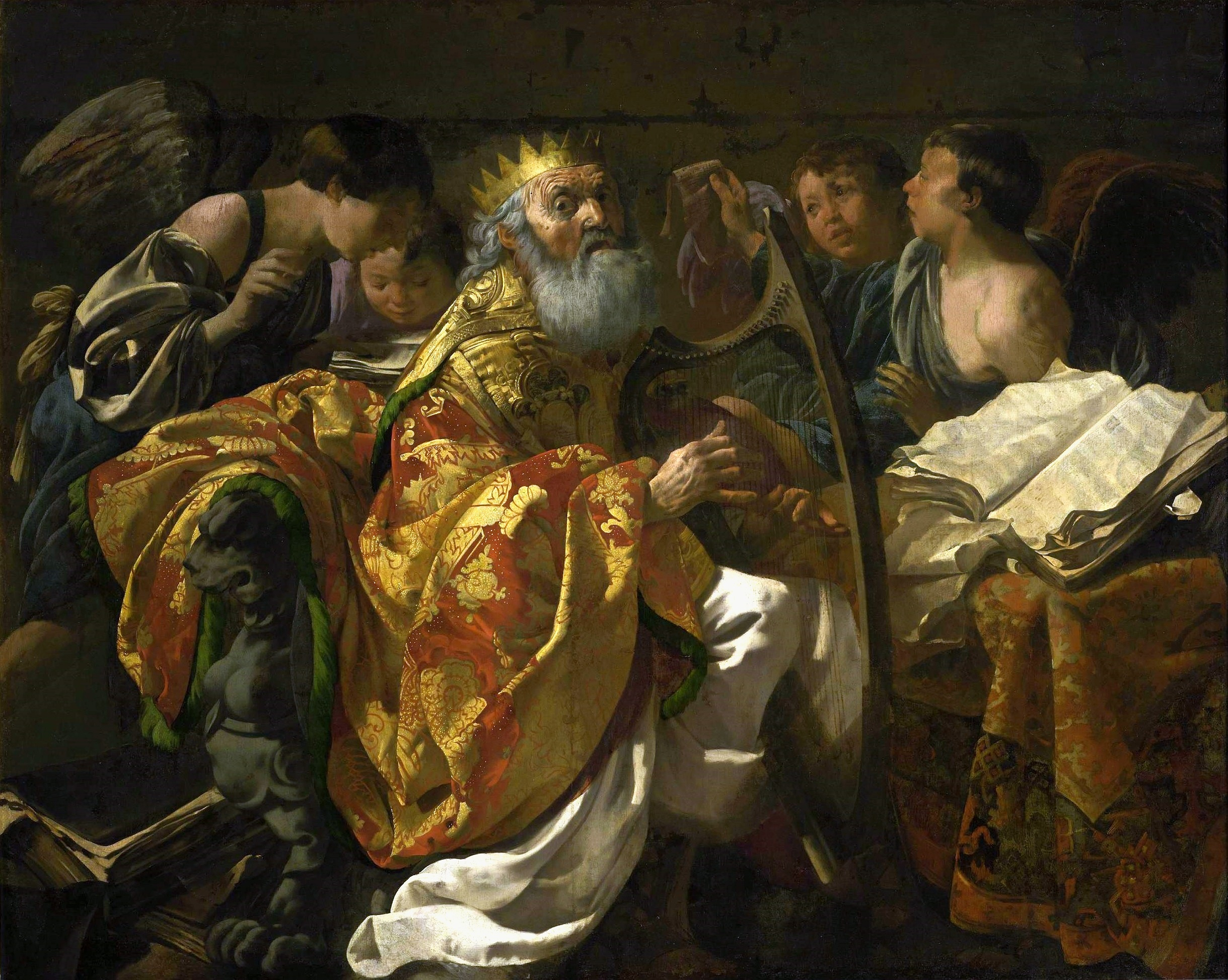
King David Playing the Harp, National Museum in Warsaw

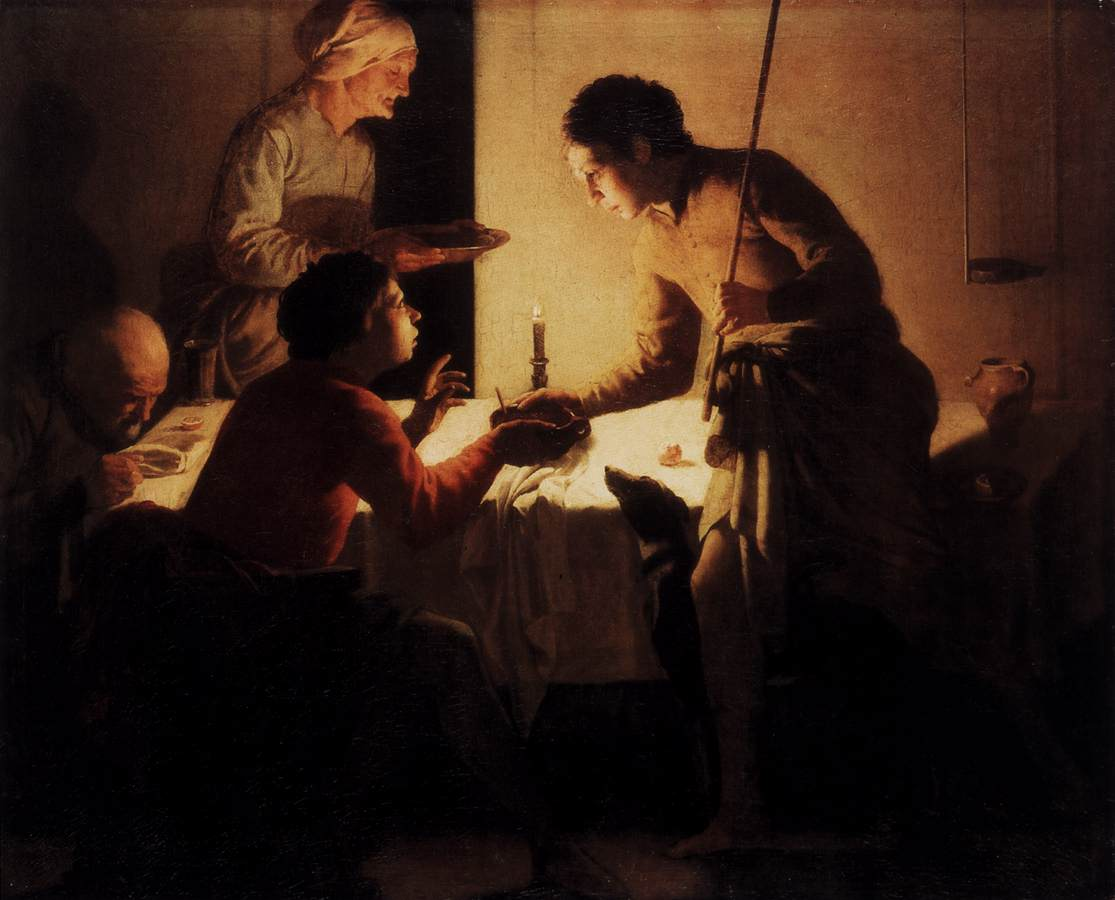
Esau Selling His Birthright (1625), 84.9 x 116.3 cm, Gemäldegalerie, Berlin

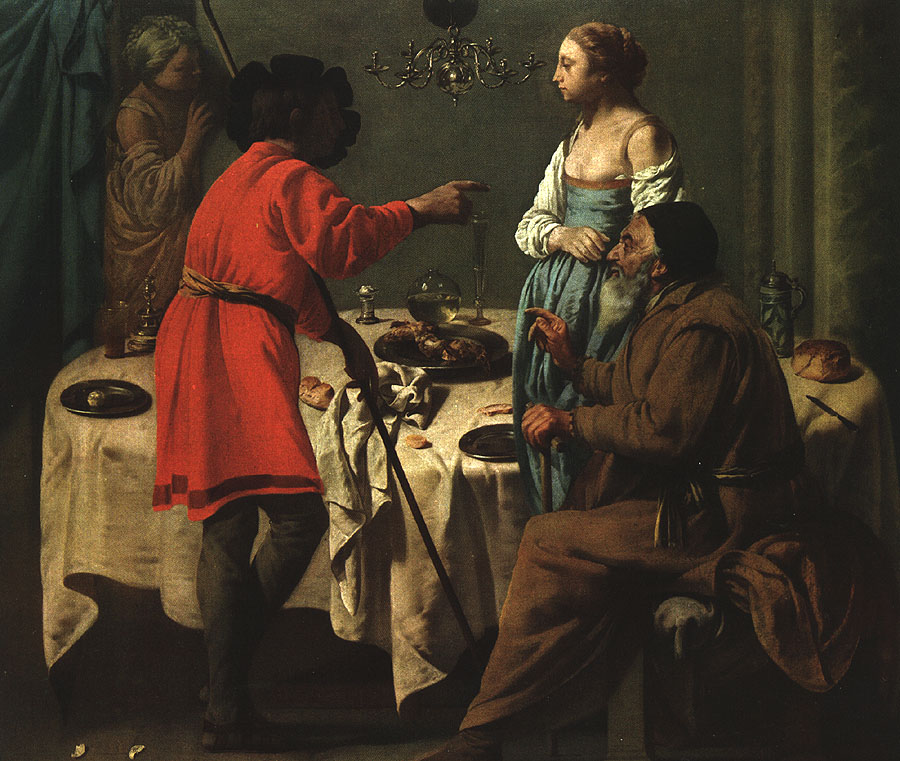
Jacob Reproaching Laban (1627), National Gallery, London

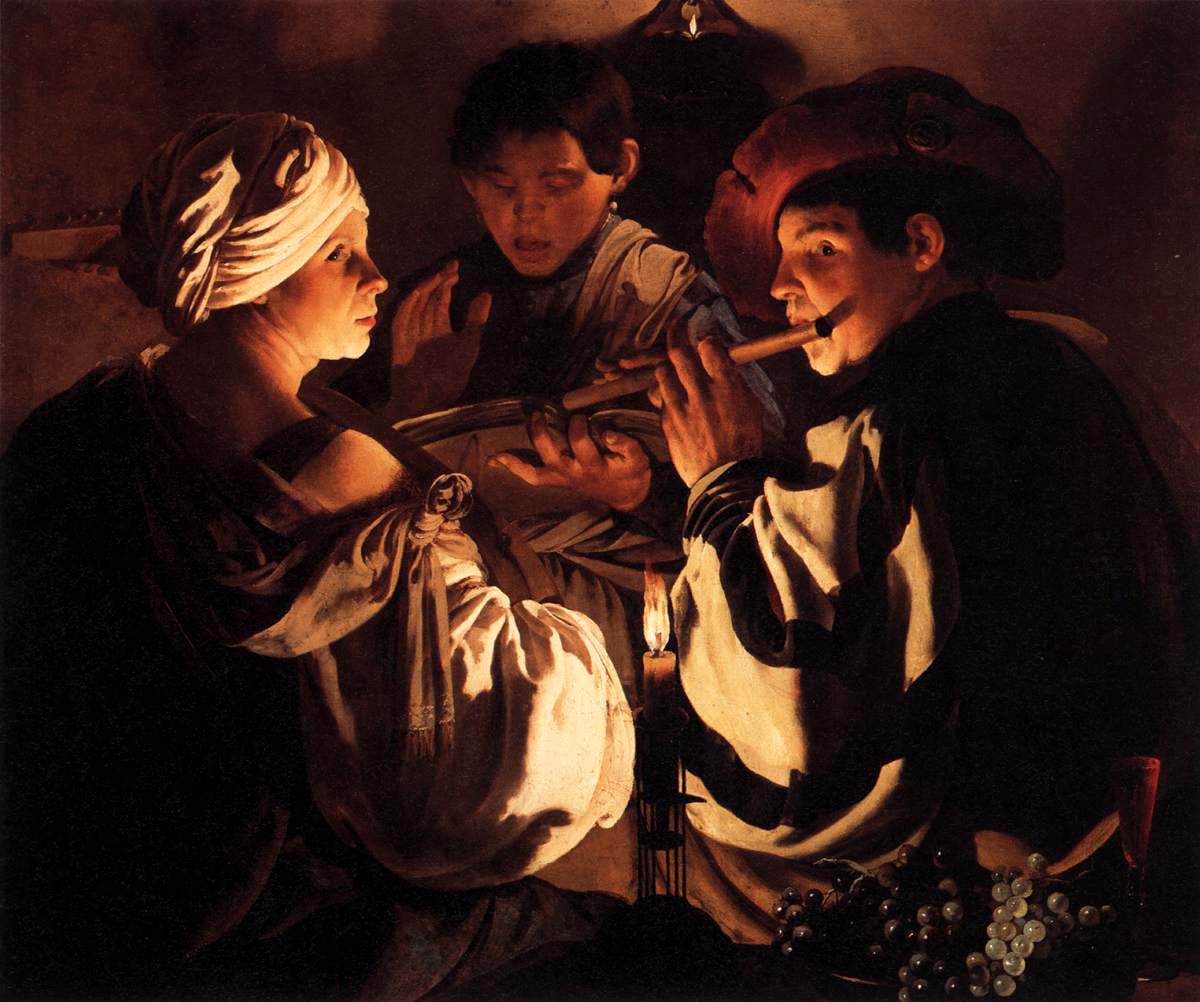
The Concert (1627), 99.1 x 116.8 cm, National Gallery, London

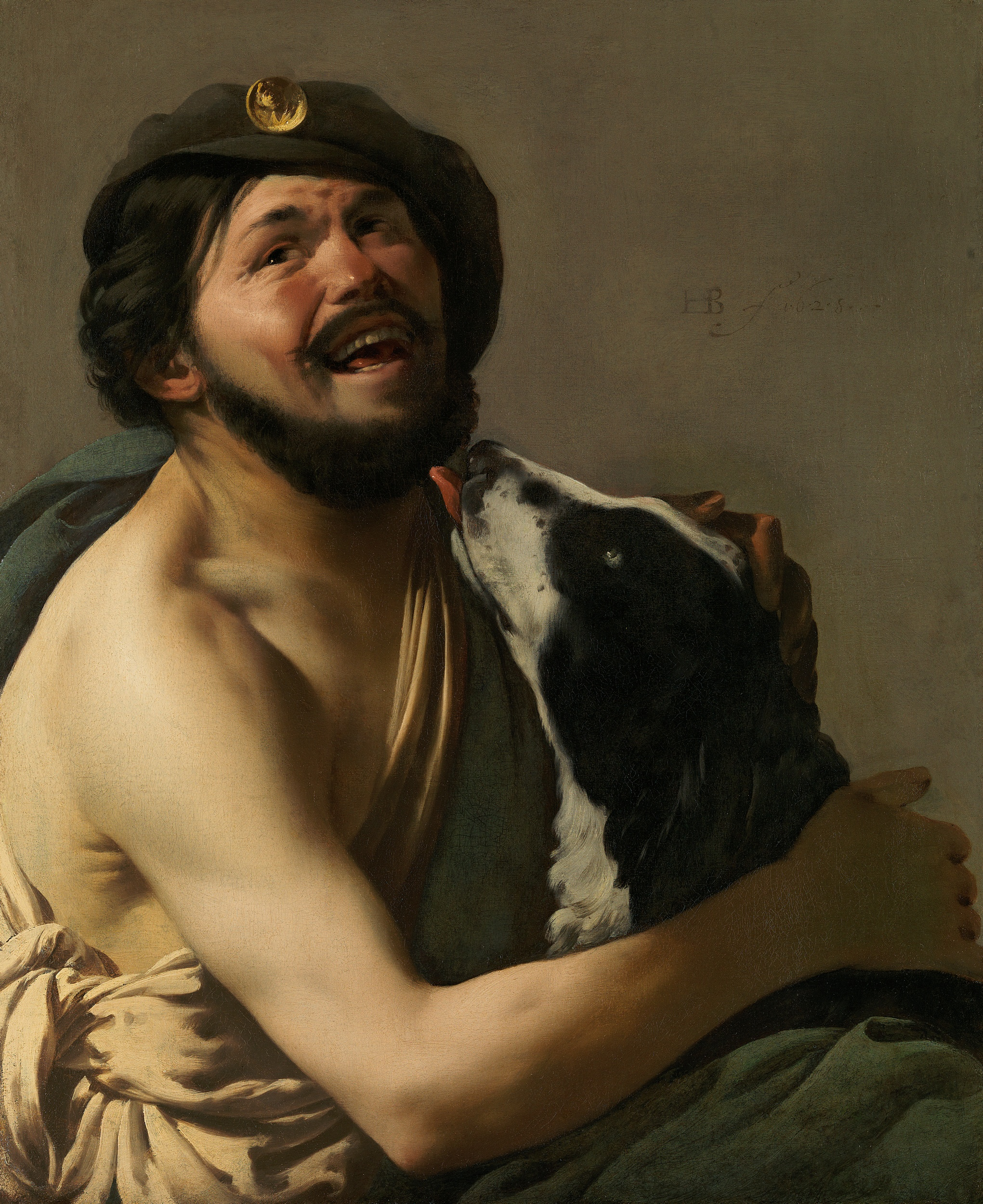
A Laughing Bravo with his Dog (1628)

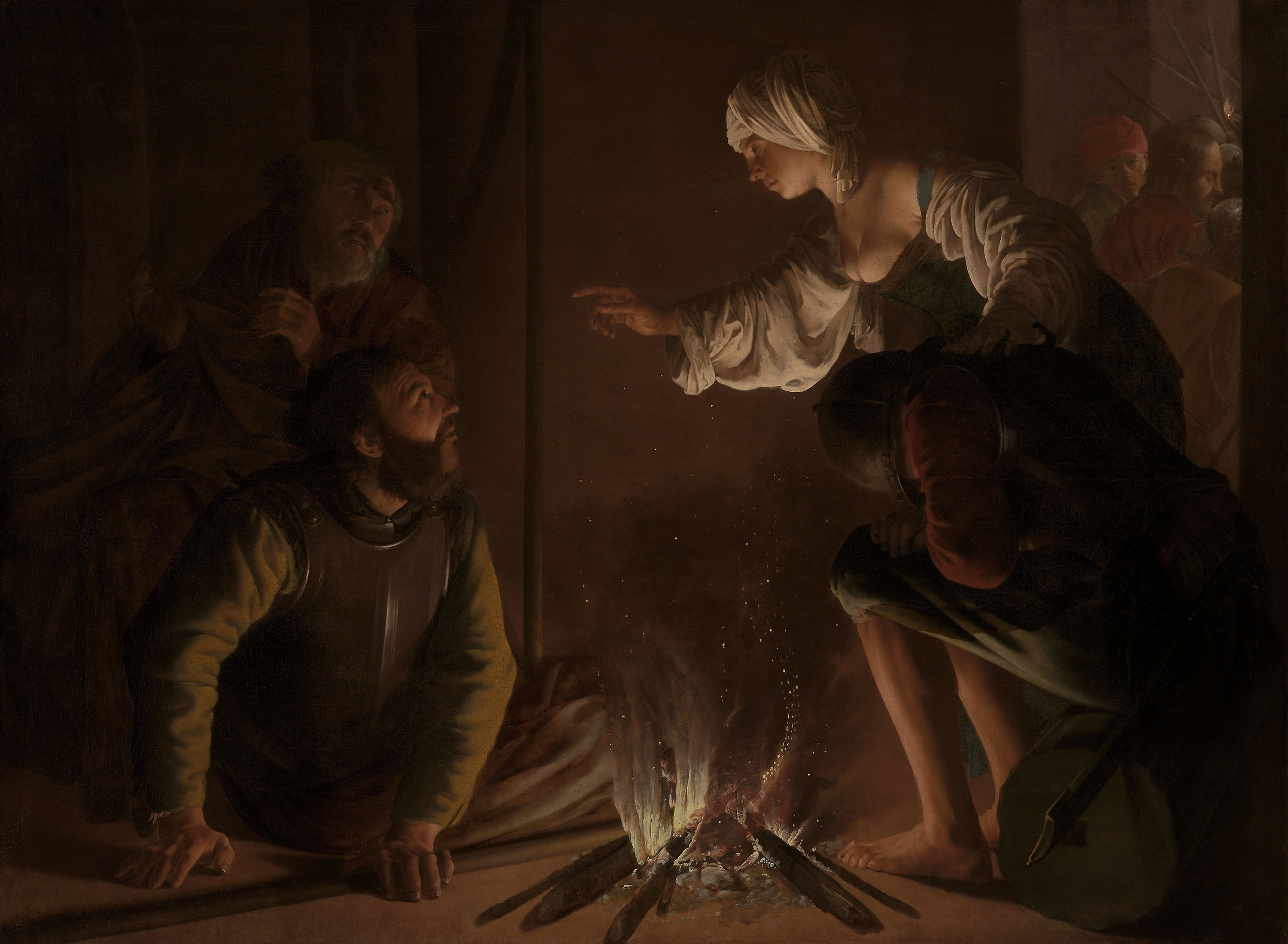
The Denial of St. Peter (1628), 132.3 x 178 cm, Art Institute of Chicago, Chicago

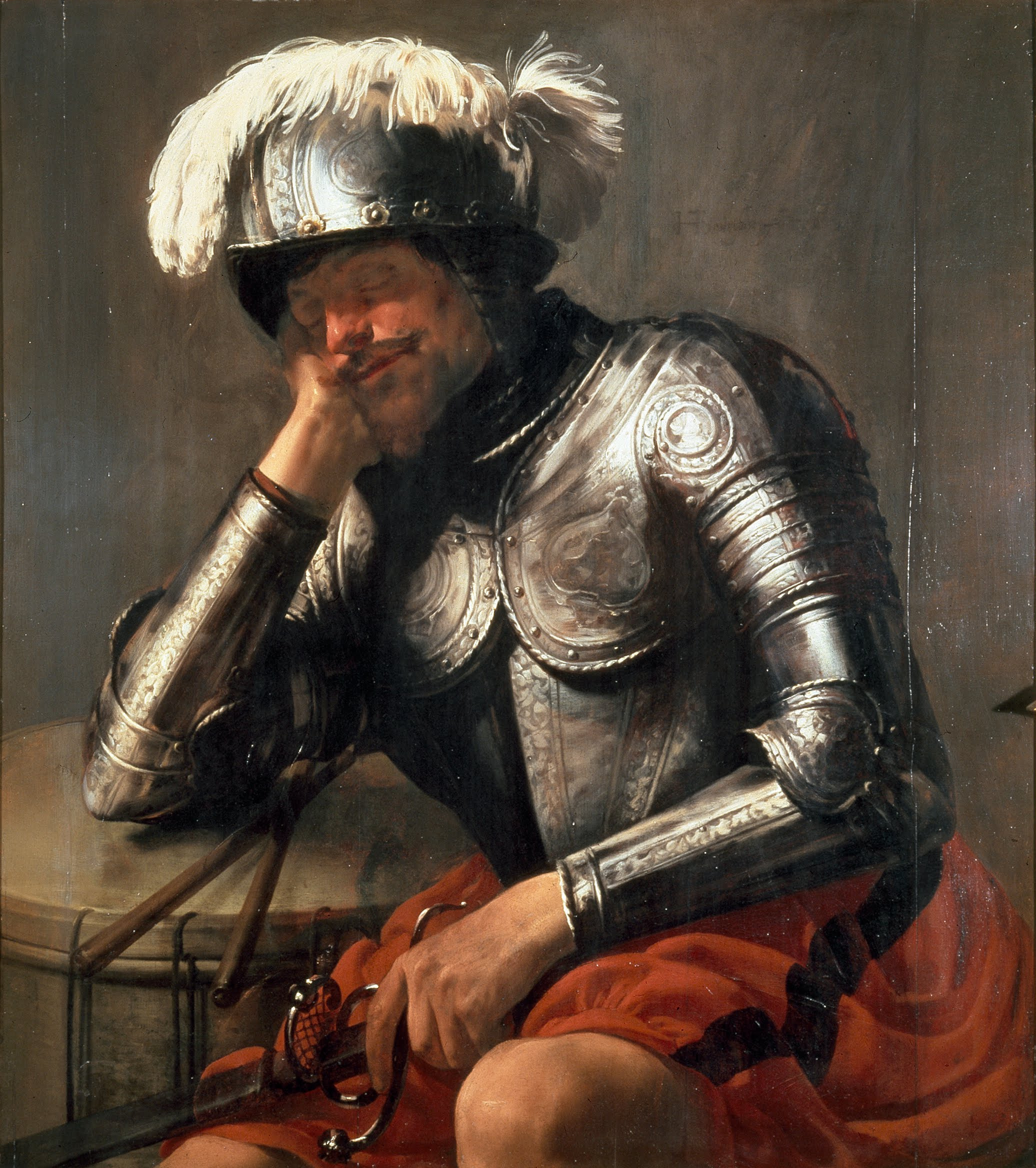
Mars Asleep (1629), 152 x 140 cm, Centraal Museum, Utrecht

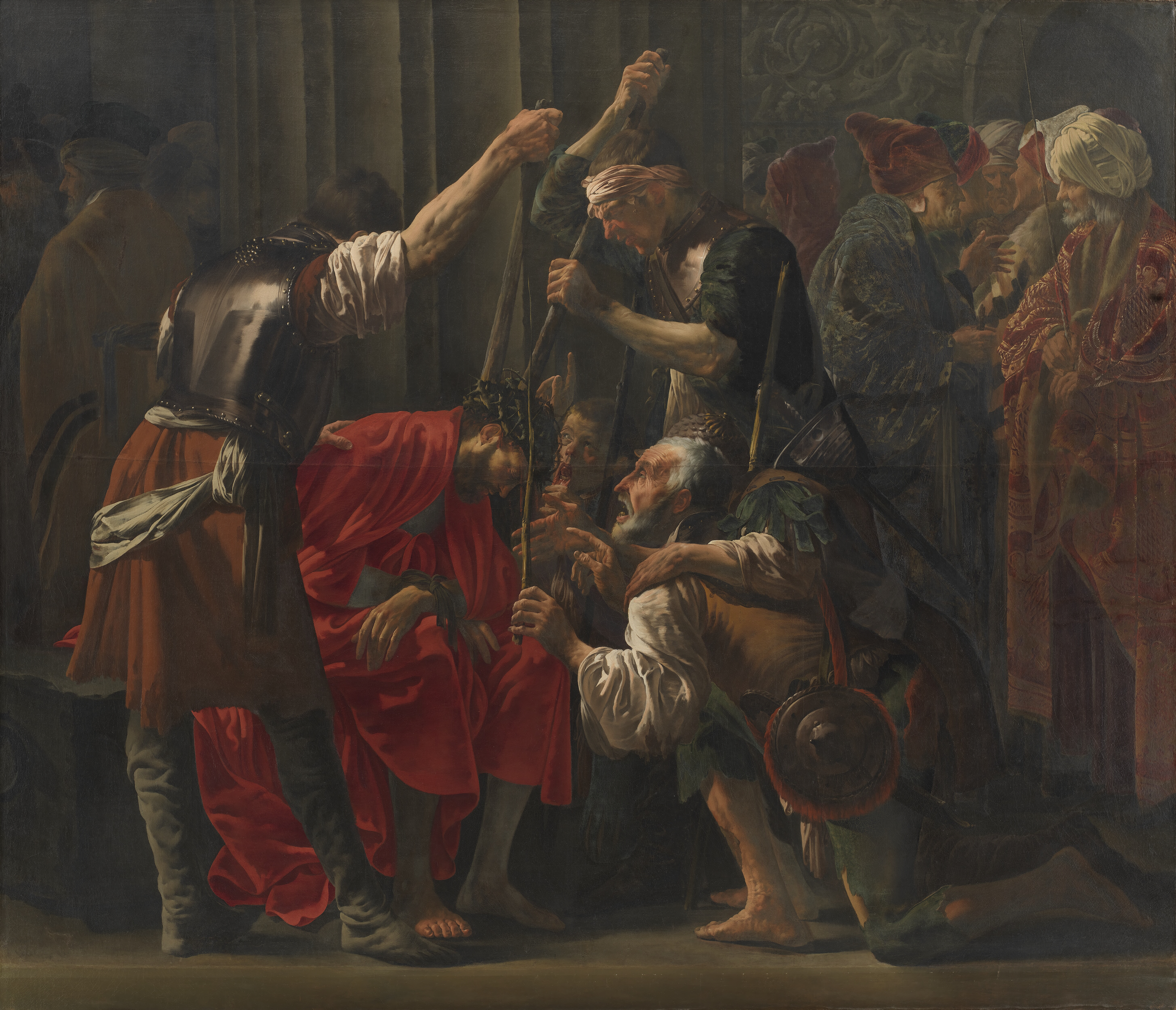
Christ Crowned with Thorns (1620), 207 x 240 cm, Statens Museum for Kunst, Copenhagen
