= Saint Sebastian =

3rd-century Christian saint and martyr

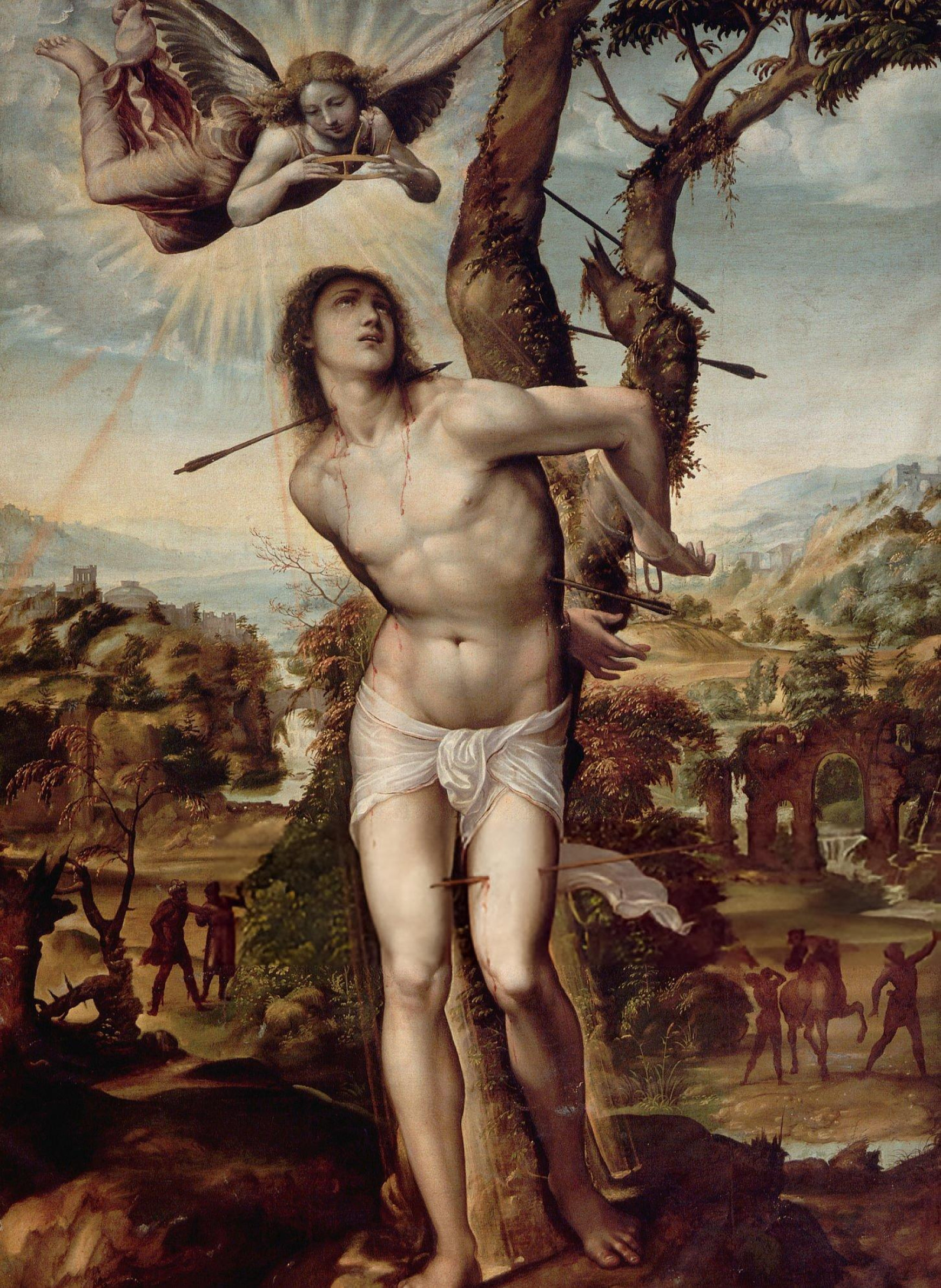
- Martyrdom of Saint Sebastian, by Il Sodoma, c. 1525

Captain of the Praetorian Guard Roman Soldier, Healer and Martyr
- Born: c. AD 255; Narbo Martius, Gallia Narbonensis, Roman Empire
- Died: c. AD 288 (aged approximately 32); Rome, Italia, Roman Empire
- Venerated in: Catholic Church; Eastern Orthodox; Oriental Orthodoxy; Anglicanism; Lutheranism; Old Catholicism
- Major shrine: San Sebastiano fuori le mura Italy
- Feast: 20 January (Catholic), and (Oriental Orthodox); 18 December (Eastern Orthodox); 14/15 February (Ethiopian Orthodox church)
- Attributes: Tied to a post, pillar or a tree, shot by arrows
- Patronage: Soldiers; plague-stricken; archers; disabled peoples; athletes; cyclists; Moratuwa Sri Lanka; Archdiocese of Lipa; Diocese of Tarlac; Diocese of Bacolod; Chiapa de Corzo, Mixtlán, Mexico, Rio de Janeiro, Brazil; Qormi, Malta; Lumban, Laguna, Philippines; Pinagbuhatan, Pasig City, Borbon, Cebu, Philippines; Pucallpa, Peru; Taquaritinga, Brazil; Porto Ferreira, Brazil; Ribeirão Preto, Brazil; Győr, Hungary; Cusco, Peru; Loja, Ecuador; Rome, Italy

Sebastian (Latin: Sebastianus; c. AD 255 – c. AD 288) was an early Christian saint and martyr. According to traditional belief, he was killed during the Diocletianic Persecution of Christians. He was initially tied to a post or tree and shot with arrows, though this did not kill him. He was, according to tradition, rescued and healed by Irene of Rome, which became a popular subject in 17th-century painting. In all versions of the story, shortly after his recovery he went to Diocletian to warn him about his sins, and as a result he was clubbed to death. He is venerated in the Catholic Church and the Eastern Orthodox Church as the patron saint of athletics, archery, and plagues.

The oldest mention of Sebastian's martyrdom is in the Chronograph of 354, which says he is venerated on January 20. He is also mentioned in a sermon on Psalm 118 by 4th-century bishop Ambrose of Milan: in his sermon, Ambrose stated that Sebastian came from Milan and that he was already venerated there at that time. The full account of his martyrdom comes from the Passio Sancti Sebastiani, a 5th-century text written by an anonymous author, possibly Arnobius the Younger.

Sebastian is a popular male saint, especially today among athletes. In medieval times, he was regarded as a saint with a special ability to intercede to protect from plague, and devotion to him greatly increased when plague was active.

== Life ==
There is not much known about Saint Sebastian's early life, but the ancient source mentioning Sebastian is found in the Chronograph of 354, a compilation of chronological and calendrical texts produced in 354 AD by the calligrapher and illustrator Furius Dionysius Filocalus, which mentions him as a martyr who was venerated on January 20. His cult is also mentioned by Ambrose of Milan in his Expositio in Psalmum CXVIII, a theological and exegetical commentary of Psalm 118 dated to 386–390 AD; Ambrose states that Sebastian came from Milan and that he was venerated as a saint there.

The first surviving account of Sebastian's life and death is the Passio Sancti Sebastiani, long thought to have been written by Ambrose in the 4th century, but now regarded as a 5th-century account by an unknown author (possibly Arnobius the Younger). This includes the "two martyrdoms", and the care by Irene in between, and other details that remained part of the story.

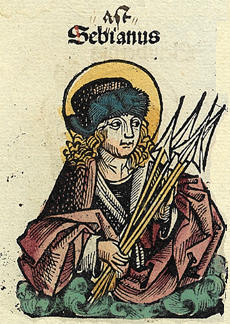
St Sebastian (Sebianus) in the Nuremberg Chronicle

According to Sebastian's 18th-century entry in Acta Sanctorum, still attributed to Ambrose by the 17th-century hagiographer Jean Bolland, and the briefer account in the 14th-century Legenda Aurea, he was a man of Gallia Narbonensis who was taught in Mediolanum (Milan). In 283, Sebastian entered the army in Rome under Emperor Carinus to assist the martyrs. Because of his courage he became one of the captains of the Praetorian Guards under Diocletian and Maximian, who were unaware that he was a Christian.

According to tradition, Marcus and Marcellianus were twin brothers from a distinguished family and were deacons. Both brothers married, and they resided in Rome with their wives and children. The brothers refused to sacrifice to the Roman gods and were arrested. They were visited by their parents Tranquillinus and Martia in prison, who attempted to persuade them to renounce Christianity. Sebastian succeeded in converting Tranquillinus and Martia, as well as Tiburtius, the son of Chromatius, the local prefect. Another official, Nicostratus, and his wife Zoe were also converted. It has been said that Zoe had been a mute for six years; however, she made known to Sebastian her desire to be converted to Christianity. As soon as she had, her speech returned to her. Nicostratus then brought the rest of the prisoners; these 16 persons were converted by Sebastian.

Chromatius and Tiburtius converted; Chromatius set all of his prisoners free from jail, resigned his position, and retired to the country in Campania. Marcus and Marcellianus, after being concealed by a Christian named Castulus, were later martyred, as were Nicostratus, Zoe, and Tiburtius.

=== Martyrdom ===
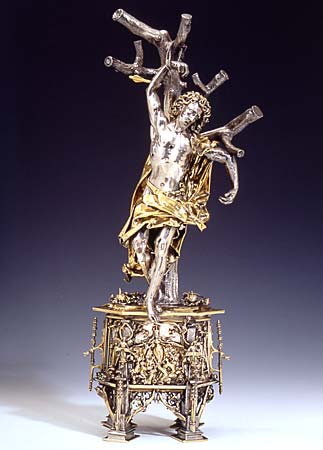
Reliquary of Saint Sebastian, c. 1497 (Victoria and Albert Museum, London)

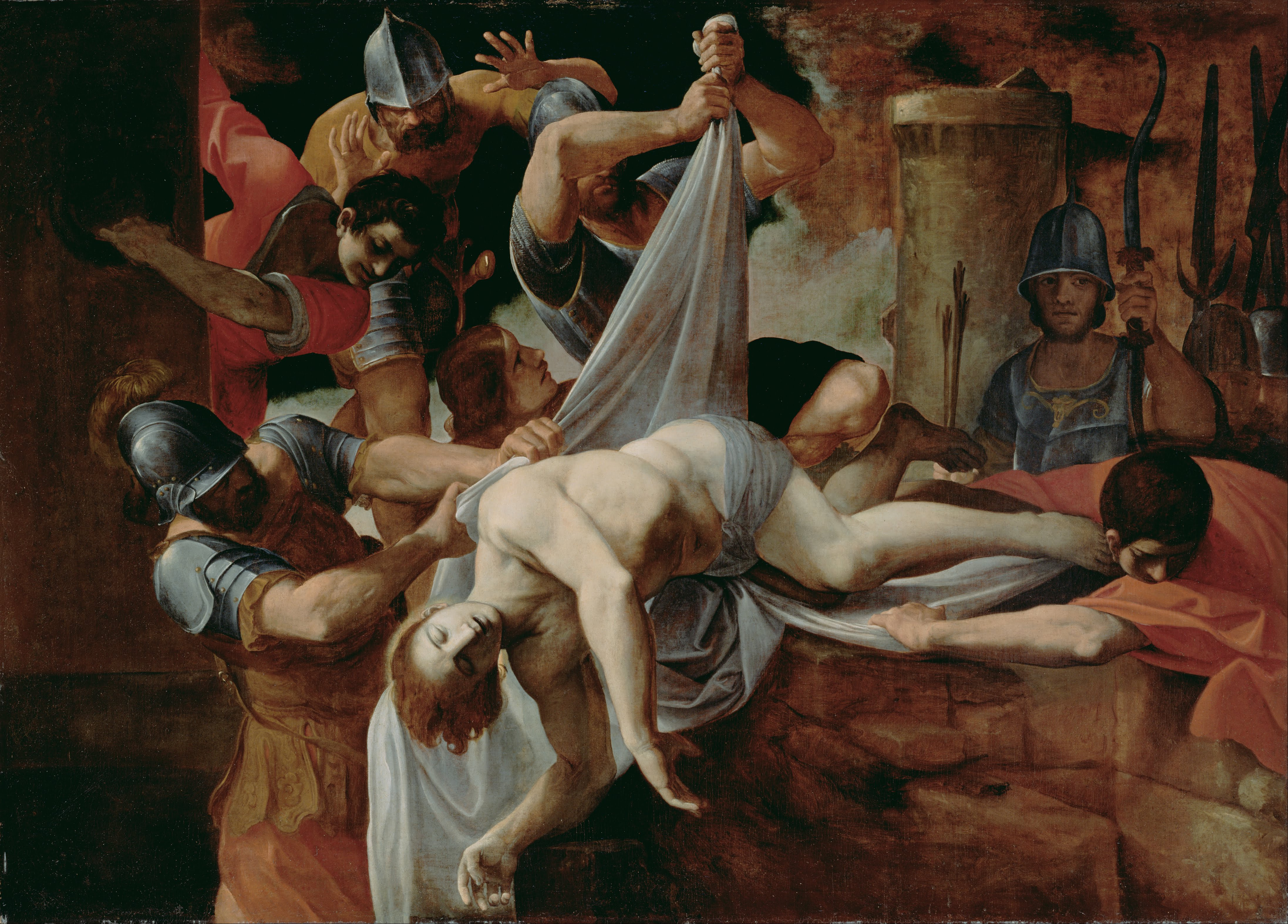
Lodovico Carracci painted St Sebastian Thrown into the Cloaca Maxima for the church at the place where his body was found (1612). The subject is virtually unique.

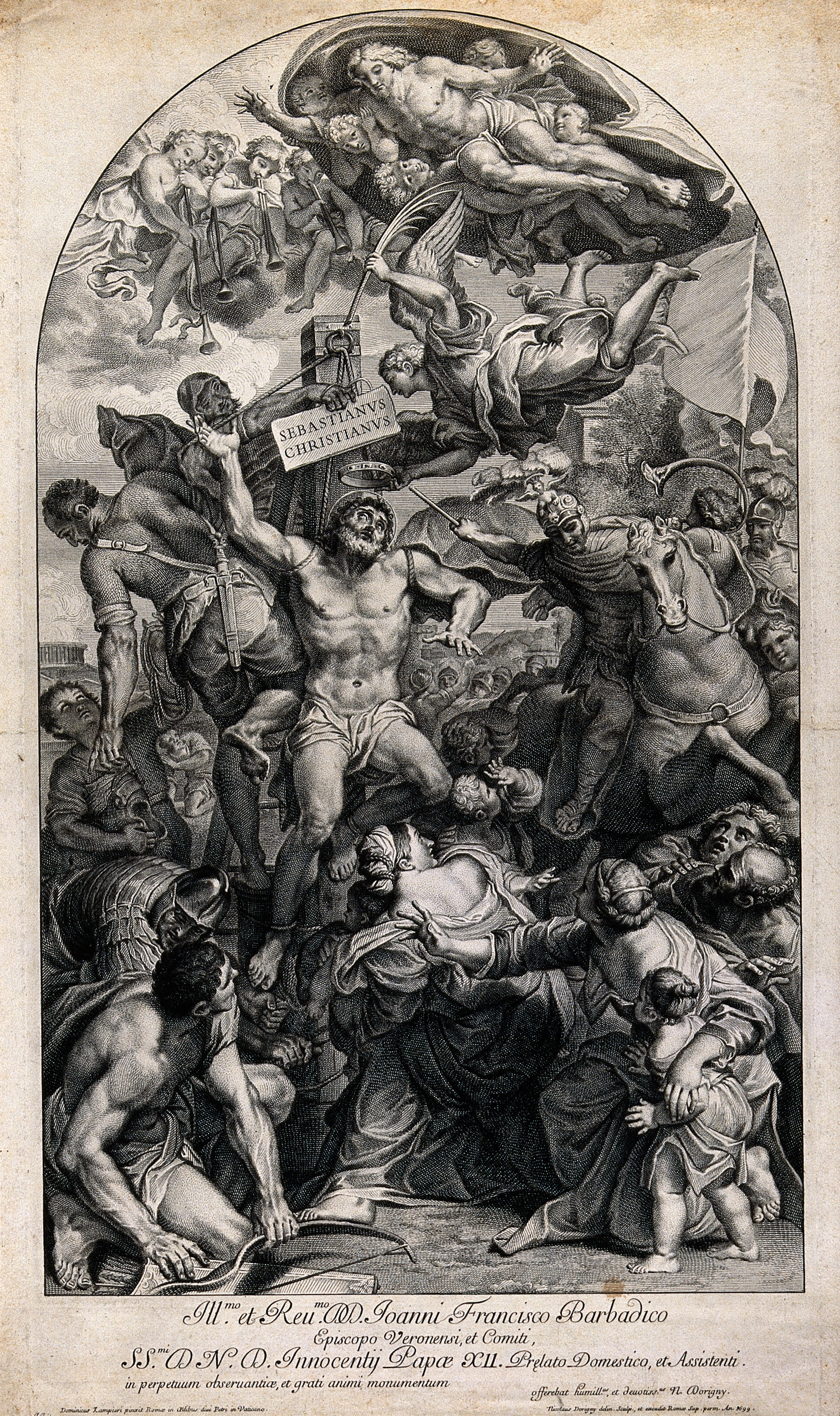
Martyrdom of Saint Sebastian, from a 1699 engraving by N. Dorigny.

According to his legend, Sebastian had prudently concealed his faith, but in 286 it was detected. Diocletian reproached him for his supposed betrayal, and he commanded him to be led to a field and there to be bound to a stake so that the chosen archers from Mauretania would shoot arrows at him. "And the archers shot at him till he was as full of arrows as an urchin (Note: "Urchin" here is the archaic English word for hedgehog, not a sea urchin. The original Latin uses the word "hericius", not "echinus".) is full of pricks, and thus left him there for dead." Miraculously, the arrows did not kill him. The widow of Castulus, Irene of Rome, went to retrieve his body to bury it, and discovered he was still alive. She brought him back to her house and nursed him back to health; Saint Sebastian Tended by Saint Irene became a popular subject in art in the late Renaissance.

In the legend, Sebastian later stood by a staircase where the emperor was to pass and harangued Diocletian for his cruelties against Christians. This freedom of speech, and from a person whom he supposed to have been dead, greatly astonished the emperor; but recovering from his surprise, he gave orders for Sebastian to be seized and beaten to death with cudgels, and his body thrown into the common sewer. A holy lady named Lucina, admonished by the martyr in a vision, privately removed the body and buried it in the catacombs at the entrance of the cemetery of Callixtus, where now stands the Basilica of St. Sebastian.

=== Location of remains ===
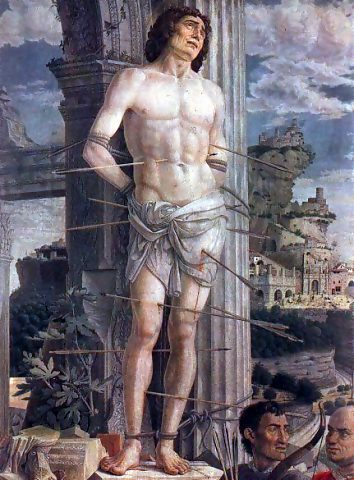
St. Sebastian (detail), Andrea Mantegna, 1480, Musée du Louvre, Paris

Remains reputed to be those of Sebastian are housed in Rome in the Basilica Apostolorum, built by Pope Damasus I in 367 on the site of the provisional tomb of Saints Peter and Paul. The church, today called San Sebastiano fuori le mura, was rebuilt in the 1610s under the patronage of Scipione Borghese.

Ado, Eginard, Sigebert, and other contemporary authors relate that, in the reign of Louis Debonnair, Pope Eugenius II gave the body of Sebastian to Hilduin, Abbot of St. Denys, who brought it into France, and it was deposited at Saint Medard Abbey, at Soissons, on 8 December, in 826.

Sebastian's cranium was brought to the town of Ebersberg (Germany) in 934. A Benedictine abbey was founded there and became one of the most important pilgrimage sites in southern Germany. It is said the silver-encased cranium was used as a cup in which to present the consecrated wine of the Blessed Sacrament to the faithful during the feast of Saint Sebastian.

Reliquary of Saint Sebastian in Ebersberg

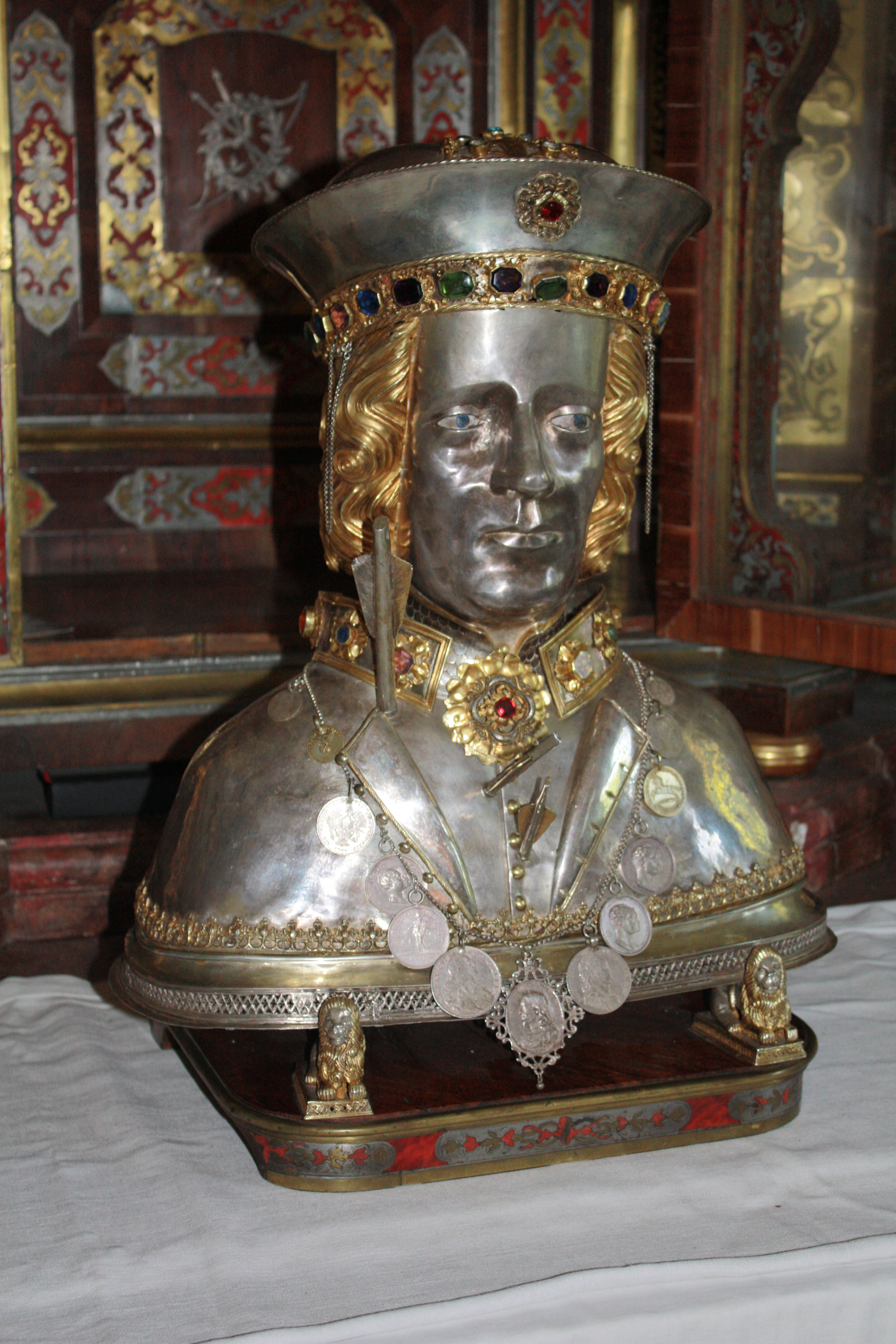
Silver sculpture from 1450

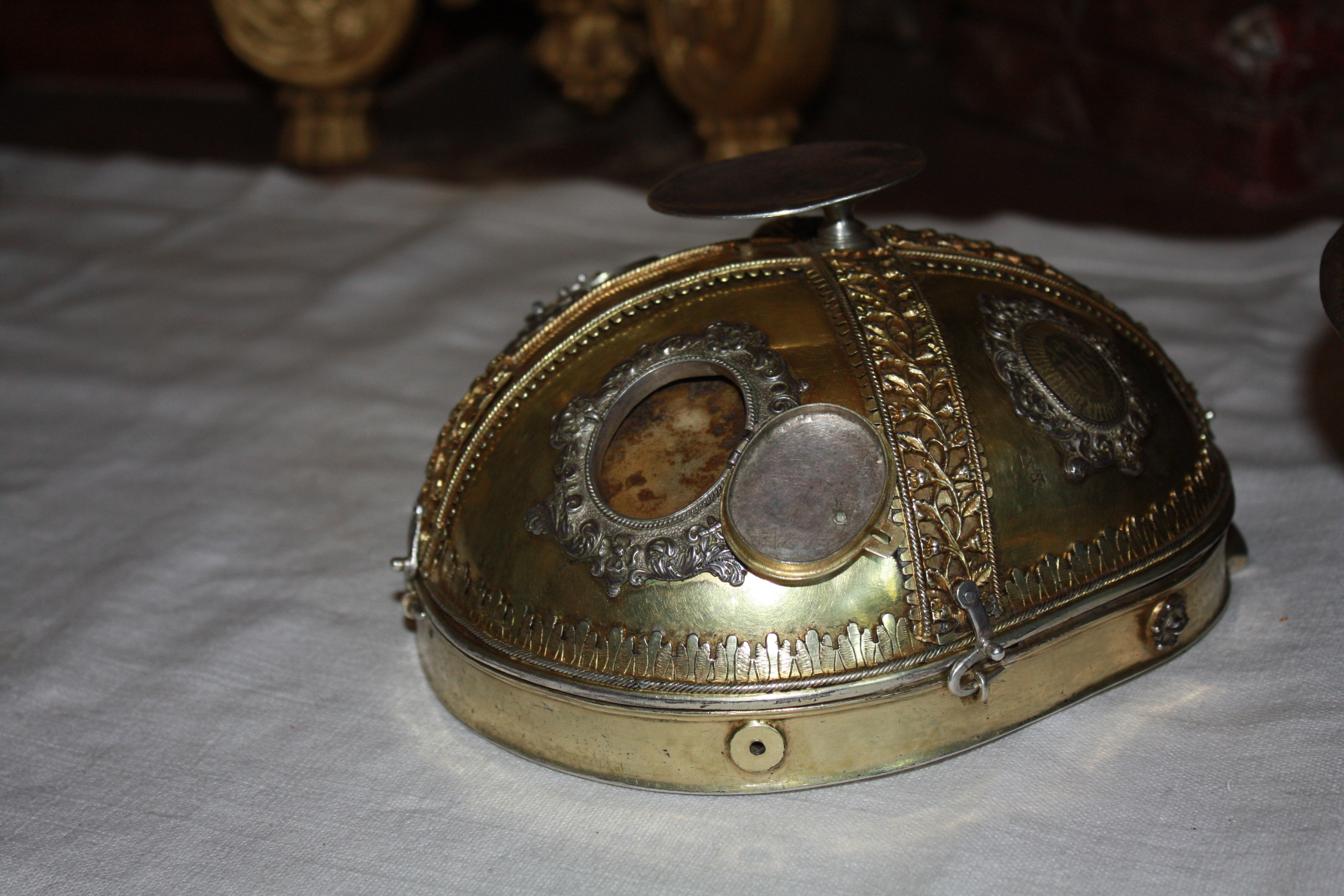
The cranium

== As protector against plague ==
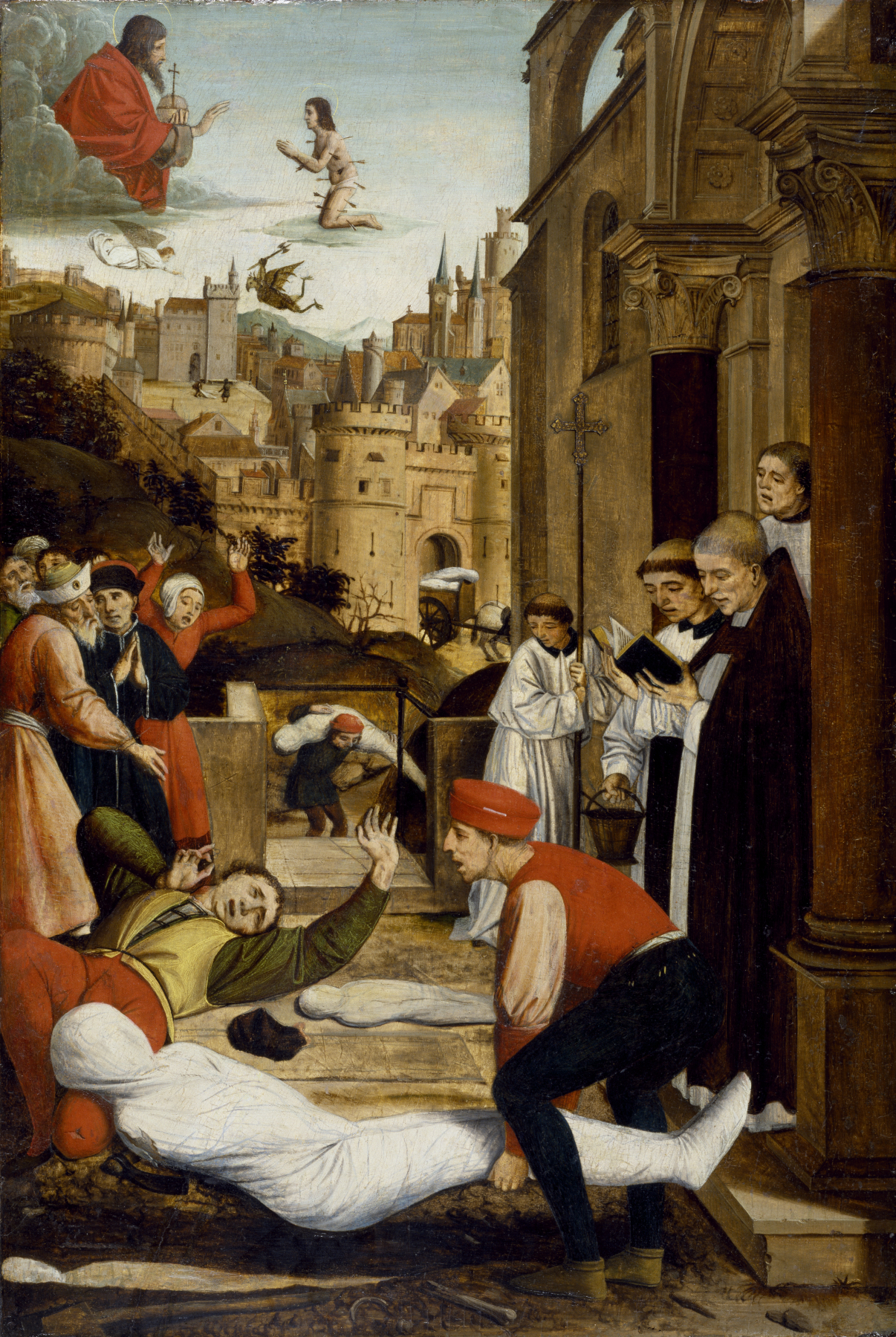
Saint Sebastian Interceding for the Plague Stricken (at top), Josse Lieferinxe, 1497–1499, The Walters Art Museum

The belief that Saint Sebastian was a defense against the plague was a medieval addition to his reputation, which largely accounts for the enormous increase in his importance in the Late Middle Ages. The connection of the martyr shot with arrows with the plague is not an intuitive one. However, the hopeful example of Sebastian being able to recover from his "first martyrdom" (or "sagittation", as it is sometimes called) was relevant as the arrow-wounds can resemble the buboes that were symptoms of bubonic plague. Visually, "the arrow wounds call to God for mercy to us, as the symptoms of the infirm call for pity from the passerby", as Molanus put it.

The chronicler Paul the Deacon relates that, in 680, Rome was freed from a raging pestilence by him. The Golden Legend transmits the episode of a great plague that afflicted the Lombards in the time of King Gumburt, which was stopped by the erection of an altar in honor of Sebastian in the Church of Saint Peter in the Province of Pavia.

== In art and literature ==
=== Art ===
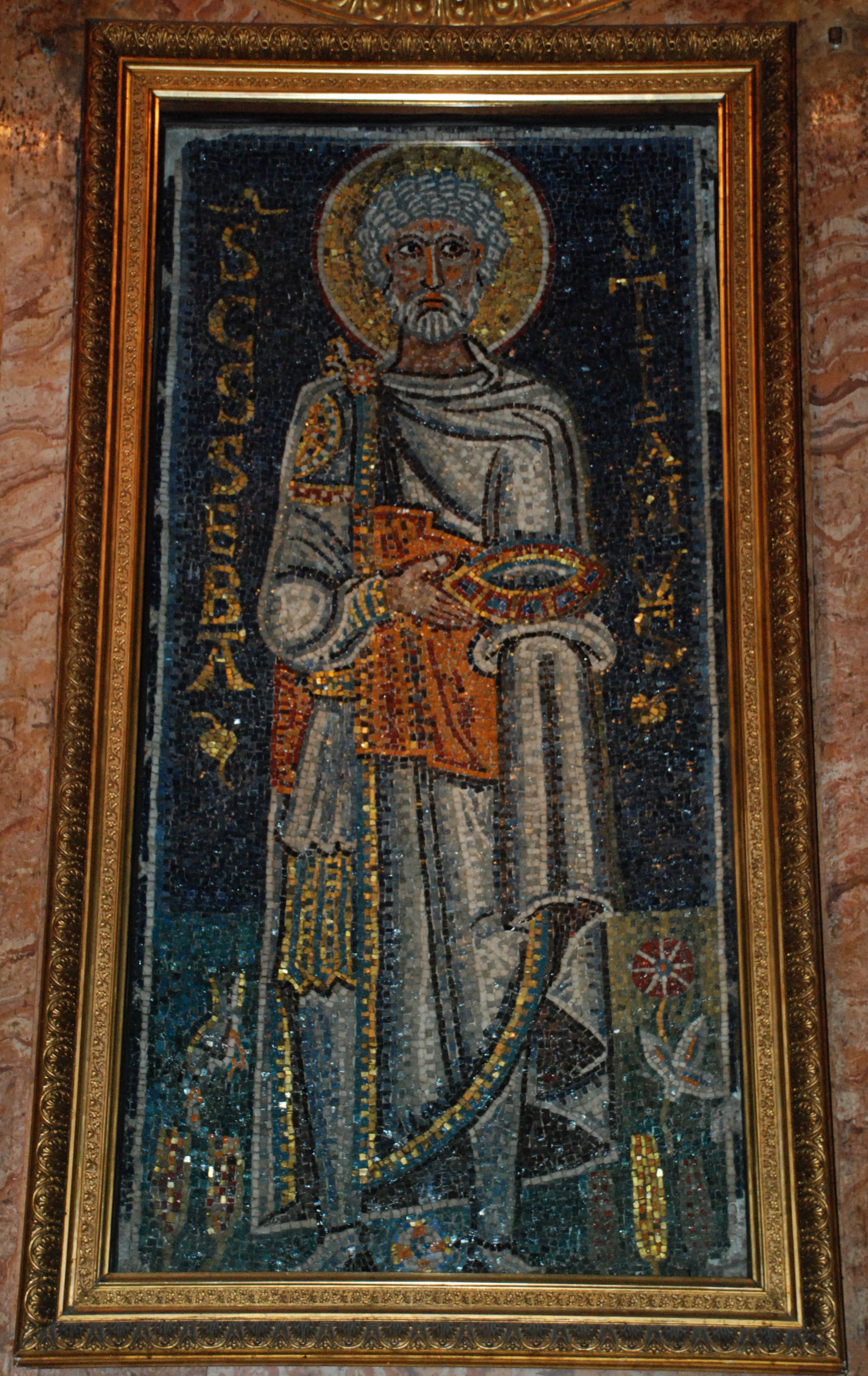
Mosaic in San Pietro in Vincoli, ?682

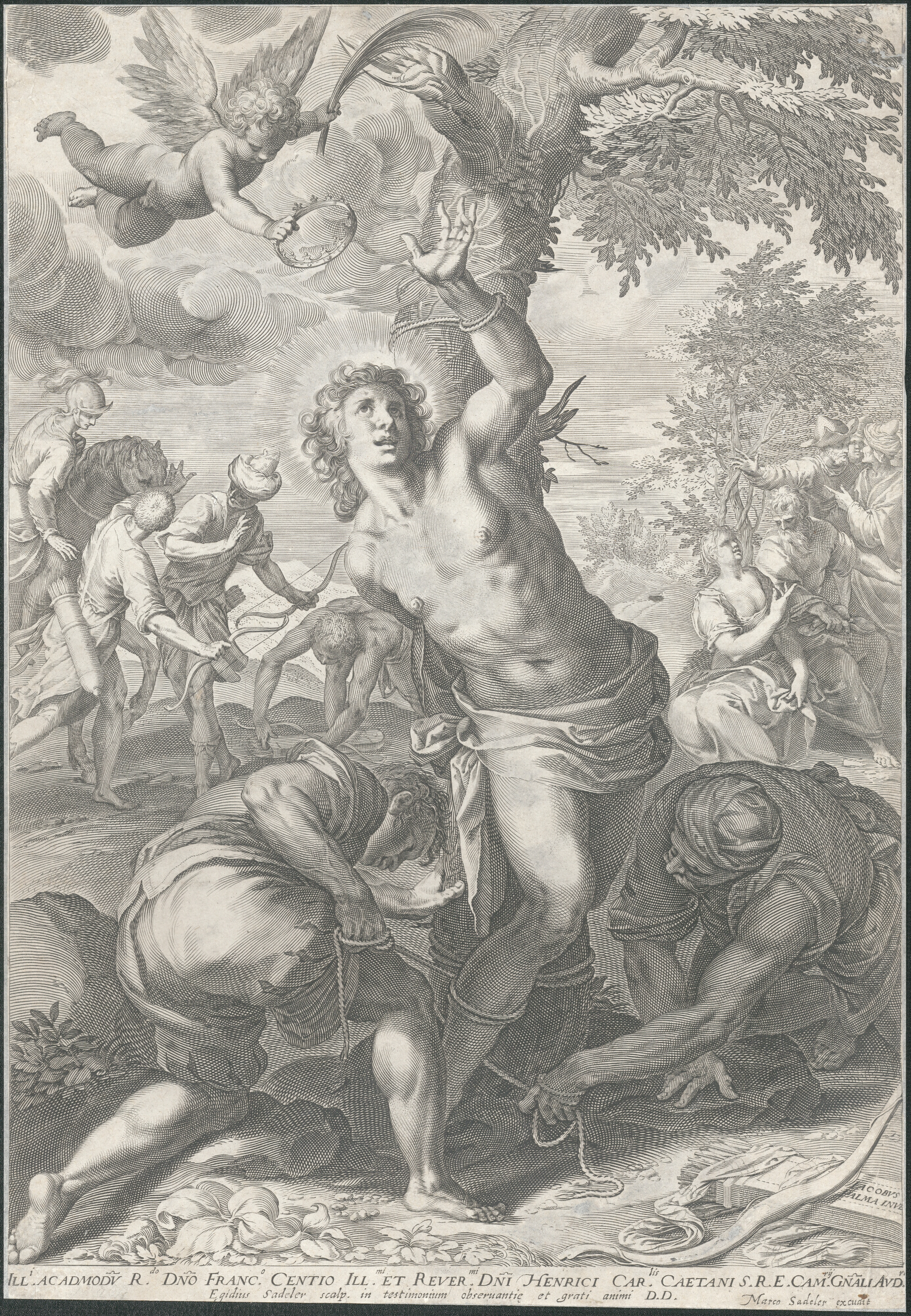
Print of Saint Sebastian, 16th century.

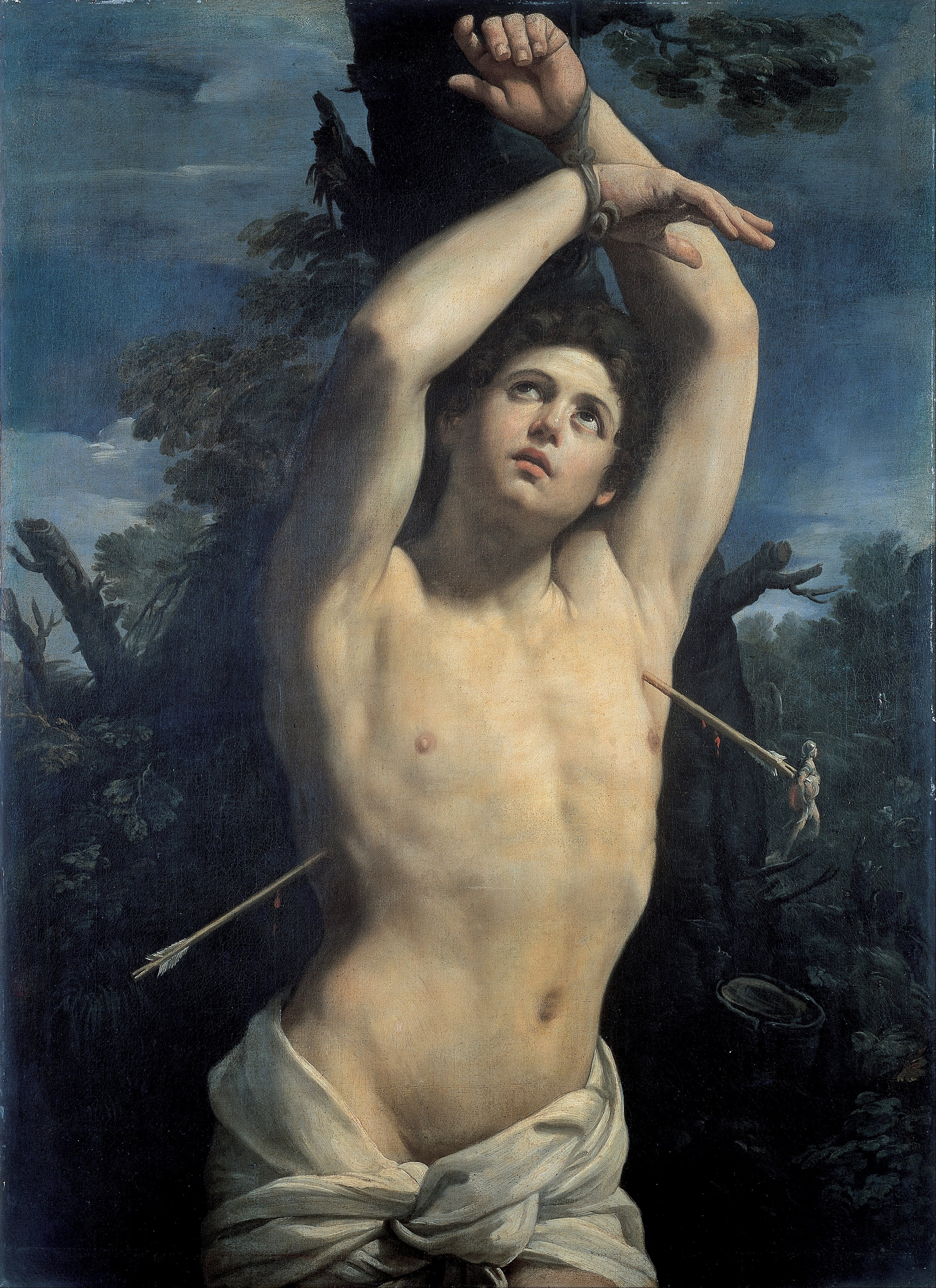
Saint Sebastian by Guido Reni, oil on canvas, circa 1615.

The earliest known representation of Sebastian is a mosaic in the Basilica of Sant'Apollinare Nuovo (Ravenna, Italy) dated between 527 and 565. The right lateral wall of the basilica contains large mosaics representing a procession of 26 martyrs, led by Saint Martin and including Sebastian. The martyrs are represented in Byzantine style, lacking any individuality, and all have identical expressions.

Another early representation is in a mosaic in the Church of San Pietro in Vincoli in Rome, probably made in the year 682. It shows a grown, bearded man in court dress but contains no trace of an arrow. The archers and arrows begin to appear by 1000, and ever since have been far more commonly shown than the actual moment of his death by clubbing, so that there is a popular misperception that this is how he died.

As protector of potential plague victims (a connection popularized by the Golden Legend) and soldiers, Sebastian occupied an important place in the popular medieval mind. He was among the most frequently depicted of all saints by Late Gothic and Renaissance artists, in the period after the Black Death. The opportunity to show a semi-nude young male, often in a contorted pose, also made Sebastian a favorite subject. His shooting with arrows was the subject of the largest engraving by the Master of the Playing Cards in the 1430s, when there were few other current subjects with male nudes other than Christ. Sebastian appears in many other prints and paintings, although this was due to his popularity with the faithful. Among many others, Botticelli, Perugino, Titian, Pollaiuolo, Giovanni Bellini, Guido Reni (who painted the subject seven times), Mantegna (three times), Hans Memling, Gerrit van Honthorst, Luca Signorelli, El Greco, Honoré Daumier, John Singer Sargent and Louise Bourgeois all painted Saint Sebastians. An early work by the sculptor Gianlorenzo Bernini is of Saint Sebastian.

The saint is ordinarily depicted as a handsome youth pierced by arrows. Predella scenes when required often depicted his arrest, confrontation with the Emperor, and final beheading.

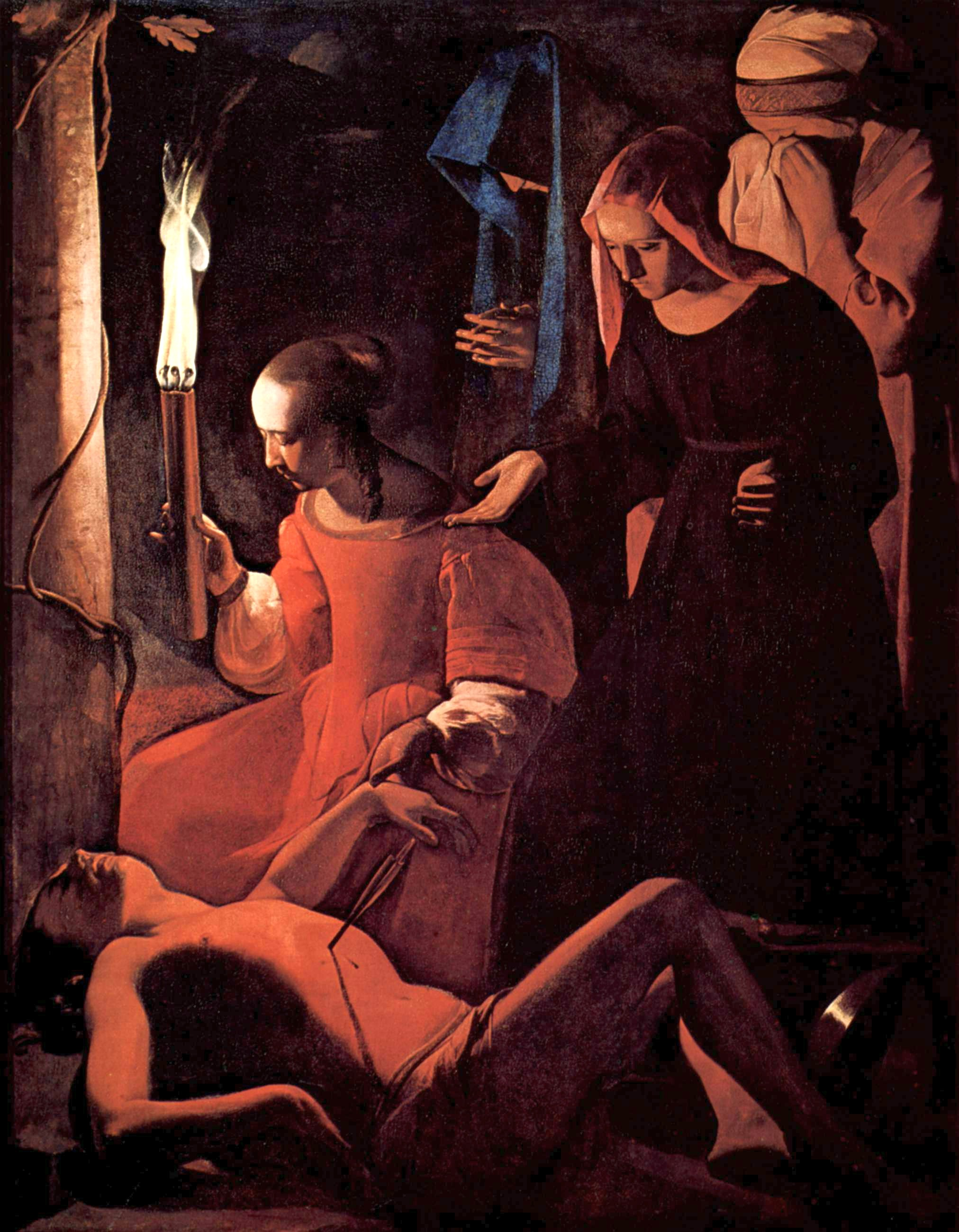
Saint Sebastian Tended by Saint Irene (Georges de La Tour, Louvre), c. 1645

Hans Holbein the Elder created a statuette of Saint Sebastian "in silver and parcel-gilt", now in the Victoria and Albert Museum in London.

A mainly 17th-century subject, though found in predella scenes as early as the 15th century, was Saint Sebastian Tended by Saint Irene, painted by Georges de La Tour, Trophime Bigot (four times), Jusepe de Ribera, Hendrick ter Brugghen (in perhaps his masterpiece) and others. This may have been a deliberate attempt by the Church to get away from the single nude subject, which is already recorded in Vasari as sometimes arousing inappropriate thoughts among churchgoers. The Baroque artists usually treated it as a nocturnal chiaroscuro scene, illuminated by a single candle, torch or lantern, in the style fashionable in the first half of the 17th century. There exist several cycles depicting the life of Sebastian. Among them are the frescos in the basilica church of San Sebastiano, Acireale in Sicily painted by Pietro Paolo Vasta.

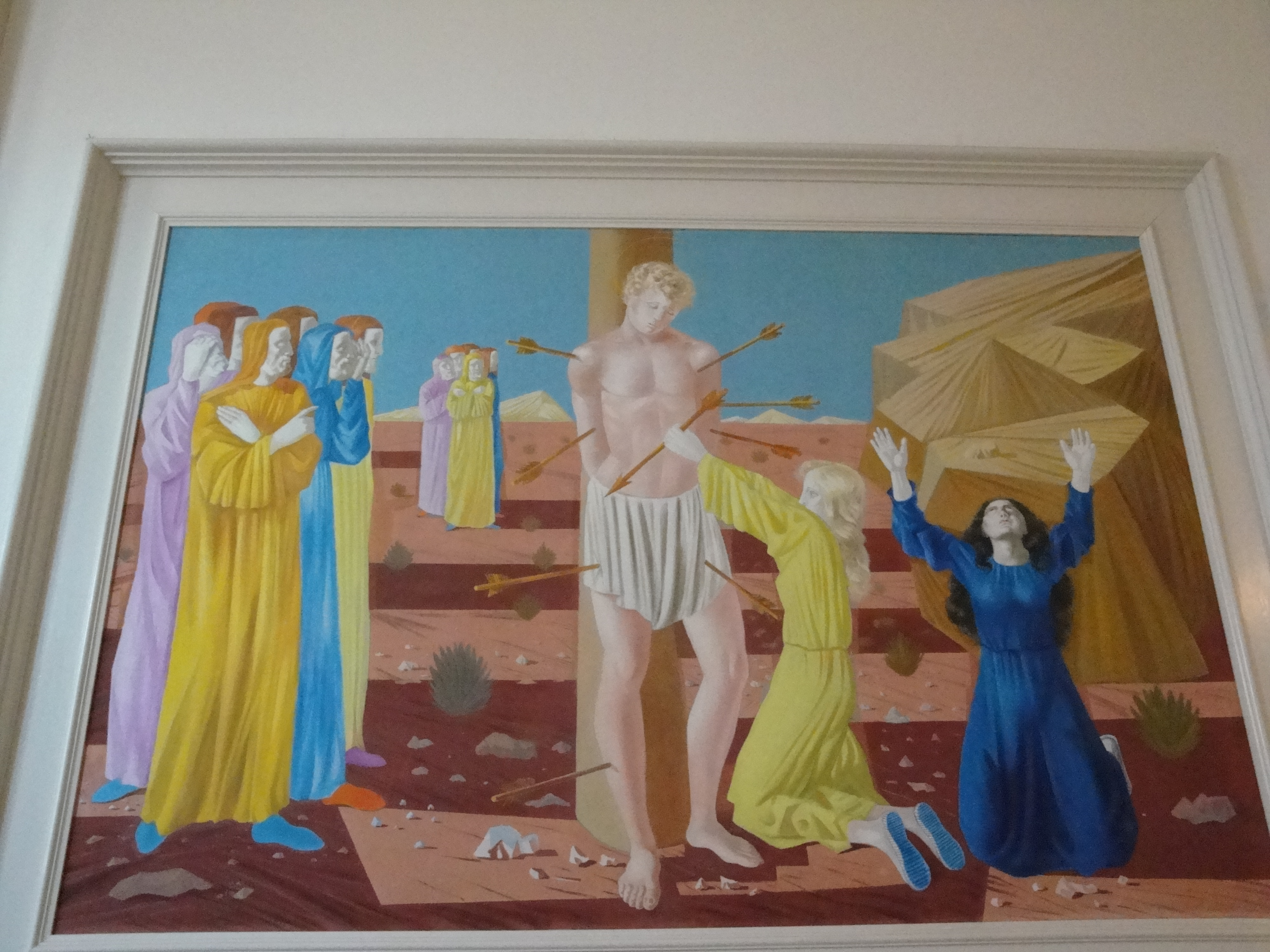
Martyrdom of Saint Sebastian, by Candido Portinari, 1952

Egon Schiele, an Austrian Expressionist artist, painted a self-portrait as Saint Sebastian in 1915. Candido Portinari, a Brazilian Modernist artist, painted a version of the Martyrdom of Saint Sebastian in 1952.

=== Literature, fiction, and music ===
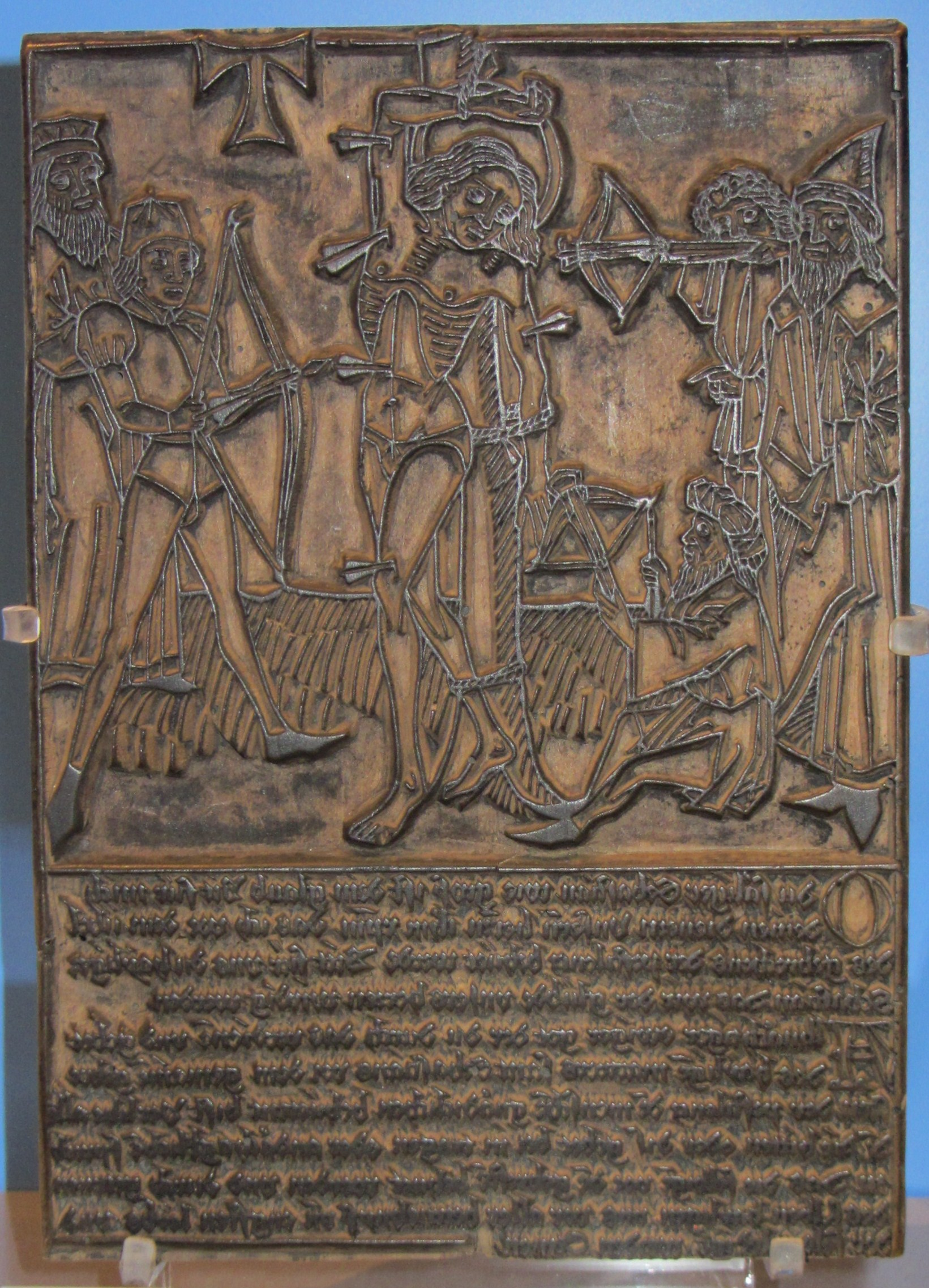
Woodblock of St. Sebastian from South Germany, c. 1470–1475

In 1911, the Italian playwright Gabriele d'Annunzio in conjunction with Claude Debussy produced Le Martyre de saint Sébastien. The American composer Gian Carlo Menotti composed a ballet score for a Ballets Russes production which was first given in 1944. In his novella Death in Venice, Thomas Mann hails the "Sebastian-Figure" as the supreme emblem of Apollonian beauty, that is, the artistry of differentiated forms; beauty as measured by discipline, proportion, and luminous distinctions. This allusion to Sebastian's suffering, associated with the writerly professionalism of the novella's protagonist, Gustav Aschenbach, provides a model for the "heroism born of weakness", which characterizes poise amidst agonizing torment and plain acceptance of one's fate as, beyond mere patience and passivity, a stylized achievement and artistic triumph.

Sebastian's death was depicted in the 1949 film Fabiola, in which he was played by Massimo Girotti. In 1964, Frank O'Hara published Lunch Poems (City Lights Books), including his famous "Having a Coke With You", in which he says his beloved looks "like a better happier St. Sebastian." In 1976, the British director Derek Jarman made a film, Sebastiane, which caused controversy in its treatment of the martyr as a "homosexual icon", according to a number of critics reflecting a subtext perceptible in the imagery since the Renaissance. Also in 1976, in the American horror film Carrie, a figure of Saint Sebastian (commonly misconstrued as a figure of the crucified Christ) appears in Carrie's prayer closet.

A depiction of Saint Sebastian in a fresco restoration in an isolated Italian village is the central motif and cryptic mystery of the 1976 giallo horror film The House with Laughing Windows.

The music video for the 1991 R.E.M. song Losing My Religion briefly features imagery of Saint Sebastian at 1:10, 3:18, 4:05, and 4:24, but with arrows that are clearly attached with tape.

In 1997, the eighth episode of the second season of the television series Millennium, the protagonists search for the hand of Saint Sebastian.

An albarello with the depiction of Saint Sebastian's Martyrdom c.1600s Sicily (Gardiner Museum, Toronto)

In 2007, artist Damien Hirst presented Saint Sebastian, Exquisite Pain from his Natural History series. The piece depicts a cow in formaldehyde, bound in metal cable and shot with arrows.

British pop band Alt-J's video for "Hunger of the Pine" contains references to the story of Saint Sebastian's death, adapted to fit the lyrics of the song. Tarsem Singh's video for the R.E.M. song "Losing My Religion" makes use of imagery of Saint Sebastian, drawing particular inspiration from paintings by Guido Reni and Caravaggio. The indie folk band the Mountain Goats have a song called "Hail, St. Sebastian" that makes reference to his life. Scottish musician Momus has a song "Lucky like St Sebastian", featuring on his 1986 debut album Circus Maximus.

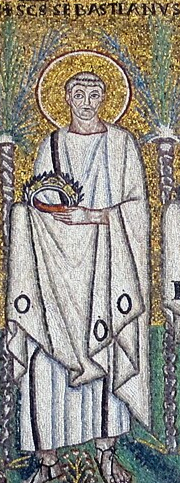
Mosaic of Saint Sebastian from the Basilica of Sant'Apollinare Nuovo in Ravenna

Madonna's song "I'm a Sinner" from her 2012 album MDNA has a segment resembling a litany, including the line, "St. Sebastian, don't you cry; let those poisoned arrows fly."

The 2013–2018 Canadian drama series Forgive Me centres on a priest haunted by recurring visions of Saint Sebastian.

The look of the character Gemino in the popular action-platform videogame Blasphemous is clearly inspired by Saint Sebastian.

== Patronage ==
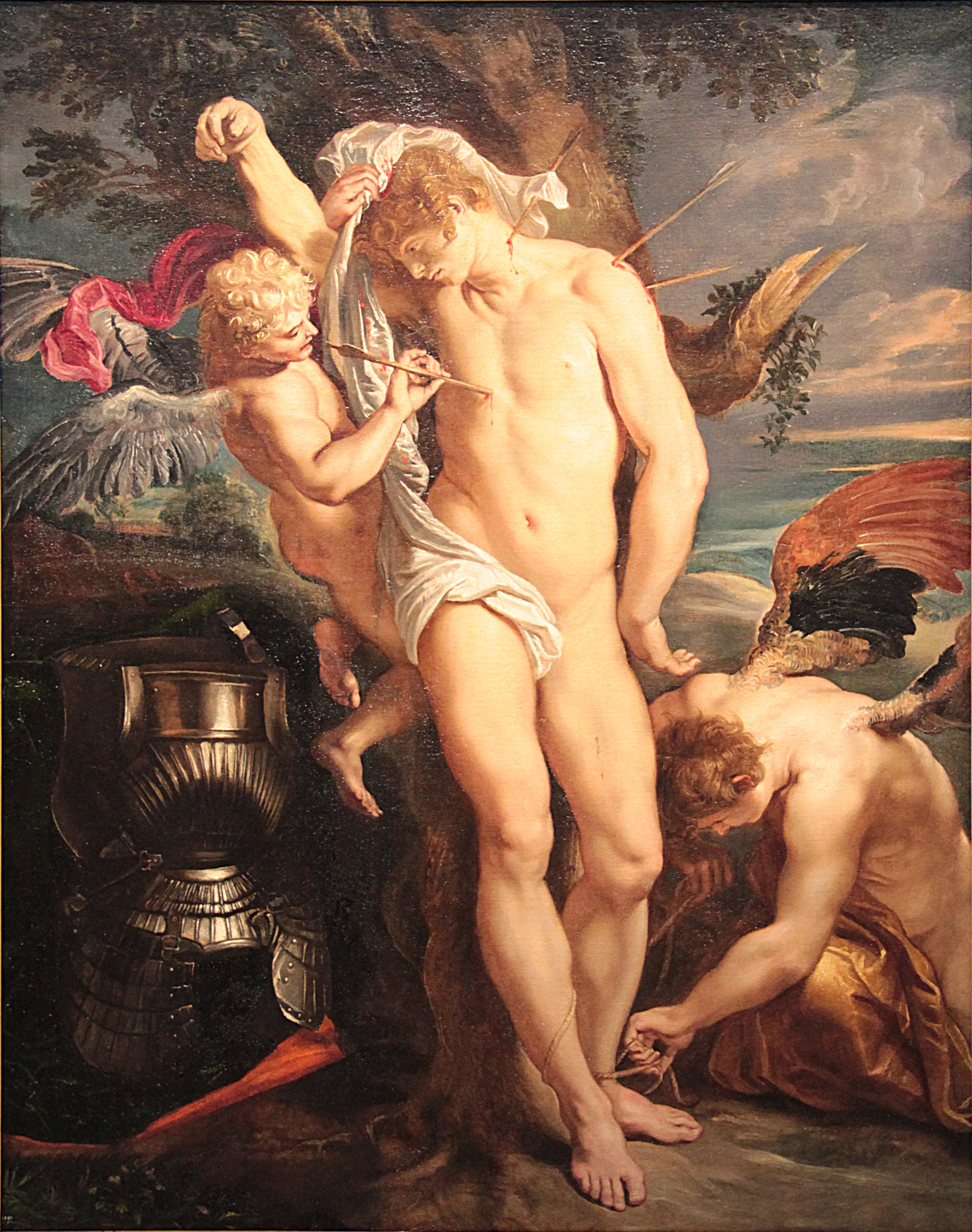
Saint Sebastian by Peter Paul Rubens (1604), oil on canvas, 120 × 100 cm, Antwerp

San Sebastian by Giacomo Raibolini (Giacomo Francia) (1520 - 1540), oil on panel

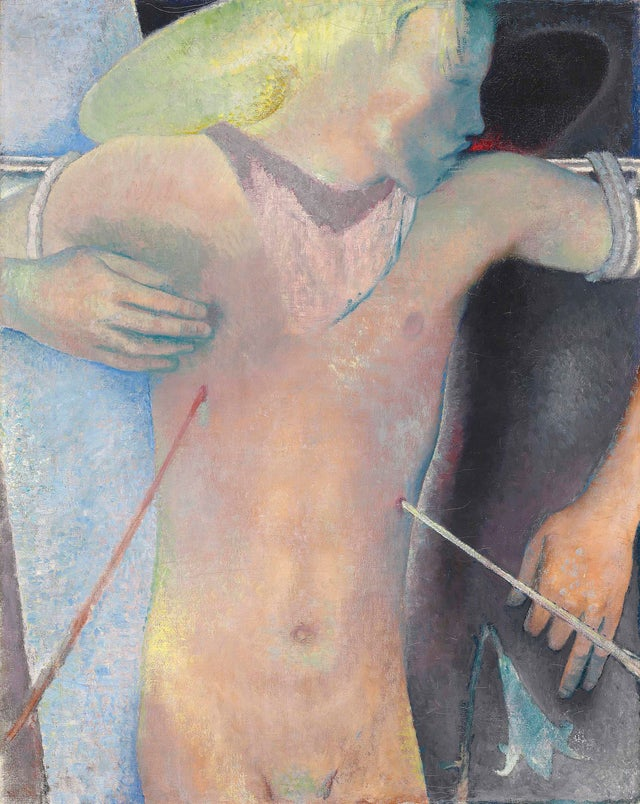
St Sebastian by Glyn Philpot (1932), oil on canvas, 36 × 28 1/2

In the Catholic Church, Sebastian is commemorated by an optional memorial on 20 January. In the Church of Greece, Sebastian's feast day is on 18 December.

As a protector from the bubonic plague, Sebastian was formerly one of the Fourteen Holy Helpers. In Catholicism, Sebastian is the patron saint of archers, pin-makers, athletes (a modern association) and of a holy death.

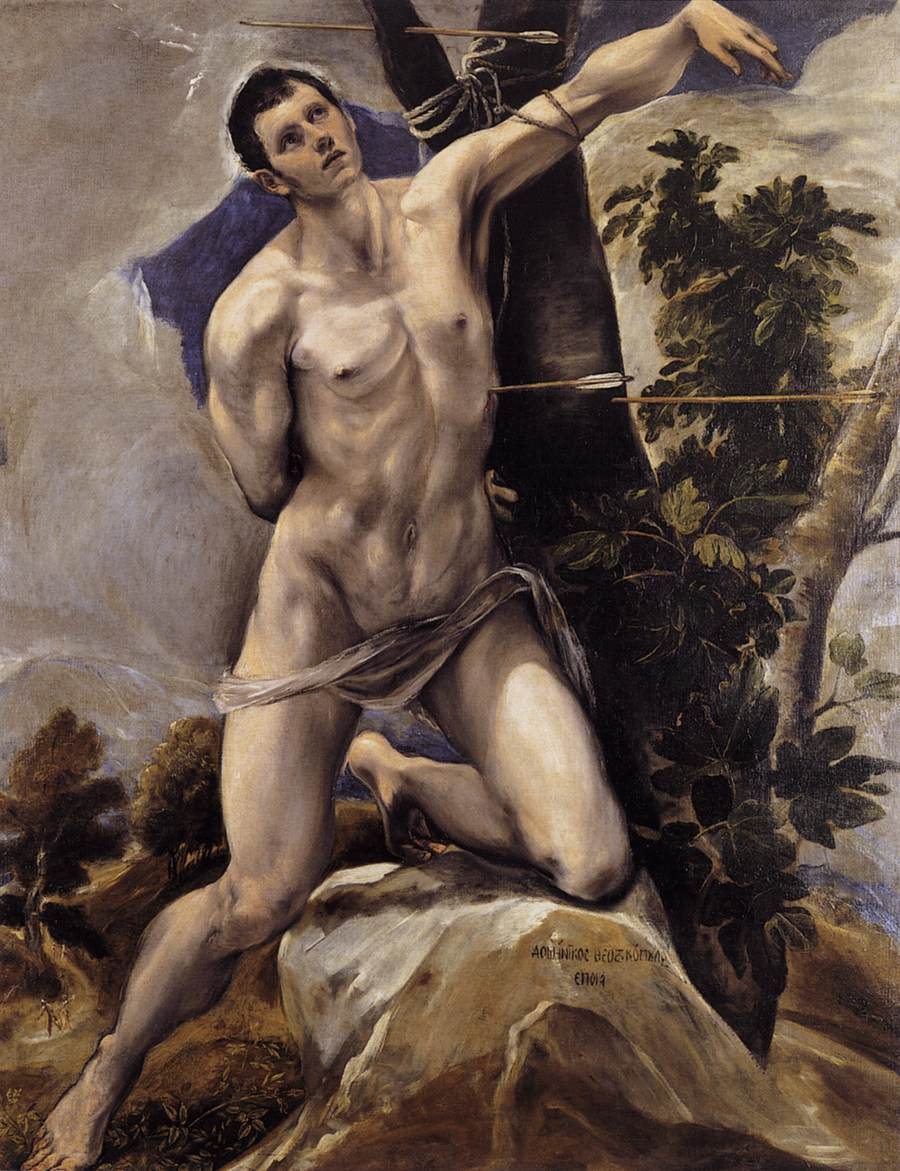
Saint Sebastian by El Greco (1578) in Cathedral of San Antolín, Palencia

Sebastian is one of the patron saints of the city of Qormi in Malta Sebastian is the patron saint of Acireale, Caserta and Petilia Policastro in Italy, Melilli in Sicily, and San Sebastián as well as Palma de Mallorca, Lubrín and Huelva in Spain. He is the patron saint of Negombo, Sri Lanka and Rio de Janeiro, Brazil. Informally, in the tradition of the Afro-Brazilian syncretic religion Umbanda, Sebastian is often associated with Oxossi, especially in the state of Rio de Janeiro itself. In Lubrín, every year on 20 January, there is a festival in honor of Saint Sebastian. A statue of Saint Sebastian leads a procession around the village, and people hurl bread rolls from their balconies to the crowds following the saint in the streets below. The rolls have a hole in the middle and some people string them on a rope around their body. The festival is thought to have originated in the 14th century, after a plague of cholera hit the area. At this time, the wealthy were said to have thrown bread and money to the poor on the streets below, so as to avoid catching the disease. The San Sebastian 'bread festival' is so unusual that it has been declared a Fiesta of National Tourist Interest in Andalusia.

King Sebastian I of Portugal, the only King to ever have this name, was so named for having been born on this saint's feast day.

The Feast of St. Sebastian is celebrated among Catholic communities of Kerala in India. Churches are illuminated and decorated, with fireworks being a main event in Catholic homes to commemorate the saint. Every parish has its own date of celebration, especially in the districts of Thrissur, Ernakulam, St. Andrew's Basilica, Arthunkal and Kottayam. In Kanjoor Syro Malabar Church the feast is celebrated with the largest procession of golden crosses and decorated umbrellas in Asia. Besides this, many pilgrim centres, churches, shrines and many educational institutions too, throughout Kerala, bear the name of the saint.

He is the patron of San Sebastian College – Recoletos in Manila, Philippines, which is adjacent to the Minor Basilica of San Sebastian, the all-steel church in the Philippines and in Asia administered by the Order of Augustinian Recollect (OAR). At the Catholic Newman Community at the University of Rochester, the St. Sebastian Society is an organization of campus-wide Christian athletes that works to serve the greater Rochester, New York, area through methods of restorative justice, special needs fundraising and community service.

Sebastian is the patron saint of the Diocese of Bacolod, in Negros Occidental, Philippines and Lipa City in Batangas, Philippines. Also, Sebastian is the patron saint of Leon City Mexico. A representation of the Saint in his martyrdom is present in the upper left corner of the city coat of arms.

Sebastian is the patron of Knights of Columbus Council #4926 in the Diocese of San Jose in California, serving the cities of Mountain View and Los Altos. Sebastian is the patron saint of the Catholic War Veterans of the United States of America. The highest award given by the CWV is the Honor Legion of the Order of St. Sebastian.

In his 1906 Reminiscences, Carl Schurz recalls the annual "bird shoot" pageant of the Rhenish town of Liblar (de), sponsored by the Saint Sebastian Society, a club of sharpshooters and their sponsors to which nearly every adult member of the town belonged.

The St. Sebastian River in the American state of Florida is named after him. The river is a tributary of the Indian River Lagoon and comprises part of the boundary between Indian River County and Brevard County. The adjacent city of Sebastian, Florida, and St. Sebastian River Preserve State Park are also named for Saint Sebastian.

== LGBTQ association ==
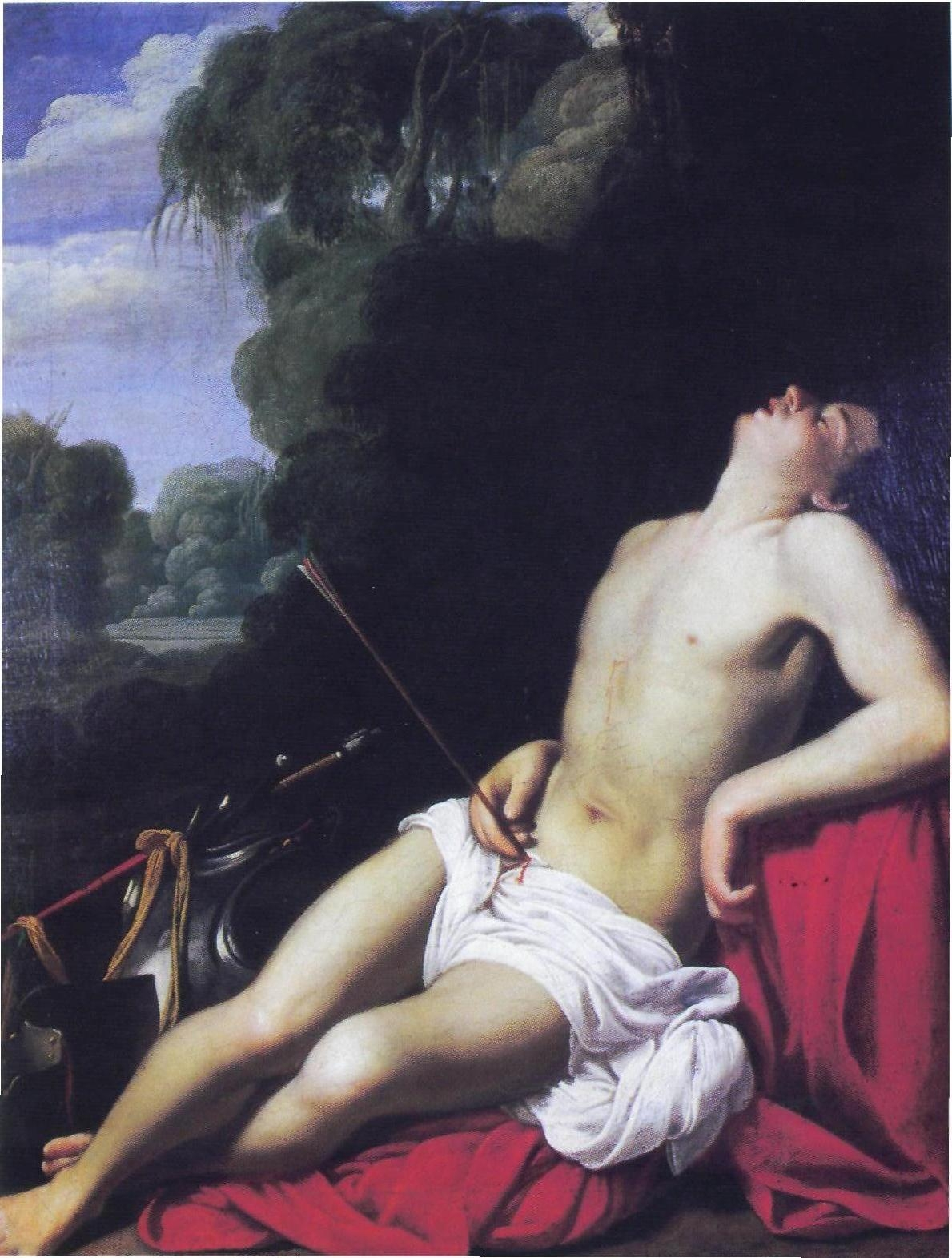
Saint Sebastian, Carlo Saraceni, c. 1610–1616, Picture Gallery of the Prague Castle. The image of Sebastian pierced by arrows has regularly been described as homoerotic.

Saint Sebastian is not recognized officially by the Roman Catholic Church as the patron saint of the LGBTQ community, but many people have associated him with that community because of how he is depicted in artwork.

In 1996, American author Richard A. Kaye wrote that "contemporary gay men have seen in Sebastian at once a stunning advertisement for homosexual desire (indeed, a homoerotic ideal), and a prototypical portrait of tortured closet case."

Some religious images depicting Saint Sebastian have been adopted by the LGBTQ community. A combination of his strong, shirtless physique, the symbolism of the arrows penetrating his body, and the countenance of rapturous pain have intrigued artists (gay or otherwise) for centuries.

Oscar Wilde was known to have adored Guido Reni's Saint Sebastian, which is in the collection of the Palazzo Rosso, in Genoa. While exiled in Paris, Wilde went so far as to adopt the alias Sebastian Melmoth during the remaining years of his life. Other homosexual poets and artists like Federico García Lorca or Pier Paolo Pasolini highlighted the importance of Saint Sebastian imagery in their work.

In Yukio Mishima's novel Confessions of a Mask, the protagonist Kochan has his first gay sexual experience while looking at a reproduction of Guido Reni's Saint Sebastian. Kochan remarks:

It is an interesting coincidence that Hirschfeld should place 'pictures of Saint Sebastian' in the first rank of those kinds of art works in which the invert takes special delight.

This references Magnus Hirschfeld's belief that gay men have an inclination towards certain artistic subjects including Saint Sebastian.

== See also ==
- Le martyre de Saint Sébastien, Claude Debussy
- Saint Sebastian at the Column
- Santa Muerte, from Mexican folk Catholicism, who is sometimes referred to as Santa Sebastiana
- The three paintings by Mantegna
- Saint Sebastian and the Angel

== Sources ==
- Barker, Sheila, The Making of a Plague Saint, ch. 4 in Piety and Plague: from Byzantium to the Baroque, Ed. Franco Mormando, Thomas Worcester Truman State University, 2007, ISBN 978-1-931112-73-4, Google books
- Boeckl, Christine M (2000). Images of Plague and Pestilence: Iconography and Iconology. Truman State University. pp. 76–80. ISBN 978-0-943549-85-9.
- Hedquist, Valerie, "Ter Brugghen's Saint Sebastian Tended by Irene," Journal of Historians of Netherlandish Art 9:2 (Summer 2017) doi:10.5092/jhna.2017.9.2.3, fully online
- Mitchell, Peter, "The Politics of Morbidity: Plague Symbolism in Martyrdom and Medical Anatomy", in The Arts of 17th-Century Science: Representations of the Natural World in European and North American Culture, eds. Claire Jowitt, Diane Watt, 2002, Routledge, ISBN 978-1351894449, google books
