= Mark S. Massa =

American Catholic priest and academic (1950–2026)

Mark S. Massa SJ (September 13, 1950 – November 15, 2026) was an American Catholic priest and academic who was a professor at Boston College.

== Life and career ==
Massa founded the Curran Center for American Catholic Studies at Fordham in 2001 and served as its director until 2010. He was also the first holder of the Karl Rahner Chair in Theology at Fordham University.

From 2010 to 2016 he was dean of the Boston College School of Theology and Ministry. Massa served as the director of the Boisi Center for Religion and American Public Life at Boston College.

He wrote a number of books including Anti-Catholicism in America: The Last Acceptable Prejudice? and Catholics and American Culture: Fulton Sheen, Dorothy Day, and the Notre Dame Football Team, which won the AJCU/Alpha Sigma Nu Award for Outstanding Work in Theology for 1999-2001.

Massa worked on a history of Catholic theology in the United States since the Second Vatican Council. He also served as the director of the U.S. Bishops' Committee for Ecumenical and Interreligious Affairs.

Massa died suddenly on November 15, 2026, at the age of 76.

== Education ==
- Th.D., Church History, Harvard University
- M.Div., Weston Jesuit School of Theology
- M.A., History Department, University of Chicago
- A.B., History and Theology, University of Detroit

== Publications ==
- Catholic Fundamentalism in America, Oxford University Press, June 2025.
- The Structure of Theological Revolutions: How the Fight Over Birth Control Transformed American Catholicism New York: Oxford University Press, 2018.
- The American Catholic Revolution: How the Sixties Changed the Church Forever New York: Oxford University Press, 2010.
- Anti-Catholicism: The Last Acceptable Prejudice? New York: Crossroad Press, 2003.
- Catholics and American Culture: Fulton Sheen, Dorothy Day, and the Notre Dame Football Team New York: Crossroad, 1999.
- Charles Augustus Briggs and the Crisis of Historical Criticism Minneapolis: Fortress Press, 1990.
- World Religions: A Sourcebook for Students of Christian Theology with Richard Viladesau Mahwah: Paulist Press, 1994.
