= Boisi Center for Religion and American Public Life =

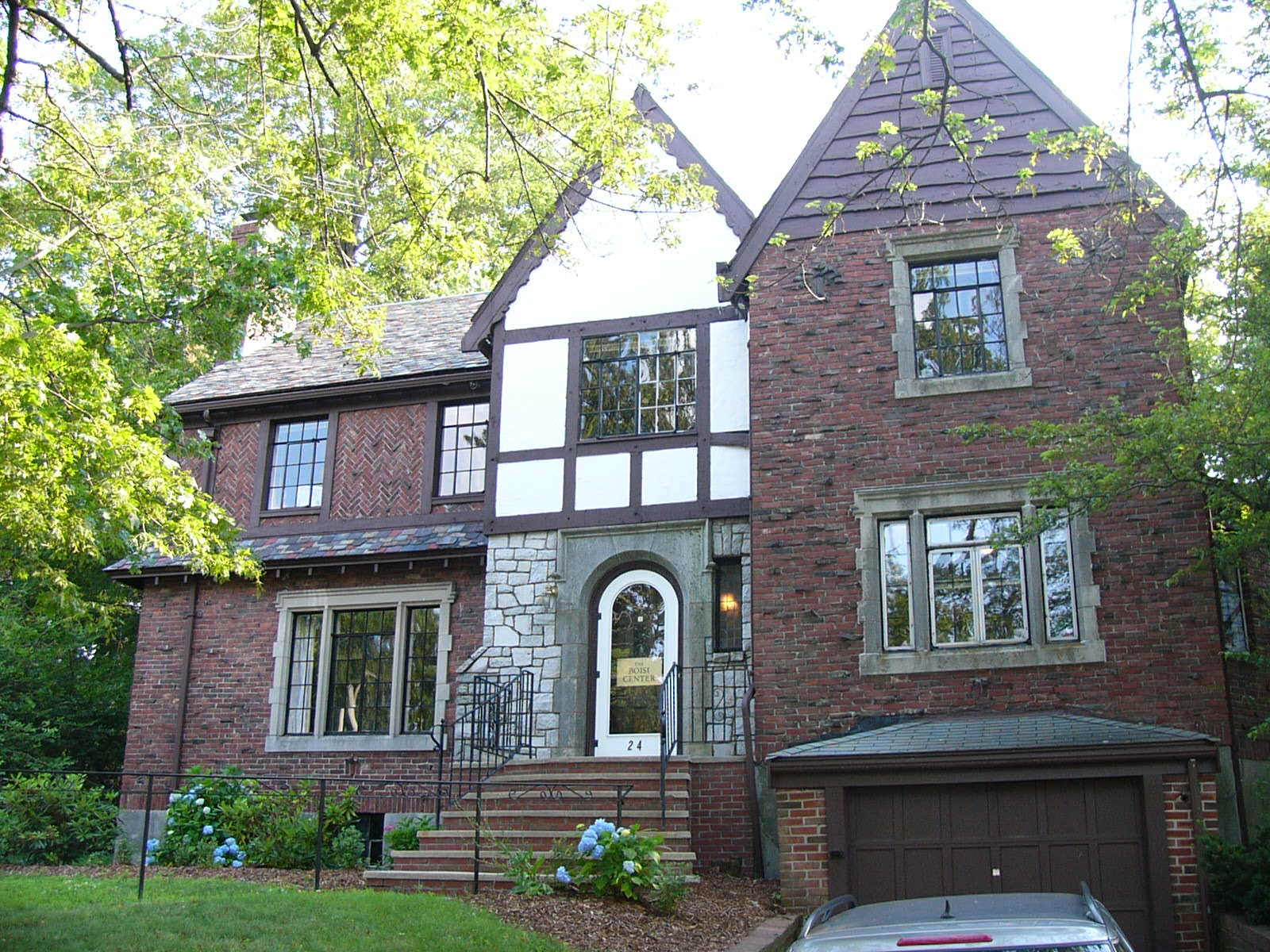
The Boisi Center at Boston College is located in this house on Quincy Road, adjacent to the BC campus.

The Boisi Center for Religion and American Public Life is a research center at Boston College. The goal of the Boisi Center is to create opportunities where a community of scholars, policy makers, media and religious leaders in the Boston area and nationally can connect in conversations and scholarly reflection around issues at the intersection of religion and American public life. The hope is that such conversations can help to clarify the moral and normative consequences of public policies in ways that can help us to maintain the common good, while respecting our growing religious diversity.

== Description ==
The Boisi Center does not seek to advance any ideological agenda, whether liberal or conservative. It does not see its role as advocating "for" religion as against something called "secularism." While based in a Jesuit university, it will not take sides in competing groups of Catholic theologians, nor will it defend a specifically Catholic viewpoint against non-Catholic ones. Its goal is to promote discussion and respect for conflicting positions.

The Boisi Center puts together conferences and seminars at Boston College, including one in October 2007 on Gambling and the American Moral Landscape. Visiting fellows are also associated with the Boisi Center, and the center strives to provide resources for media interested in religion and public life. Alan Wolfe was the founding director of the Boisi Center. Mark S. Massa succeeded him in 2016.

University trustee Geoffrey T. Boisi and Rene (Isacco) Boisi, both members of the college class of 1969, endowed the Center in 1999 with a $5 million gift.
