= Boston College School of Theology and Ministry =

Theology school of Boston College

Clough School
- Private Jesuit school of theology
- Boston College
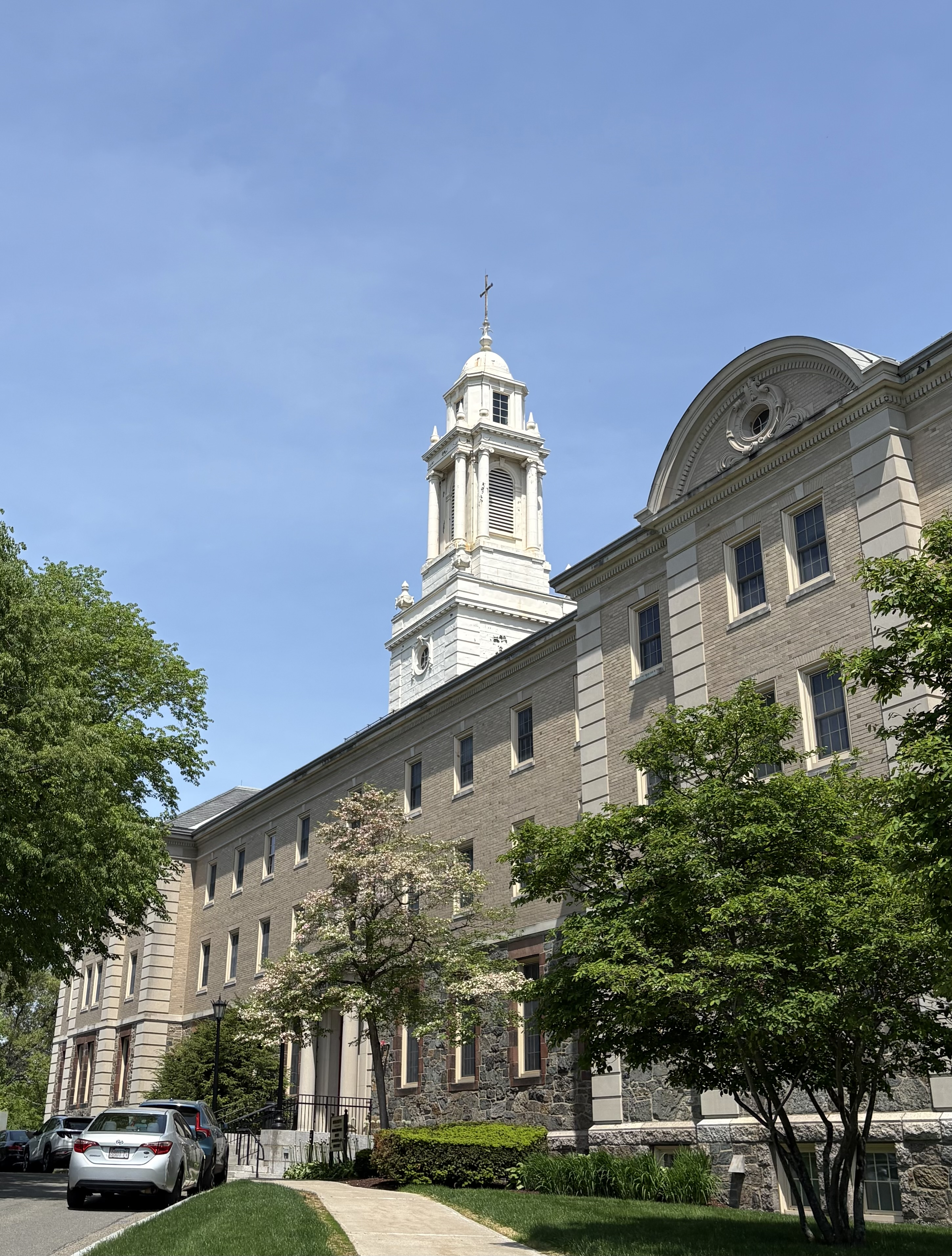
- Simboli Hall
- Location: Brighton, Boston, Massachusetts, U.S.
- Coordinates: 42°20′34″N 71°9′49″W
- Full name: Gloria L. and Charles I. Clough School of Theology and Ministry
- Abbreviation: CSTM
- Established: June 2008; 18 years ago
- Named for: Gloria and Charles Clough
- Colors: Maroon and gold
- Gender: Co-educational
- Dean: Michael C. McCarthy, S.J.
- Postgraduates: 380
- Website: bc.edu/stm

The Gloria L. and Charles I. Clough School of Theology and Ministry (CSTM), previously the Weston School of Theology, is a Jesuit school of graduate theology at Boston College. It is an ecclesiastical faculty of theology that trains men and women, both lay and religious, for scholarship and service, especially within the Catholic Church.

== History ==
The School of Theology and Ministry was founded in the merger of Weston Jesuit School of Theology in Cambridge, Massachusetts, and Boston College Institute for Religious Education and Pastoral Ministry on June 1, 2008.

Weston College opened in 1922 in the Boston suburb of Weston, Massachusetts, as a center of philosophy for the New England Province of the Jesuits which was also located in Weston, Massachusetts. Weston College expanded in 1927 to prepare men for ordination, and later to include religious and lay men and women, as the Weston Jesuit School of Theology.

Historically, the School of Theology at Weston College was listed in the Boston College course catalog as a constituent school of the university, with the names of theological degree graduates in the commencement program. Weston’s graduates received Boston College degrees from 1959 to 1974. Weston Jesuit School of Theology relocated to the environs of Harvard University in Cambridge, Massachusetts, in 1968.

In December 2004, Boston College announced plans to create a School of Theology and Ministry by merging the Institute for Religious Education and Pastoral Ministry and the Weston Jesuit School of Theology. The reaffiliation of Weston Jesuit School of Theology with Boston College took place in 2008, and the new school was moved to Boston College's campus in Brighton, purchased in 2006. These buildings formerly housed the chancery of the Archdiocese of Boston and portions of St. John's Seminary. In September 2015, Simboli Hall, home of the School of Theology and Ministry, was dedicated in recognition of alumnus and real estate developer Anthony C. Simboli and his wife Gloria.

In 2024, the School of Theology and Ministry was renamed for donors Charles “Chuck” Clough Jr. and Gloria Clough, who donated $25 million to the school.

== Academics ==
The School of Theology and Ministry is both a graduate divinity school and an ecclesiastical faculty of theology regulated by the Apostolic Constitution Sapientia Christiana (1979) and accredited by the Association of Theological Schools in the United States and Canada. It offers both master and doctoral degrees, civil and ecclesiastical degrees, and a wide variety of continuing education offerings, including online programs through C21 Online.

- Master of Divinity (M.Div.)
- Master of Arts in Theology and Ministry (M.A.)
- Master of Theological Studies (M.T.S.)
- Master of Theology (Th.M.)
- Doctor of Philosophy in Theology and Education (Ph.D.)
- Bachelor's of Sacred Theology (S.T.B.)
- Licentiate in Sacred Theology (S.T.L.)
- Doctorate in Sacred Theology (S.T.D.)

=== Faculty ===
There are approximately 29 full-time faculty members at the School of Theology and Ministry, in addition to about 32 members of the Morrissey College Department of Theology at Boston College with which students are able to work and take classes. The School of Theology and Ministry faculty can be divided according to their research in the following fields:

- Historical Theology
- Systematic Theology
- Practical Theology
- Church History
- Moral Theology
- Biblical Studies
- Religious Education
- Pastoral Counseling
- Canon Law
- Liturgical Theology

== Student demographics ==
Enrollment at the School of Theology and Ministry is approximately 420 students. While the majority of students at the STM are Catholic, it is also home to a number of Anglican/Episcopal, Methodist, Lutheran, Evangelical, Orthodox, Presbyterian, Unitarian Universalist, Nondenominational, Buddhist, and Hindu students. The student body includes representatives from 27 nations and 6 continents, and students range in age from 21 to 74 years old. Laypersons comprise 65% of the students at the STM while 35% represent a religious order or are diocesan priests. Lay students in all programs study alongside Jesuit scholars.

== Theology and Ministry Library ==
The Theology and Ministry Library is located on the Brighton Campus. It is open to all Boston College students, faculty and staff, and is a part of the Boston College Library System. Integrating the former collections of Weston Jesuit School of Theology and St. John's Seminary, it contains more than 2.44 million volumes. The library also participates in the Boston Theological Institute library program, which allows School of Theology and Ministry students to borrow materials from any of the other BTI libraries.

== New Testament Abstracts ==
The School of Theology and Ministry publishes New Testament Abstracts, a research and bibliographic aid for scholars, librarians, clergy, and students of the New Testament and its historical milieu. The journal has been in publication since 1956, and each year it abstracts approximately 1,500 articles, selected from over 500 periodicals in different languages, as well as hundreds of books. New Testament Abstracts is published three times per year.

== Deans ==
1. Rev. Richard J. Clifford, S.J. (2008–2010)
2. Rev. Mark S. Massa, S.J. (2010–2016)
3. Rev. Thomas D. Stegman, S.J. (2016–2022)
4. Rev. Michael C. McCarthy, S.J. (2022–present)

== Notable alumni ==
- Leo J. O'Donovan, president of Georgetown University
- Jeffrey Paul von Arx, president of Fairfield University
- Kevin Wildes, president of Loyola University New Orleans
- J. Donald Freeze, provost at Georgetown University
- David O'Leary, former university chaplain at Tufts University
- Robert Araujo, John Courtney Murray Professor at Loyola University Chicago School of Law
- Katarina Schuth, Endowed Professor for the Social Scientific Study of Religion at the Saint Paul Seminary School of Divinity at the University of St. Thomas
- Joseph Koterski, Associate Professor of Philosophy, Fordham University
- Michael Holman, Provincial of the British Province of the Society of Jesus
- Richard Joseph Malone, Bishop of Portland from 2004 to 2012 and then Bishop of Buffalo
- James Martin, Jesuit priest, writer and editor-at-large for the Jesuit magazine America
- T. J. Martinez, founding president of Cristo Rey Jesuit College Preparatory of Houston
- Greg Boyle, Founding Director of Homeboy Industries
- Thomas Worcester, president of Regis College, Toronto
- Daniel J. Harrington, Jesuit priest and noted New Testament scholar
- Thanh Thai Nguyen, Auxiliary Bishop of the Diocese of Orange

== See also ==
- Boston College
- Pontifical university
- Jesuit School of Theology of Santa Clara University
- List of Jesuit sites
