= J. Donald Freeze =

Academic Vice President

James Donald Freeze, S.J. (September 15, 1932 – December 10, 2006) was the Academic Vice President (or Provost) for the main campus of Georgetown University from 1979 to 1991. In this role, he supervised all academic programs of Georgetown's College of Arts and Sciences, School of Foreign Service, School of Language and Linguistics, School of Business Administration, Graduate School, and School for Summer and Continuing Education.

Born in Baltimore, Maryland he became a Jesuit novice in 1950. After junior college at the Jesuit seminary in Wernersville, Pennsylvania, he received a master's degree in philosophy from Weston College (now the Weston Jesuit School of Theology ) in Massachusetts in 1957.

He taught Latin and French at Saint Joseph's Preparatory School in Philadelphia for three years, then studied theology at the University of Innsbruck in Austria from 1960 to 1964. He spent another year in France and took his final vows as a Jesuit and was ordained a priest at Wheeling Jesuit College in West Virginia in 1968.

Father Freeze taught metaphysics and psychology at Wheeling College until 1969, then became chairman of its philosophy department while doing graduate work in philosophy at Duquesne University in Pittsburgh, Pennsylvania. He lived at Georgetown University from 1970 until 1991.

Starting in 1971, he served as assistant dean for Georgetown College. He was named Assistant Vice President for Academic Affairs in 1974, and appointed Provost in 1979 by President Timothy S. Healy, S.J.

As Provost, he led creation of Georgetown's study abroad program near Florence, Italy, situated in Villa La Balze, a gift of Margaret Rockefeller Strong de Larraín, Marquesa de Cuevas. After Father Freeze's resignation as Provost in 1991, he served as the academic director of Georgetown's Florence programs for the 1991-1992 academic year.

After his retirement from academic posts, he held a number of positions within the Society of Jesus including service as the director of the Loyola Retreat House, Faulkner, Maryland, Treasurer of the Maryland Province of the Society of Jesus, and superior of the Colombiere Jesuit Community in Baltimore, Maryland.

He died at age 74 of Alzheimer's disease, 10 December 2006, Manresa Hall Infirmary in Merion, Pennsylvania.

In June 2021, Freeze was accused of nonconsensual contact with a student of Georgetown University during his time as provost. Georgetown President John DeGioia announced that Freeze would be stripped of all honorary degrees and special recognition, and apologized to the community.
