= David O'Leary (priest) =

Father David O'Leary
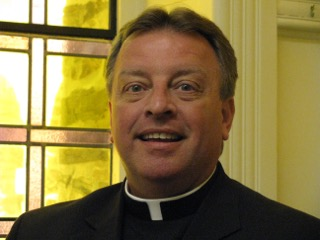
- Education: D.Phil., S.T.L., M.Div., M.Ed.
- Occupation: Pastor

David O'Leary is a priest and educator, appointed as a Canon in the Equestrian Order of the Holy Sepulcher of Jerusalem. He is currently serving as the Pastor at Holy Family Parish in Concord and St. Irene Parish in Carlisle, Massachusetts (The Concord-Carlisle Collaborative). Previously, he was pastor at Good Shepherd Parish in Wayland, MA, and before that, he was Parochial Vicar at Immaculate Conception Parish in Malden, MA. and was also formerly the University Chaplain for Tufts University in Medford, Massachusetts. During his time at Tufts University he was also Senior Lecturer in Religion and Medical Ethics and Chair of the Social, Behavioral and Educational Institutional Review Board.

== Early years ==
Born and raised in Massachusetts, he received both his M.Div. from Saint John's Seminary in Boston. He then went on S.T.L. degree (Licentiate in Sacred Theology) from Weston Jesuit School of Theology.

== Career ==
O’Leary has previously lectured at Saint Mary's Seminary and University in Baltimore, Maryland as an assistant Professor of Moral Theology. He served as Chaplain for the U.S. Air Force Reserve where he was awarded the Air Force Commendation Medal, Air Force Reserve Medal, National Defense Medal and earned the rank of Major. At Tufts University he has taught courses including “World Religions and International Relations”, “Catholicism”, “Catholic Moral & Social Teachings”, “World Religions and Sexual Ethics”, “World Religions and Economic Justice”, “Introduction to Religions”, “Mystics and Mysticism in World Religions”, and “Medical and Research Ethics”.

In 2010, O'Leary co-founded The Giving Camp, a non-profit day retreat in Merrimack Valley for people with physical and mental challenges, and continues to serve as a board member of the retreat.

He was Director of both Goddard Chapel and the Interfaith Center at Tufts University from 2002 until 2012. He worked in spiritual direction, retreats, pastoral counseling, engaged and marriage counseling and a range of other duties as University Chaplain. He managed an interfaith chaplaincy team of five chaplains and many student religious organizations. He served as Chair of the Social, Behavioral and Educational Institutional Review Board at Tufts University's Medford campus and a member of the Institutional Review Board at Tufts Medical Center. He also serves as ethicist for many hospitals and nursing care facilities, as an IRB certified professional regarding public responsibility in medicine and research.

O’Leary has been featured in many shows for broadcast on The CatholicTV Network regarding topics such as “Catholic Citizenship”, “Praying with the Scripture”, and “Understanding the Bible”. He has been interviewed on National Public Radio and featured in multiple articles in the Boston Globe, as well as the Tufts Daily. He has additionally written articles for the Boston Globe including “When Adults Become Abusers of Young People” and has published many books.

In June 2015, O'Leary was appointed as Parochial Vicar of Immaculate Conception Parish in Malden, MA after spending time as the Administrator of Incarnation Parish in Melrose, MA as well as at St. Anne Paris in Readville, MA.

He has been elected to membership in the American Academy of Religion, Catholic Theological Society of America, Council on Faith & International Affairs, North American Interfaith Network and the Society of Christian Ethics. He has also been appointed a Canon in the Equestrian Order of the Holy Sepulchre of Jerusalem, which is the highest Papal award conferred on clergy and laity for service to the Church in teaching and supporting the Faith.

O’Leary celebrated the 25th anniversary of his ordination to the priesthood in 2010 as a member of the Archdiocese of Boston.

== Published works ==
- Encyclopedia of Religions and Spiritual Development, 12 articles (2006)
- A Study of Josef Fuchs’ Writing on Human Nature and Morality (2005)
- Roman Catholic Beliefs and Prayers, A Handbook for those on a Spiritual Journey (2001)
- Seeking the Path of God’s Justice, An Analysis of the U.S. Bishops’ Pastoral Letter on Economic Justice (2001)
- The Roman Catholic Perspective on the Morality of Withdrawing or Withholding Food and Fluid Administered Artificially to an Individual in the Persistent Vegetative State (1999)
- A Vision of Catechesis for Today and Pointers on Catechetical Instruction (1996)
