= Thomas Worcester =

American Jesuit, academic and university administrator

11th President of Regis College, Toronto
- In office 2017 – June 30, 2022
- Preceded by: Joseph Schner

Personal details
- Born: Burlington, Vermont, U.S.
- Education: Columbia University (BA); Harvard University (MTS); Facultés Loyola Paris (licencié); Weston School of Theology (STL); University of Cambridge (PhD)

Thomas Worcester SJ is an American historian. He was a professor of history at the College of the Holy Cross from 1994 to 2018 and the 11th president of Regis College, Toronto, from 2017 to 2022.

== Biography ==
Worcester was born and raised in Burlington, Vermont. He graduated from Columbia University with a B.A., magna cum laude, in French and philology in 1977. He then earned an M.T.S. in historical theology from Harvard Divinity School in 1980, a licencié in philosophy with high honors from the Facultés Loyola Paris in 1987, an S.T.L. with distinction in church history from the Weston School of Theology in 1990, and his Ph.D. in French history from the University of Cambridge in 1994 under Peter Burke. He had entered the Society of Jesus in 1983 and was ordained to the priesthood in 1991.

After receiving his doctorate, Worcester was a professor of history at the College of the Holy Cross from 1994 to 2018. He was appointed the president of Regis College, a postgraduate theological college of the University of Toronto, in 2017. He was also appointed professor of history at the University of Toronto in 2018. Under his leadership, Regis College announced the merging of graduate facilities with the University of St. Michael's College, while retaining its separate board of governors and administration.

Worcester's research focuses on the history of the Catholic Church in early modernity, especially the religion and culture of early modern France and Italy. He became a professor of history at Fordham University in January 2023.
