= Arnobius the Younger =

Bishop of Gaul

Arnobius the Younger (Latin: Arnobius Junior) was a Christian priest or bishop in Gaul, who wrote from Rome around the year 460.

He is the author of a mystical and allegorical commentary on the Psalms, first published by Erasmus in 1522, and by him attributed to the elder Arnobius.

It has been frequently reprinted, and in the edition of De la Barre, 1580, is accompanied by some notes on the Gospels by the same author. More recently, CCSL 25 has produced a critical edition of his commentary.

To him has sometimes been ascribed the anonymous treatise, Arnobii catholici et Serapionis conflictus de Deo trino et uno ... de gratiae liberi arbitrii concordia, which was probably written by a follower of Augustine. The opinions expressed in his commentary have been called semi-Pelagian, probably due to his opposition to Augustine's doctrine of predestination. Rondeau infers an African origin for Arnobius due, in part, to his dependence on Ticonius.

Cécile Lanéry has attributed to Arnobius the Younger the anonymous Passio sanctae Caeciliae. Michael Lapidge accepts Lanéry's arguments in favor of the attribution as "powerful and incontrovertible."

== See also ==
- Arnobius the Elder
