= St. Sebastian River Preserve State Park =

State park in Florida, United States

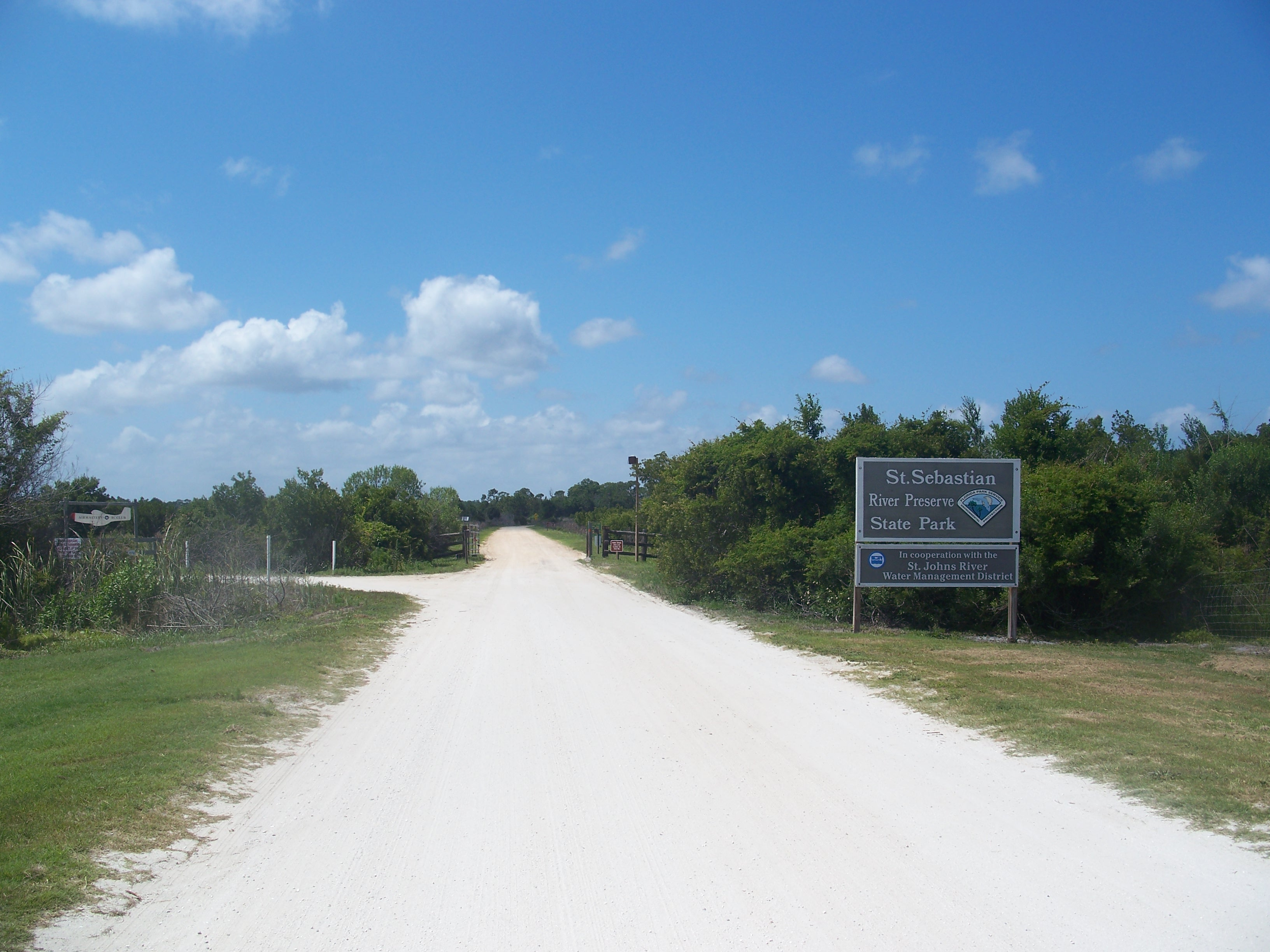
- Welcome sign

- Location within Florida Location within the United States
- Interactive map of St. Sebastian River Preserve State Park
- Location: Brevard and Indian River counties, USA
- Nearest city: Fellsmere, Florida
- Coordinates: 27°49′39″N 80°33′37″W
- Governing body: Florida Department of Environmental Protection

St. Sebastian River Preserve State Park is a Florida State Park, located three miles north of Fellsmere. It is located in both Indian River County and Brevard County, and is designed around protecting the natural surroundings of the Saint Sebastian River. The park is also co-managed by the St. Johns River Water Management District.

== See also ==
- St. Sebastian River
- Hernández–Capron Trail
