= Queen Anne style furniture =

Furniture design developed before, during, and after the time of Queen Anne

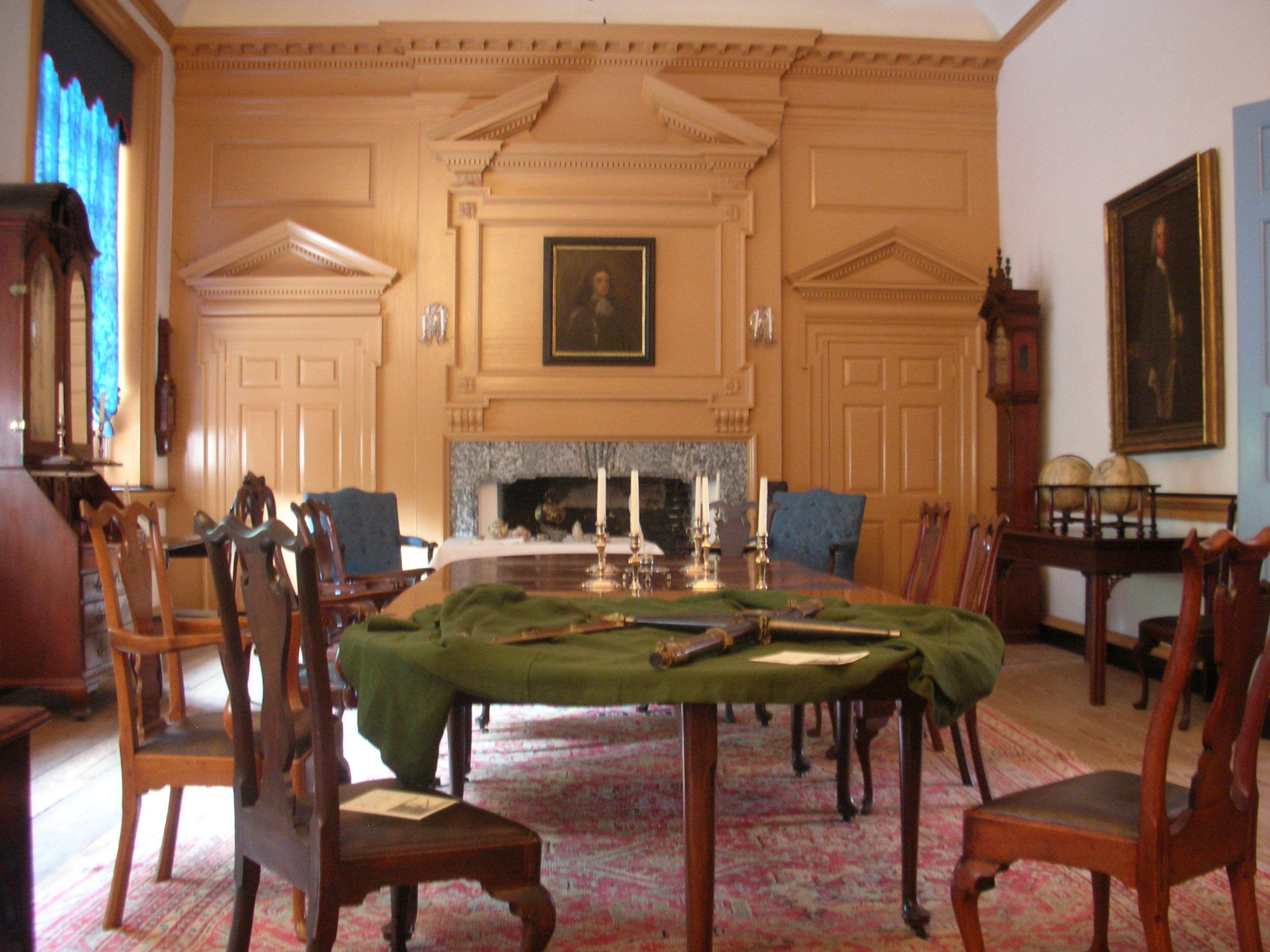
Queen Anne furniture in the Governor's Council Chamber of Independence Hall, Philadelphia, Pennsylvania. The chairs are attributed to William Savery.

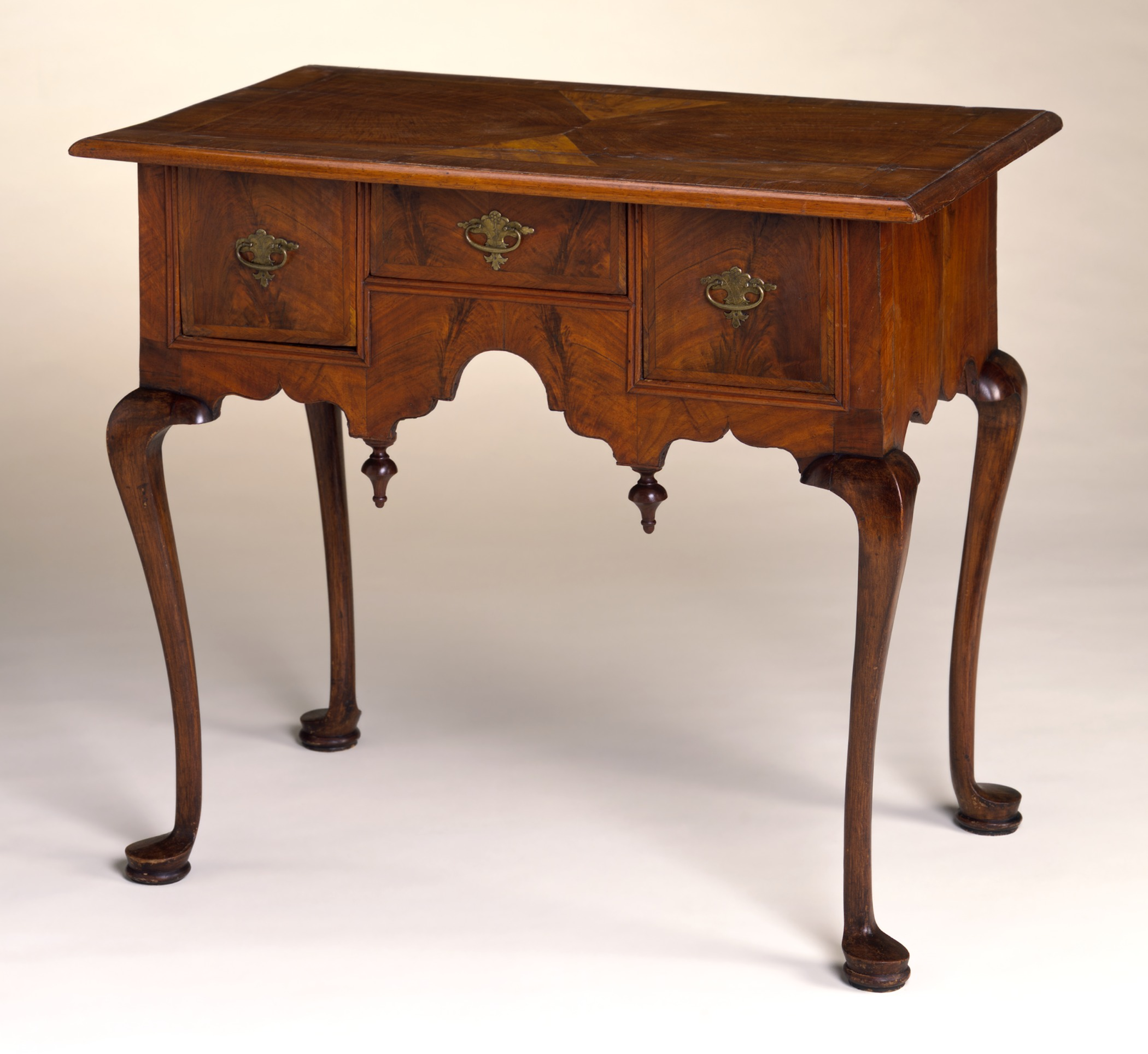
Queen Anne dressing table with cabriole legs. Boston, Massachusetts, circa 1730-1750

The Queen Anne style of furniture design developed before, during, and after the time of Queen Anne, who reigned from 1702 to 1714.

== History and characteristics ==
Queen Anne furniture is "somewhat smaller, lighter, and more comfortable than its predecessors," and examples in common use include "curving shapes, the cabriole leg, cushioned seats, wing-back chairs, and practical secretary desk-bookcase pieces." Other elements characterizing the style include pad feet and "an emphasis on line and form rather than ornament." The style of Queen Anne's reign is sometimes described as late Baroque rather than "Queen Anne."

The Queen Anne style began to evolve during the reign of William III of England (1689-1702), but the term predominantly describes decorative styles from the mid-1720s to around 1760, although Queen Anne reigned earlier (1702-1714). "The name 'Queen Anne' was first applied to the style more than a century after it was fashionable." The use of Queen Anne styles in America, beginning in the 1720s and 1730s, coincided with new colonial prosperity and increased immigration of skilled British craftsmen to the colonies. Some elements of the Queen Anne style remain popular in modern furniture production.

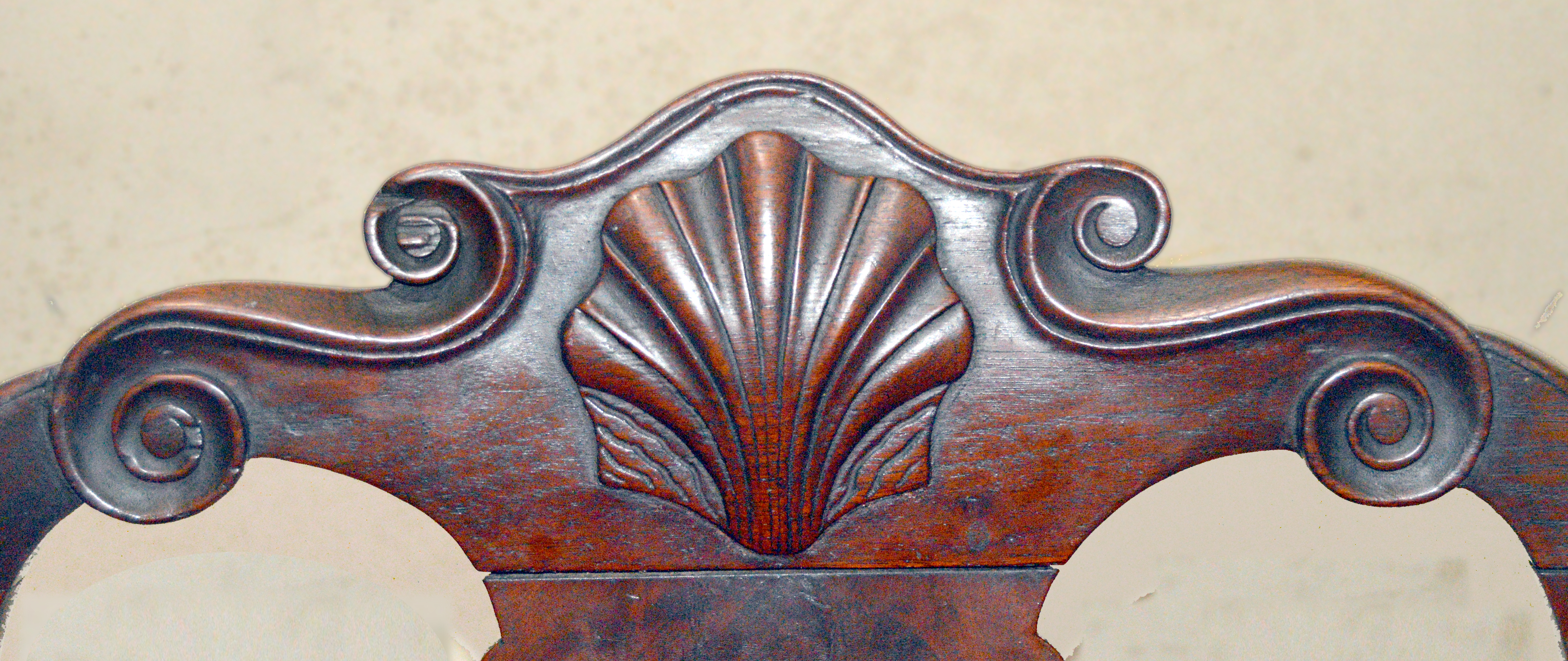
Carved shell and S-scroll features on a walnut Philadelphia Queen Anne compass-seat chair, c1750 (Private collection)

Curved lines, in feet, legs, arms, crest rails, and pediments, along with restrained ornament (often in a shell shape) emphasizing the material, are characteristic of Queen Anne style. In contrast to William and Mary furniture, which was marked by rectilinearity (straight lines) and use of curves for decoration, Queen Anne furniture uses C-scroll, S-scrolls, and ogee (S-curve) shapes in the structure of the furniture itself. In sophisticated urban environments, walnut was a frequent choice for furniture in the Queen Anne style, superseding the previously dominant oak and leading to the era being called "the age of walnut." However, poplar, cherry, and maple were also used in Queen Anne style furniture.

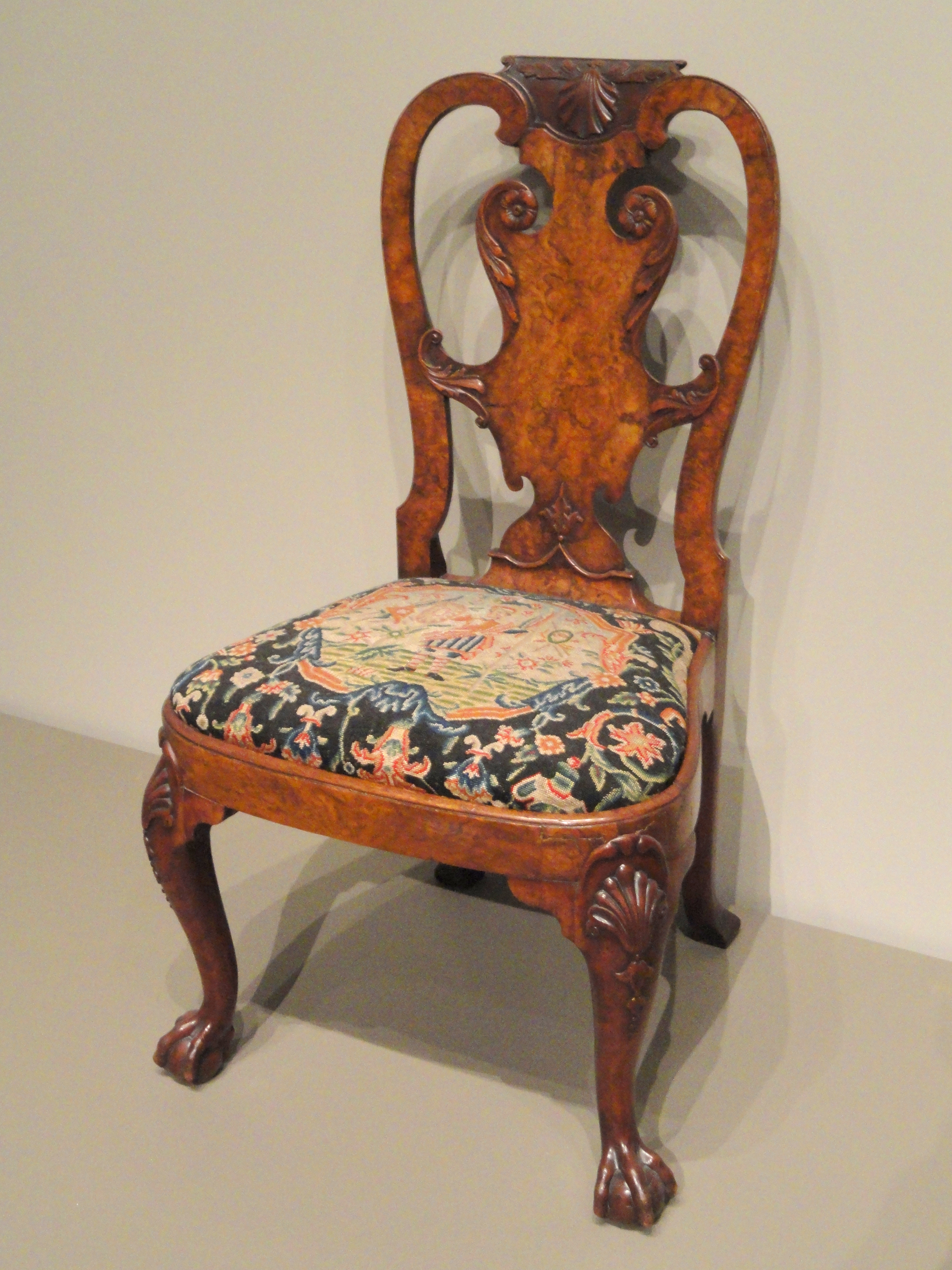
Walnut and burr walnut veneer side chair attributed to Giles Grendey, London, c. 1740 (Art Institute of Chicago)

Ornamentation is minimal, in contrast to earlier 17th-century and William and Mary styles, which prominently featured inlay, figured veneers, paint, and carving. The cabriole leg is the "most recognizable element" of Queen Anne furniture. Cabriole legs were influenced by the designs of the French cabinetmaker André-Charles Boulle and the Rococo style from the French court of Louis XV. But the intricate ornamentation of post-Restoration furniture was abandoned in favor of more conservative designs, possibly under the influence of the simple and elegant lines of imported Chinese furniture.

When decorative motifs or other ornamentation are used in Queen Anne-style furniture, it is often limited to carved scallop or shell or scroll-shaped motifs (sometimes in relief form and often found on the crest and knees), broken and C-curves, and acanthus leaves. The use of japanning is an exception to the general Queen Anne trend of minimal ornament. When used, japanned decoration was frequently in red, green, or gilt on a blue-green field.

The tilt-top tea table on a tripod was first made during the "Queen Anne" (in reality George II) period in the 1730s.

Queen Anne eventually was eclipsed by the later Chippendale style; late Queen Anne and early Chippendale pieces are very similar, and the two styles are often identified with each other.

== Gallery ==
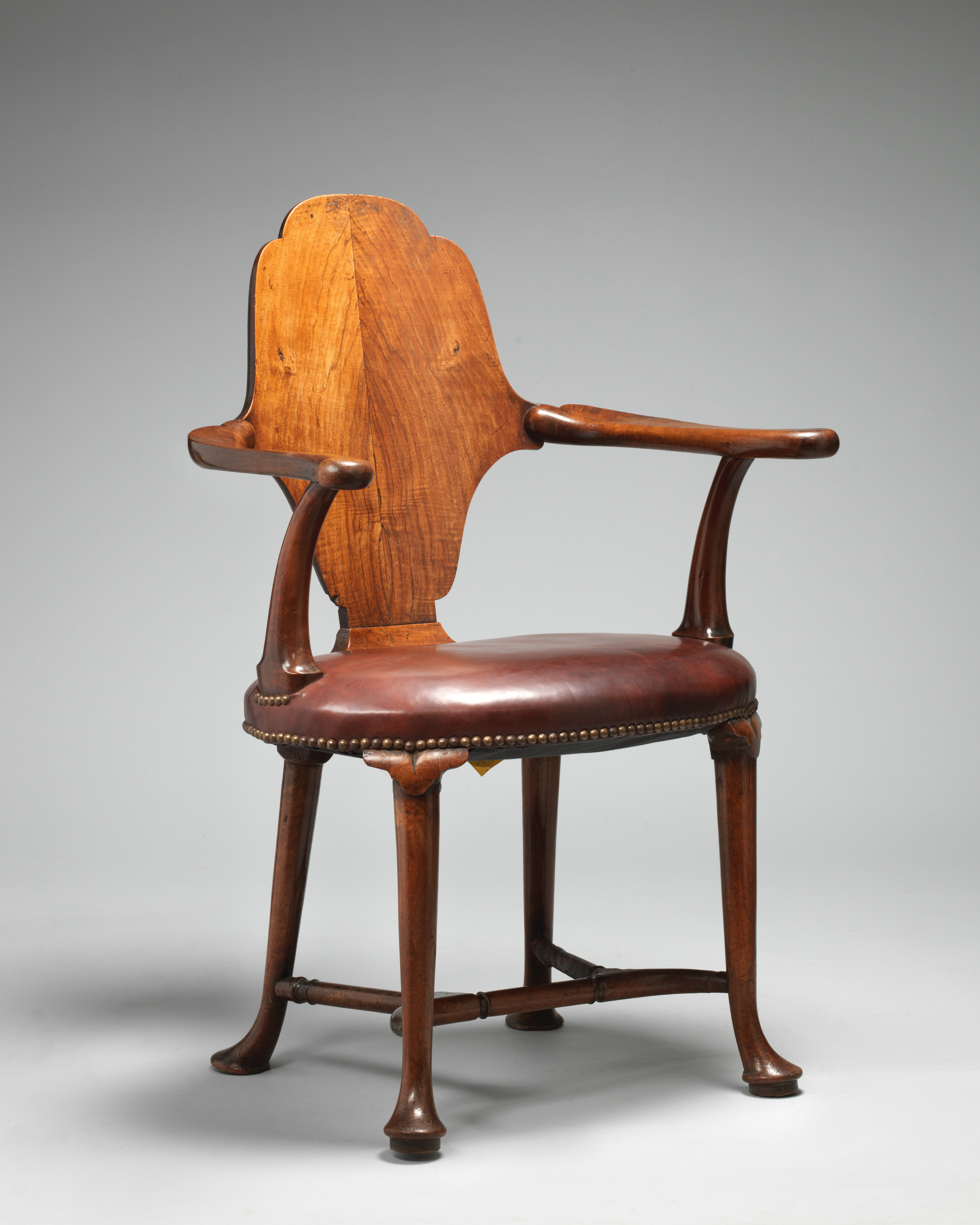
Armchair, British, circa 1710

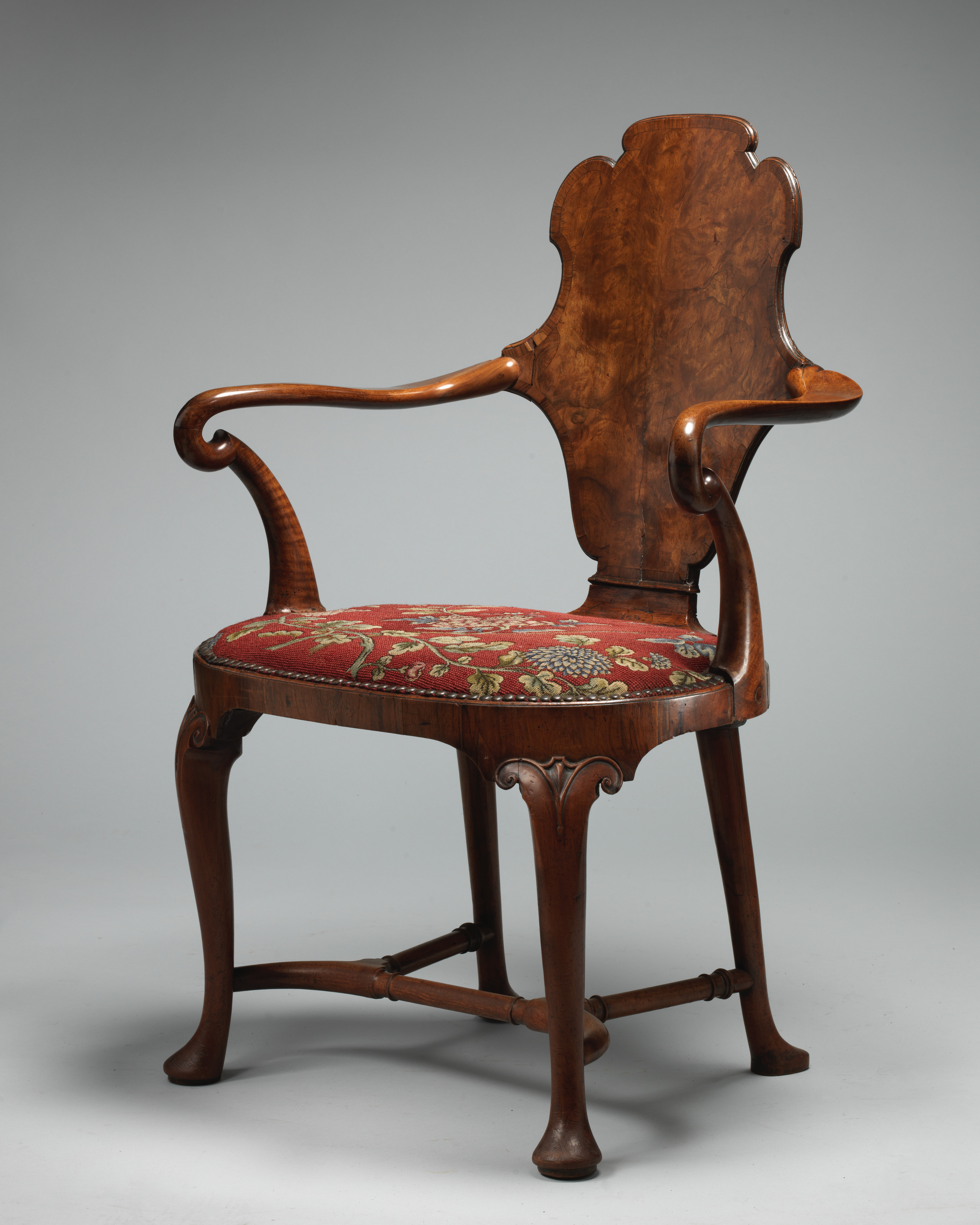
Armchair, British, circa 1710

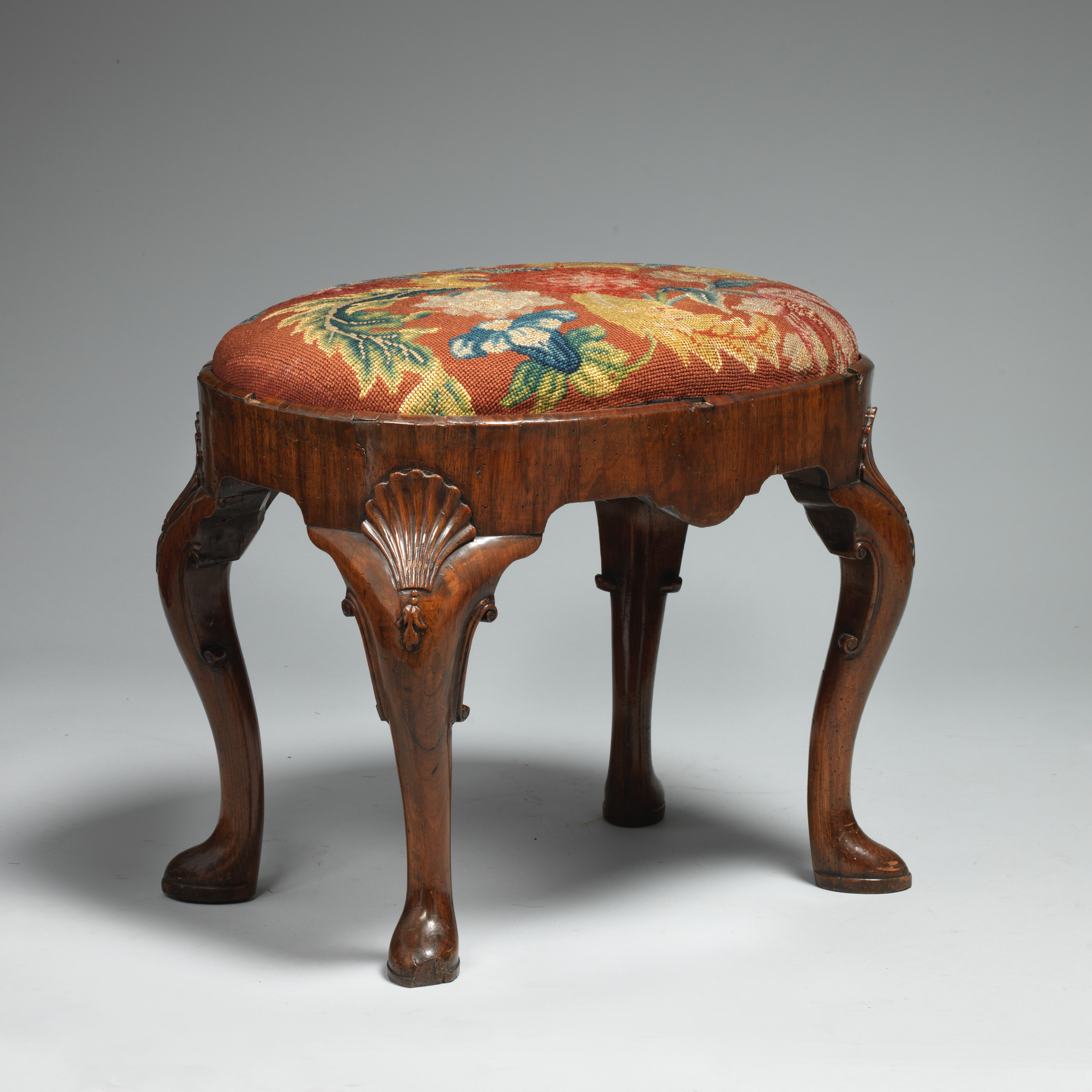
Stool, British, circa 1710

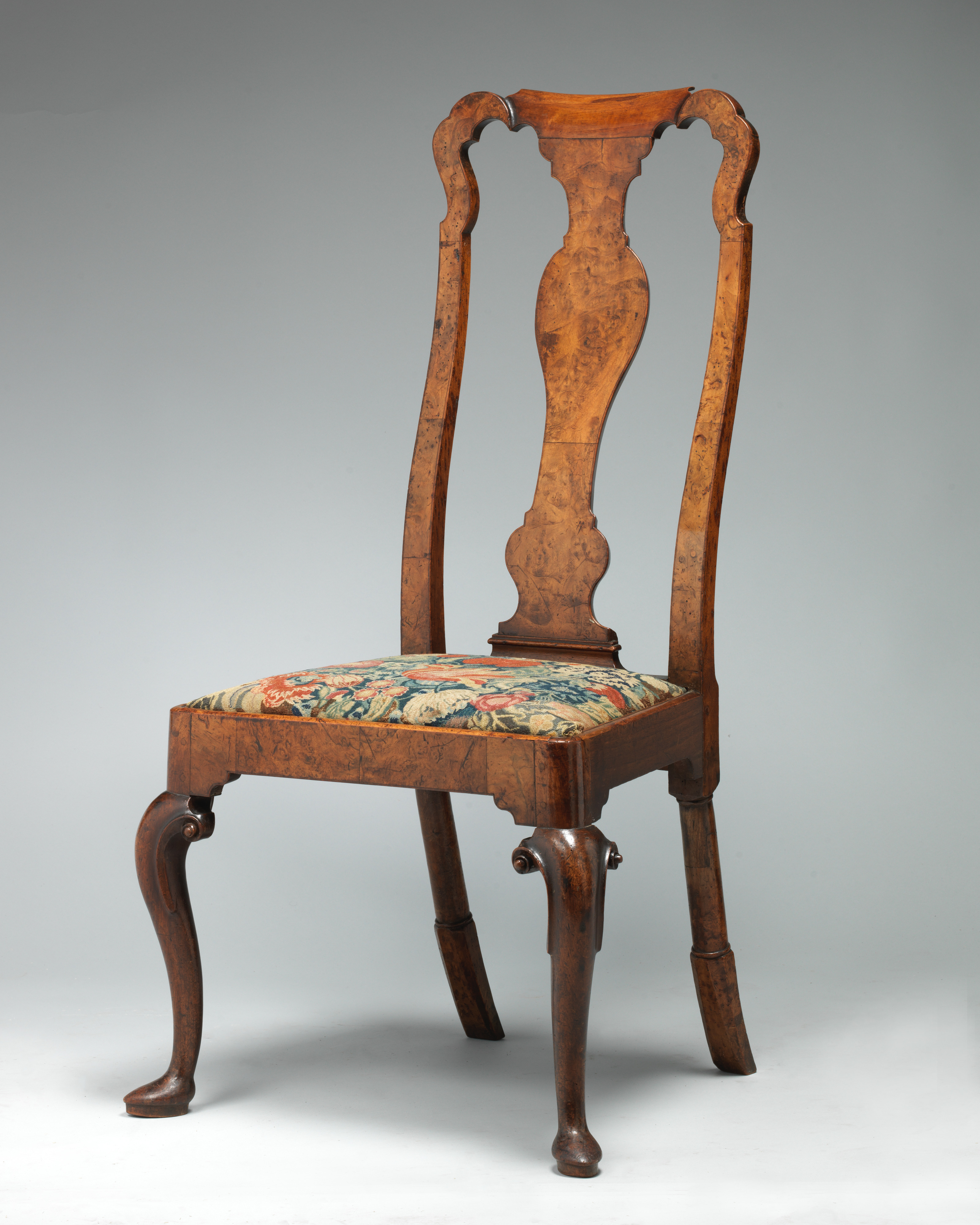
Side chair, British, circa 1710–20

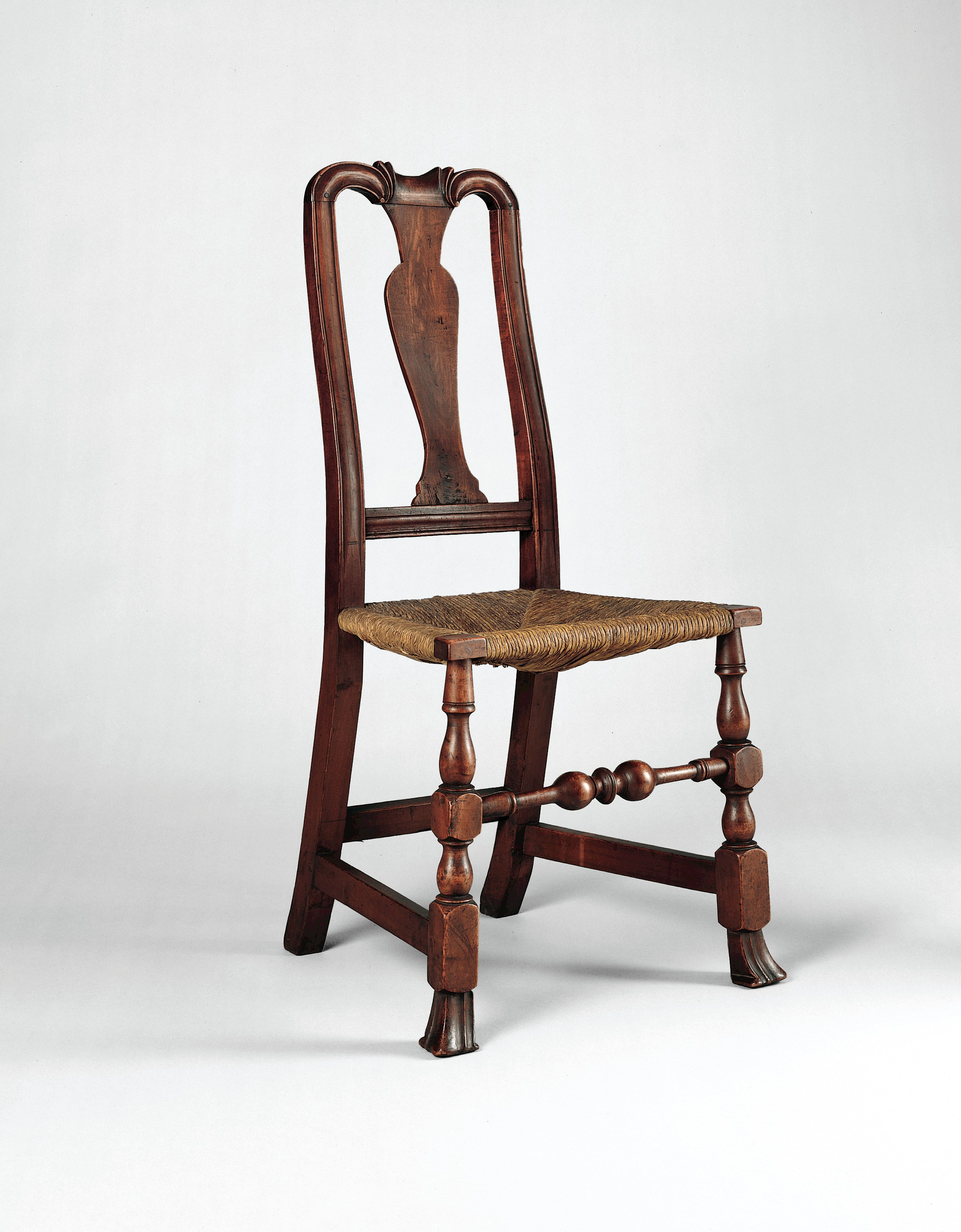
Side Chair, American, 1710–20

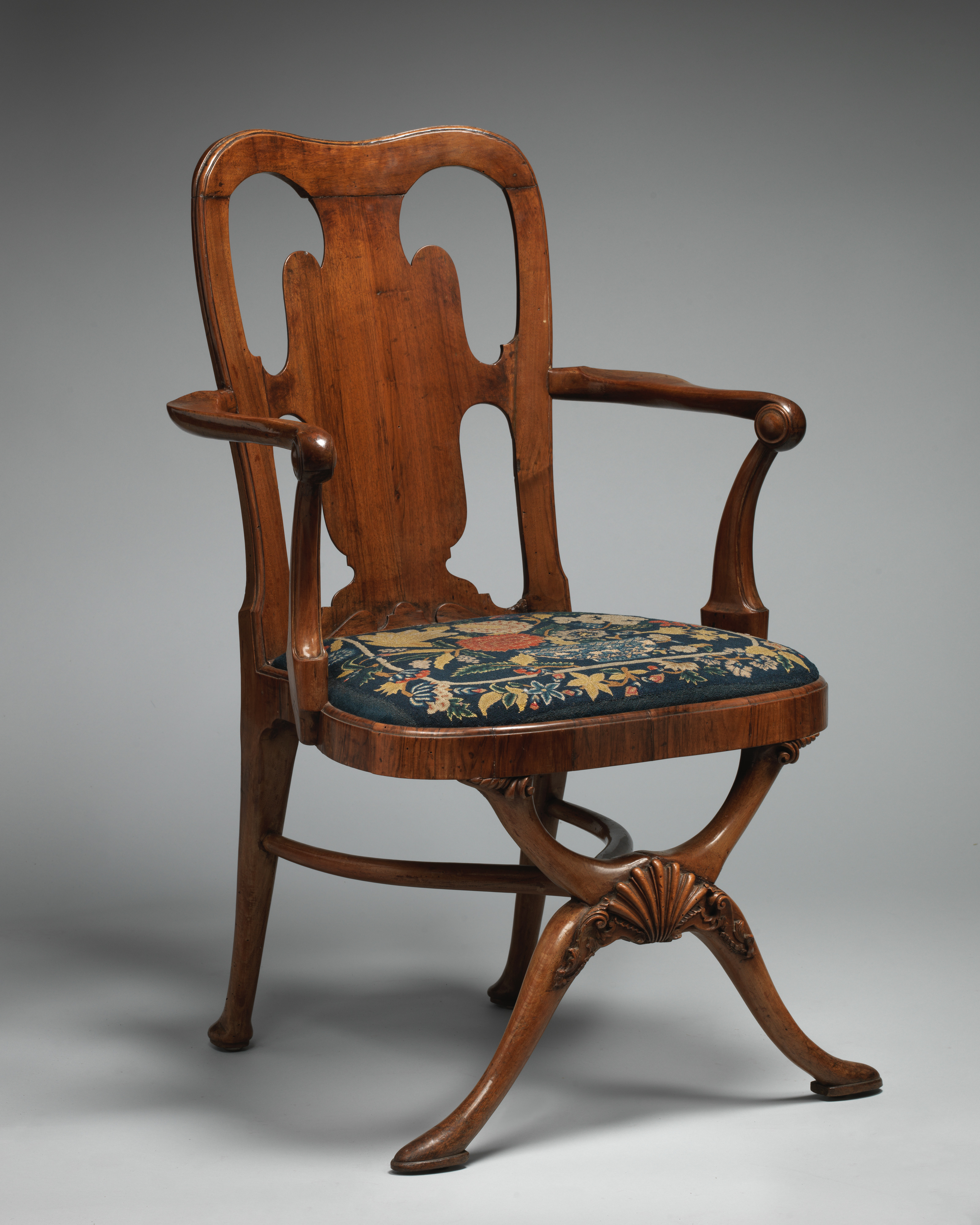
Armchair, British, circa 1720

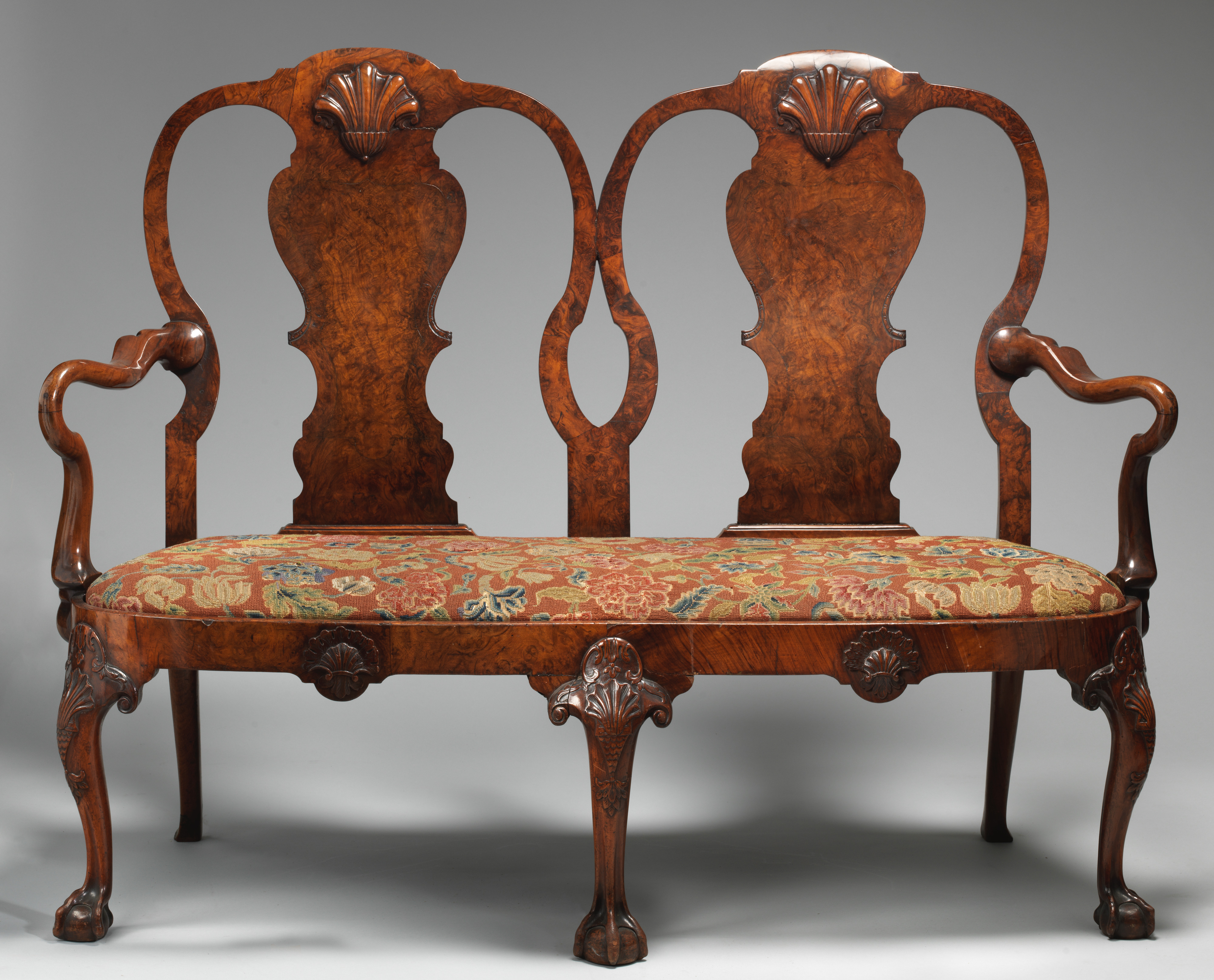
Settee, British, circa 1720

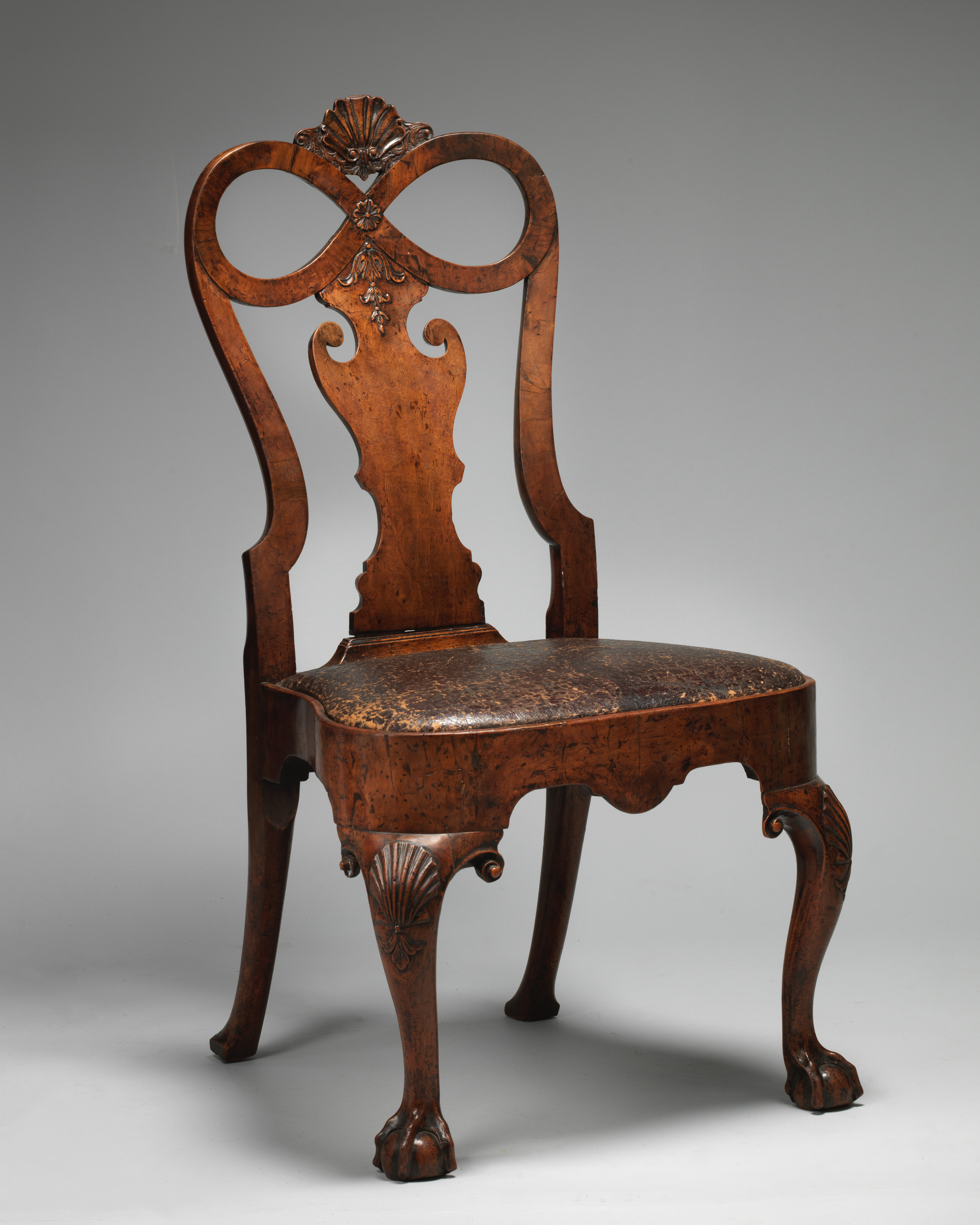
Side chair, British, circa 1730

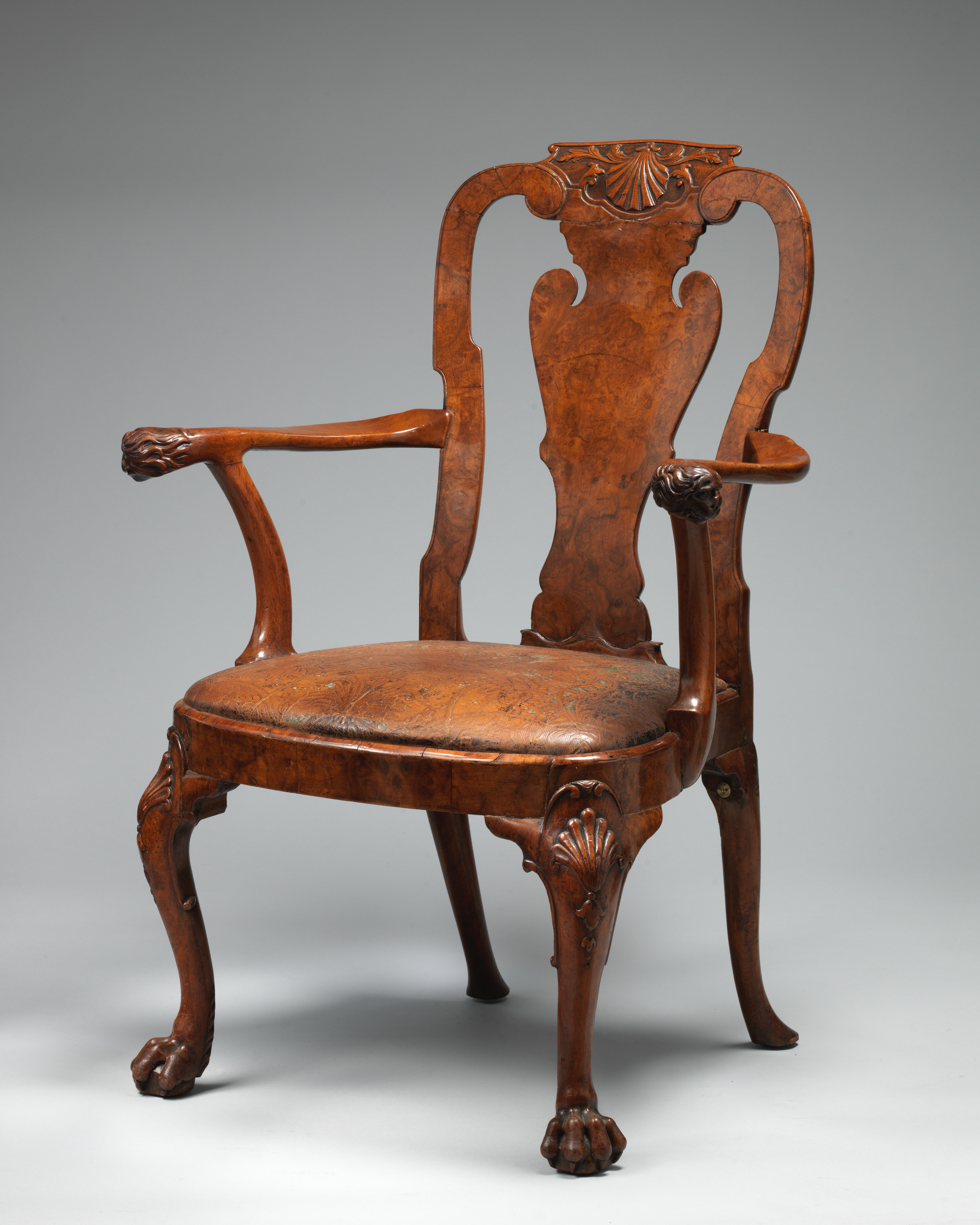
Armchair, British, circa 1730

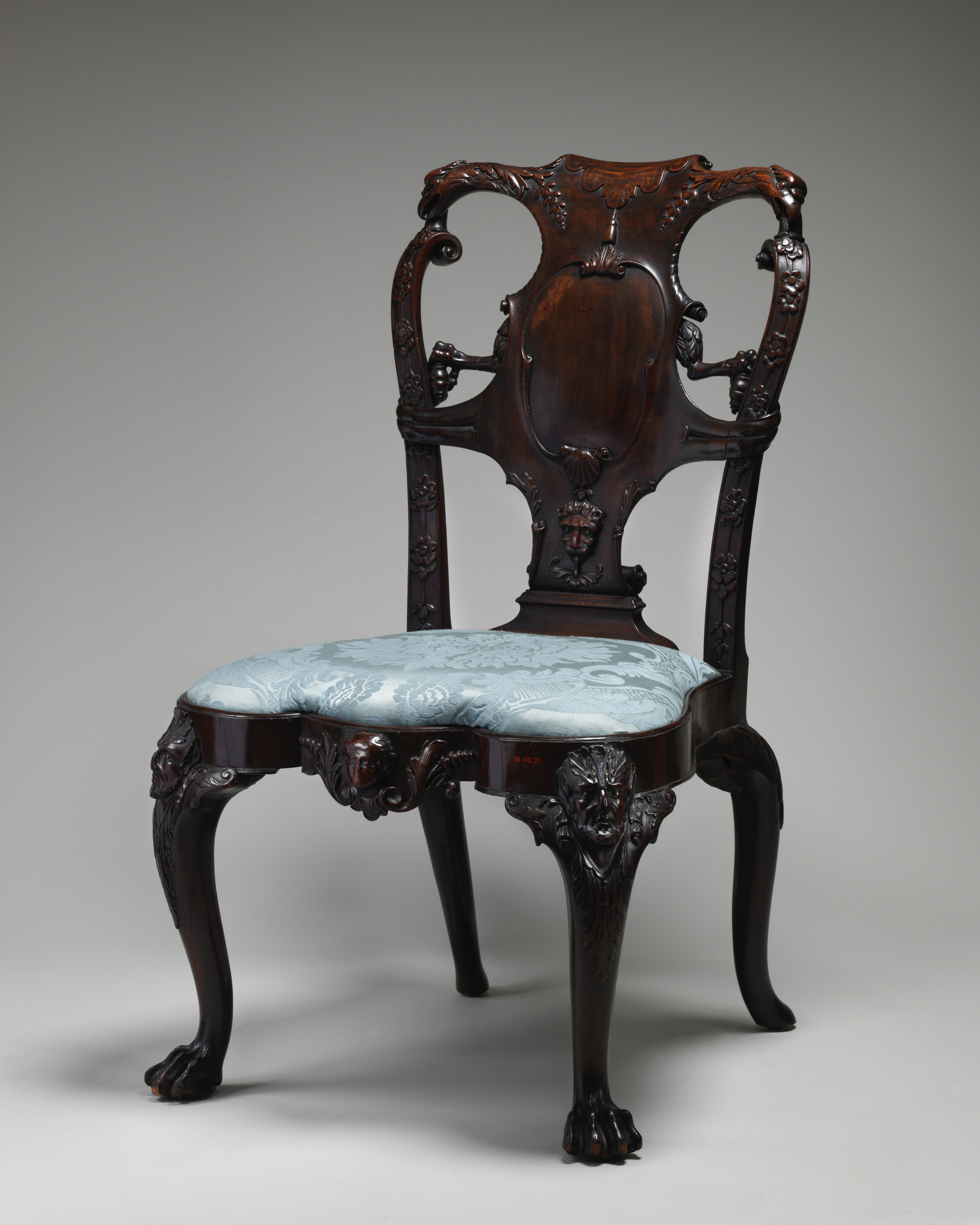
Chair, British, circa 1730–40

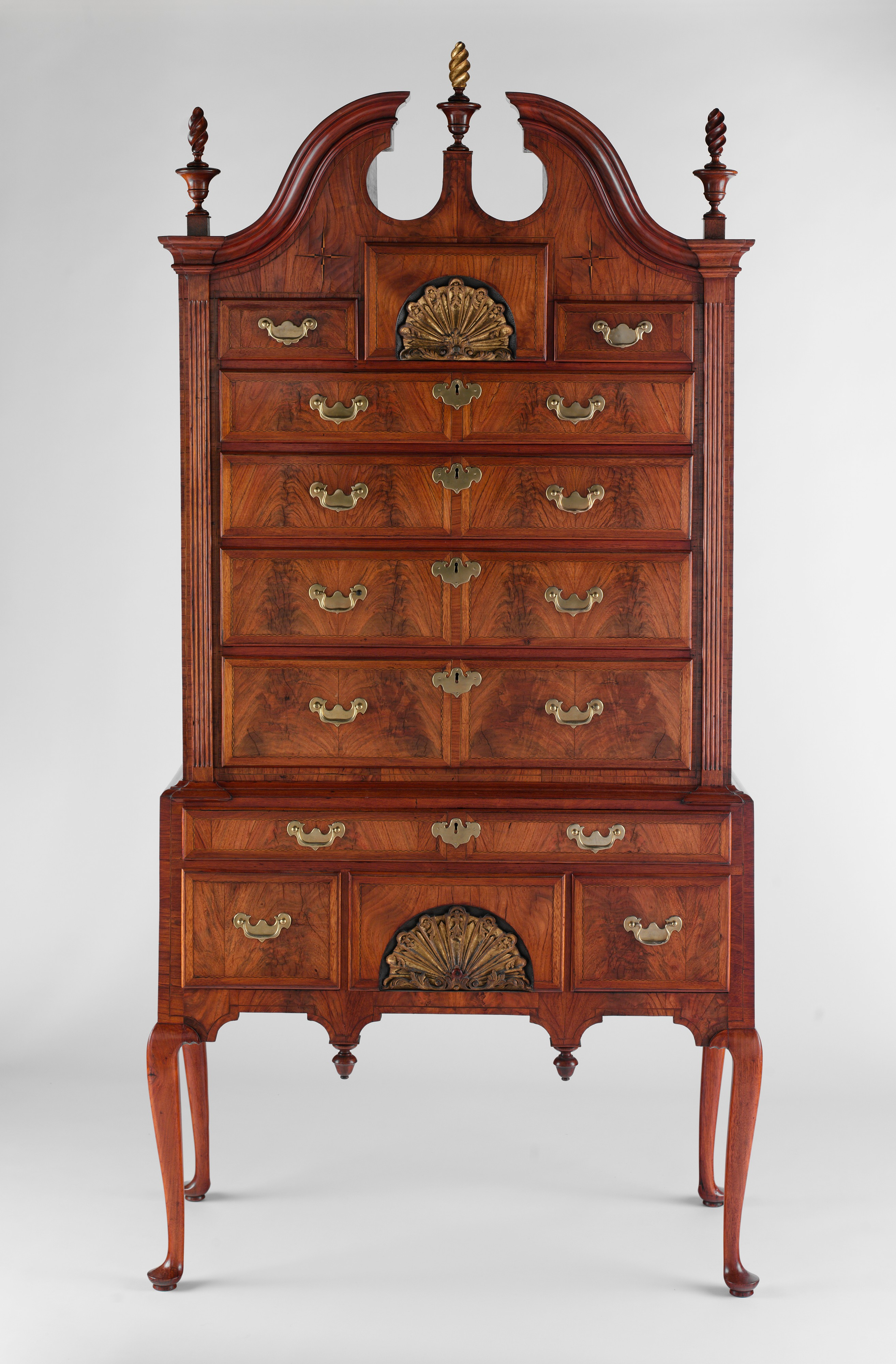
High Chest of Drawers, American, 1730–40

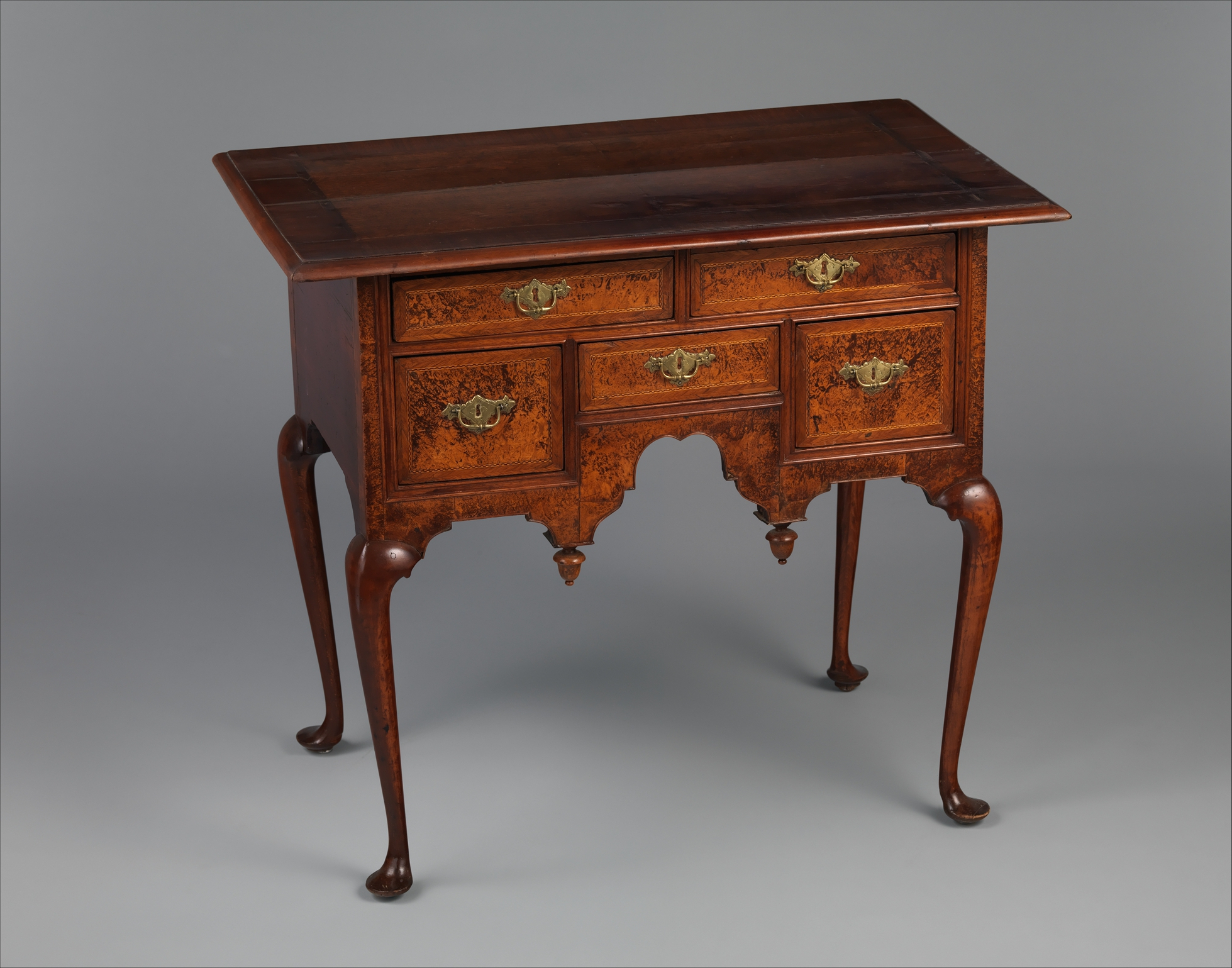
Dressing table, American, 1730–60

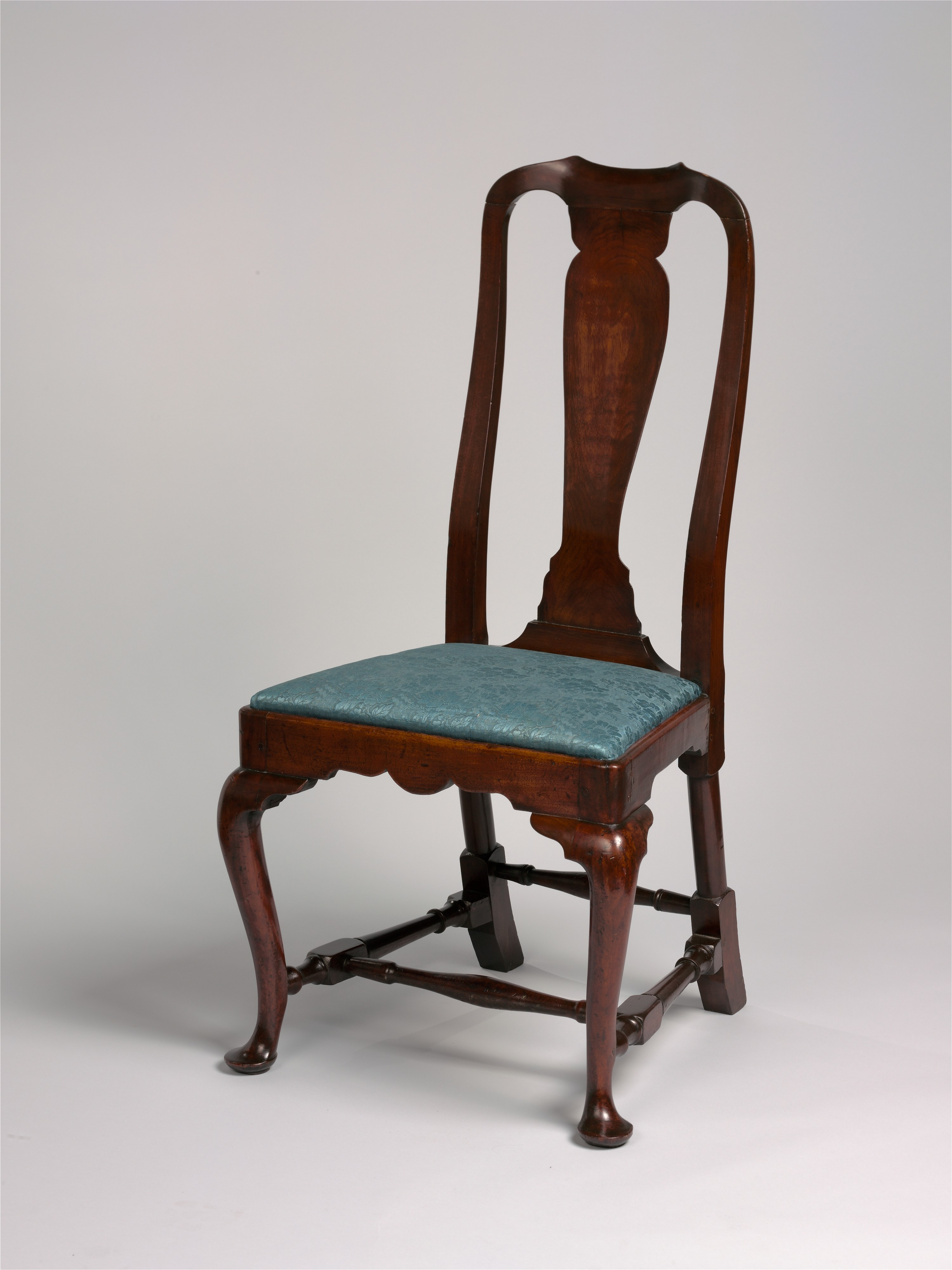
Side Chair, American, 1730–90

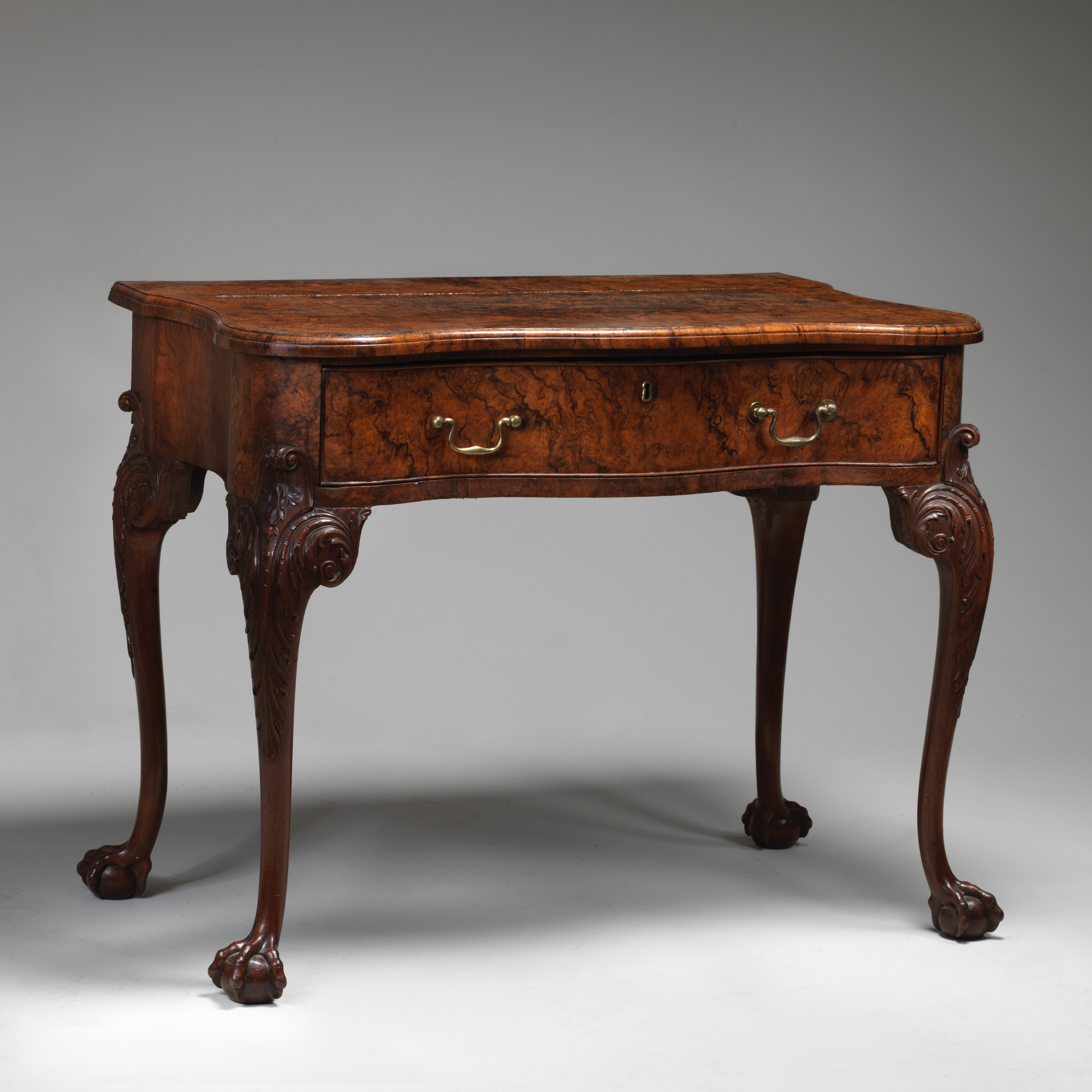
Side table, British, circa 1735

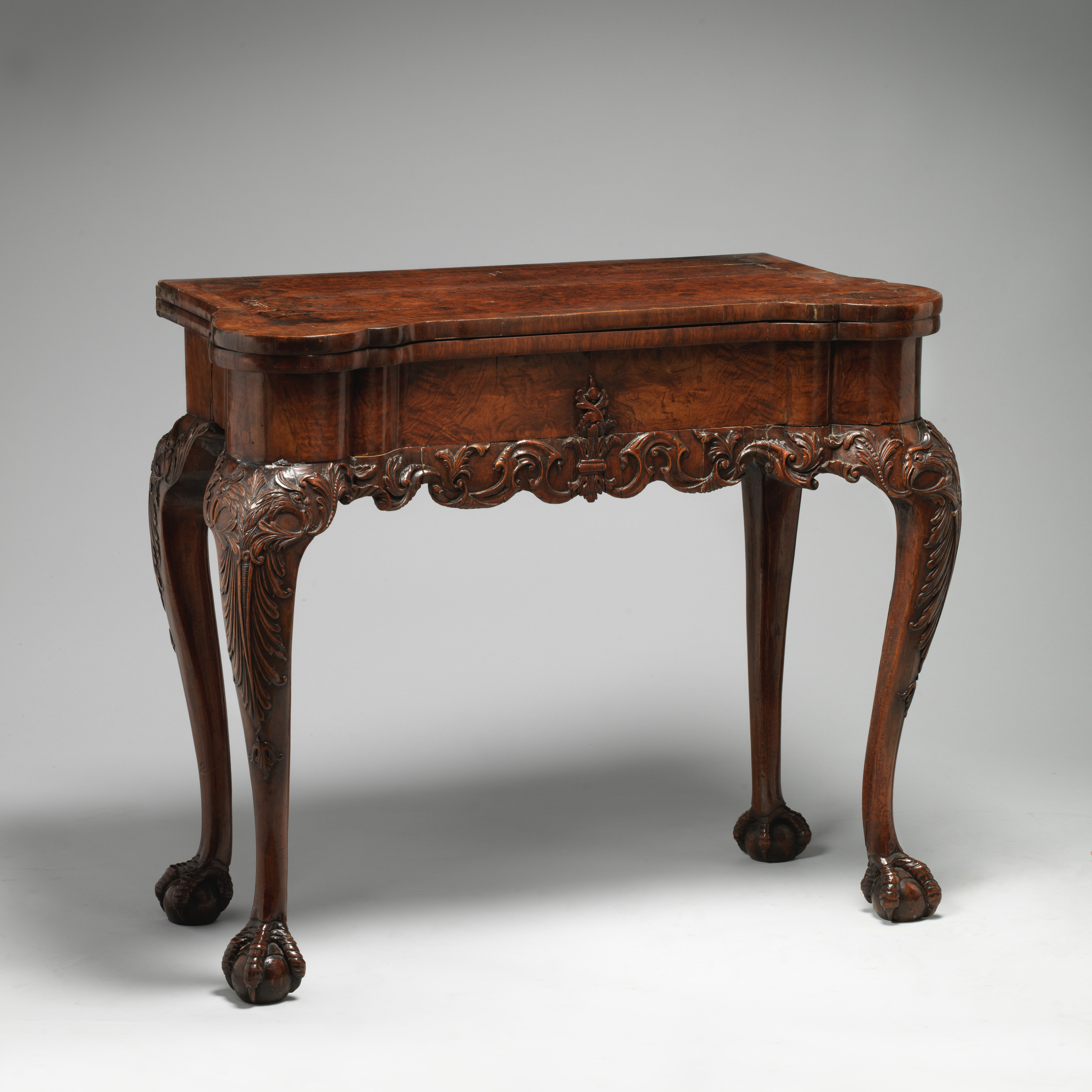
Card table, British, circa 1735

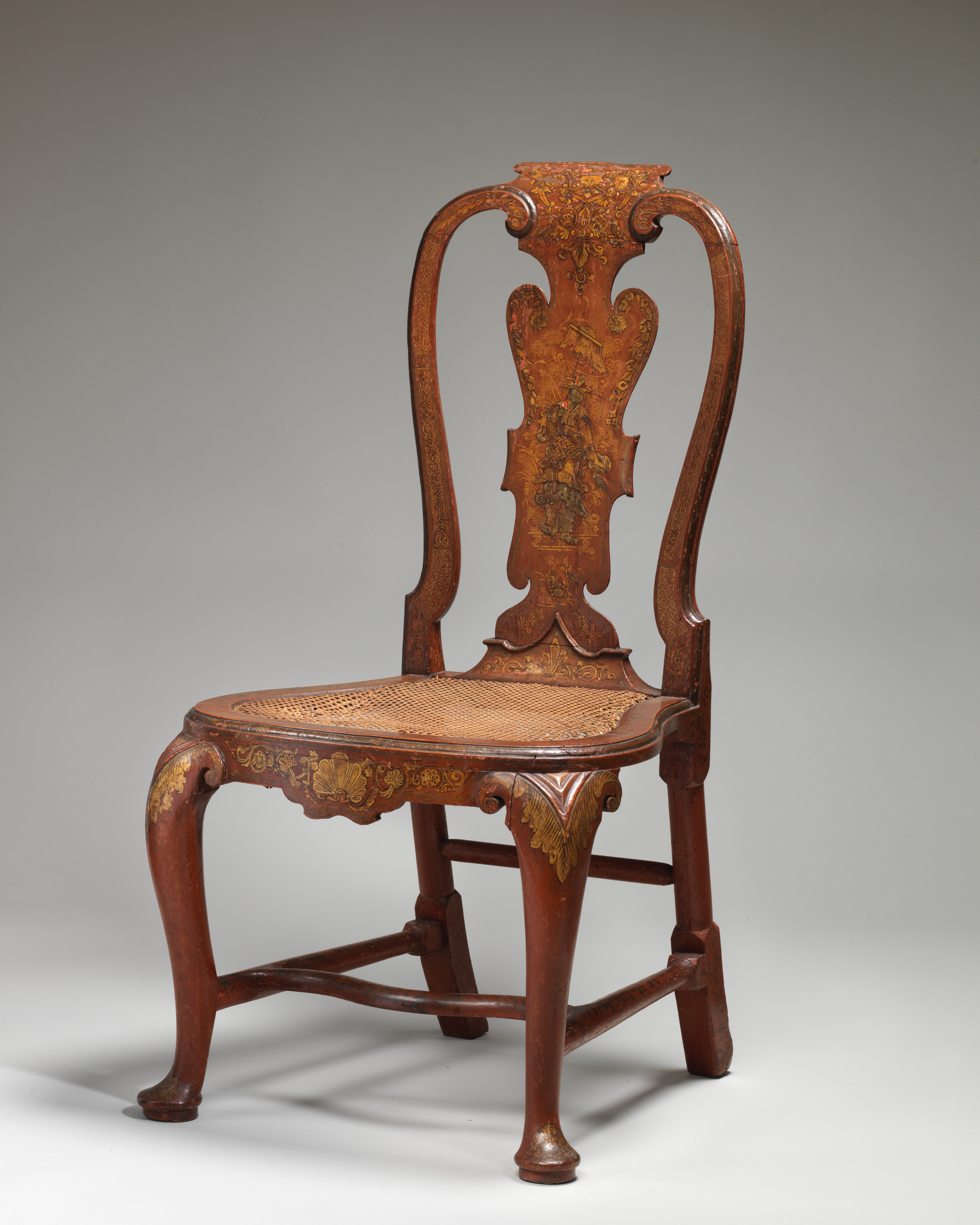
Side chair, British, circa 1735–40

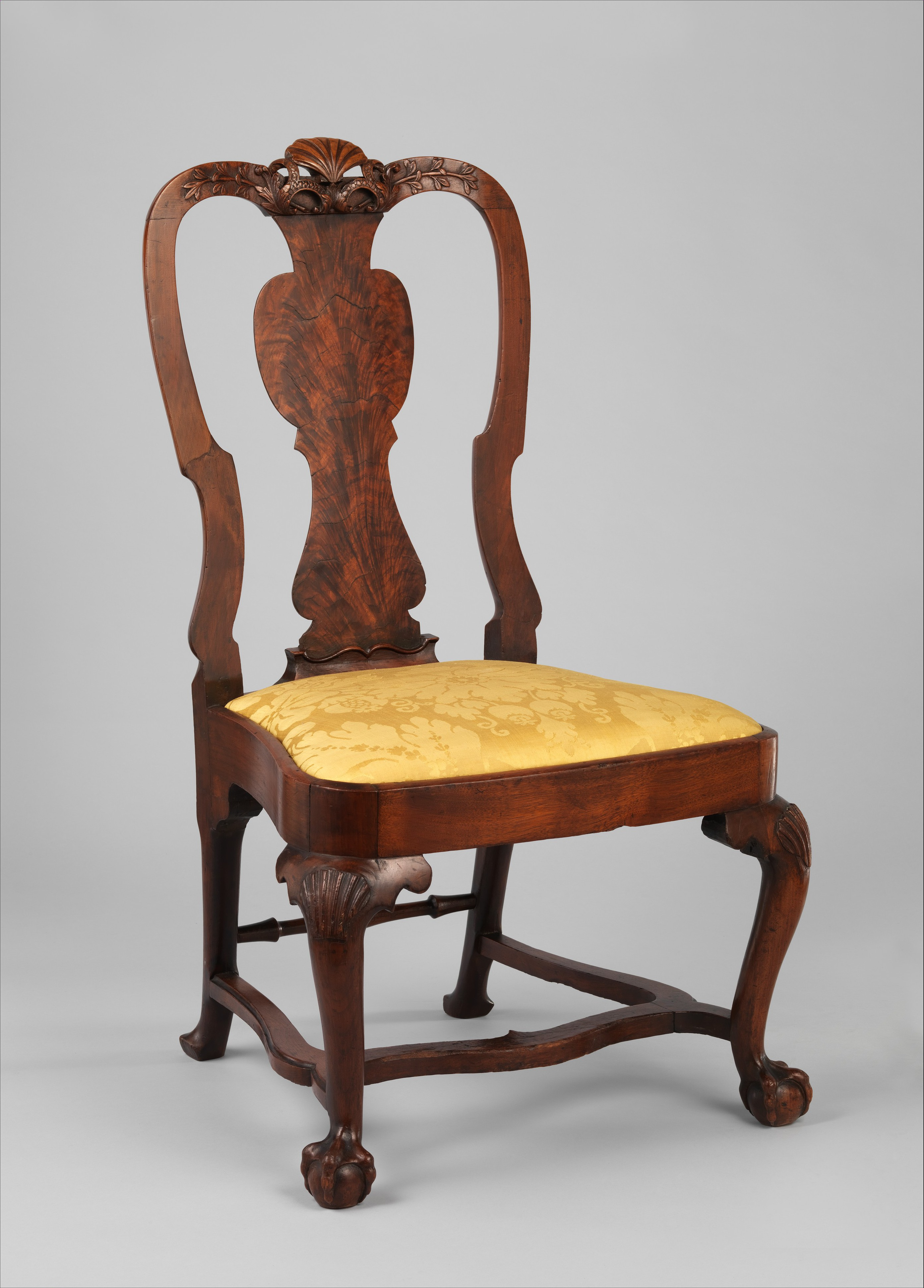
Side chair, American, 1735–60

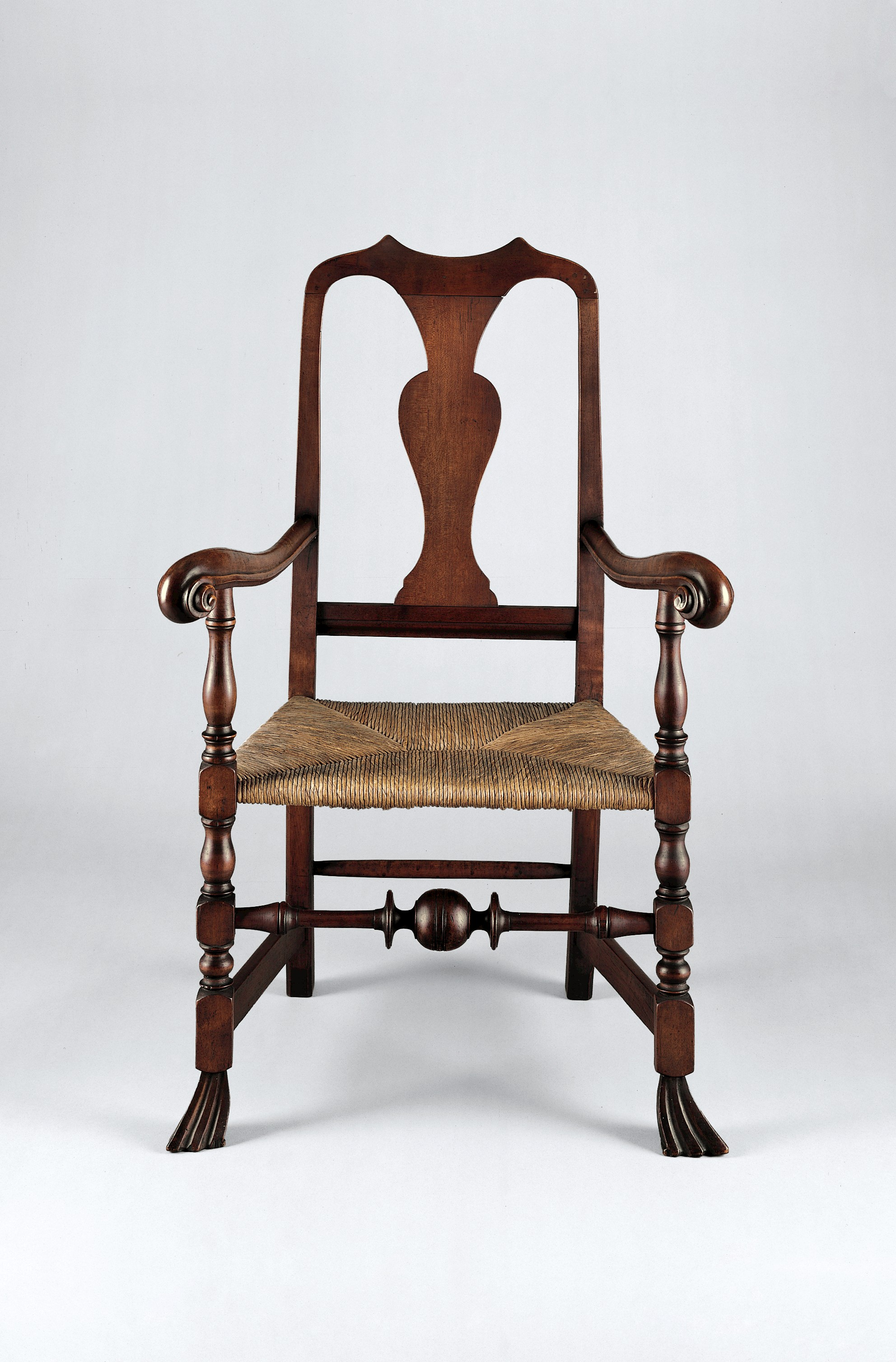
Armchair, American, 1735–60

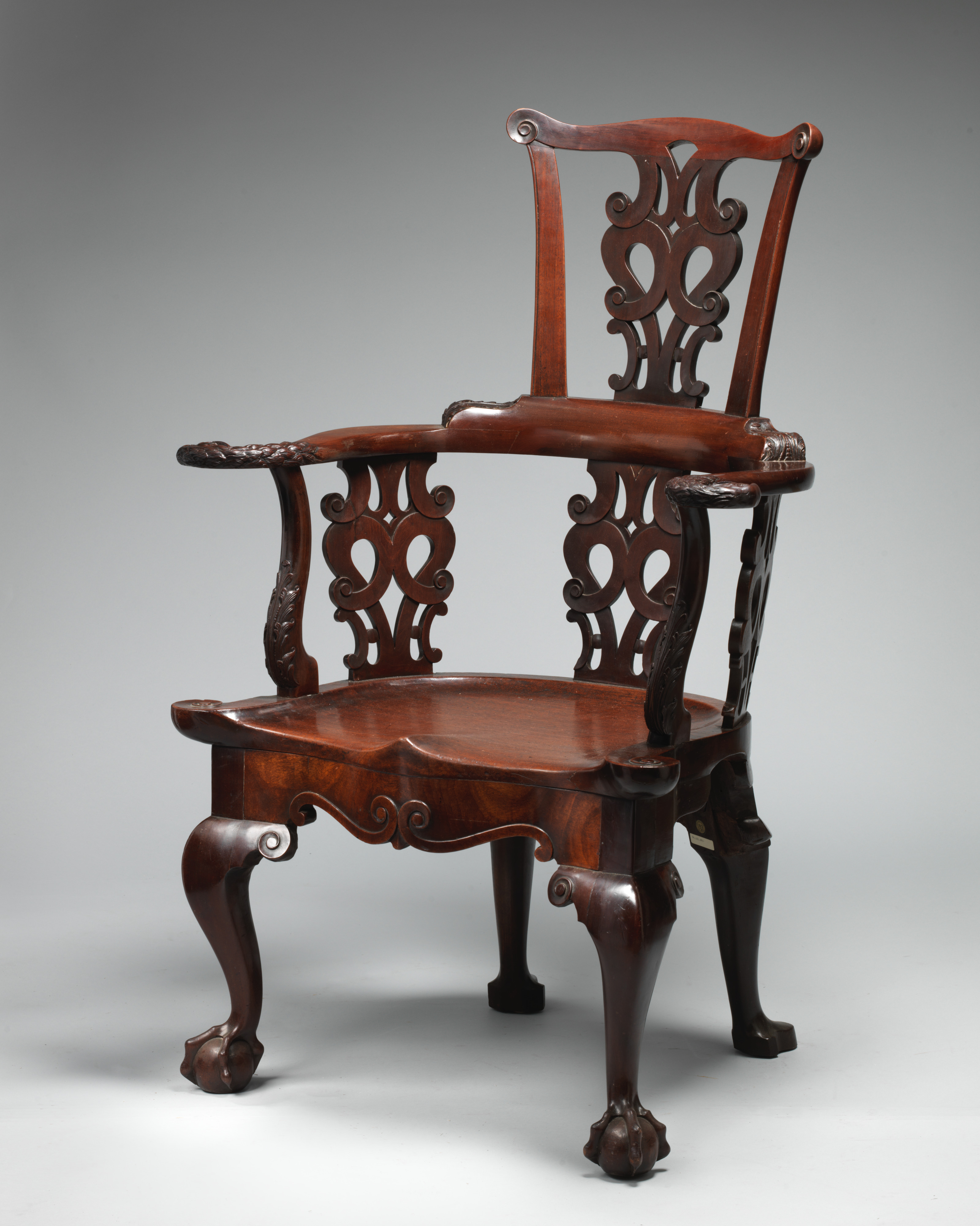
Armchair, British, circa 1740

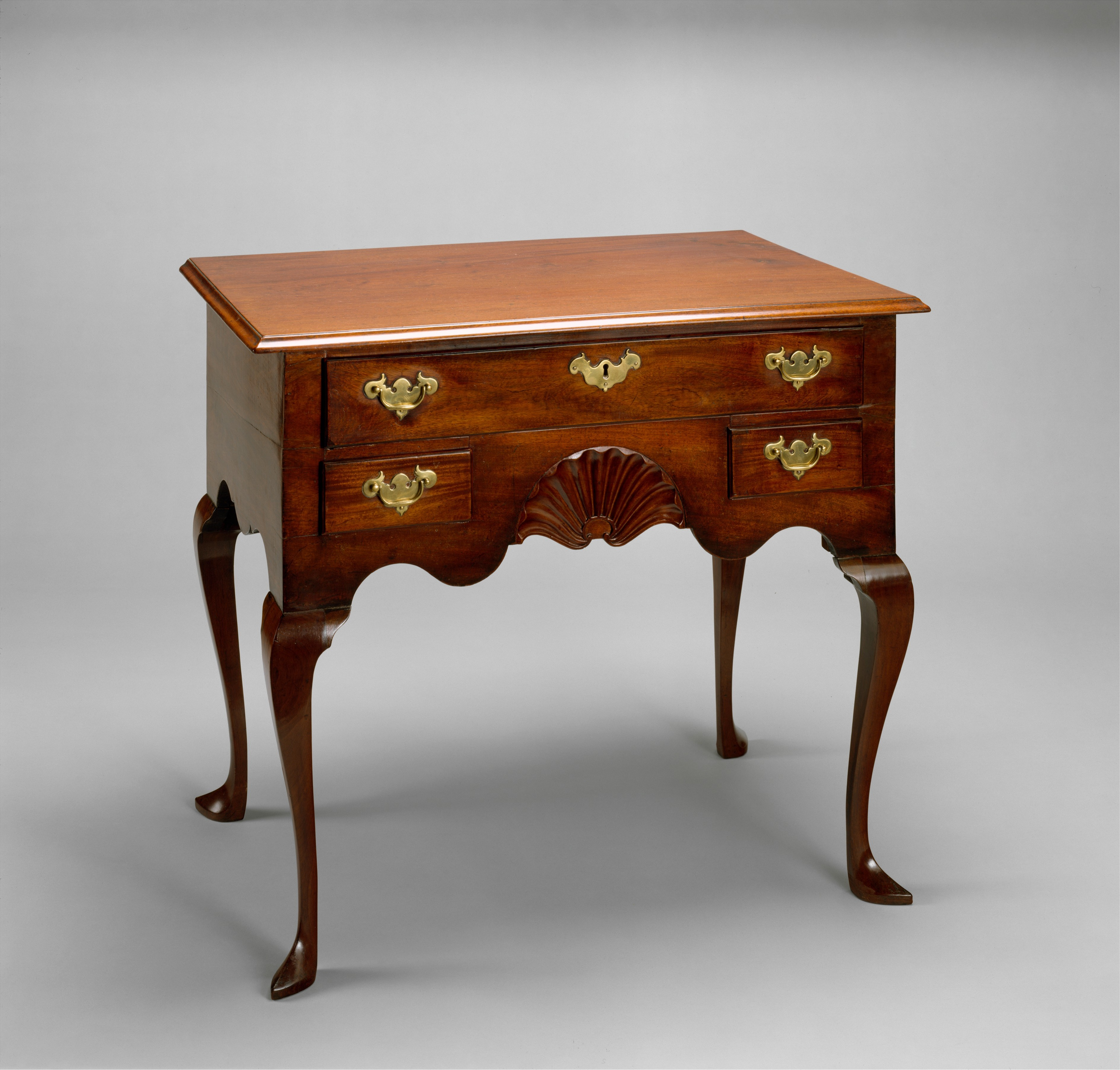
Dressing Table, American, 1740–50

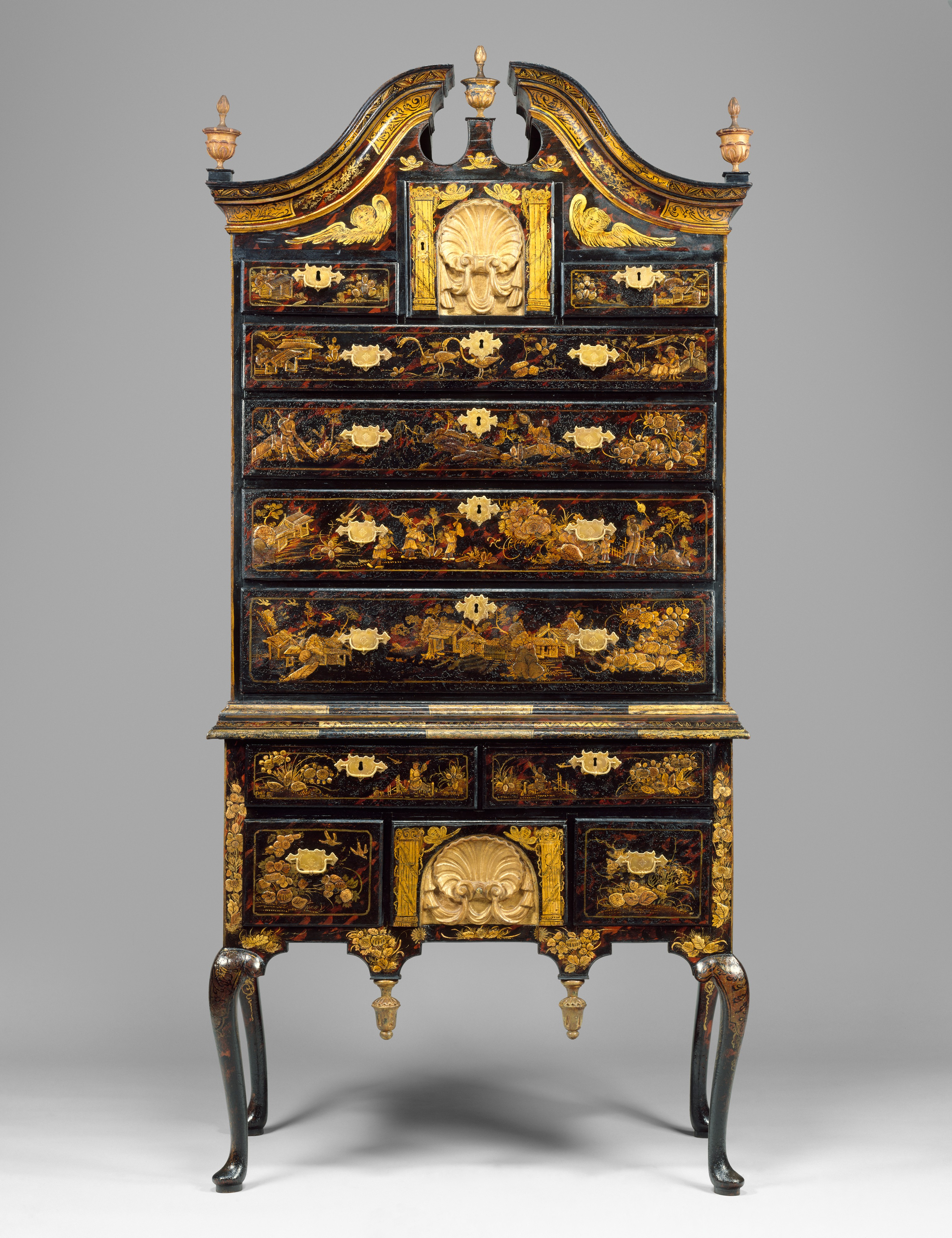
High chest of drawers, American, 1740–60

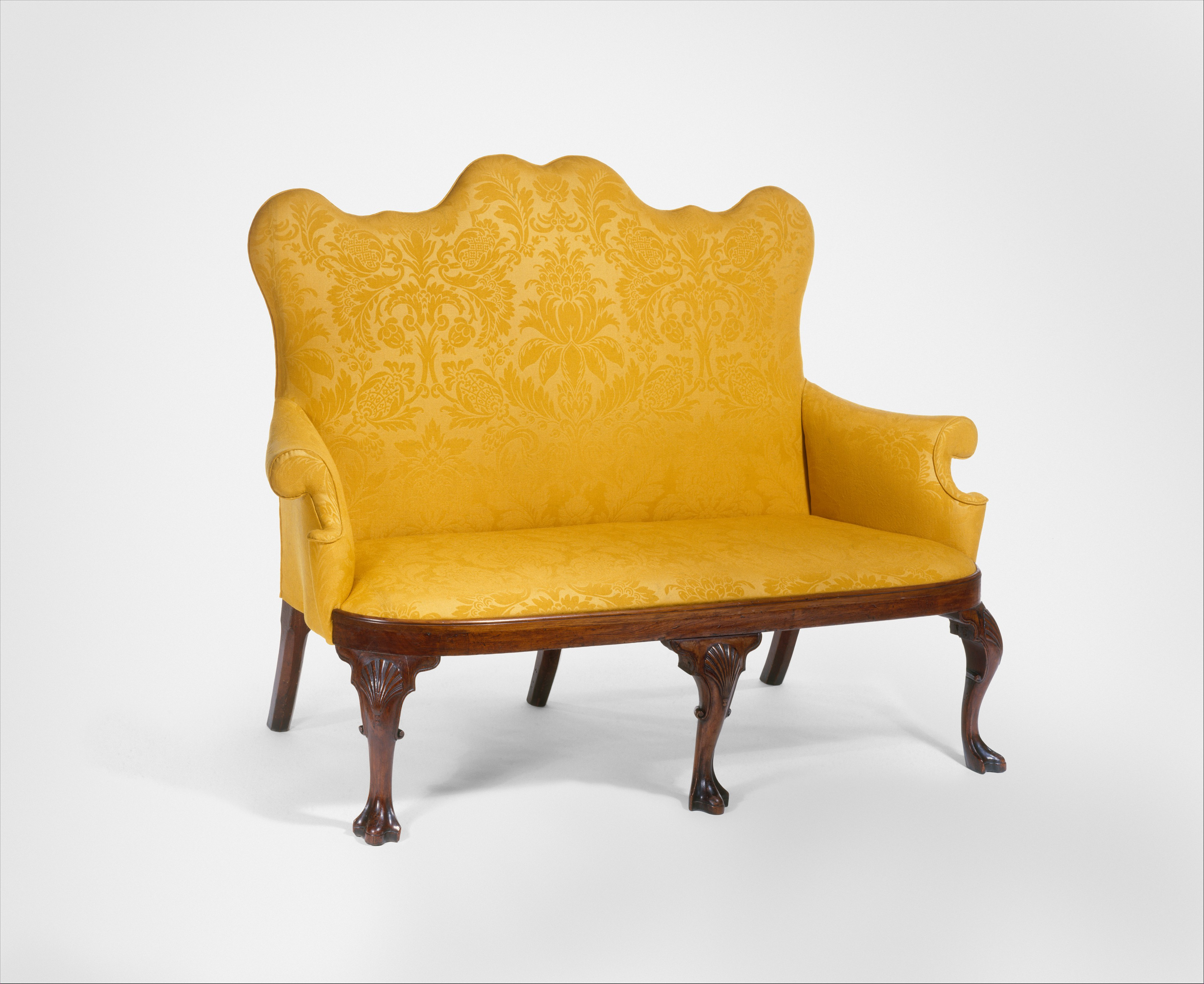
Settee, American, 1740–60

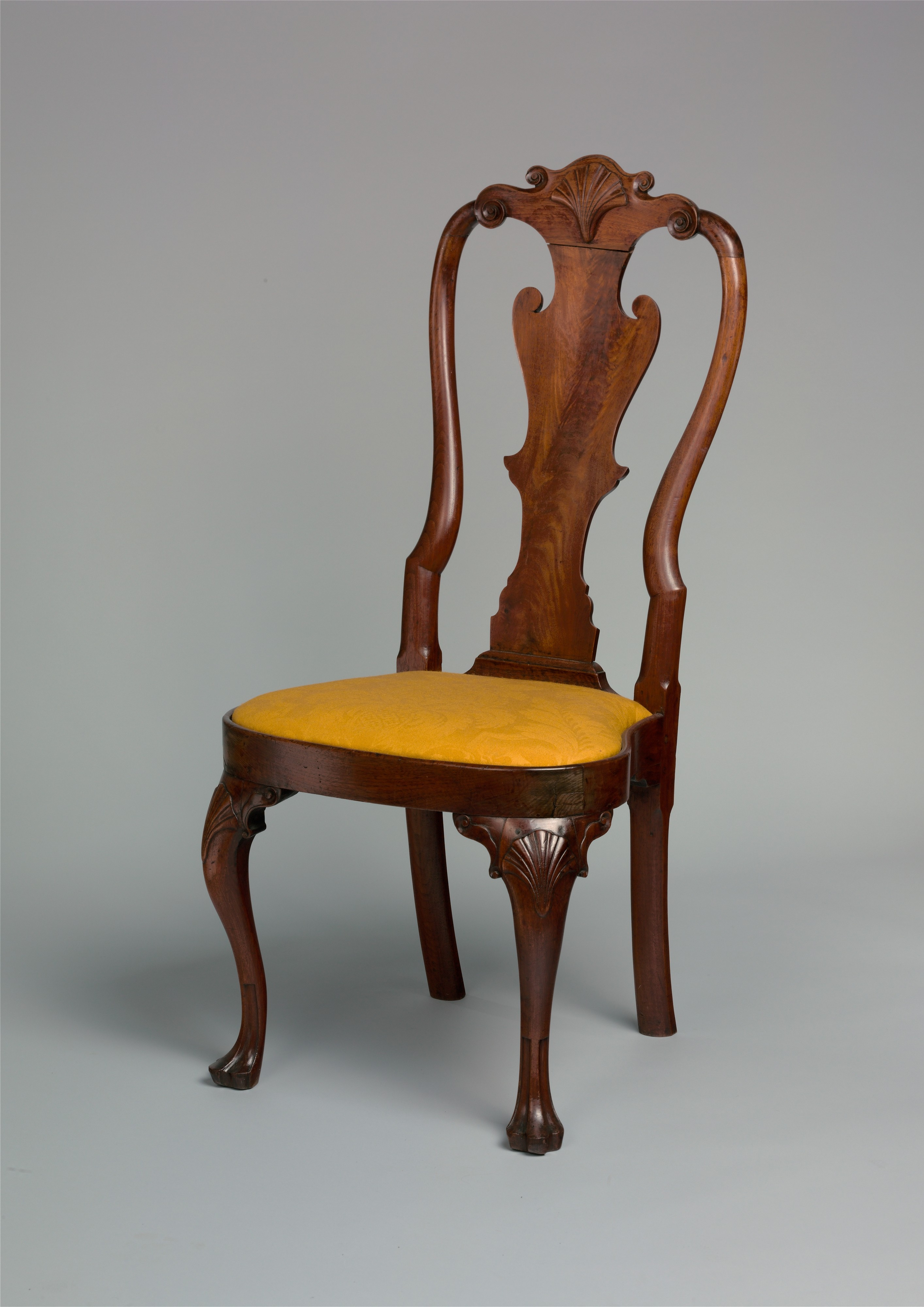
Side Chair, American, 1740–60

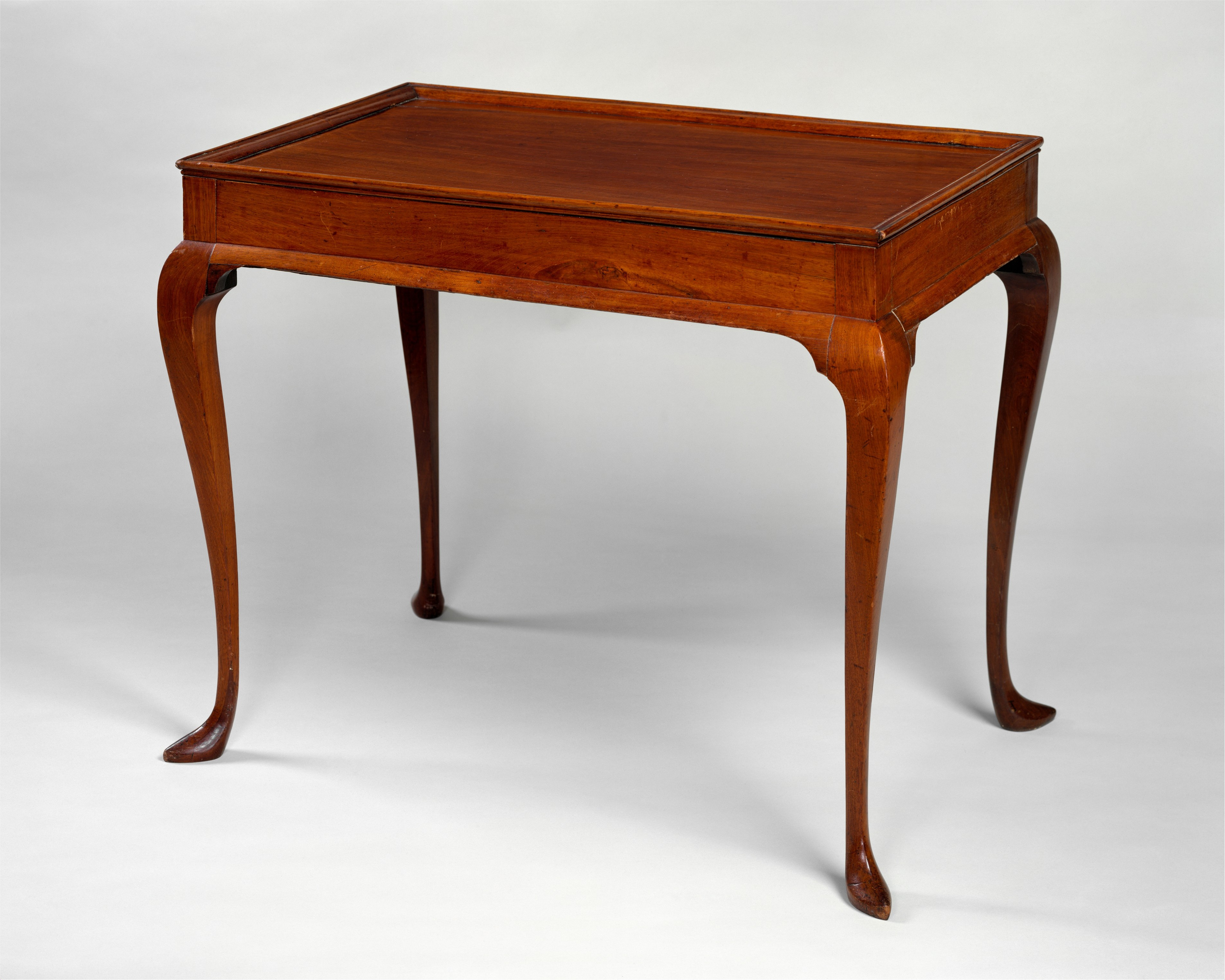
Square Tea Table, American, 1740–60

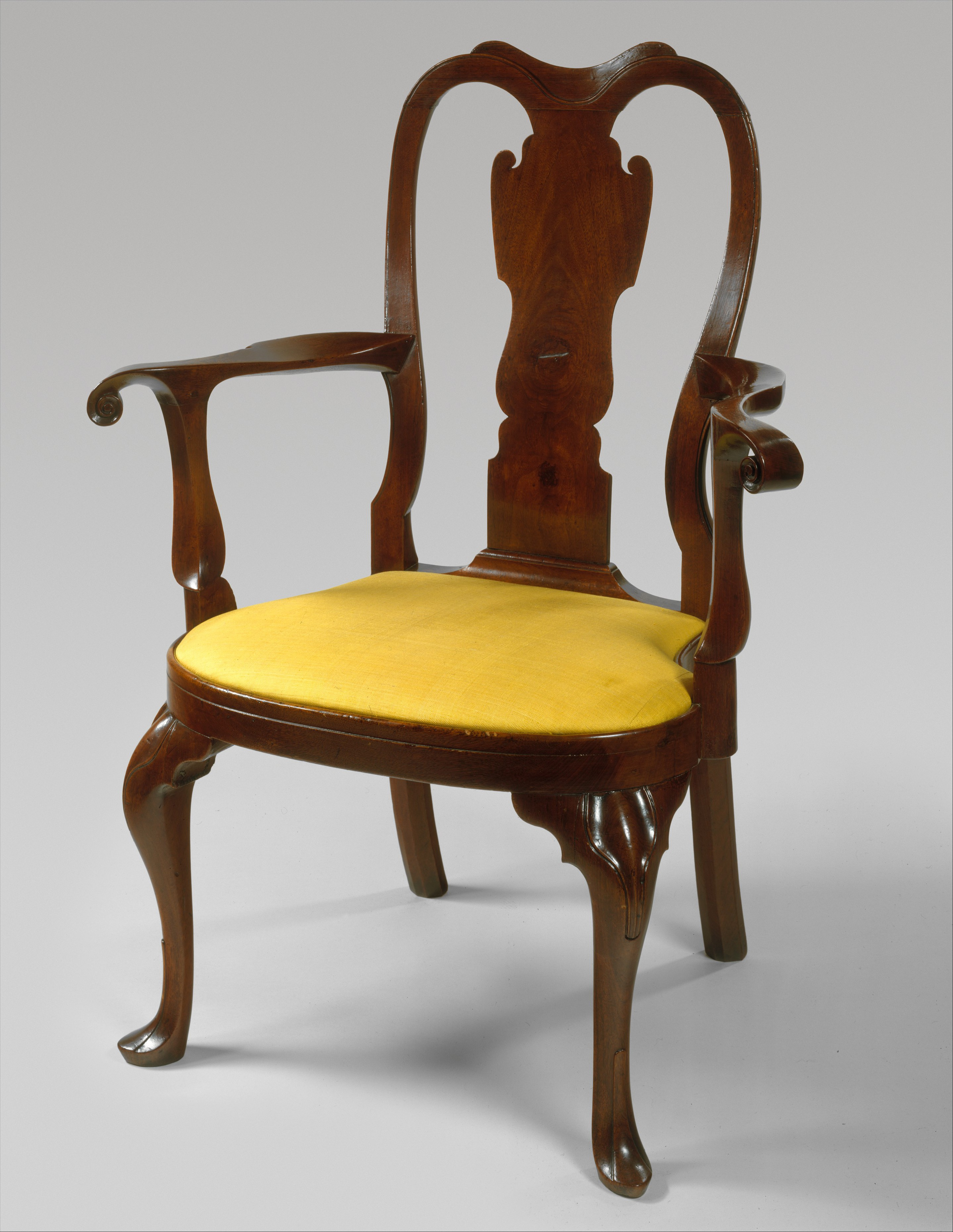
Armchair, American, 1740–60

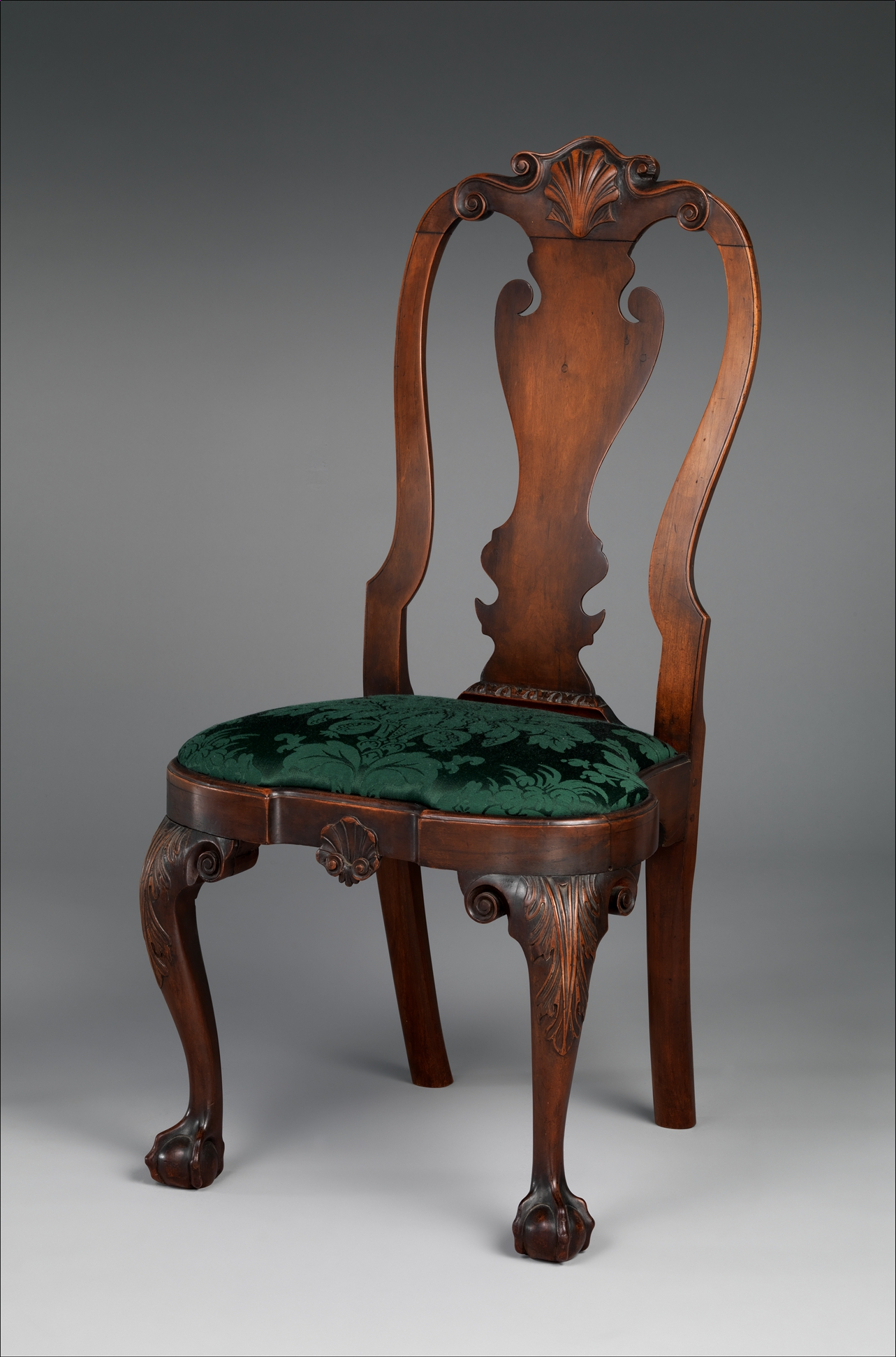
Side chair, American, 1740–60

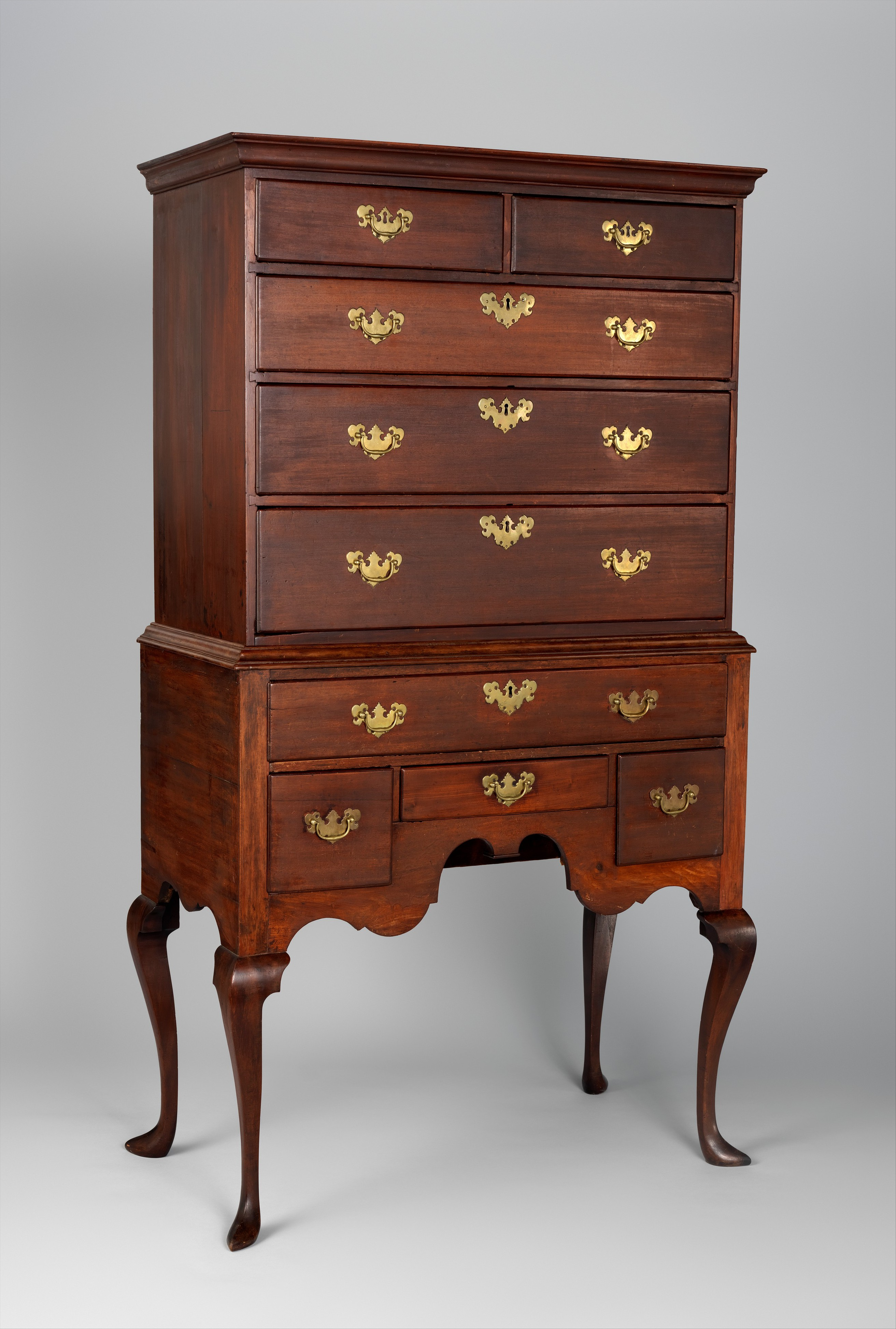
High chest, American, Maker: Christopher Townsend (1701–1773), 1748

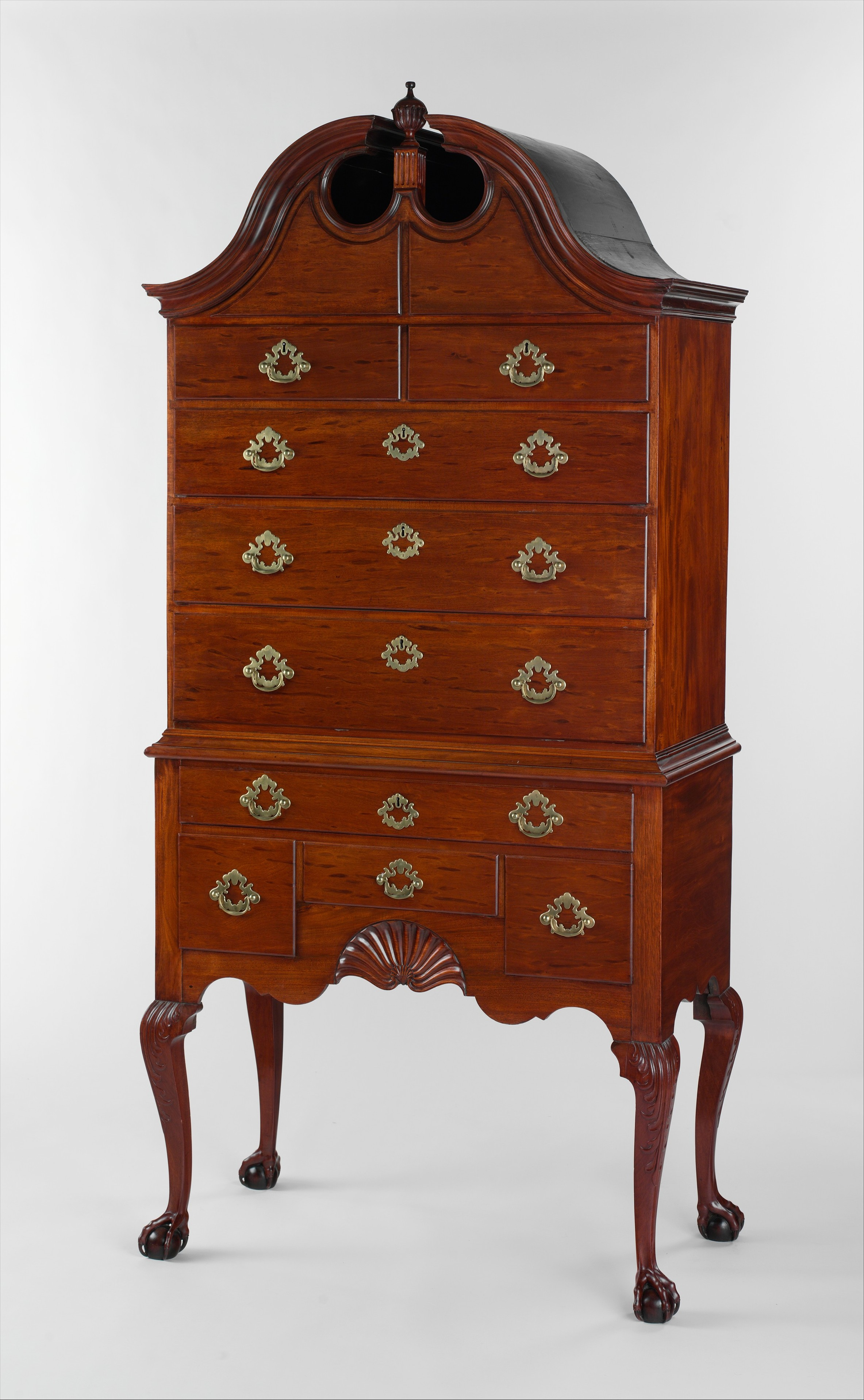
High Chest of Drawers, American, 1750–90

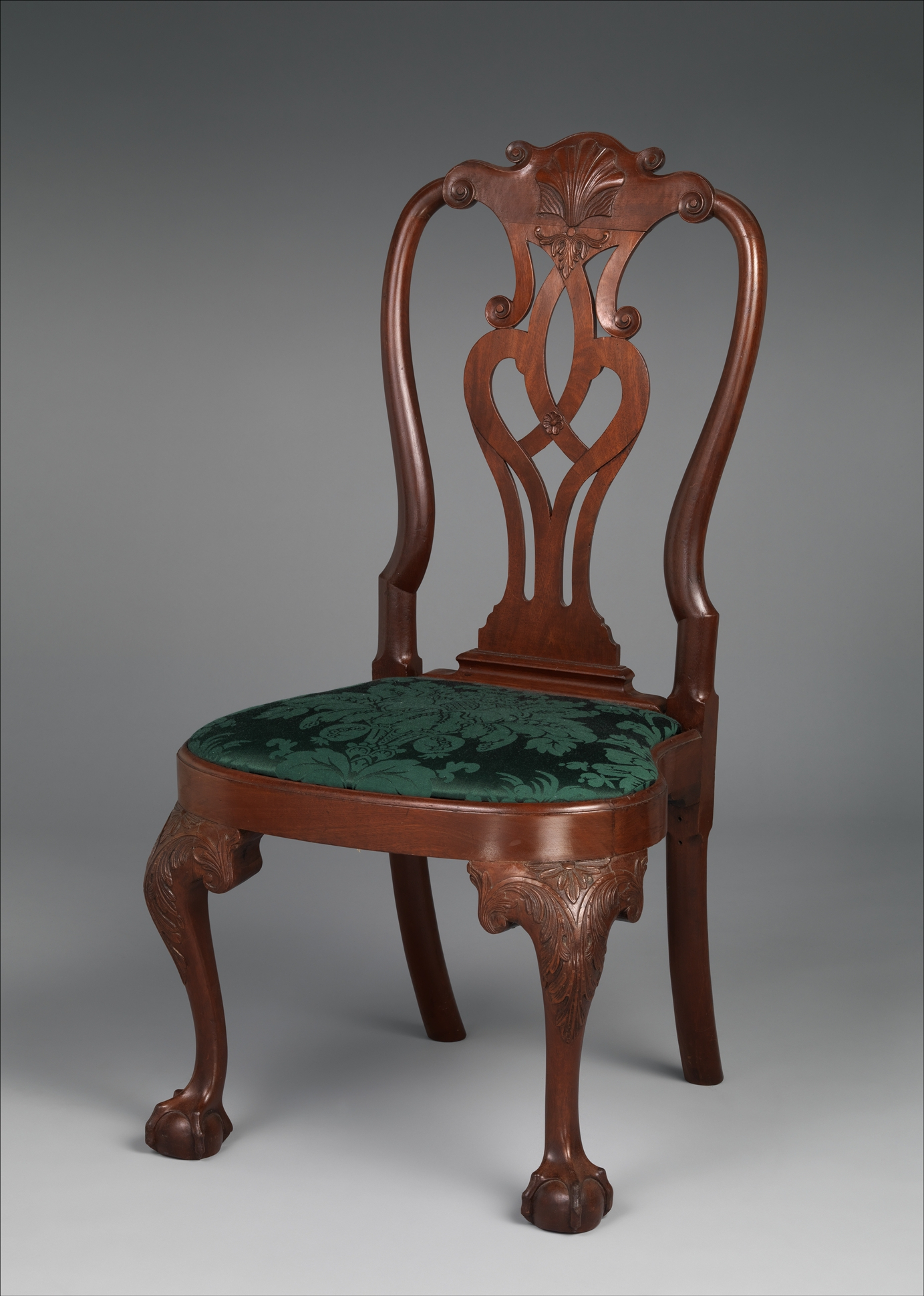
Side chair, American, 1755–75

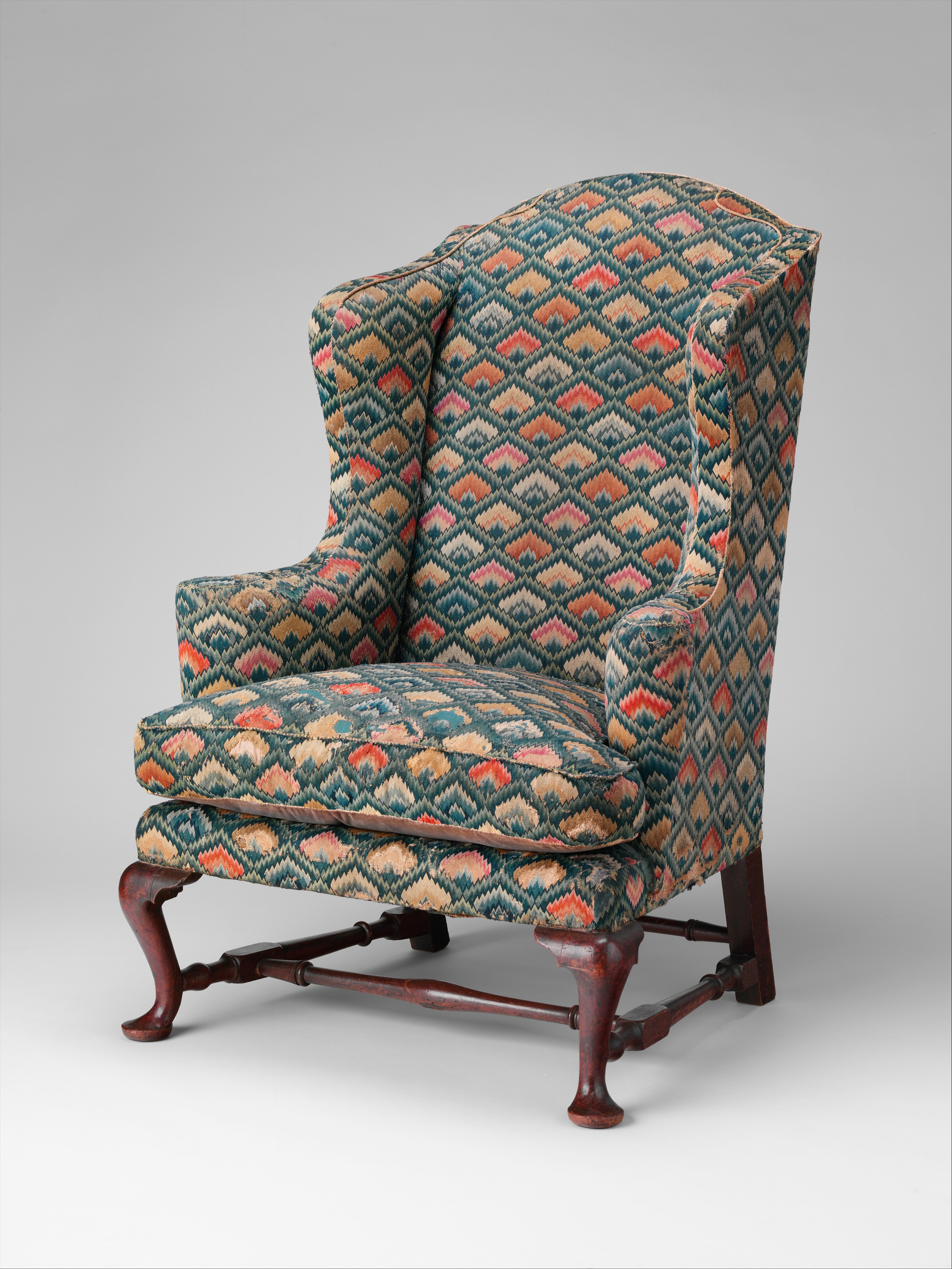
Easy Chair, American, 1758
