= John Cobb (cabinetmaker) =

English cabinetmaker and upholsterer

John Cobb (c.1710–1778) was an English cabinetmaker and upholsterer.

== Biography ==
It is believed that John Cobb was apprenticed in 1729 to Timothy Money (fl 1724–59), a Norwich upholsterer. In 1755 he married Sukey, a daughter of the cabinetmaker Giles Grendey, and is said to have acquired a ‘singularly haughty character’, strutting ‘in full dress of the most superb and costly kind...through his workshops giving orders to his men’, and on one occasion earning a rebuke from George III. (Note: J T Smith in his Nollekens recounts anecdotes of his pompous behaviour and comments on his tendency to elaborate costume.) He worked with William Vile from 1750 until 1765 in premises at No, 72, the corner house of St Martin's Lane & Long Acre. In the early 1750s, William Hallett, a leading cabinetmaker of the time, financially backed Vile and Cobb and formed a working syndicate with them, Vile was also from Crewkerne, and began his career as William Hallett’s journeyman. Vile and Cobb supplied furniture to the leading patrons of the day including George III and Queen Charlotte, the 1st Earl of Leicester at Holkham Hall, the 4th Duke of Devonshire at Chatsworth and the 4th Duke of Bedford at Woburn Abbey.

Vile and Cobb held the Royal Warrant from 1761 until April 1764 when Vile retired. While Vile created works in an Anglicized Rococo style, Cobb’s furniture of the 1770s was executed in an elegant Neoclassical style. Cobb was well known for his haughty disposition which did not always endear him to his customers, so it was no surprise that the Royal Warrant was awarded to two of their employees William France and John Bradburne instead of Cobb himself. Some of Cobb's work is in the Royal Collection at Buckingham Palace.

Following Vile's retirement in 1764, Cobb carried on in business with the assistance of his foreman, Samuel Reynolds (fl 1751–85). He made furniture to very high standards and earned a reputation for exquisite marquetry: Hester Thrale, the writer and friend of Dr Johnson, compared the inlaid floors at Sceaux, France, to ‘the most high prized Cabinet which Mr Cobb can produce to captivate the Eyes of his Customers’. Inlay in tropical woods, particularly satinwood, was an important element of Neo-classical furniture. In 1772–4 Cobb produced an ‘Extra neat Inlaid Commode’ and two stands en suite for Paul Methuen at Corsham Court, Wilts, which survive in situ. In 1772 he was implicated in the smuggling of furniture from France. His most extensive work was for the 6th Earl of Coventry at Croome Court, Worcs, between 1765 and 1773. This included a large mahogany wardrobe and extensive seating in the new Neo-classical style. It is recorded that he received commissions for work at a number of other houses, including Burton Hall, Lincs, Uppark, W. Sussex, Audley End, Essex, and David Garrick’s villa at Hampton, Middx. Furniture was also supplied for Strawberry Hill, home of Horace Walpole from 1760 to 1771. (Note: Horace Walpole in his Description of Strawberry Hill, refers to the furniture which Mr. Cobb made for the bed in the Holbein Chamber as – 'of purple cloth lined with white satin, a plume of white and purple feathers on the centre of the tester'.)

After Cobb’s death in 1778, Samuel Reynolds operated in partnership with John Graham at Cobb’s address at 72 St Martin’s Lane, London, until 1785.

== Sources ==
- Geoffrey Castle – 'The France Family of Upholsterers and Cabinet-Makers' – Furniture History Society Journal Vol XLI pp 25–43, Published 2005
- G Beard & C Gilbert – 'Dictionary of English Furniture Makers 1660–1840' 1986 – Furniture History Society (ISBN 0 901286 18 4)
