= William Vile =

English cabinetmaker

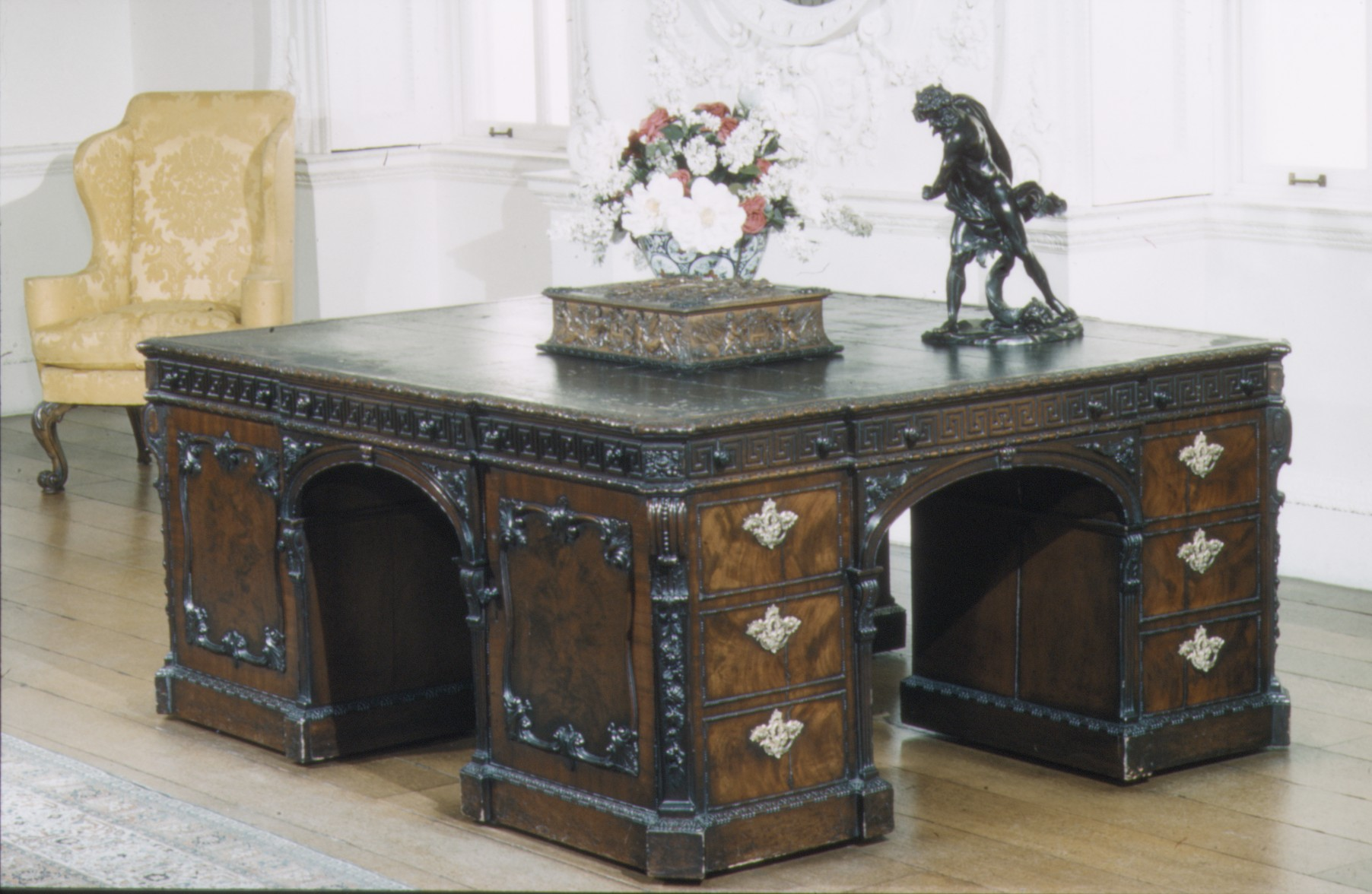
Library table by William Vile, Cuban mahogany, veneered on oak, c. 1760, Metropolitan Museum of Art

William Vile (c. 1700 – September 1767) was an English cabinetmaker.

== Biography ==
Vile was one of the best English cabinetmakers of the Early Georgian Period (1745 – 1780), only overshadowed by Thomas Chippendale of the Late Georgian Period (1750 – 1830). Vilé was amongst a handful of London-based cabinetmakers such as William Bradshaw, John Cobb, and John Gumley. Their standard of craftsmanship has been virtually unchallenged until the late 20th Century British Craft Revival with makers such as John Makepeace and his lesser known apprentice Andrew Whateley demonstrating unrivalled craftsmanship.

William Vile went into partnership with John Cobb in 1750 until he retired in 1765, operating from premises at the corner of St Martin's Lane (No. 72) and Long Acre, London. They were Cabinet-makers and Upholsterers to His Majesty (George III) from 1761 to April 1764, based mainly on the superb quality of Vile's cabinet work and the individuality of his designs. The partners were not known as great innovators, but their standard of craftsmanship was seldom equalled. One outstanding piece was a jewel cabinet of mahogany, inlaid with ivory and various woods and exquisitely carved, made for Queen Charlotte in 1761.

Following Vile's retirement, the Royal Warrant was awarded to two of their employees William France and John Bradburne.
