= Giles Grendey =

British furniture designer

- Born: 1693
- Died: 1780 (aged 86–87)
- Relatives: John Cobb (son-in-law)

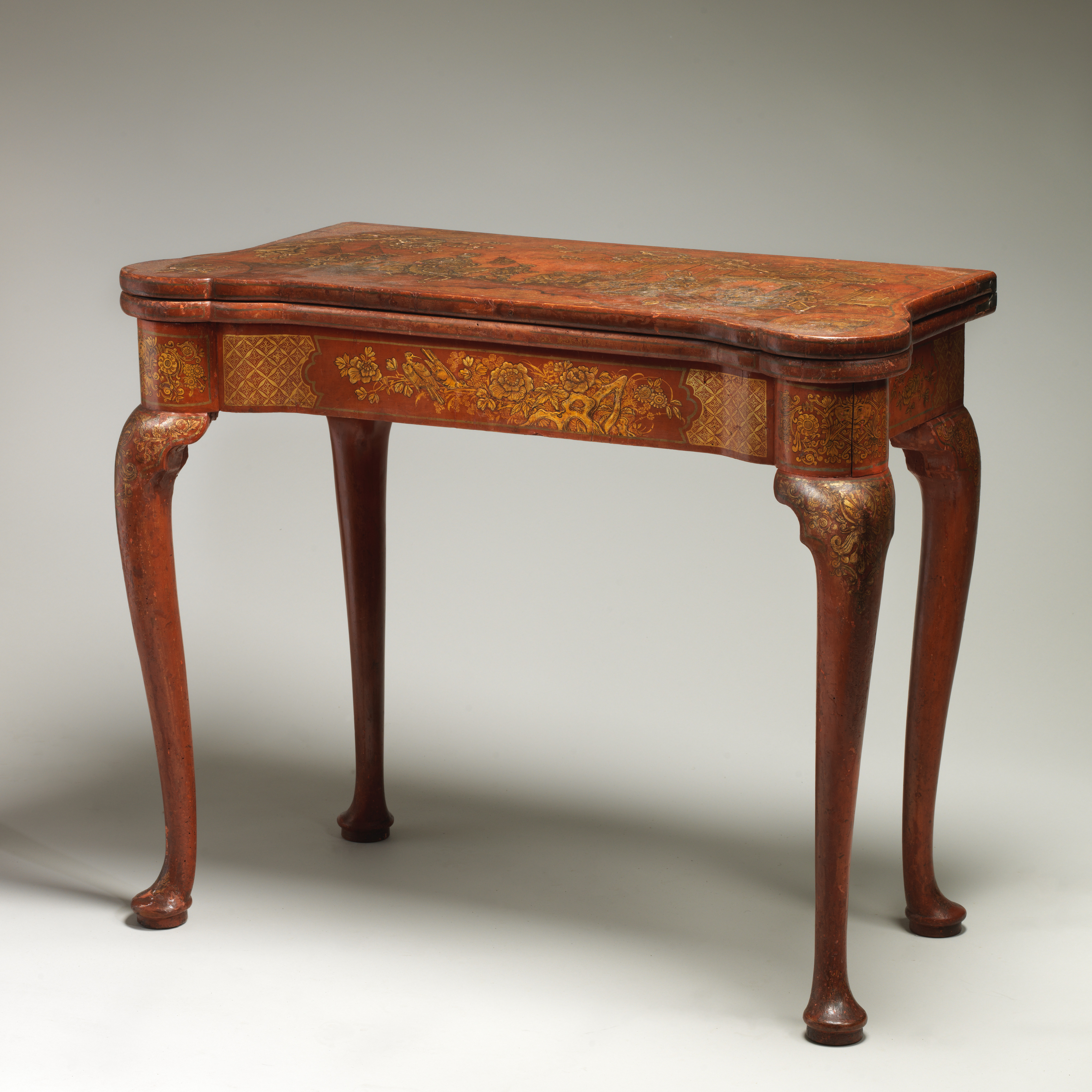
A card table designed by Grendey.

Giles Grendey (1693-1780) was a British furniture designer. His work can be seen at the Metropolitan Museum of Art in New York City.
