= Gettysburg furniture companies =

Furniture manufacturing grew in Gettysburg, in the U.S. state of Pennsylvania. After expanding in the early 1900s it remained a strong part of the state's economy until the mid 1900s.

== History ==
In July 1902, "John M. Warner, John Kimple, Louis Mitzell, Levi Starner, Chas. S. Duncan, Charles Emory and David M. Wolf" joined to start the Gettysburg Manufacturing Company. The company manufactured eight or more furniture styles (e.g., buffets, sideboards, hall racks and washstands mainly in oak). Following Levi Starner's 1902 death, the remaining owners purchased the company in December 1904.

By 1912, it had been renamed as the Gettysburg Furniture Company.

The "successor to the Warner Furniture company" was the Engle Furniture Company of Michel Engle. In April 1905, it began manufacturing dressers and later added chiffoniers, buffets, sideboards, and library tables using oak and mahogany. The Engle Furniture Company became the Reaser Furniture Company of Clayton S. Reaser in May 1907, producing more than forty styles in addition to hand-carved pieces.

In May 1917, the joint venture Stouck-Reaser Company filed documents for incorporation to buy, sell and deal in wholesale lumber products. In 1918, M. C. Jones was "elected manager of both the Reaser and Gettysburg furniture factories to succeed the late Clayton S. Reaser, and Henry Cordes was a local furniture designer.

Furniture production remained an important industry in Gettysburg through the 1920s. In 1920, the Gettysburg Panel Company formed to manufacture veneer panels for other firms. In 1923, the Gettysburg Chair Company was chartered to supply chairs that the local factories needed to complete their bedroom and dining room suites.

In 1923, the borough's production of furniture totaled almost 71,000 pieces. In 1927, there were 522 employees in the three plants: 261 in Gettysburg, 153 in Reaser, and 108 in Panel.

The furniture industry then declined in the mid-1900s. In November 1951, when the Stouck-Reaser company obtained a permit for a new office building, the other companies were sold to Sidney G. Rose of Cincinnati.

The Gettysburg Furniture Company factory closed in 1960, becoming a warehouse and distribution point for Rose's other furniture factories outside Pennsylvania.

A facility of the Dolly Madison Industries, Furniture Division, was located in Gettysburg in 1966.

== See also ==
- American Home Furnishings Alliance
