= Bahut =

Portable ornamented chest or coffer

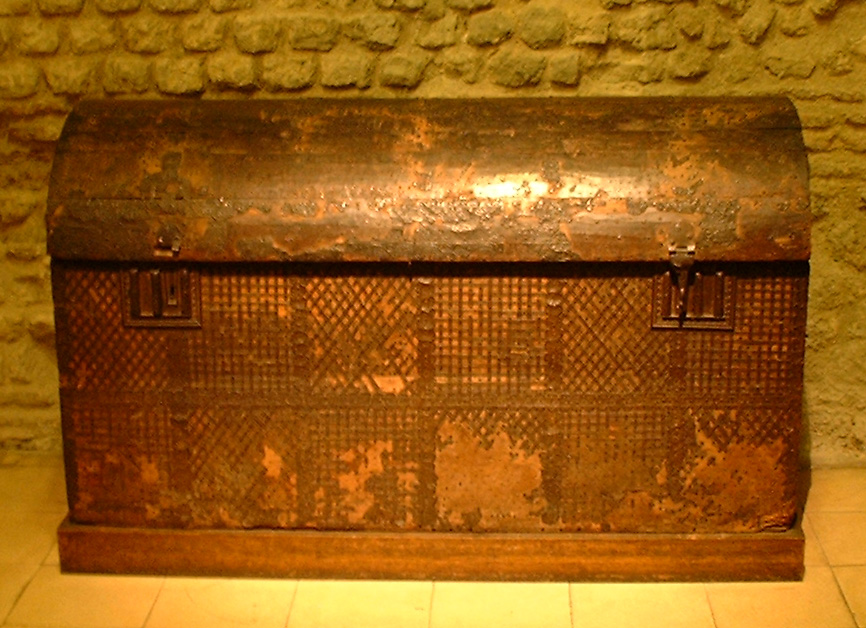
A 15th-century bahut, Musée de Cluny

A bahut is a portable chest, with a rounded lid covered in leather, garnished with nails, once used for the transport of clothes or other personal luggage, it was, in short, the original portmanteau. This ancient receptacle, of which mention is made as early as the 14th century—its traditional form is still preserved in many varieties of the travelling trunk—sometimes had its leather covering richly ornamented, and occasionally its interior was divided into compartments; but whatever the details of its construction it was always readily portable.

Towards the end of the 17th century the name fell into disuse, and was replaced by coffer, which probably accounts for its misuse by the French romantic writers of the early 19th century. They applied it to almost any antique sideboard, cupboard or wardrobe, and its use became hopelessly confused.

In architecture, this term is also used for a dwarf-wall of plain masonry, carrying the roof of a cathedral or church and masked or hidden behind the balustrade.

According to the Shorter Oxford Dictionary (3rd edition revised) "bahut" also means "a dress for masquerading".
