= Chifforobe =

Type of furniture

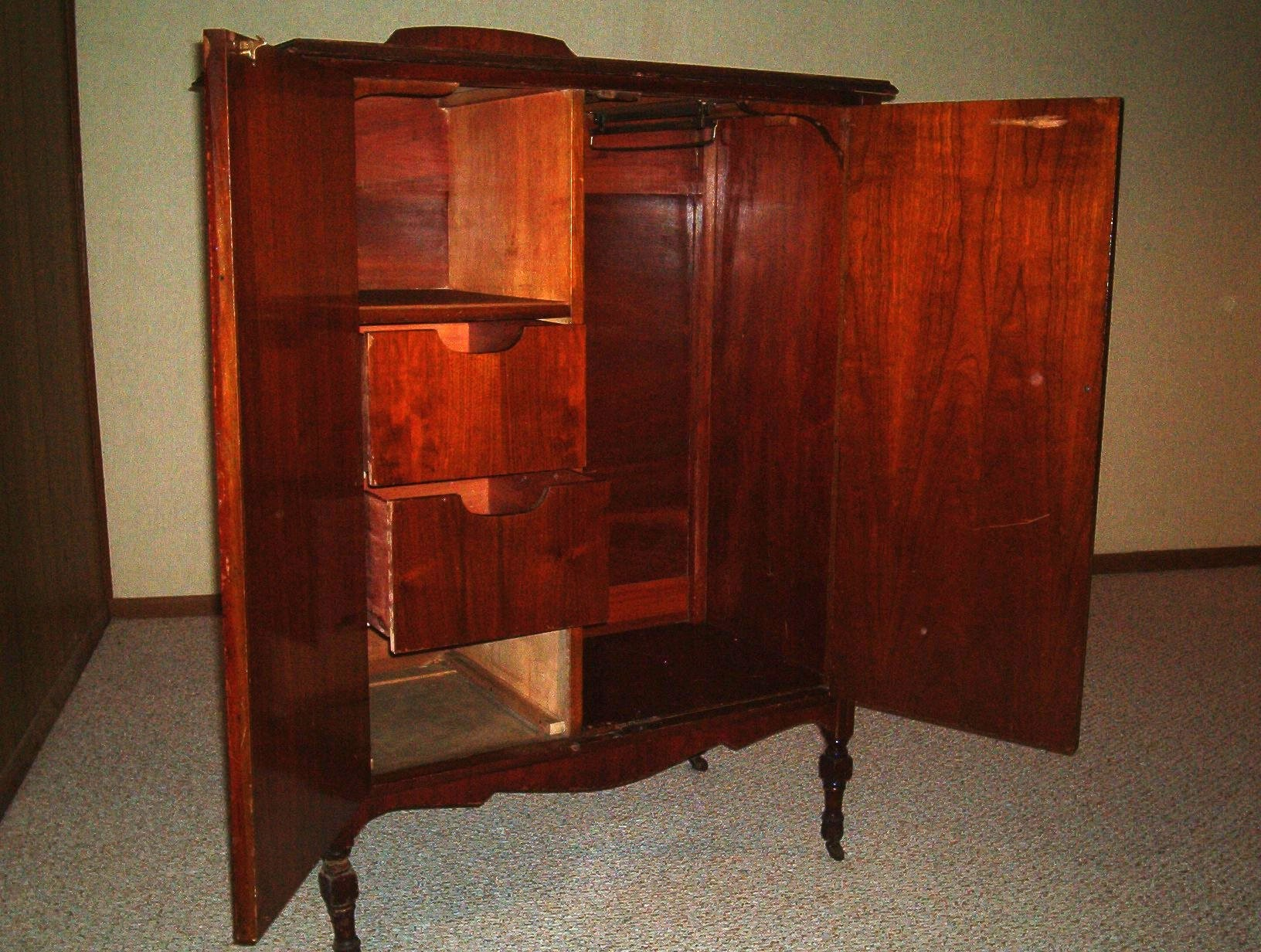
A chifforobe

A chifforobe (/ˈʃɪfəˌroʊb/), also chiffarobe or chifferobe, is a closet-like piece of furniture that combines a long space for hanging clothes (that is, a wardrobe or armoire) with a chest of drawers. Typically the wardrobe section runs down one side of the piece, while the drawers occupy the other side. It may have two enclosing doors or have the drawer fronts exposed and a separate door for the hanging space.

Chifforobes were first advertised in the 1908 Sears, Roebuck Catalogue, which described them as "a modern invention, having been in use only a short time." The term itself is a portmanteau of the words chiffonier and wardrobe.

The word is used in the United States, primarily in the southern portion of the country, in Puerto Rico, and in Cuba. Its use has been attested as far apart as Georgia and Vermont. In those references, it was used as a water closet or potty (or more accurately a commode). The word has been used in Texas, but is not as common as its synonyms such as bureau or dresser.

== In media ==
- In the 1952 Flannery O'Connor novel Wise Blood, Hazel Motes leaves a note on his mother's abandoned "chifforobe" warning thieves will be found and killed.
- In the song "Whistlin' Past The Graveyard", Tom Waits writes, "I come in on a night train, With an arm full of box cars, On the wings of a magpie, Cross a hooligan night, And I busted up a chifforobe, way out by the Kokomo, Cooked up a mess a mulligan And got into a fight."
- "Chiffarobe" appears eleven times in the 1960 Harper Lee novel To Kill a Mockingbird. For instance, Tom Robinson "busts up a chiffarobe" for Mayella Ewell. In the 2007 30 Rock episode “Rosemary’s Baby”, Jack Donaghy parodies To Kill a Mockingbird while impersonating Tracy Jordan’s father during a therapy session, referring to being paid a nickel to break up a chifforobe.
- In the 1982 Alice Walker novel The Color Purple, the character Celie describes that patting Harpo feels "like patting another piece of wood. Not a living tree, but a table, a chifferobe." Later in the book, Celie is not happy about the way she looks, and in that context she contemplates: "Nothing but churchgoing clothes in my chifferobe."
- In the 1988 Thomas Harris novel Silence of the Lambs, chapter twelve, Clarice Starling analyzes the police deputies at a funeral home in West Virginia and knows that "they came from houses that had chifforobes instead of closets and she knew pretty much what was in the chifforobes. She knew that these men had relatives who hung their clothes in suitbags on the walls of their trailers."
- Judith Ortiz Cofer recalled a "monstrous chifforobe" from her youth in Puerto Rico.
- Dorothy Allison uses the term repeatedly in her 1992 novel Bastard Out of Carolina.
- The 1999 King of the Hill episode "A Beer Can Named Desire" depicts character Gilbert Fontaine De la Tour D'Haute Rive using the term chifforobe. However, the piece of furniture he uses is depicted as a wardrobe, as it lacks drawers.
- In the 2009 Family Guy episode "Brian's Got a Brand New Bag", after breaking up with him, Brian's 50-year-old girlfriend Rita tells him to leave her apartment key on various pieces of furniture using terms unfamiliar to him, including a davenport, a chesterfield, a divan, and a chifforobe. All but the chifforobe refer to different types of sofas/couches.
- Karin Slaughter's 2017 novel "The Good Daughter" makes reference to a chifforobe in the childhood home of the protagonist.
