= Low boy =

A lowboy is a type of dressing table or vanity with one or two rows of drawers.

Lowboy, low-boy, or low boy may also refer to:

- Lowboy (trailer), a semi-trailer with two drops in deck height
- Lowboy, a 2008 novel by American writer John Wray
- Low-boy, a type of hi-hat arrangement (two cymbals and a foot pedal)
- Low Boy, a 1953 Studebaker Champion
- Lowboy, a Featherbed motorcycle frame
