= High chest of drawers (Indianapolis Museum of Art) =

Philadelphia Chippendale high chest of drawers
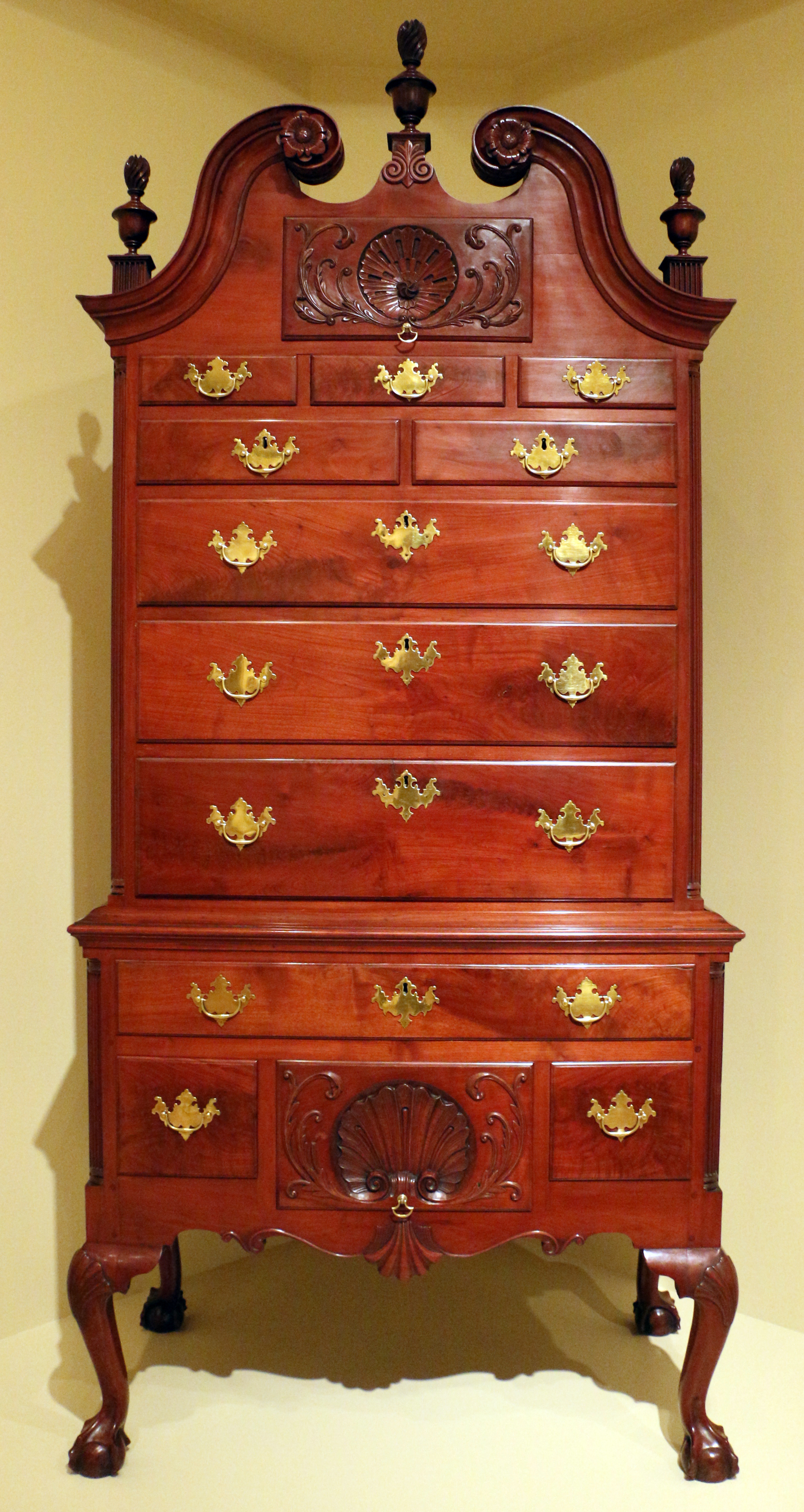
- Year: c. 1760–1780
- Type: Decorative art
- Dimensions: 250 cm × 109.9 cm × 56.5 cm (98 in × 43.25 in × 22.25 in)
- Location: Indianapolis Museum of Art; Indianapolis

This high chest of drawers, also known as a highboy or tallboy, is part of the Decorative Arts collection of the Indianapolis Museum of Art in Indianapolis, Indiana. Made between 1760 and 1780 in Philadelphia, Pennsylvania, its design was inspired by British furniture-maker Thomas Chippendale.

== Description ==
Chippendale's rococo style is readily visible in this high chest, with its scroll pediment, flame finials, and shell motifs on the drawers. It is carved from Virginia walnut, with brass mounts. An unusual feature is the unbroken top row of narrow drawers, with the elaborate shell-carved drawer above, rather than centered in the row. This is a more constrained and conservative stylistic choice than many other high chests, hinting at an earlier dating within the period.

== Historical information ==
In 1754, Chippendale published his hugely influential book of furniture patterns, The Gentleman and Cabinet-Maker's Director. While quite popular on both sides of the Atlantic, the tensions in the years around the Revolutionary War forced Americans to buy locally. Philadelphia was the largest city in the colonies, and growing rapidly larger thanks to a population boom. Thus, its furniture makers were kept busy crafting pieces such as this, adapting the Chippendale styles demanded by cosmopolitan customers to American tastes and materials. High chests were particularly popular items, used to store clothing and table linens.

=== Acquisition ===
The high chest of drawers was a gift of the National Society of the Colonial Dames of America in the State of Indiana to the IMA in 1975. It has the accession number 75.99 and is currently on view in the William L. Fortune Gallery.
