= Hope chest =

Box to collect items for married life

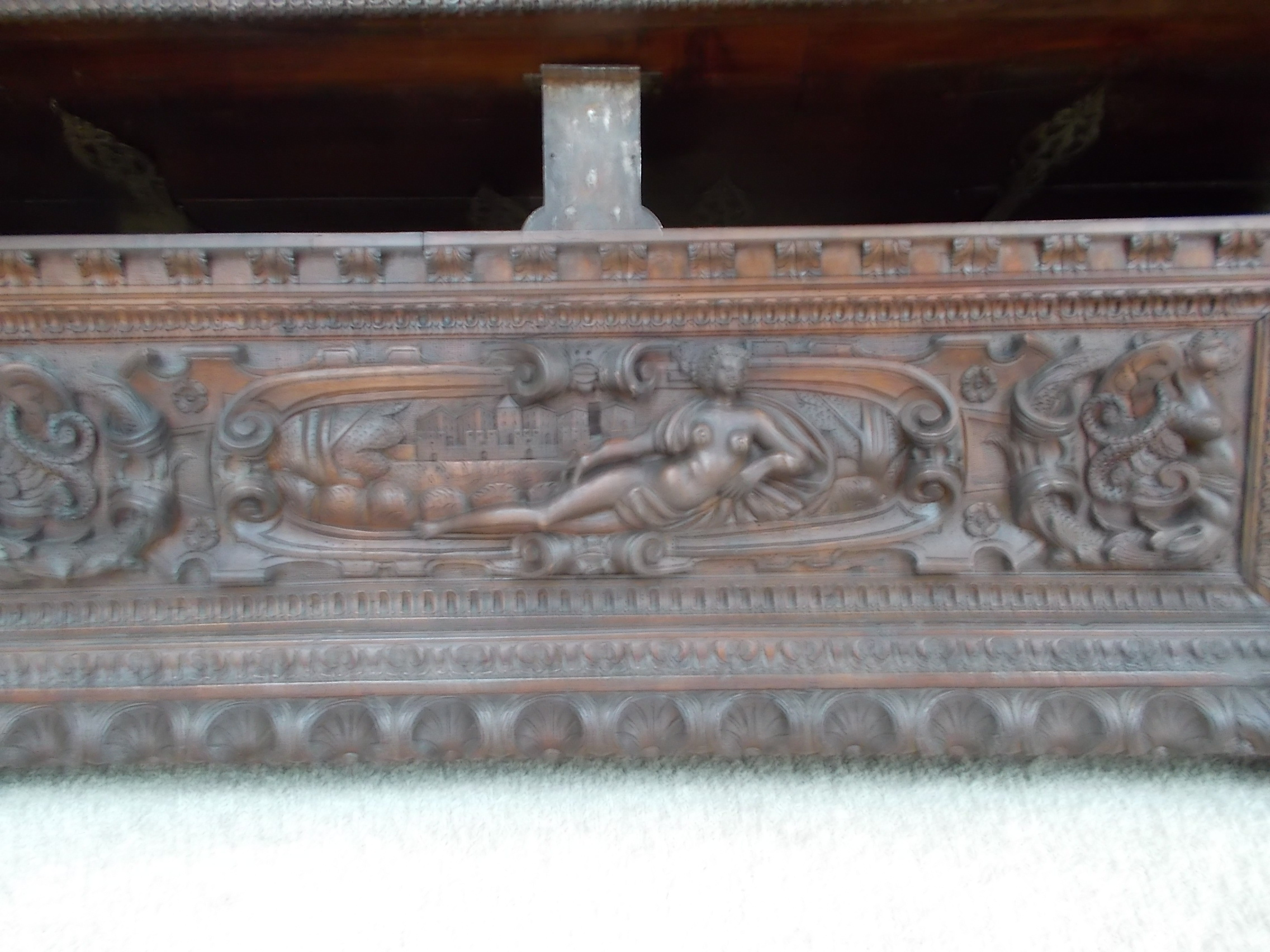
Intricate designs; typically the most decorated in the home during the prime time of the hope chest.

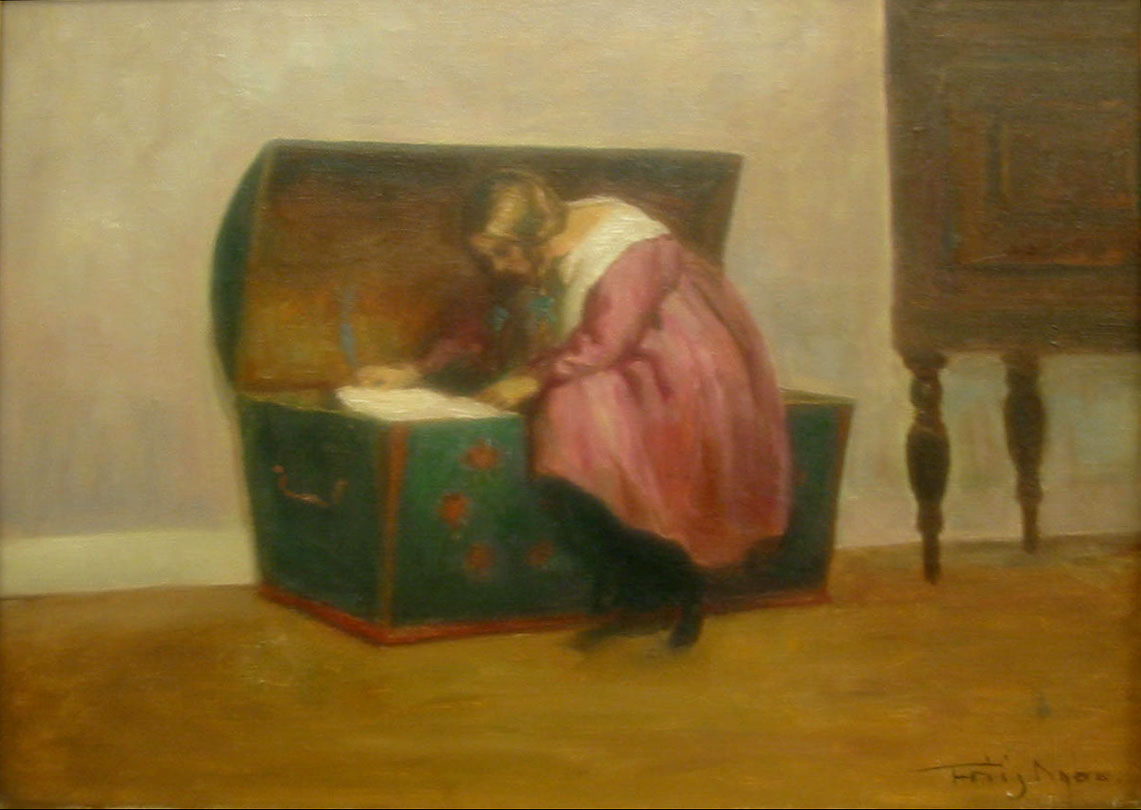
Girl inspecting her hope chest, by Poul Friis Nybo, c. 1900

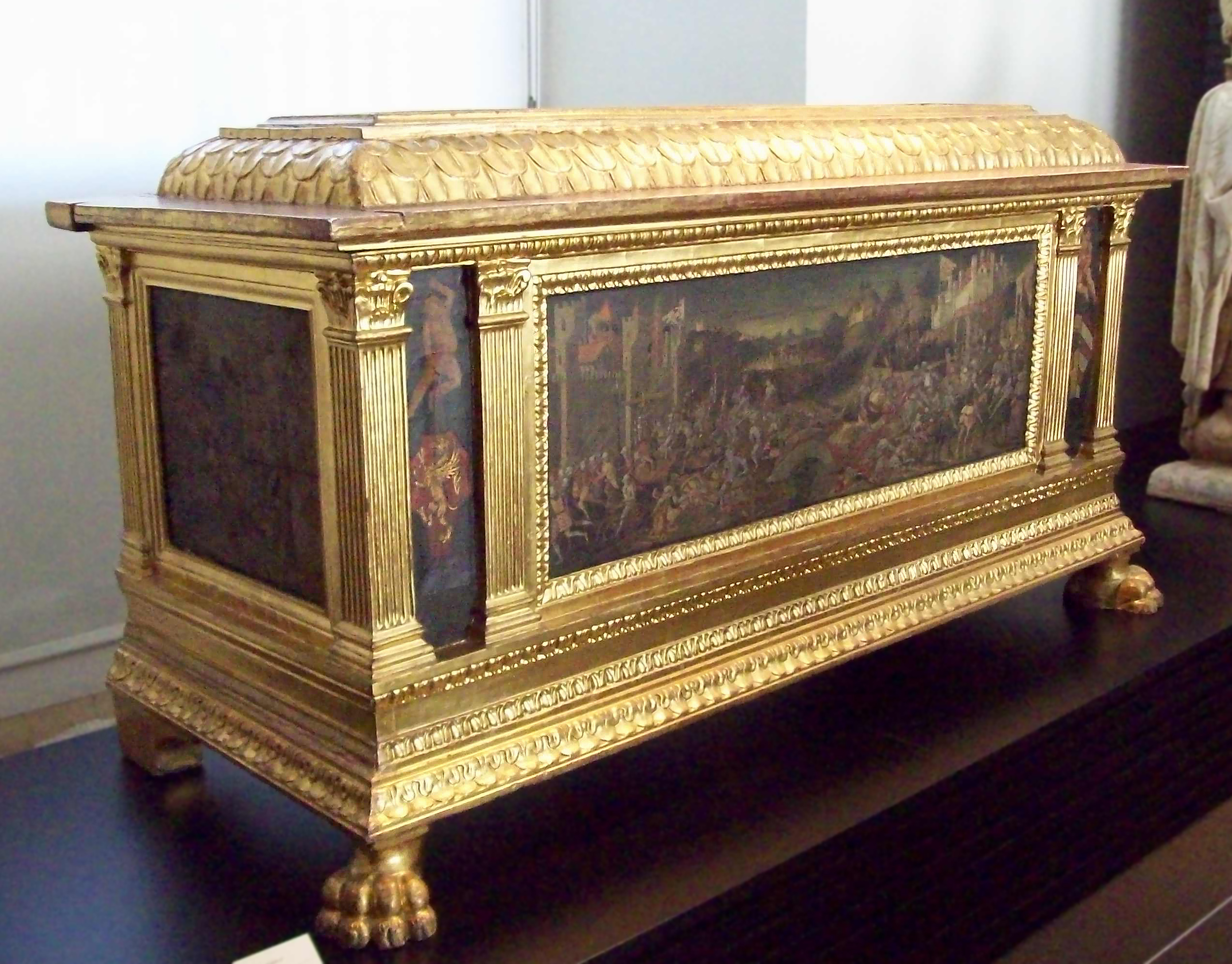
Renaissance hope chest (cassone) from Florence (15th century)

A hope chest, also called dowry chest, cedar chest, trousseau chest, or glory box, is a piece of furniture once commonly used by unmarried young women to collect items, such as clothing and household linen, in anticipation of married life.

The term 'hope chest' or 'cedar chest' is used in the United States; in the United Kingdom, the term is 'bottom drawer'; while both terms and 'glory box' are used by women in Australia. Today, some furniture makers refer to hope chests as chests made to hold family heirlooms or general storage items.

By contrast, a bridal chest was given to a bride at her wedding by her husband, and so is not a "hope chest" in this regard.

== Function ==
A trousseau was a common coming-of-age rite until approximately the 1950s; it was typically a step on the road to marriage between courting a man and engagement. It wasn't always collected in a special chest, hence the alternative UK term bottom drawer, which refers to putting aside one drawer in a chest of drawers for collecting the trousseau undisturbed, but such a chest was an acceptable gift for a girl approaching a marriageable age.

Contents of a 'hope chest' or 'glory box' included common dowry items such as clothing, table linens, towels, bed linens, quilts and occasionally dishware. The hope chest was often used for the firstborn girl of a family. Instead of only containing sheets and household linen in the bottom drawer, their chest would transport these goods and dowries, and later be used as a standard piece of furniture for the lady of the house to use. This dowry chest was often richly decorated, however over time dowry chests gradually became smaller, with jewelry boxes emerging instead of large dowry boxes.

Since brides often leave home upon marriage, some hope chests were made with portability in mind. The National Museum of Australia displayed a prospective bride's trousseau that was hand-made between 1916 and 1918. In this case, the trousseau— never used because the bride's fiancé was killed in World War I before the marriage took place — was stored in calico bags rather than in a chest.

== Historical origins ==
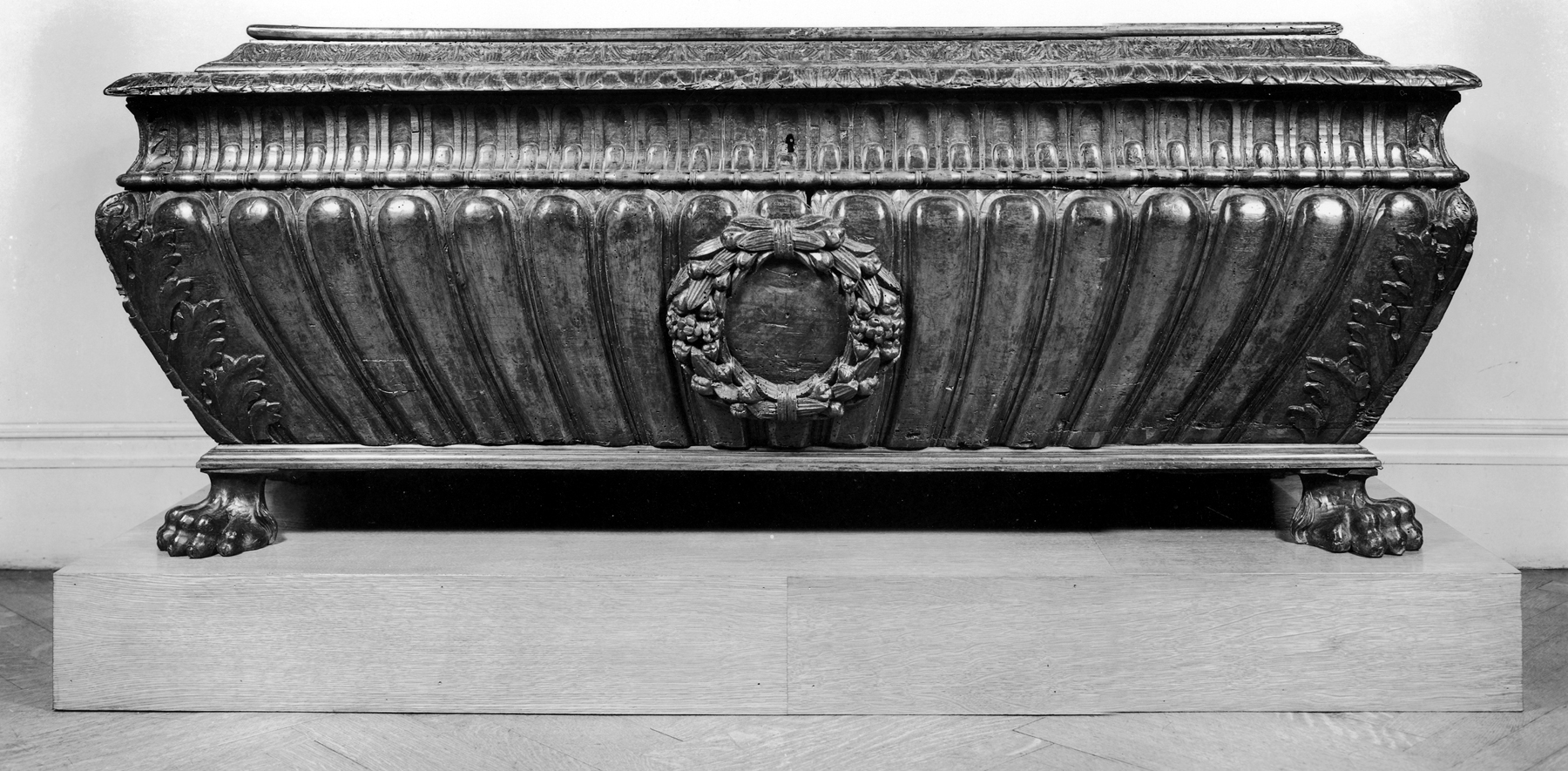
Italian – "Cassone" – Walters 6535

- Cassone of renaissance Italy

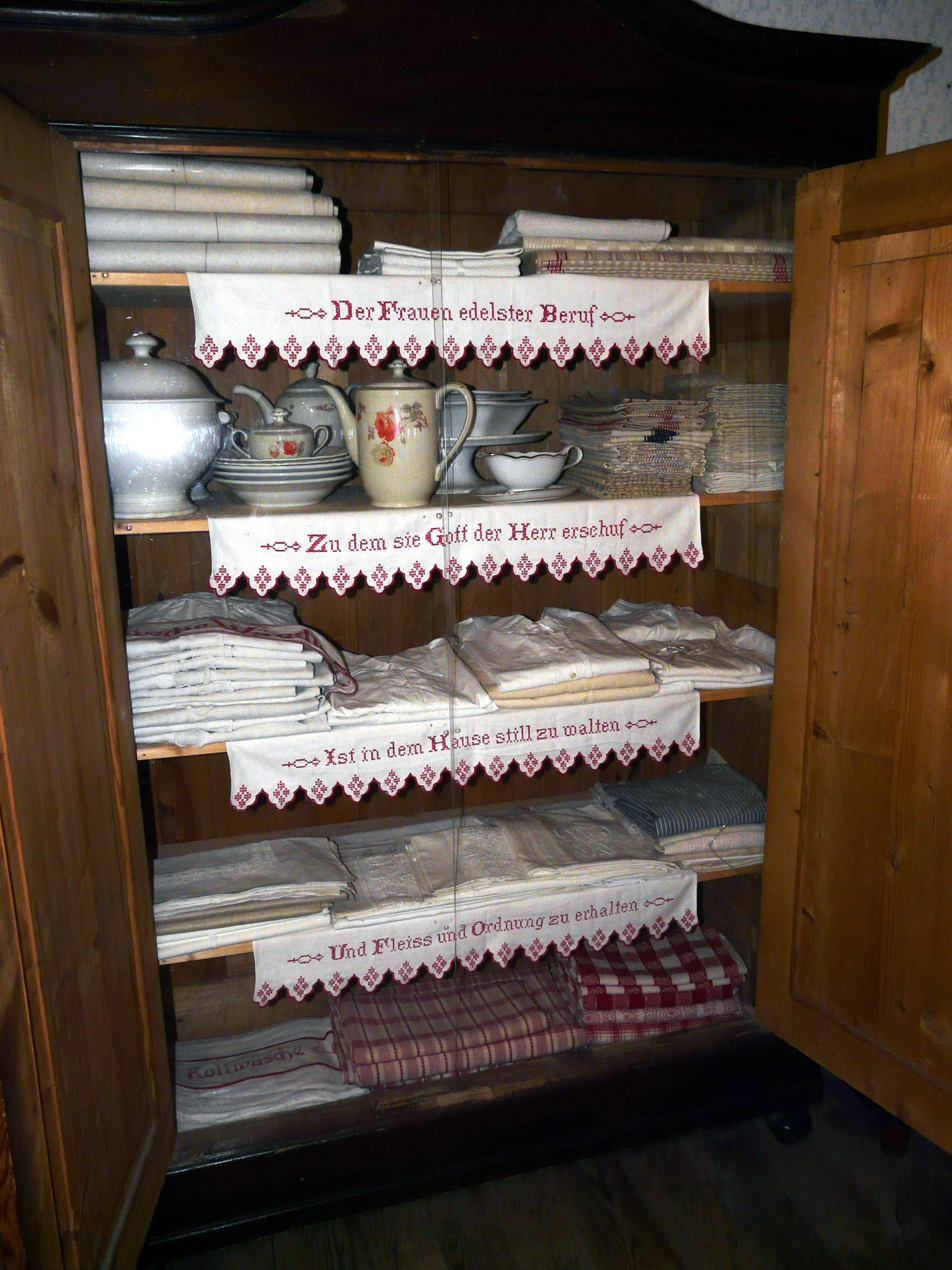
Aussteuerschrank – a dowry closet, currently in a German museum.

A large, Italian type of chest that was used in dynastic marriages in 15th and 16th century Italy. The cassone was associated with displays of wealth and luxury, serving as a prized possession among wealthy merchants and aristocrats.

- Dutch Kast or German Schrank

Kasts and schranks were tall, wardrobe-like chests with double doors, and larger than most hope chests. They were intended for regular service in the home after marriage and constructed with the ability to be dismantled for transport.

- American settlers

The hope chest as an expression of folk art came with the waves of European immigrants to America. Immigrants from Scandinavia settled in the Northern Midwest, while Germans arrived in Pennsylvania. The Amish had traditions of constructing simple chests with extensive painted decoration.

- Arabic origins

In the Middle East, similar chests were known as "dower chests." The Cairo Genizah documents, which contain nearly 400,000 texts, provide insight into daily life in Egypt from the 6th to the 19th centuries. Numerous marriage contracts from the Genizah refer to dower chests, with two types used: muqaddimah, for the bride’s personal possessions, and sunduq, commonly in matching pairs for other goods. These chests were generally not elaborately decorated, except in the case of the ruling class.

== Decoration ==
While not an essential to the function of a hope chest, different forms of decoration have historically appeared in many styles.

=== Carving ===
Carving was a notable technique in joined oak chests during the 17th and 18th century. The Hadley chests of Massachusetts were covered by surface carvings in the typical low-relief style of the period.

=== Engraving ===
Engraving is another way of decorating hope chests or cedar chests. It is common to add engravings to personalize chests or make them unique, particularly within Amish communities.

=== Painting ===
Painting has traditionally been used in Scandinavian and German hope chests, and follows traditional styles. Modern Arab hope chests are made of metal rather than wood, with closer resemblance to a footlocker. They are painted predominantly red, often with a mosque dome or architectural design on the lid.

=== Gesso ===
The gilded gesso of the cassoni was produced by craftsmen, although it is not as common now. It was often inlaid or carved, prepared with gesso ground then painted and gilded.

=== Sulfur inlay ===
Sulfur inlay was a decorative technique used in making furniture and chests during a short period of time. Between 1765 and 1820, German immigrant cabinetmakers in Lancaster County, Pennsylvania, used it to decorate the surface of chests. An example is the Deitrich chest of 1783, which is now at the Smithsonian.

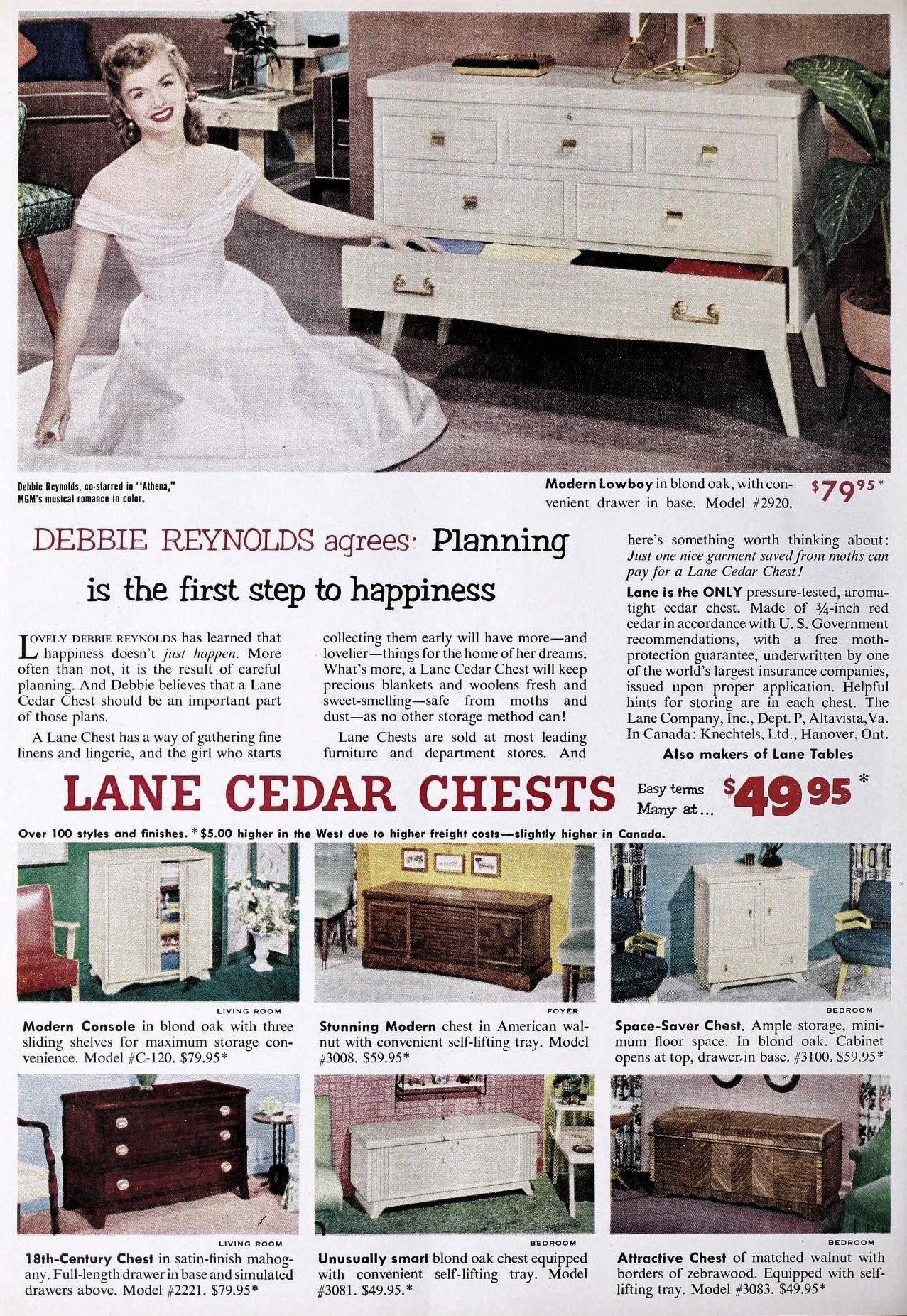
1954 advertisement with Debbie Reynolds

== Lane Furniture ==
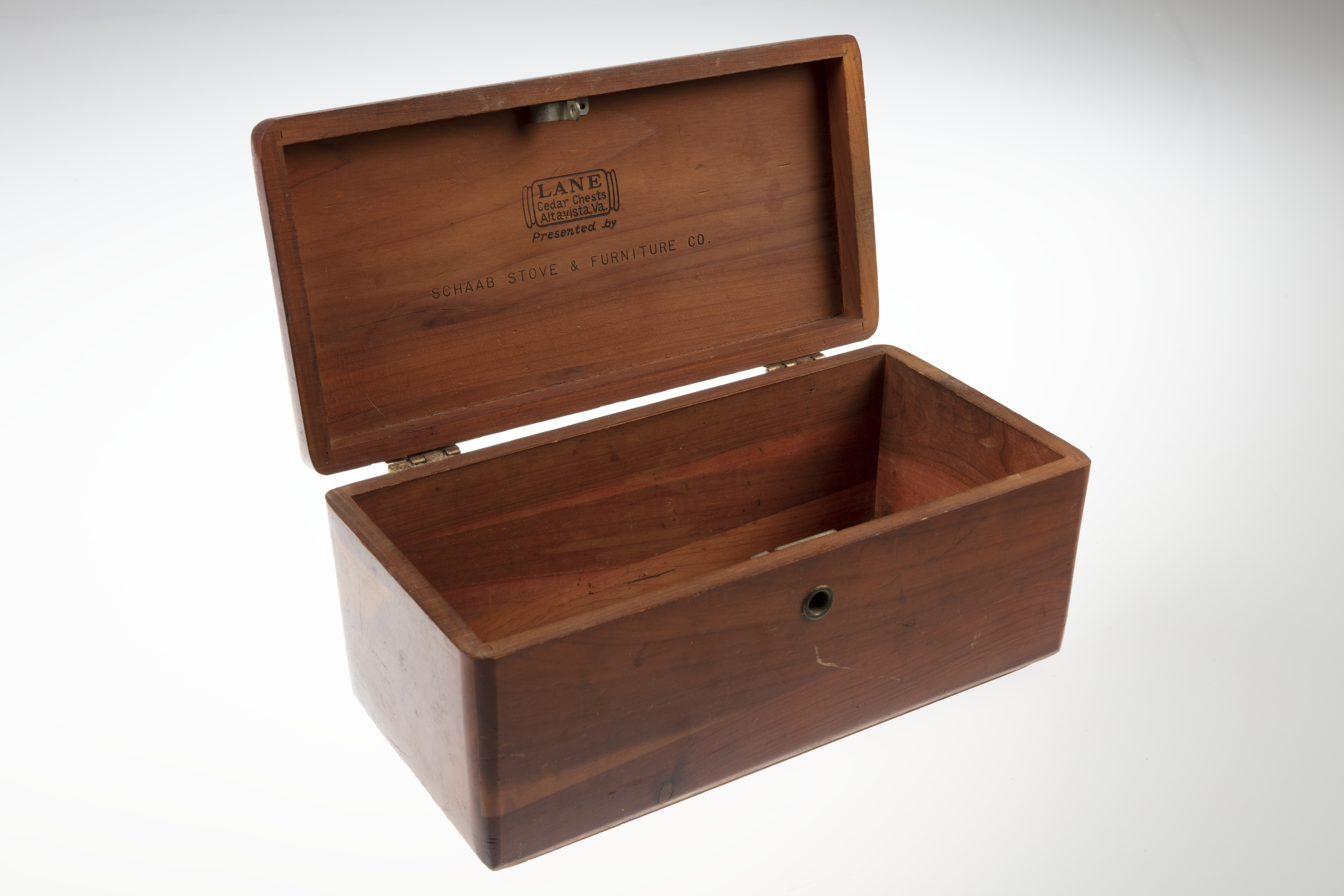
Lane Girl Graduate Plan Chest

The Lane Furniture Company of Altavista, Virginia (active 1912–2022) was a notable maker of cedar chests. After developing production-line techniques for ammunition boxes during World War I, they turned these techniques, and a patented locking-mitre corner joint, towards producing chests. They employed celebrity advertising, including a teenage Shirley Temple, in a campaign targeted at GIs and absentee sweethearts of World War II.

Lane Furniture was widely recognized for their Lane Girl Graduate Plan, a series of 1930s advertising gifts of 9" long cedar chests to girls graduating from high-school. While Lane Furniture company continued business after its acquisition by Interco Corporation in 1987, the production of Lane Cedar chests stopped in 2001.

== Suffocation hazard to children ==
There have been 14 reported cases of child suffocation inside hope chests due to the piece's traditional design, which can trap children under a heavy and sometimes self-locking lid. In 1996, following reports of at least six child suffocation deaths, the manufacturer Lane Furniture recalled 12 million self-locking hope chests which could not be opened from the inside. Specifically, the CPSC recall applied to the locks of all "Lane" and "Virginia Maid" cedar chests manufactured between 1912 and 1987. As part of the recall, they provided new latch replacement parts. However, CPSC estimates that 6 million chests still use the recalled lock latch. As of 2023 this recall is no longer available, and owners are encouraged to permanently remove the latch and lock.

== See also ==
- Bride price
- Dower
- Dowry
