= Frankfurt Cabinet =

Style of wardrobe

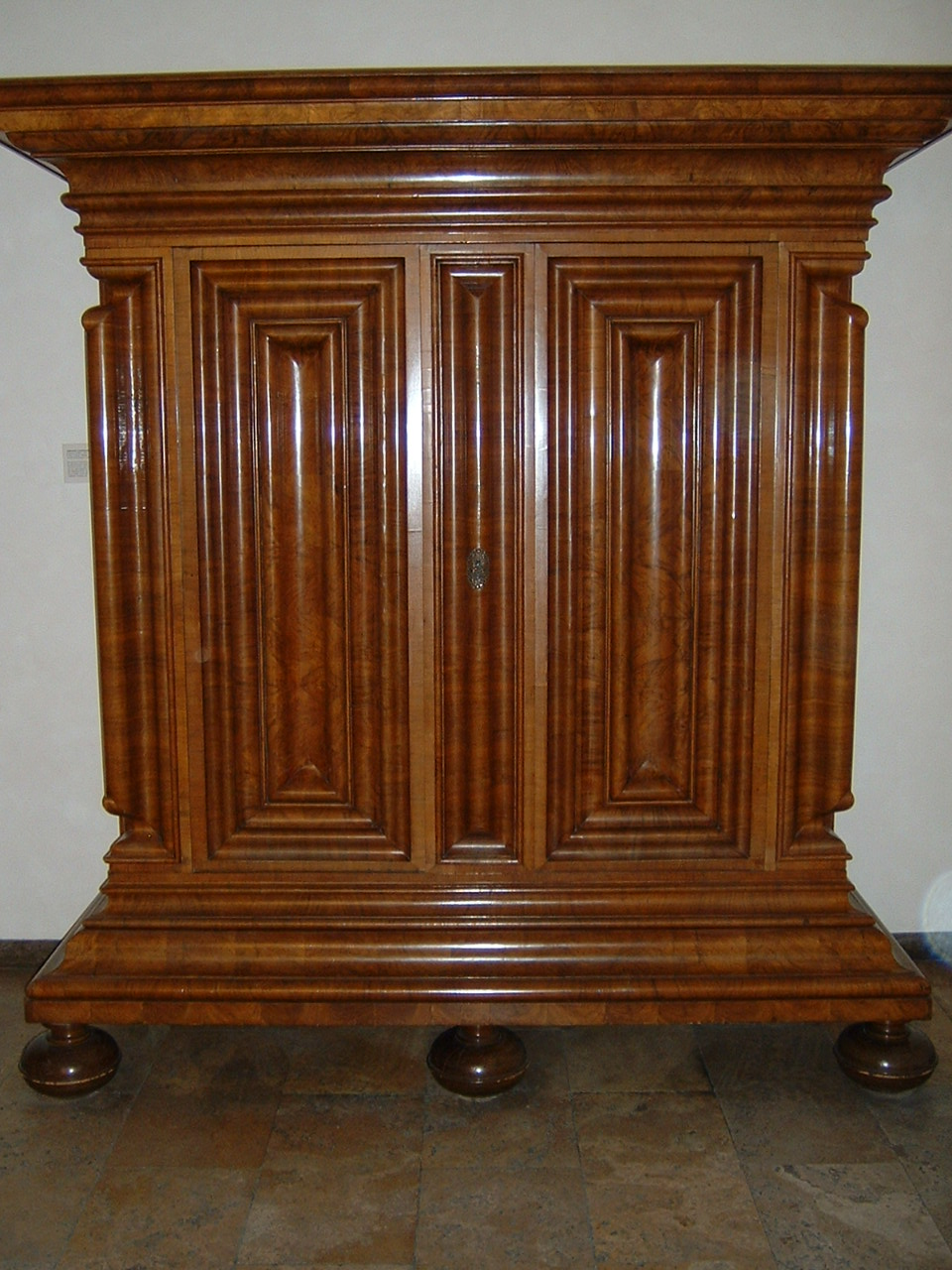
Frankfurt cabinet in the Römer

The Frankfurt cabinet (German: Frankfurter Schrank) is a two-door baroque style of wardrobe originating in the Rhine-Main region of Germany, with a distinct system of separable parts. Several variants exist denoted by a prefix added on to the German word for cabinet, Schrank, e.g. Wellenschrank (wave cabinet), Pilasterschrank (pilaster cabinet), Säulenschrank (column cabinet), stollenschrank (pillar cabinet) or Nasenschrank (nose cabinet).

They were traditionally made from spruce with a walnut veneer, through some exist in solid oak, though it is debated whether specimens in the latter category can be considered true Frankfurt cabinets. Un-veneered examples made from pine are generally modern reproductions. All wardrobes are—thanks to their construction—divisible into several individual parts with just a few simple moves and can be re-assembled again without tools, though requiring two people.

These wardrobes were required as journeyman pieces in the Frankfurt joinery trade, but could also be commissioned works of patrician families. Their original purpose was the storage of household linen and clothing, with the size intended to illustrate the linen supply of the owner family. The later-added clothes rail, present in many surviving examples, was installed in the 19th century with the advent of the coat hanger.

The furniture stood in the hallway or entrance hall and increasingly gained the importance of a piece of representation. Publicly accessible examples can be found in the Bolongaro Palace, the Goethe House, and the Römer. Historically, some wardrobes have been and are still used as filing cabinets — for example in banks or in the offices of the Frankfurt City Hall.

== Construction ==
Characteristic of the Frankfurt Cabinet is its structural division, which borrows design elements from architecture. Two main types are distinguished: the pilaster wardrobes and the cusped (inverted) wardrobes. The former feature three pilasters—two positioned at the corners and one in the center. The horizontal division is defined by a straight base and a projecting cornice at the top.

In the cusped wardrobes, the side walls and the front consist of several deep, partly undercut cusps. Over time, the design became increasingly abstract: early examples resemble column wardrobes, while later ones take on wave or “nose” forms.

The wardrobes are typically made of softwood veneered with walnut; especially fine examples are further embellished with inlays—figures or scrollwork crafted from precious woods, ivory, or silver. Solid oak wardrobes also exist. Unveneered pieces made entirely of fir or oak are considered contemporaneous reproductions rather than journeyman works.

A notable variant of the Frankfurt cabinet is the wave wardrobe, named for its richly walnut cross-veneered, wave-shaped profile moldings that decorate both the front and sides. The so-called nose wardrobe adds similarly cross-veneered, nose-shaped projecting pilasters and a matching door stop bead.

The joints of the individual components are simple: the framed back panel is merely slotted in, the cornice and base sections are connected with wedges, and the doors are simply hung. This construction makes the wardrobe exceptionally durable, so much so that many Frankfurt cabinets remain preserved today in private collections.

Earlier restorations often introduced serious errors: the flexible joints were sometimes removed and replaced with glue. This rigid bonding prevented the wood from “working,” making transport possible only as a single unit. It was soon recognized, however, that the Frankfurt wardrobe owed its durability precisely to the flexibility of its construction.

== History ==
The first Frankfurt cabinets were built by the Frankfurt cabinet-maker Friedrich Unteutsch (circa 1600–1670). His book "Neues Zieratenbuch," which appeared about 1650, was of great use to joiners, carpenters or artists and sculptors. To complete a lavishly veneered and inlaid example, a single craftsman required up to a year. Wardrobes of this type were also built outside of Frankfurt, but most actually come from Frankfurt workshops.

In 1962 a Frankfurt cabinet was placed in the Goethe House, New York. In 2002 there was a restitution case in the Netherlands concerning a wardrobe from the legacy of the family F. B. E. Gutmann.

== Examples ==
Museum examples can be found, among others, in the Museum für Angewandte Kunst Frankfurt, the Museum für Angewandte Kunst Cologne (wave-wardrobe), the Historisches Museum Frankfurt and the Bachgaumuseum Großostheim (wave-wardrobe).

== Design legacy ==
The fine craftsmanship characteristic of the Frankfurt cabinet and baroque furniture in general would later be imitated in a style derisively dubbed "Gelsenkirchener Barock" (Gelsenkirchen baroque).

In 1985, the Frankfurt architectes Norbert Berghof, Michael Landes and Wolfgang Rang designed the "Frankfurter Hochhausschrank F1" as a contemporary interpretation of the Frankfurter Schrank.
