= Tallboy (furniture) =

Type of furniture with drawers

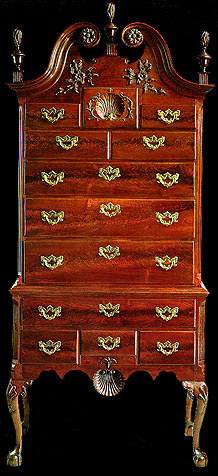
Philadelphia highboy with cabriole legs. A lowboy in the same style might likely consist of the lower two drawers.

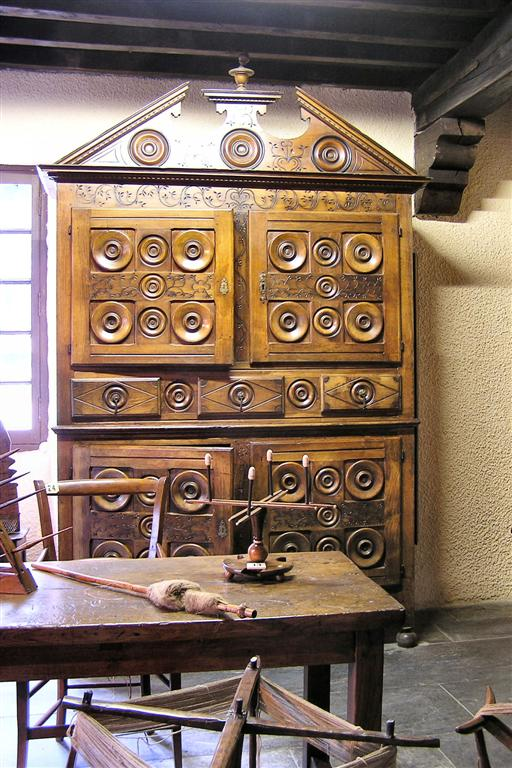
Intricately carved Oakley-style tallboy with under cabinet. Other varieties had drawers at the bottom and room for hanging clothes in the top cabinet.

A tallboy is a piece of furniture incorporating a chest of drawers and a wardrobe on top. A highboy consists of double chest of drawers (a chest-on-chest), with the lower section usually wider than the upper. A lowboy is a table-height set of drawers designed to hold a clothes chest, which had been the predominant place one stored clothes for many centuries.

== Details ==
Whereas the chest of drawers in its familiar form contains three long and two short drawers, the highboy has five, six, or seven long drawers, and two short ones. It is a very late 17th-century development of the smaller chest. The early examples are walnut, but by far the largest portion of the many that have survived are mahogany, this being the wood most frequently employed in the 18th century for the construction of furniture, especially the more massive pieces. Occasionally the walnut at the beginning of the vogue was inlaid, just as satinwood varieties were inlaid, depending for relief upon carved cornice-mouldings or gadrooning, and upon handsome brass handles and escutcheons.

The tallboy was the wardrobe of the 18th century, but it eventually gave place to the modern type of wardrobe, which, with its sliding doors, was speedily found to be not only as capacious as its predecessor but more convenient to access. The only way to reach the topmost drawers of the tallboy was by the use of bed steps, and the disappearance of high beds and the consequent disuse of steps exercised a certain influence in displacing a characteristic piece of furniture which was popular for at least a century.

== Philadelphia ==
In the mid-18th century, highboys in North America became very ornate. The most elaborate pieces came from Philadelphia. At that time it was one of the most important American cities, both before and after the American Revolution, and was a center of style and culture.

== See also ==
- Thomas Chippendale
- High chest of drawers (Indianapolis Museum of Art)
