= Wardrobe =

Standing closet used for storing clothes

A wardrobe, also called armoire or almirah, is a piece of standing furniture used for storing clothes. The term is also sometimes used for a closet. The earliest wardrobe was likely a chest, but the term wardrobe was first given to a room in which garments were stored, then to freestanding furniture with the same function, sometimes called a clothes-press. From these closets and cupboards the modern wardrobe, with its hanging spaces, sliding shelves and drawers, evolved gradually.

== Etymology ==
The word wardrobe appeared in the English language in the early 14th century. It originated from Old French words warderobe, wardereube and garderobe, in which "warder" meant "to keep, to guard" and "robe" meant "garment".

== History ==
In the United States, the wardrobe in its moveable form as a "hanging cupboard" dates back to the early 17th century. At that time wardrobes were an early export product from America to England, because English woodlands were over-harvested or reserved for the Navy. Many early American wardrobes were made of oak and consequently referred to as an Oakley. Later materials would include walnut, mahogany, pine, and other hard and soft woods.

During a large portion of the 18th century, the tallboy was a common layout for wardrobes. In the nineteenth century, the wardrobe began to develop into its modern form, with separate sections for hanging rods, shelves, and drawers. Modern wardrobes often include mirrors and presses or ironing boards. Custom wardrobes may be fitted to the size and shape of the room.

== Types of wardrobe ==
=== Kas style ===
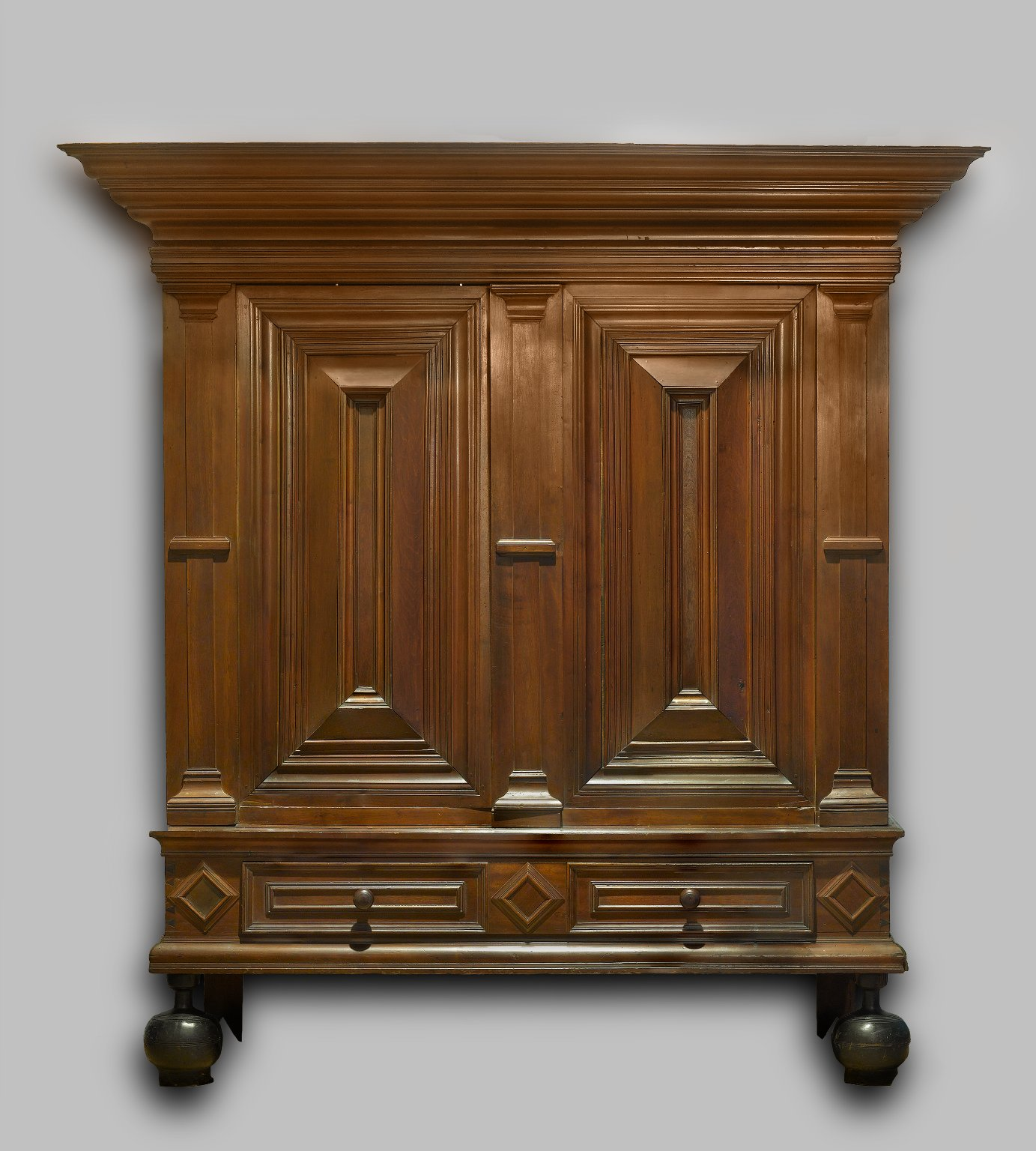
Kas, early 19th century, Brooklyn Museum (New York City)

Kas, kast, or kasten (pronounced kaz) is a massive cupboard or wardrobe of Dutch origin similar to an armoire that was popular in the Netherlands and America in the 17th & 18th centuries. It was fitted with shelves and drawers used to store linen, clothing, and other valuables and locked by key. They were status symbols and family heirlooms in the Low Countries and imported luxury goods to the American colonies. As such they were often made of quality wood such as cherry, rosewood and ebony that were panelled, carved or painted.

== Gallery ==
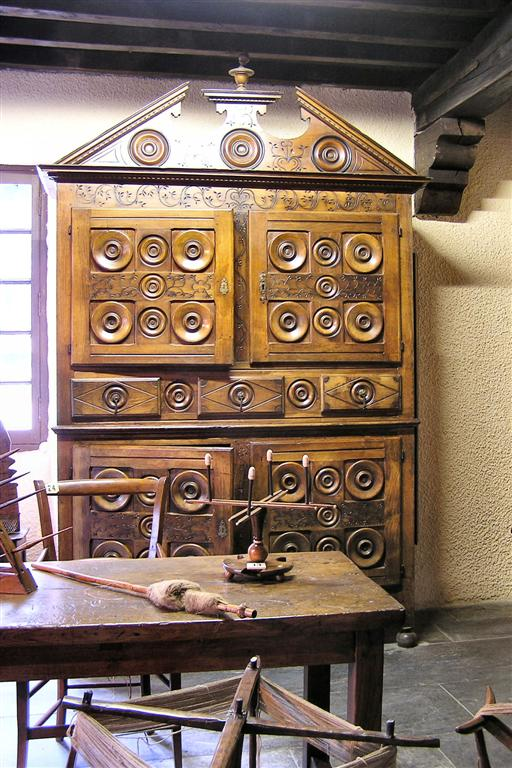
Intricately carved French Oakley style tallboy with under-cabinet instead of a chest of drawers

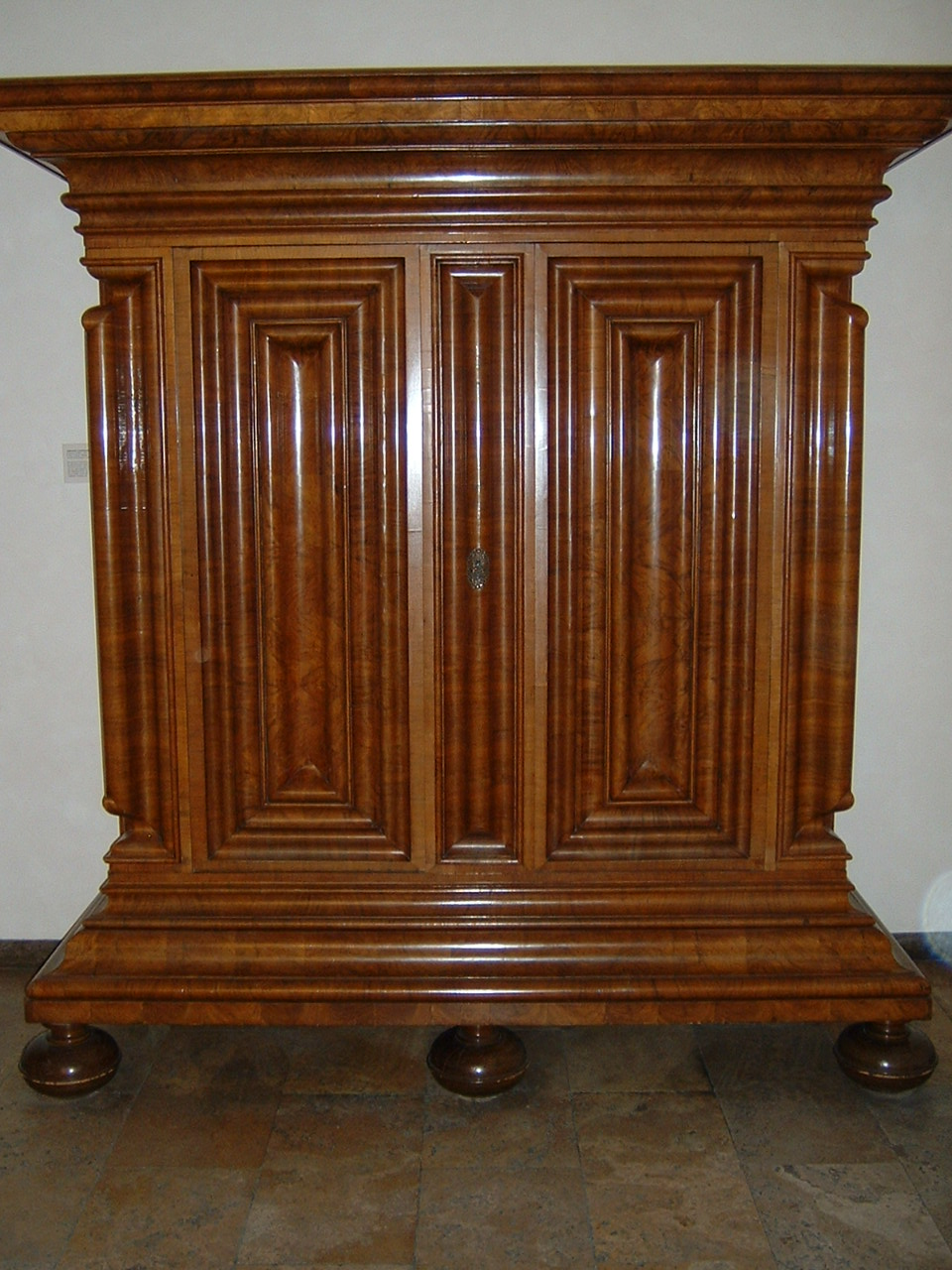
Frankfurt cabinet in the city hall of Frankfurt

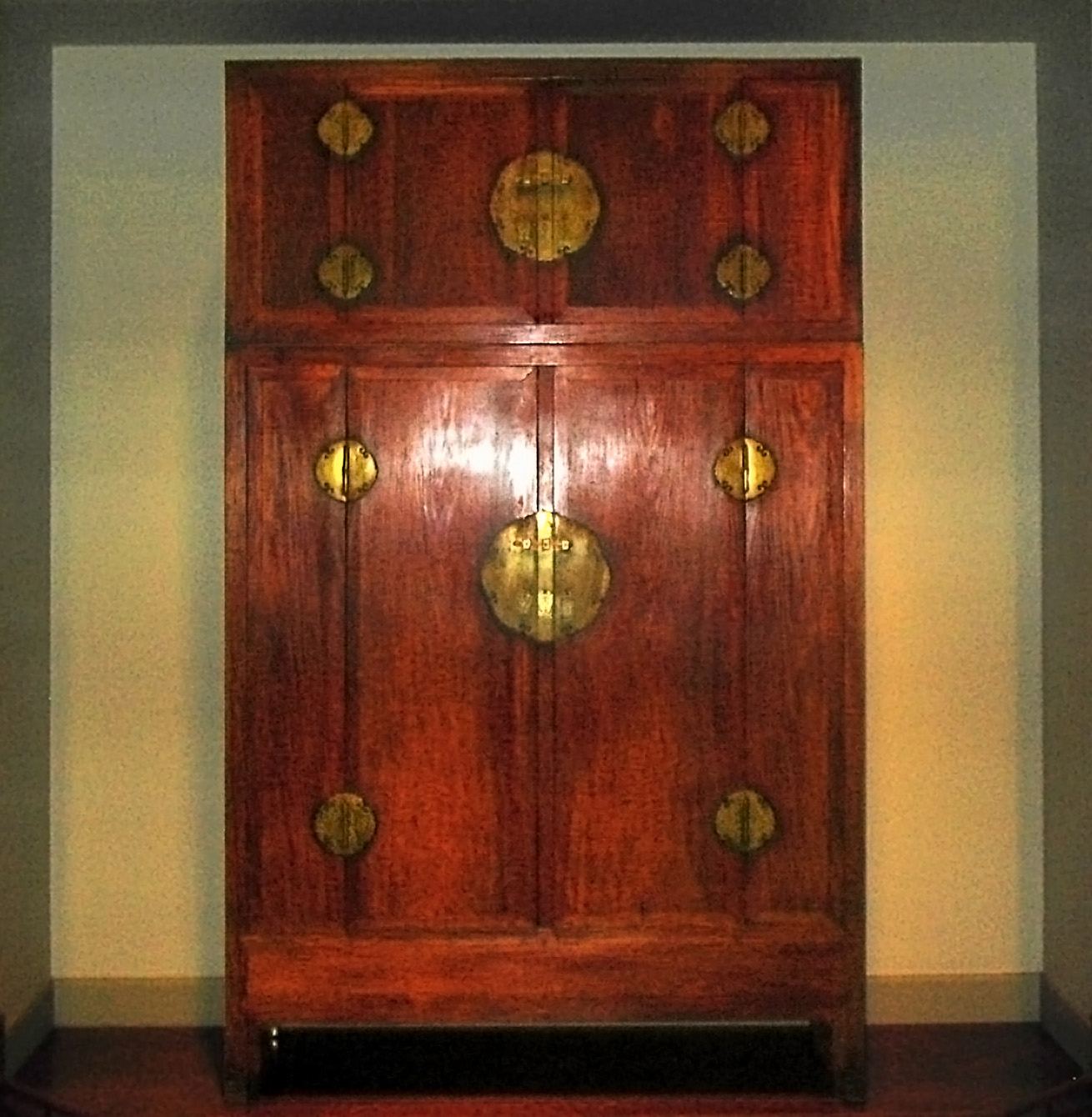
A Chinese Ming Dynasty compound wardrobe made of rosewood, latter half of the 16th century

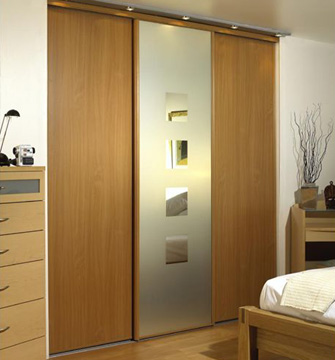
A modern fitted wardrobe

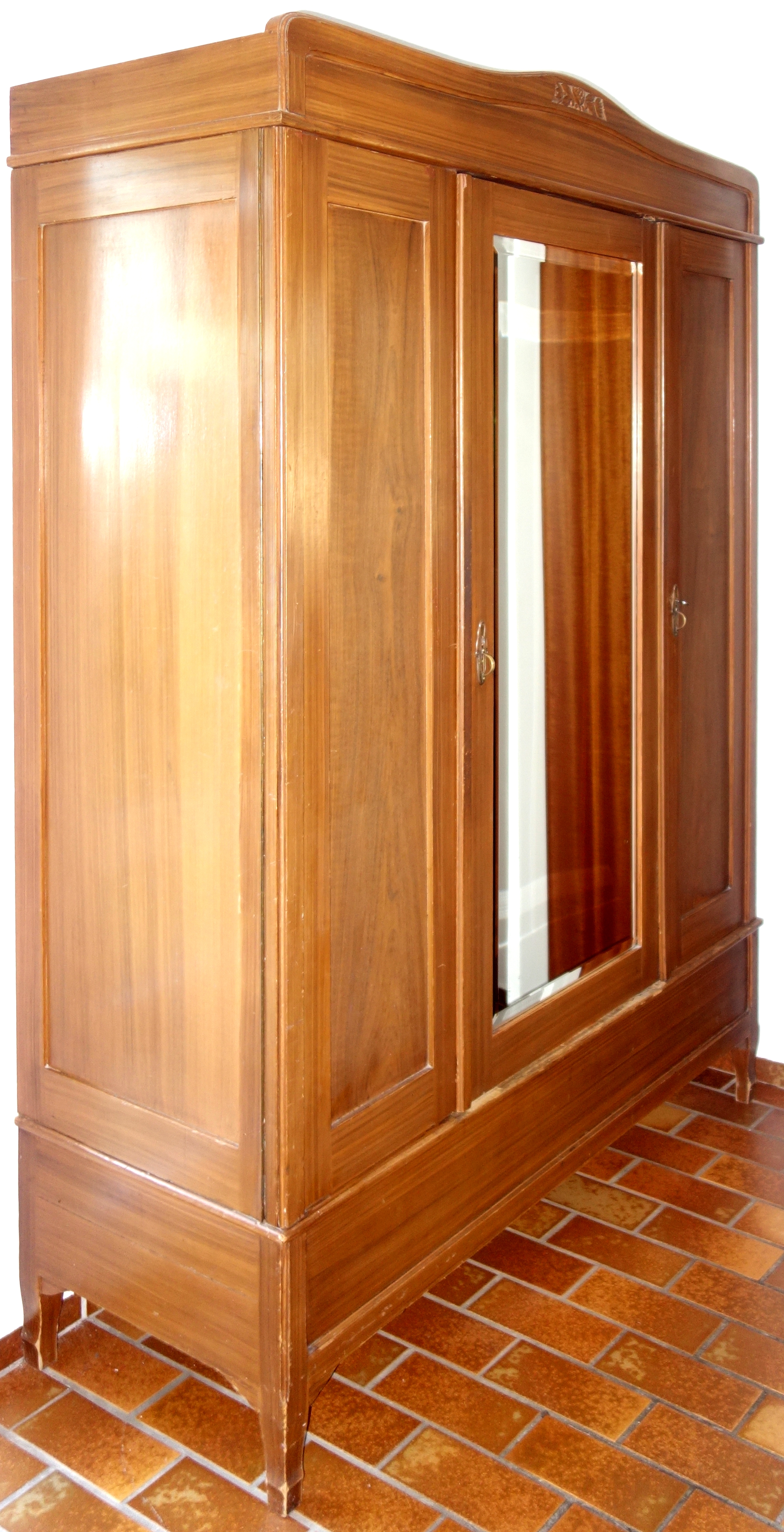
Mirror cabinet (Art Nouveau)

== See also ==
- Cabinetry
- Closet
- Encoignure
- Frankfurt Cabinet
- Hoosier cabinet
- Shoe rack
- Tansu (Japanese)
