= Chest (furniture) =

Type of furniture

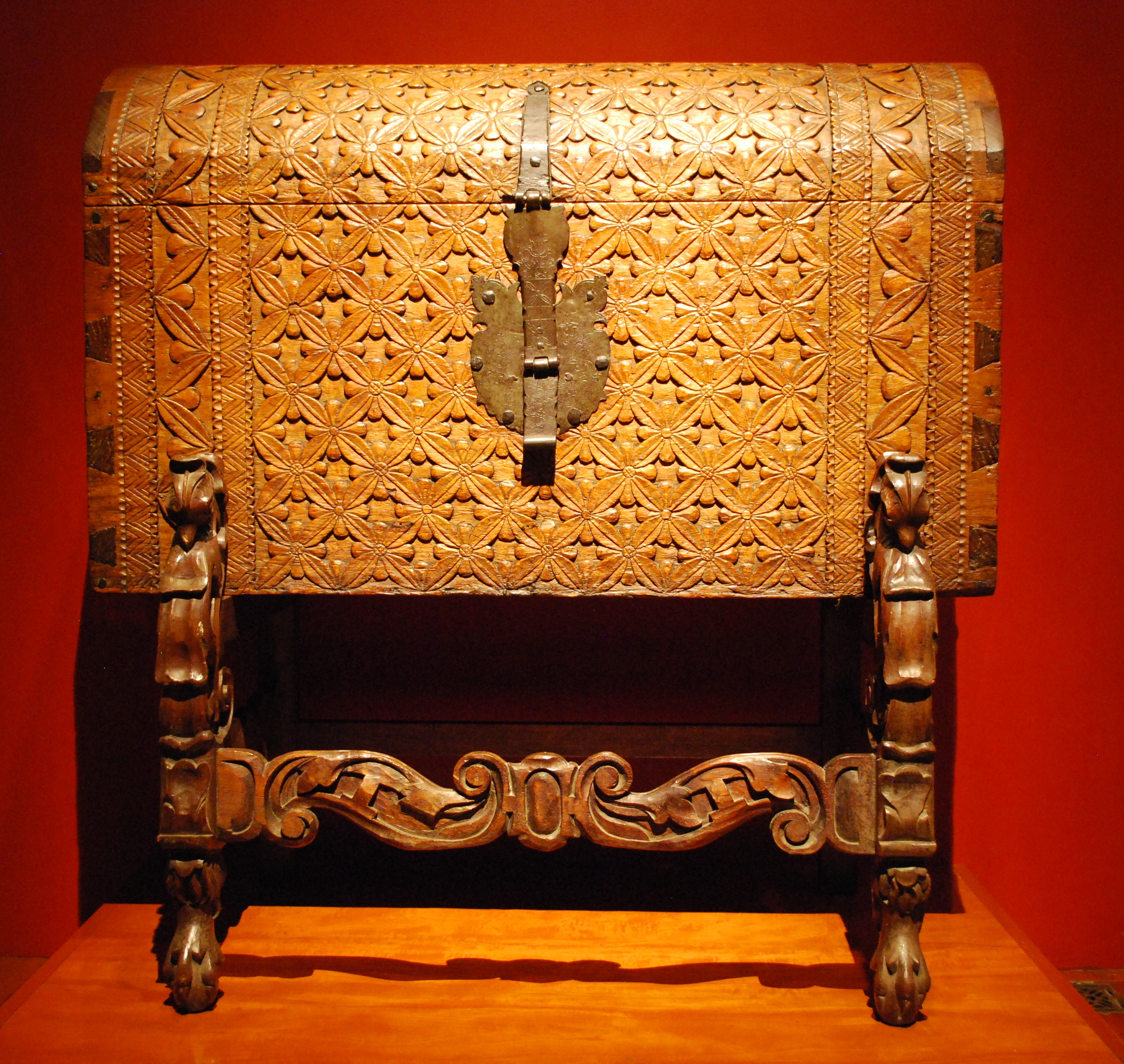
Mexican chest from the viceregal era, at the Franz Mayer Museum

A chest (also called a coffer or kist) is a type of furniture typically having a rectangular structure with four walls and a removable or hinged lid, often rounded. It is primarily used for storage, usually of personal items, articles of clothing, or in popular culture, treasure. The interior space may be subdivided into compartments or sections to organize its contents more effectively.

== History ==
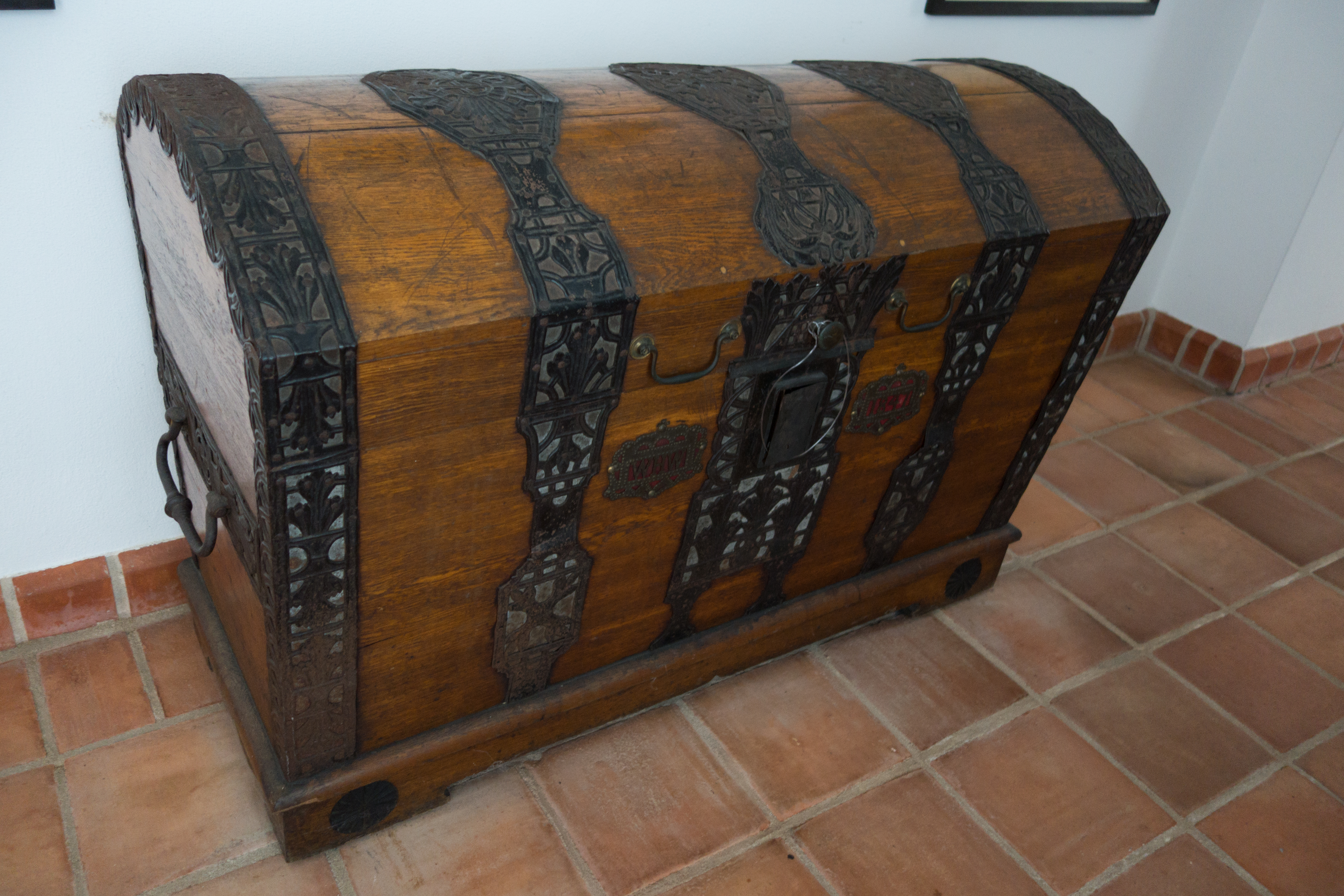
German chest with metal band and locking mechanism, c. 1847

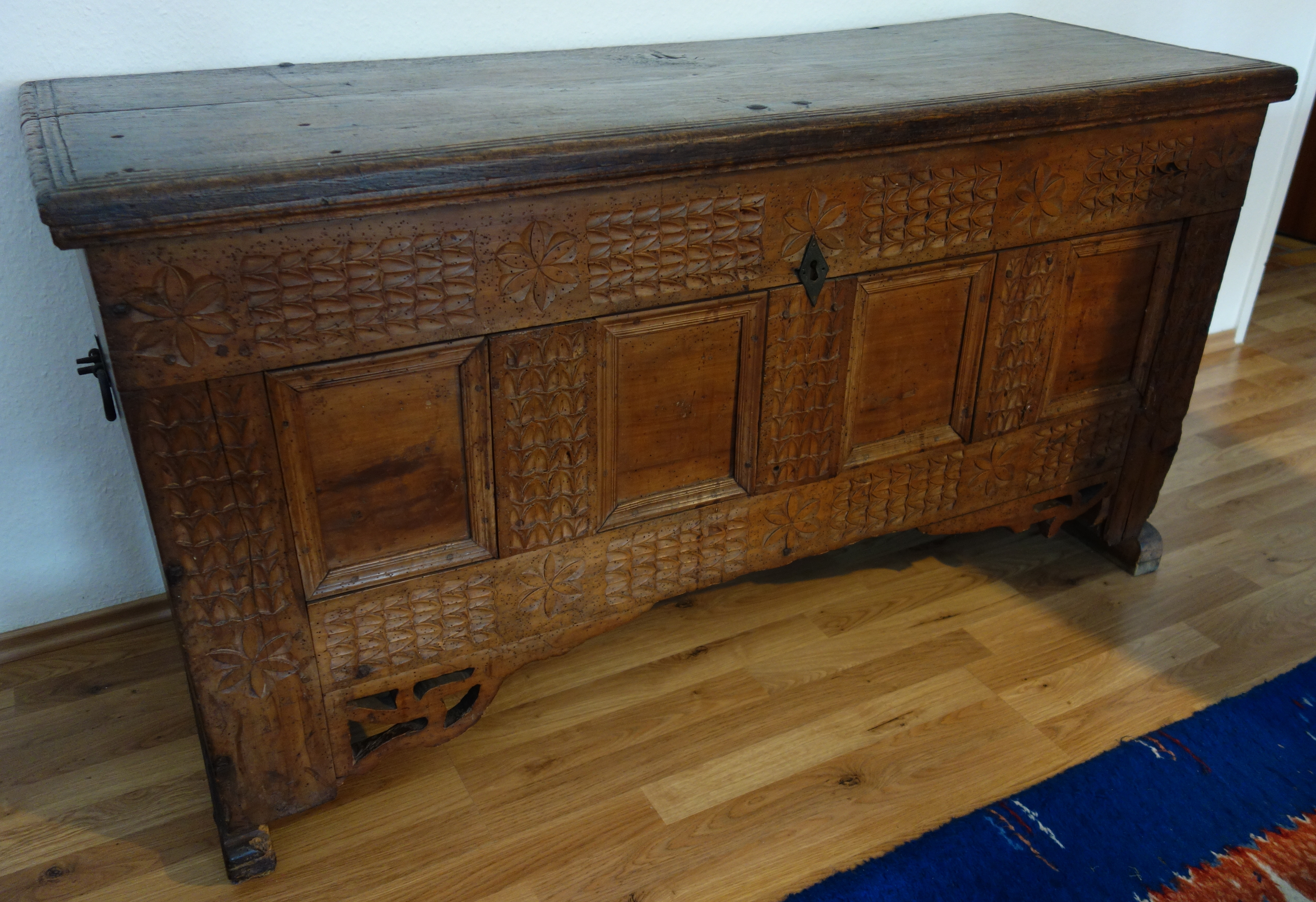
Renaissance chest with carved base and floral carvings (private property)

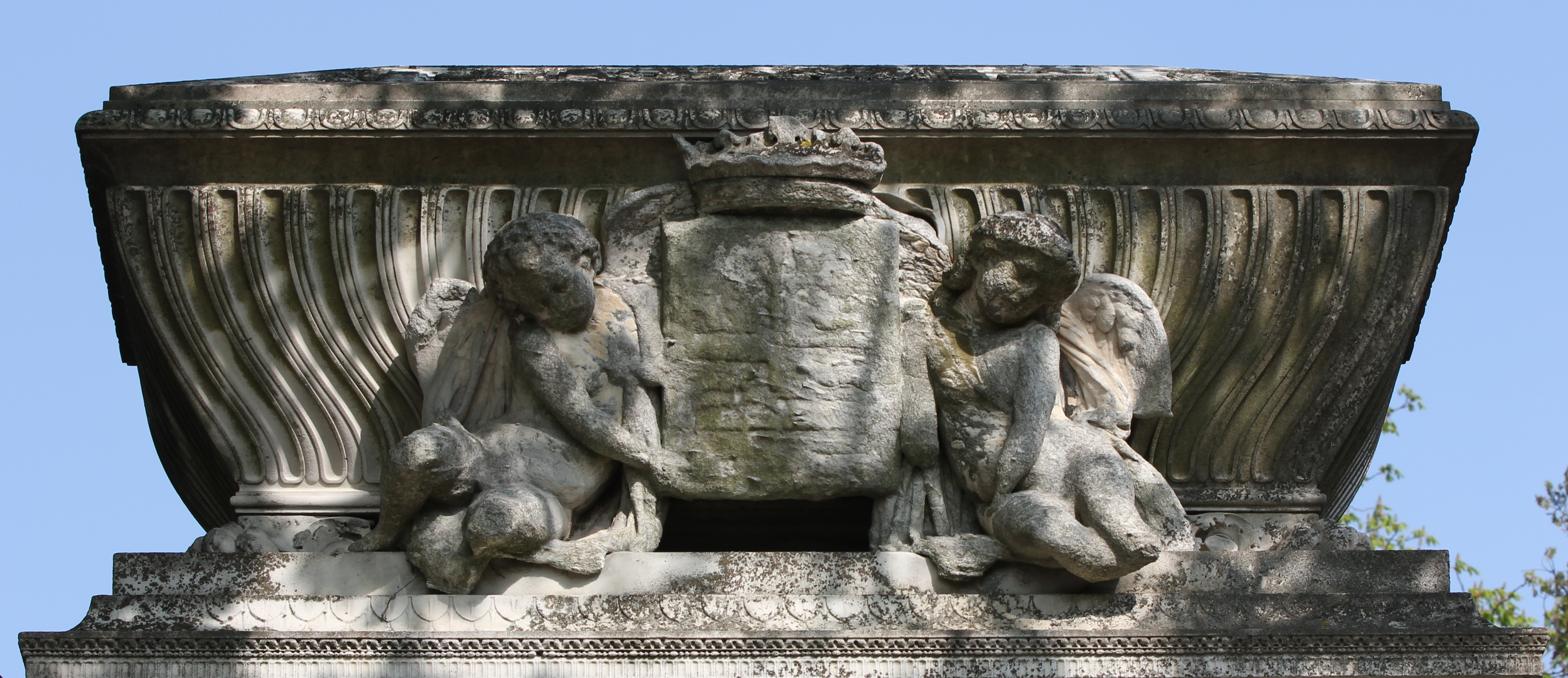
External tomb chest of Alejandro María Aguado, 1st Marquis of the Guadalquivir Marshes, at the Père-Lachaise Cemetery in Paris; made in 1844

The Ancient Egyptians created the first known chests, using wood or woven reeds, circa 3000 BC.

The early uses of an antique chest or coffer included storage of fine cloth, weapons, foods and valuable items.

In Medieval and early Renaissance times in Europe, low chests were often used as benches while taller chests were used as side tables. By placing a chest on the side on any kind of rough table, the inner surface of its lid could be used as a proper writing surface while the interior could house writing implements and related materials, as was the case with the Bargueño desk of Spain. Many early portable desks were stacked chests, with the top one having its lid on the side, to serve as a writing surface when opened.

Many European chests did use the standard band of iron over the lid and the body of the chest to close it or lock it. There were a few different styles of the chest like square box or domed lid chests, which were so different that there was no effective way to categorize them. The lid shape of domed chests, such as those in the 15th to 16th centuries, would have thrown off water and discouraged their use as seats and thus contributed to longer survival.

== Description ==
A chest is a (usually rectangular) box with a removable or hinged lid that can safeguard personal items. Some chests are equipped with locking mechanisms or a metal band that a lock can be secured on. According to Webster's Dictionary (1988), a chest is "a box with a lid and often, a lock, for storing or shipping things" or as "a cabinet as for holding medical supplies, toiletries, etc.".

Chests designed for linens or other soft objects would have a very smooth or sanded interior, and chests made for heavy equipment or weapons would have a coarser interior.

Chests were used primarily as a storage unit in the past, whereas today they are also used as decorative furniture or for seating.

== Types and terminology ==
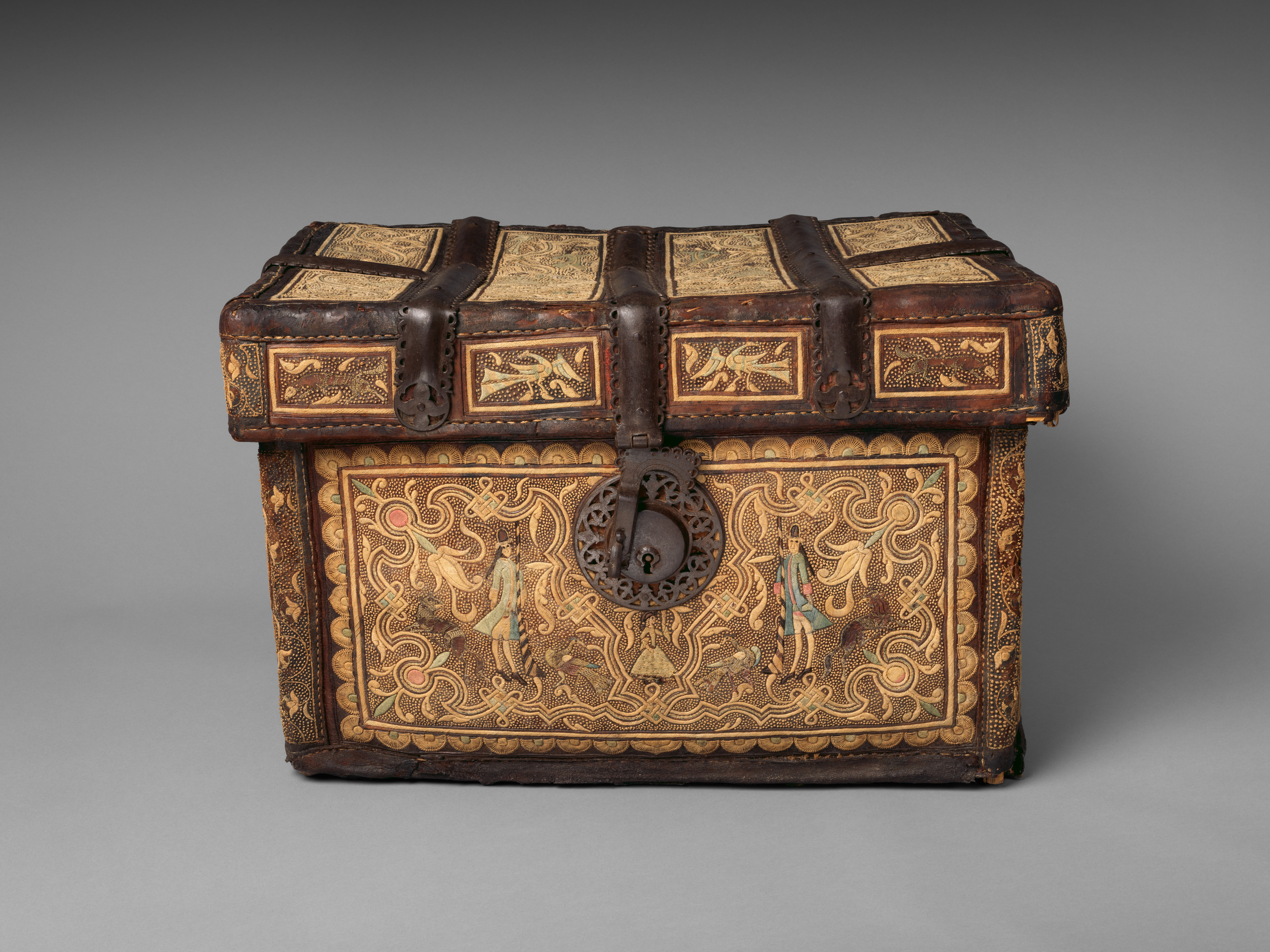
Chest (petaca) from colonial Mexico, c. 1772; now in the Metropolitan Museum of Art

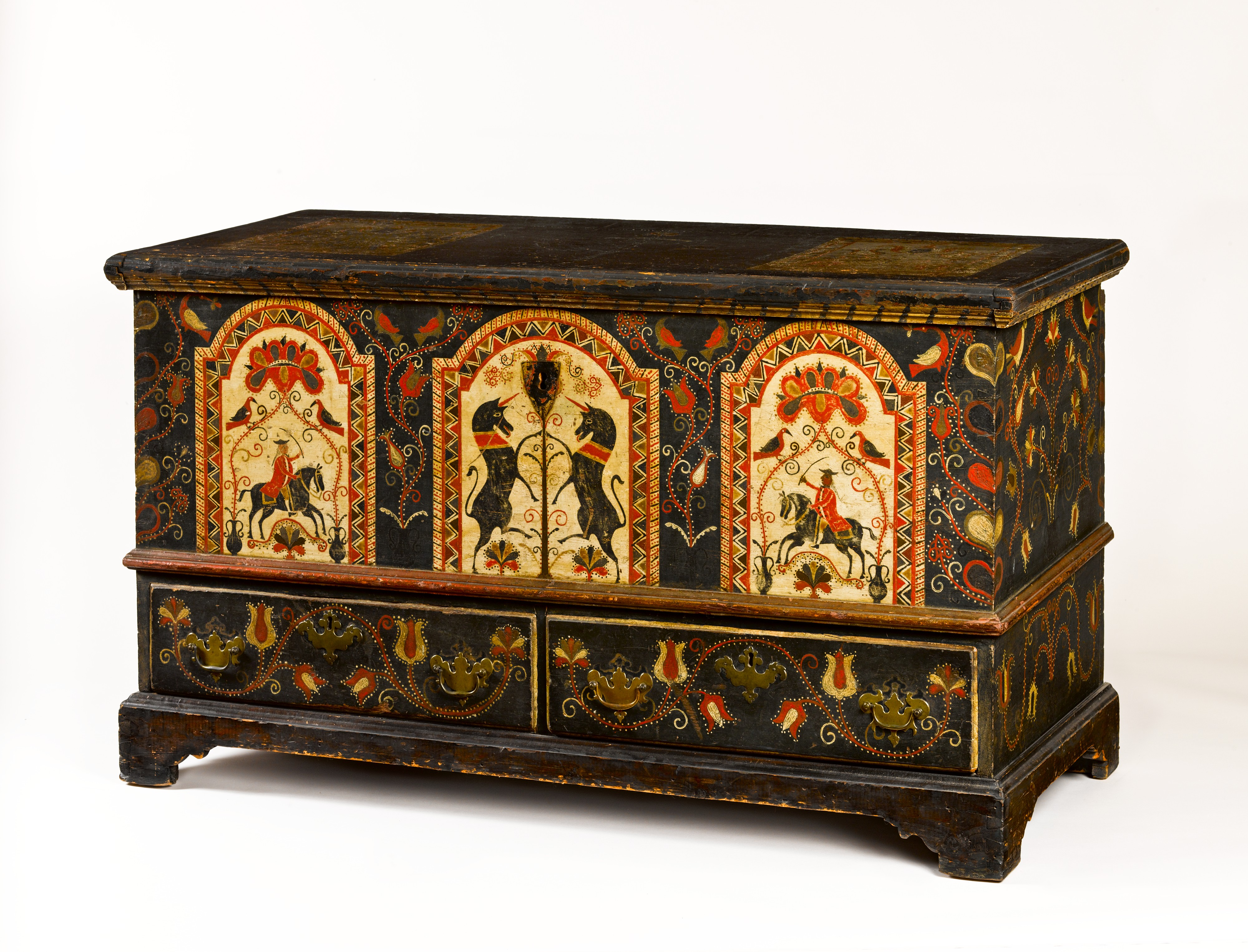
Dower chest, c. 1780, made by immigrants from the Upper Rhine Valley of Germany; Metropolitan Museum of Art

Other words for a chest include:

- coffer, a term used from Medieval times onwards for a storage box, often with a rounded top and covered with leather, and now often implying a use for storing money or other valuable objects
- kist, a word that dates back to 14th century Scotland, derived from Old Norse kista, whereas "chest" derives from Old English cest

A cassone is a kind of carved or painted chest associated with late Medieval and Renaissance Italy. Cassones, also called marriage chests or hope chests, were often used to carry the dowry goods in a marriage ceremony.

A simple chest, called a wakis ("wagon-kist") was commonly used in the Dutch Cape Colony (now part of South Africa) as a seat on a wagon. To make it more usable, it often had a wooden support along the centre of the top so that the seated driver would not slide off so easily. In addition to this use, they were also used for storage at home; keeping clothes, food and other commodities safe. They were frequently made with one or more sides sloping downwards, although the top was always horizontal. Many are made of sturdy woods such as yellowwood and therefore last a long time. Some manufacturers also painted the front of the kist with relatively simply designs reminiscent of, and presumably originating from Europe.

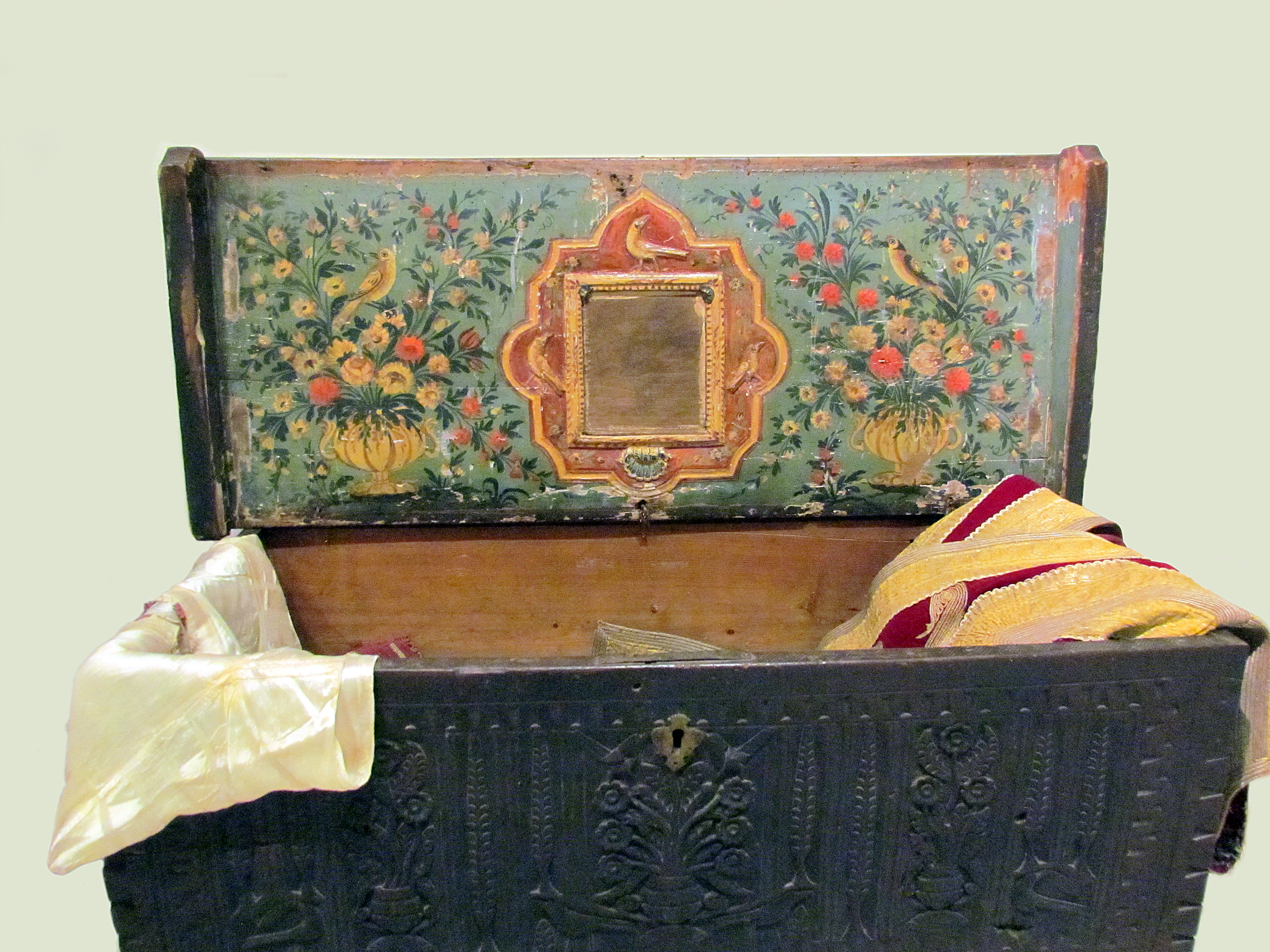
Chest with bride's dowry (Kosovo & Metohija, Serbia)

In some Slavic countries, for example, in Ukraine and Serbia, chests were a family relic, especially in peasant families. Each Ukrainian girl received her own chest at the age of 15 for her future bride's dowry. Peeping in the girl's chest was considered impolite. Coffers were an indicator of a family's wealth. Ukrainian girls and women also used them to keep their garments and some personal items – towels, jewelry, tools for embroidering etc. A big collection of Ukrainian traditional chests dated by the 18–20th cc. is kept in the Radomysl Castle (Zhytomyr Region, Ukraine).

In many Arab countries, chests are used to hold ship captain's personal possessions, such as the Kuwaiti chest. Today, many Middle Eastern furniture chests are known by place names, such as Omani or Bahraini, but this most often refers to where they were purchased rather than where they were made. Others are used to hold linens and household goods collected by girls in preparation for their eventual marriage, and often called a hope chest. In Arabic, two terms are used for the dowry chest: The muqaddimah was specifically for the bride's personal possessions; and the "sunduq", which normally came in matching pairs, were for other goods. In fantasy, fables, and games, treasure chests are frequently used as a plot device to contain treasure such as gold or jewels.

A toy chest is a type of chest that usually carries children's toys, such as dolls or building blocks.

== In popular fiction ==
In the Discworld series by Terry Pratchett, a sentient chest on legs called The Luggage is owned by the first tourist, Twoflower.

== See also ==
- Ark of the Covenant
- Bahut
- Cabinetry
- Chest of drawers, a piece of furniture often referred to as a chest.
- Hope chest
- Trunk, a piece of luggage, similar to a chest
- Wooden box
