= Lowboy =

Type of 18th-century American dressing table

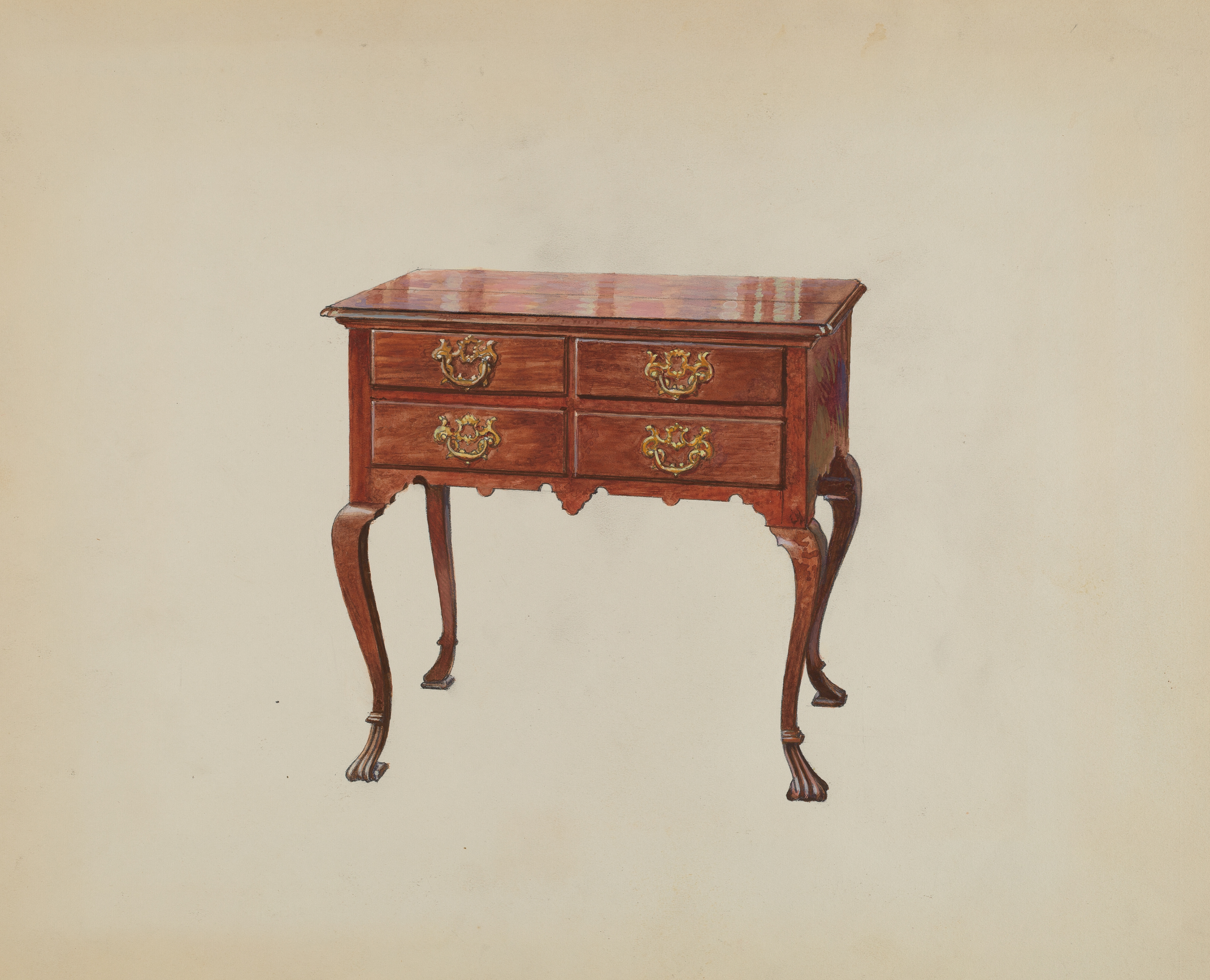
Henry Moore, Lowboy, c. 1936. Image commissioned for the Index of American Design, the watercolor drawing is located within the National Gallery of Art

A lowboy is an American collectors term for one type of dressing table. It is a small table with one or two rows of drawers, so called in contradistinction to (and designed to match) the tallboy or highboy chest of drawers.

== History and description ==
Lowboys and tallboys were favorite pieces of the 18th century, both in England and in the United States; the lowboy was most frequently used as a dressing-table, but sometimes as a side-table. It is usually made of oak, walnut or mahogany, with the drawer-fronts mounted with brass pulls and escutcheons. The more elegant examples in the Queen Anne, early Georgian, and Chippendale styles often have cabriole legs, carved knees, and slipper or claw-and-ball feet. The fronts of some examples also are sculpted with the scallop-shell motif beneath the center drawer.

Another term for a dressing table equipped with mirrors is vanity and is used to apply makeup and other fashion accessories.

== See also ==
- Chest of drawers
- Commode
- List of desk forms and types
- Sideboard

== General and cited references ==
- Campbell, Gordon (2006). The Grove Encyclopedia of Decorative Arts: (Two-volume Set). Vol. 1. Oxford University Press. pp. 61, 331, 479. ISBN 9780195189483.
- Loomis IV, Frank Farmer (2011). Antiques 101: A Crash Course in Everything Antique (2 ed.). Krause Publications. p. 59. ISBN 9781440227387.
- Gloag, John (1952). A Short Dictionary Of Furniture. Read Books Ltd. ISBN 978-1-4474-9772-1. OCLC 1099027952.

Attribution
