= Kuwaiti chest =

A Kuwaiti chest is a large wooden chest, usually having been made in India, and covered in various brass studs and designs. It was primarily used by a captain of Arabian dhows for their personal possessions.
