= Chiffonier =

Either of two types of storage furniture

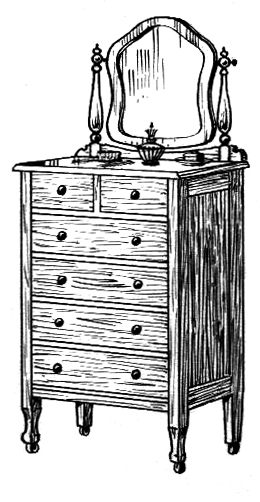
An American chiffonier

The term chiffonier, also chiffonnier, may refer to one of at least two types of furniture. Its name comes directly from a French piece of furniture, the chiffonier. The French name, which comes from the French chiffonnier, "rag-picker", suggests that the item of furniture was originally intended as a receptacle for odds and ends which had no place elsewhere.

== British chiffonier ==
In British usage, a chiffonier is similar to a sideboard, but differentiated by its smaller size and by the enclosure of the whole of the front by doors.

It was one of the many curious developments of the mixed taste, at once cumbrous and bizarre, which prevailed in furniture during the Empire period in England. The earliest chiffoniers date from that time; they are usually of rosewood – the favorite timber of that moment; their furniture (the technical name for knobs, handles, and escutcheons) was most commonly of brass, and there was very often a raised shelf with a pierced brass gallery at the back. The doors were well panelled and often edged with brass-beading, while the feet were pads or claws, or, in the choicer examples, sphinxes in gilded bronze.

== American chiffonier ==
In the United States, a chiffonier is quite different. There it refers to a tall, narrow and elegant chest of drawers, frequently with a mirror attached on top. It is also one half of the American portmanteau piece of furniture called a chifforobe.

== In media ==
- Chapter 39 of Martin Chuzzlewit (1843-44) by Charles Dickens mentions "Well might she take the keys out of the little chiffonier which held the tea and sugar"
- In chapter 80 of Middlemarch (1871-72) by George Eliot, Mr Fairbrother's aunt, Miss Noble, finds her lost lozenge box under a Chiffonier.
- In chapter 1 of The Princess Casamassima by Henry James.
- In chapter 3 of The Invisible Man by H.G. Wells
- Poet and physician William Carlos Williams mentions a chiffonier in verse XIII of the poem "January Morning": "Work hard all your young days/and they'll find you too, some morning/staring up under/your chiffonier at its warped/bass-wood bottom and your soul/—out!"
- A chiffonier is mentioned in chapters 4 and 18 in Gene Stratton-Porter's last novel The Keeper of the Bees (1925)
- It appears five times (chapter 2: once, chapter 3: three times, chapter 13: once) in the novel The Catcher in the Rye by J. D. Salinger.
- The retired courtesan Madame Armfeldt in the Stephen Sondheim musical A Little Night Music sings the couplet "In the castle of the King of the Belgians/ We would visit through a false chiffonier" in her first-act song "Liaisons".
- In episode twenty of Sesame Street, "Oscar Cleans House" (5 December 1969), Oscar the Grouch tells Gordon, "Don't scratch my chiffonier." "Scratch your what?" Gordon asks. "My chiffonier over there," Oscar responds, motioning to the chiffonier upon which Gordon had placed Oscar's bicycle pieces. Gordon then looks at Oscar's chiffonier, says "Your chiffonier?" and shrugs.
- Mrs. Alma Wheatley from Netflix mini-series The Queen's Gambit refers to a chiffonier when she tells Beth to get the supplies needed to take care of her first period. However, this appears to be her bedside night table.
- Buried Prey by John Sandford contains a flashback scene to the early patrol days of Lucas Davenport. In it the young cop and his partner stop two wealthy ladies from fighting over a chiffonier. When the ladies are sent on their way, Lucas asks his partner what a chiffonier is, and the partner describes a Lazy Susan.

== See also ==
- Chifforobe
