= Chest of drawers =

Piece of cabinet furniture

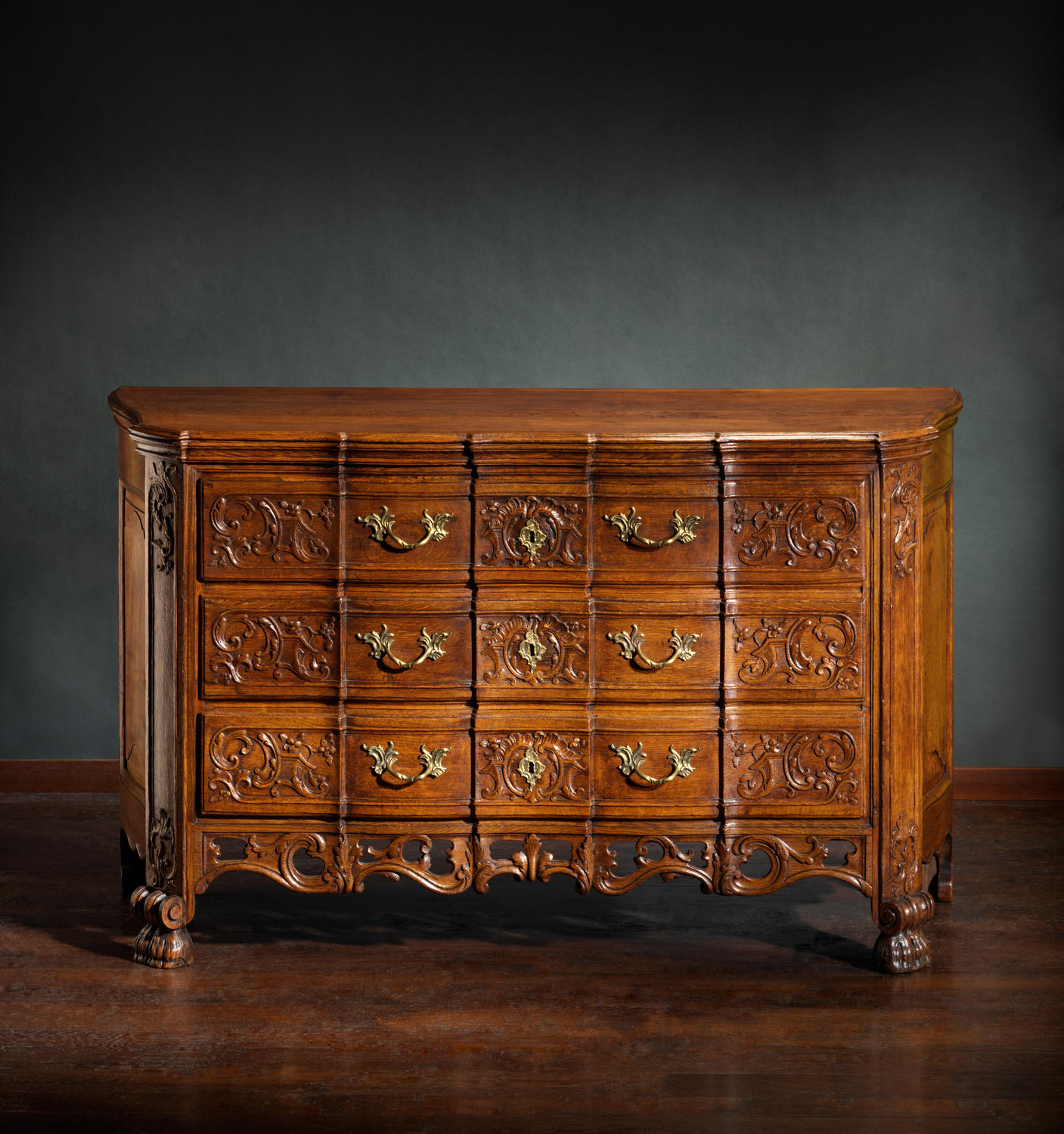
Chest of drawers from the 18th century, collection King Baudouin Foundation

A chest of drawers, also called (especially in North American English) a dresser or a bureau, or informally a Chester Draws, is a type of cabinet (a piece of furniture) that has multiple parallel, horizontal drawers generally stacked one above another.

In American English a dresser is a piece of furniture, usually waist high, that has drawers and normally room for a mirror. In British English a dresser or a Welsh dresser has shelves in the upper section for storing or displaying tableware.

Chests of drawers have traditionally been made and used for storing clothing, especially underwear, socks, and other items not normally hung in or otherwise stored in a closet. They are usually placed in a bedroom for this purpose, but can actually be used to store anything that will fit inside and can be placed anywhere in a house or another place. Various personal sundry items are also often stored in a chest of drawers. It has a long history as one of the stand-bys of a carpenter's workshop. A typical chest is approximately rectangular in overall shape and often has short legs at the bottom corners for placement on the floor.

Chests of drawers often come in 5-, 6-, and 7-drawer varieties, with either a single or a double top drawer. The chest illustrated in this section would be described as a '5 over 2 chest-on-chest', the latter term deriving from the fact that at one time it would have been made as two separable pieces. They are commonly made of wood, similar to many other kinds of furniture, but of course can be made of other materials. The inside of the drawers can be accessed by pulling them out at the front side. It is often placed so that the back side faces a wall since access to the back is not necessary. The lateral sides are also usually made such that they can be placed against a wall or in a corner. Although they can be plain in appearance, chests of drawers can also be made with a fancy or ornamental appearance, including finishes and various external color tones. Traditionally, drawers would slide out on smooth wood rails. Most modern cabinets (such as Filing cabinets) use roll-out shelf sliders, made of metal, with rollers.

Most chests of drawers fall into one of two types: those which are about waist-high or bench-high and those (usually with more drawers) which are about shoulder-high. Both types typically have a flat surface on top. Waist-high chests often have a mirror placed vertically on top, which is often bought with the piece. While a user is getting dressed or otherwise preparing their grooming, they can look at themself in the mirror to check their appearance.

== Terminology ==
The chest drawers were and are called by many names: LAMSAS database contains 37 answers to the request to name a chest of drawers, with "bureau" and "dresser" most popular at 52.5% and 17.5% respectively. Chippendale called them "commode tables" or "commode bureau tables", Hepplewhite used the terms "commodes", "chests of drawers". At the beginning of the 20th century "bureau" became popular in American English. Morse suggests that the name came from the similarities in the construction to "bureau desks", popular in the 18th century.

A chifforobe (from chiffonier + wardrobe) is a combination of a wardrobe and a chest of drawers.

== History ==
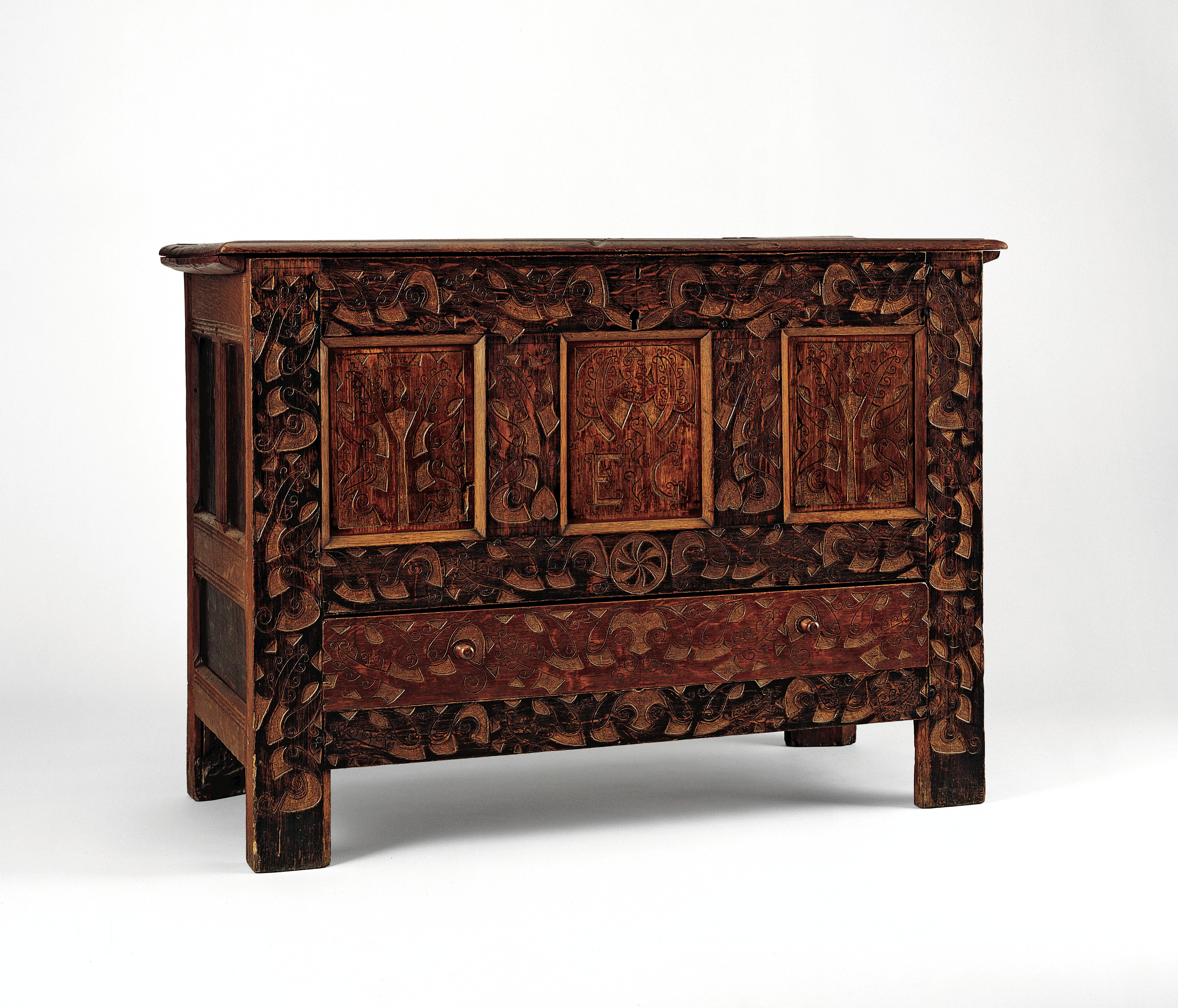
Chest-with-drawer, American, 1690–1710

In late medieval Europe the chest came into widespread use, especially in homes of the nobility. This type, also known as a coffer, was more or less a simple joined wooden box with a hinged lid. It may or may not have stood on feet. An early transitional phase was the installation of one drawer beneath this main compartment. A number of early pieces from the seventeenth century are extant of oak manufacture from England, and corresponding seventeenth-century pieces of French walnut have survived. Some of the early surviving English specimens are from the Charles I period. Nutting ascribes the earliest piece in his Furniture Treasury to "before 1649".

== Styles ==
Mule Chest: A chest commonly wider than it is high and deep. A mule chest has drawers in its base and a hinged top, beneath which there are either two short drawers or one long one. This form, introduced in England in the 1600, was popular for 100 years in England and colonial America.

== Gallery ==
Examples of chests of drawers

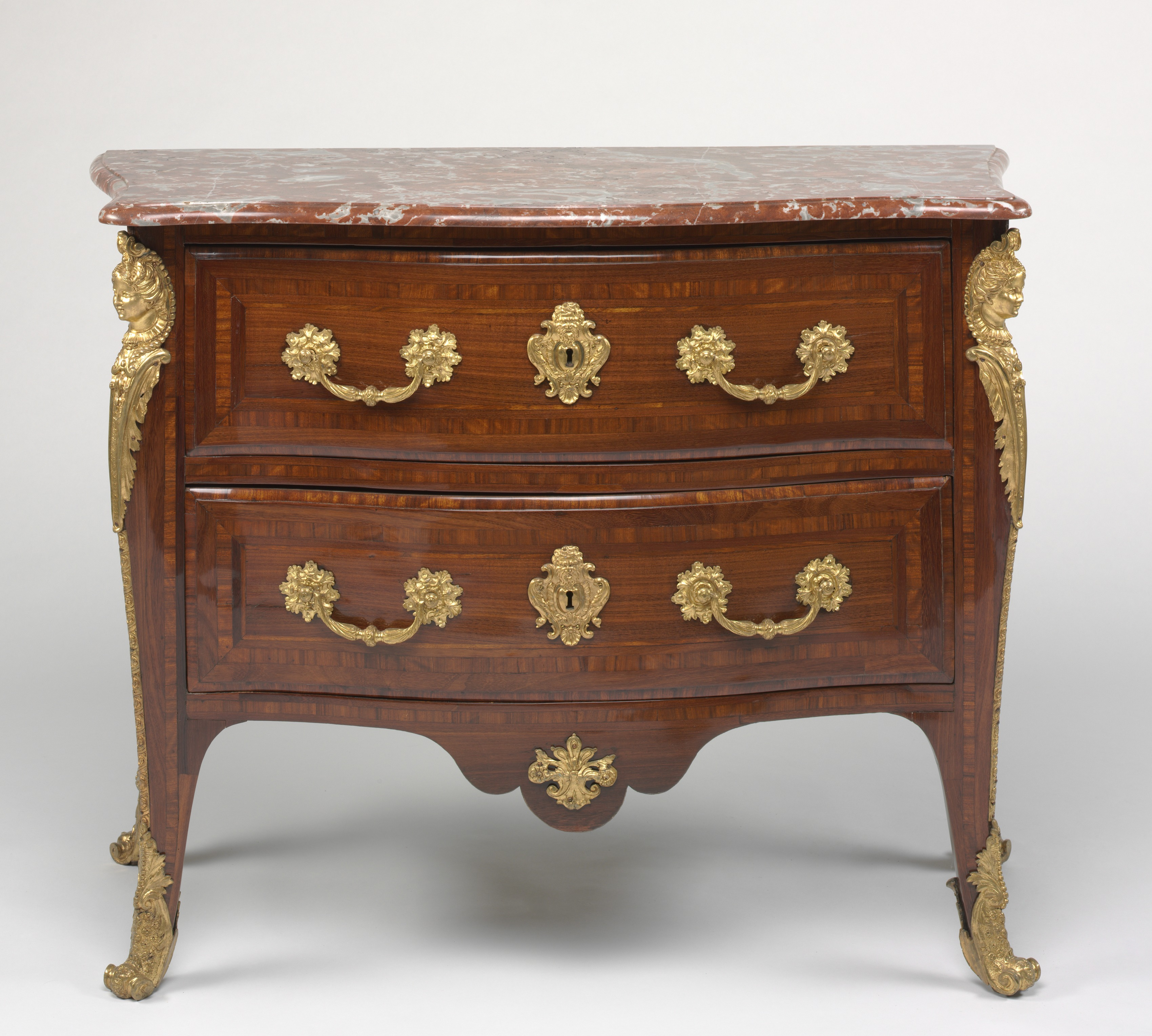
Chest of drawers, circa 1720, Kingwood with gilt-metal mounts and marble, Cleveland Museum of Art

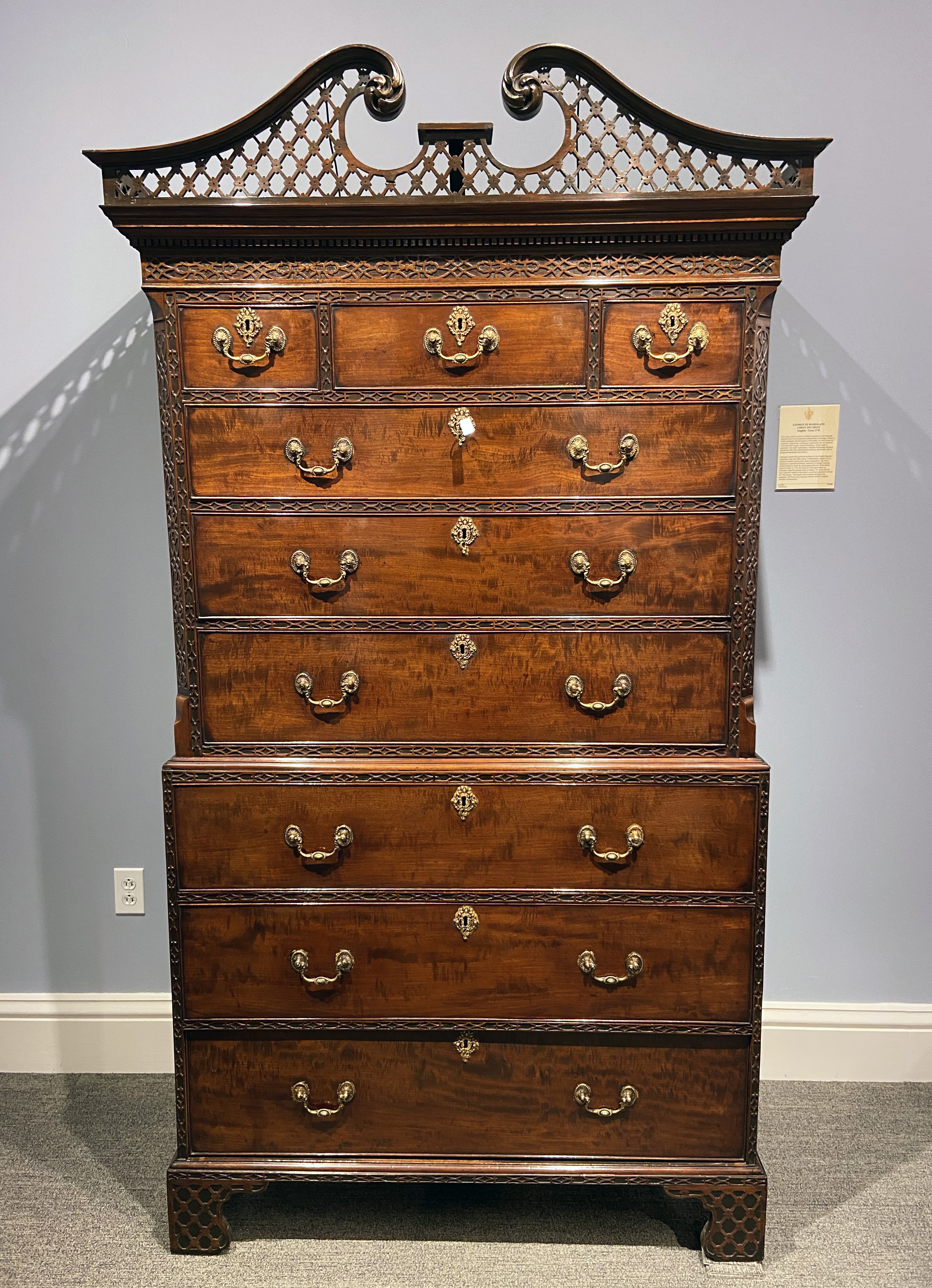
Chippendale-style George III mahogany chest-on-chest, circa 1770

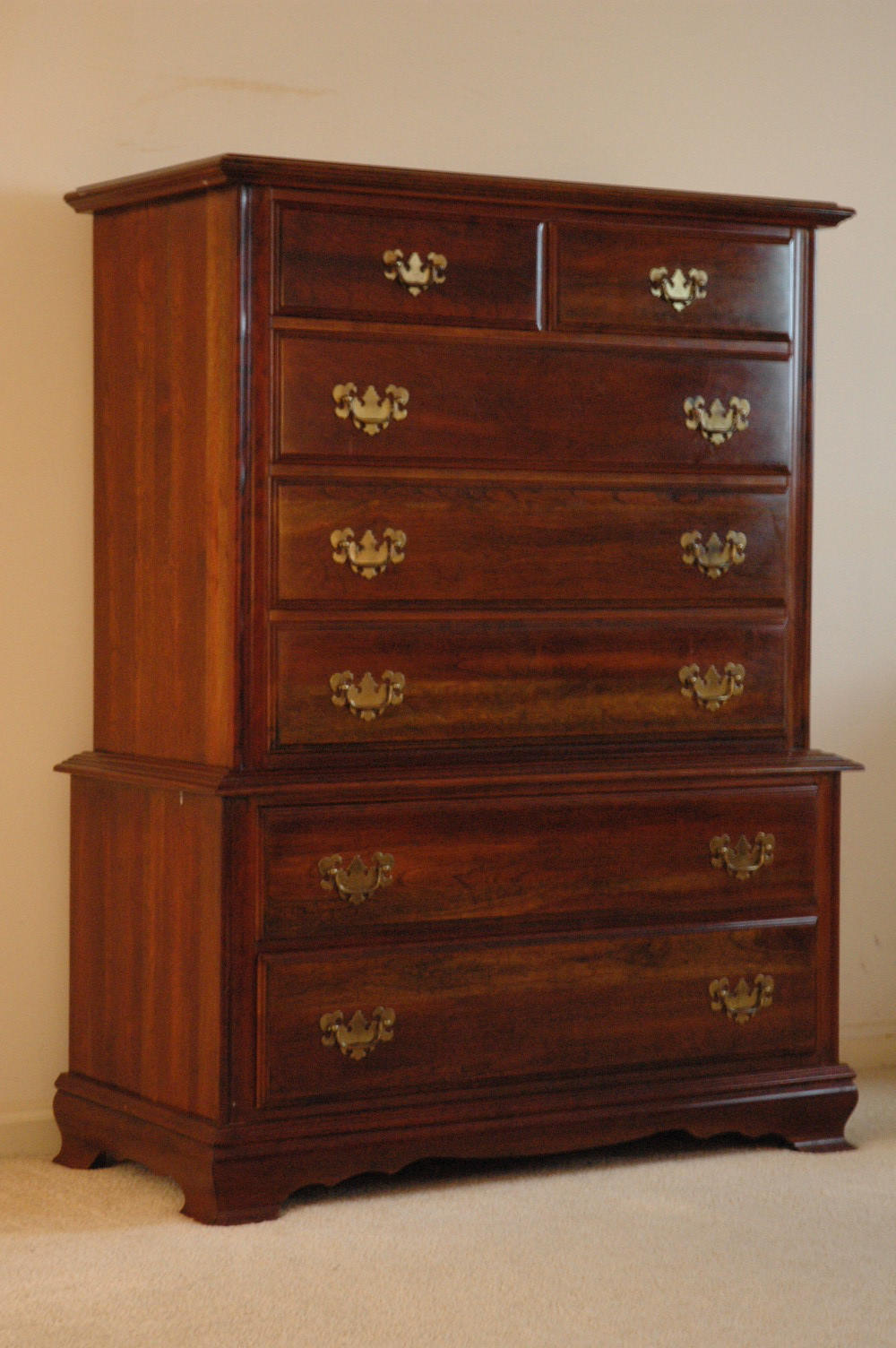
A chest-on-chest, a derivative of the simpler chest of drawers

== See also ==
- Chifforobe
- Commode
- Chiffonier
- Tallboy (furniture)
- Lowboy
- Nightstand
- Tansu
- Welsh dresser
- Keyhole

== Sources ==
- Morse, Frances Clary (1917). "Bureaus and Washstands". Furniture of the Olden Time. Macmillan. OCLC 1000324925.
- Burkette, Allison (1 May 2001). "The story of chester drawers" (PDF). American Speech. 76 (2): 139–157. doi:10.1215/00031283-76-2-139. eISSN 1527-2133. ISSN 0003-1283. S2CID 144842733.
