= Youghal =

Port and resort town in County Cork, Ireland

Youghal Eochaill
- Town
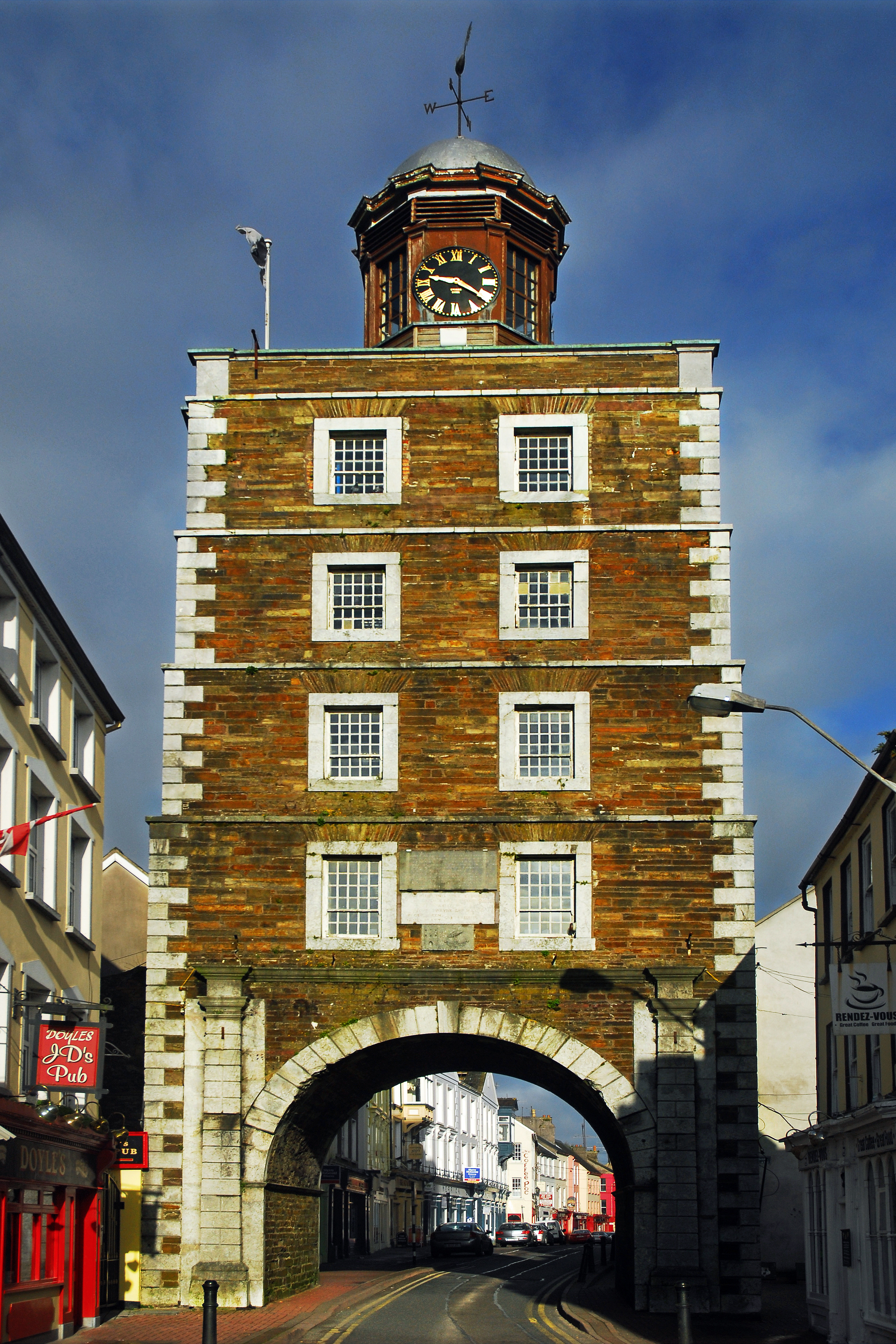
- Youghal's Clock Gate is a symbol of the town

- Coat of arms
- Motto: Portus Incolumis Carinis (Latin, "a safe harbour for keels [ships]")
- Location in Ireland
- Coordinates: 51.95167°N 7.84562°W
- Country: Ireland
- Province: Munster
- County: County Cork
- Local electoral area: Midleton
- Dáil Constituency: Cork East
- EU Parliament: South
- Elevation: 0 m (0 ft)

Population (2022)
  - Total: 8,564
- Time zone: UTC±0 (WET)
  - Summer (DST): UTC+1 (IST)
- Eircode routing key: P36
- Telephone area code: +353(0)24
- Irish Grid Reference: X102781
- Website: youghal.ie

Youghal (/ˈjɔːl/ YAWL; Irish: Eochaill, meaning 'yew wood') is a seaside resort town in County Cork, Ireland. Located on the estuary of the River Blackwater, the town is a former military and economic centre. Located on the edge of a steep riverbank, the town has a long and narrow layout. As of the 2022 census, the population was 8,564. The town is in a civil parish of the same name.

As a historic walled seaport town on the coastline of East Cork, and close to a number of beaches, it has been a tourist destination since the mid-19th century. There are a number of historic buildings and monuments within the town's walls, and Youghal is among a small number of towns designated as "Irish Heritage Ports" by the Irish Tourist Board.

== Name ==
The name Youghal comes from the Irish Eochaill meaning "yew woods", which were once common in the area. Older anglicisations of this name include Youghall, Yoghel and Yochil.

== History and architecture ==
Youghal received its charter of incorporation in 1209, but the history of settlement on the site is longer, with Viking settlements dating back to the 11th century, the Church of Coran in the town's western suburbs dating from the 5th century, and evidence of Neolithic habitation at nearby Newport.

Older buildings in the town include Sir Walter Raleigh's home "Myrtle Grove" and the St Mary's Collegiate Church, thought to have been founded by St Declán around 450. The church was rebuilt in Irish Romanesque style in about 750, and a great Norman nave was erected in about 1220. It is one of the few remaining medieval churches in Ireland to have remained in continuous use as a place of worship. The Vikings used Youghal as a base for their raids on monastic sites along the south coast of Ireland, and a stone in St Mary's Collegiate Church bears the ancient etched outline of a longboat. Since the 16th-century Plantation of Munster it has been the place of worship of the Church of Ireland congregation of Youghal and its surrounding areas.

The Sack of Youghal took place on 13 November 1579. As the centre of English power in south Munster the town was badly damaged during the Second Desmond Rebellion when it was sacked by the forces of Gerald FitzGerald, 14th Earl of Desmond, who massacred the garrison, hanged the English officials, and looted the homes of Youghal's townspeople. The revenge killings that followed this included that of a priest, Daniel O'Neilan, OSF, on 28 March 1580. He was fastened round the waist with a rope and thrown with weights tied to his feet from one of the town-gates at Youghal, finally fastened to a mill-wheel and torn to pieces.

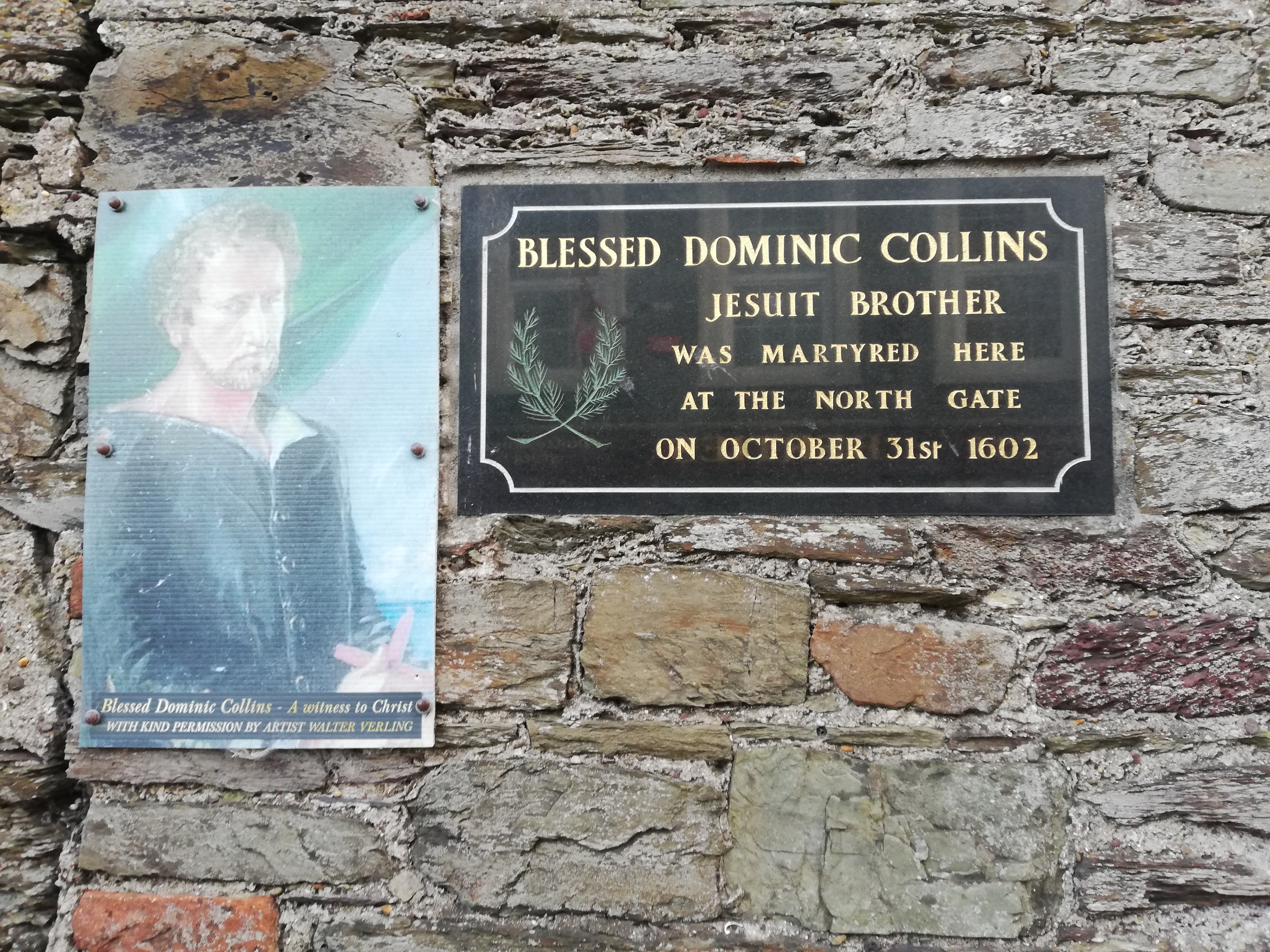
Site of Blessed Dominic Collins' martyrdom

Taken prisoner following the Siege of Dunboy 1602, the Jesuit lay brother Dominic Collins was brought to his native Youghal in chains. And, after telling a Youghal crowd (in English, Irish and Spanish) that he was happy to die for the Catholic faith, he was hanged on 31 October 1602. He was beatified in 1992, as one of the 24 Irish Catholic Martyrs.

The first record of the walls is a charter of 1275, granted by King Edward I, for their repair and extension.

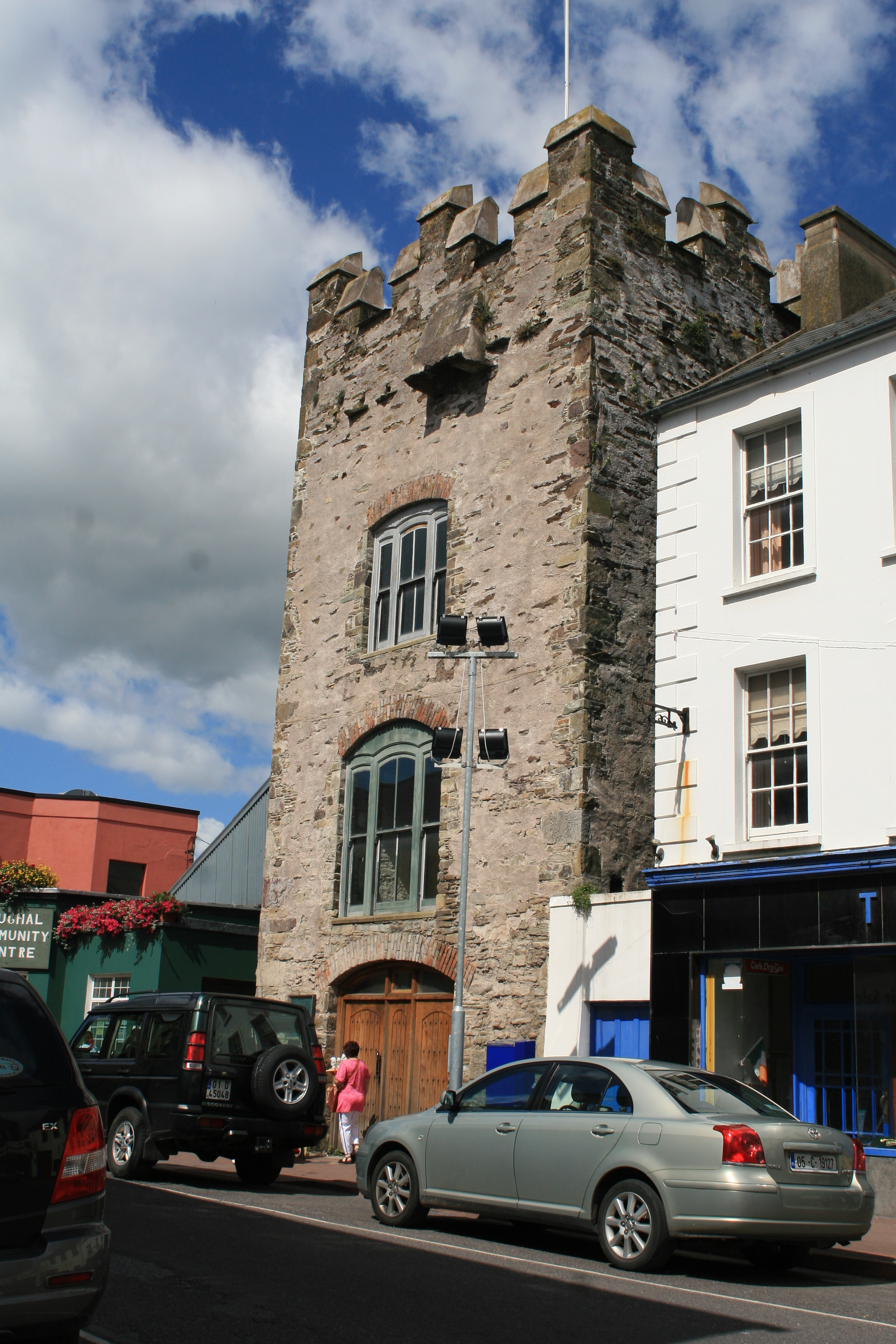
Tynte's Castle

Clock Gate Tower – In 1777, the town's Clock Gate Tower was built on the site of Trinity Castle, part of the town's fortifications. It was used as a prison during the rebellion of 1798. The military hanged suspects from a pole lashed from the lower windows to the corner of the first house on South Main Street (now Luigi's). Thomas Gallagher was one of those hanged for trying to seduce a soldier from allegiance to his regiment. Numerous forms of torture were conducted therein including thumb screws, pitch-cap, rack and flogging. The Clock Gate served the town as jail and public gallows until 1837.

Tynte's Castle – a late 15th-century urban tower house. It is almost the only fortified relic of the era now in Youghal. It was built by the Walsh family in 1602 and leased by the corporation to the Tynte family towards the end of the reign of King James I. It is shown in a map of Youghal dated 1663 as one of the defences of the town. The building was passed down through the Tynte family and is now the property of the McCarthy family.

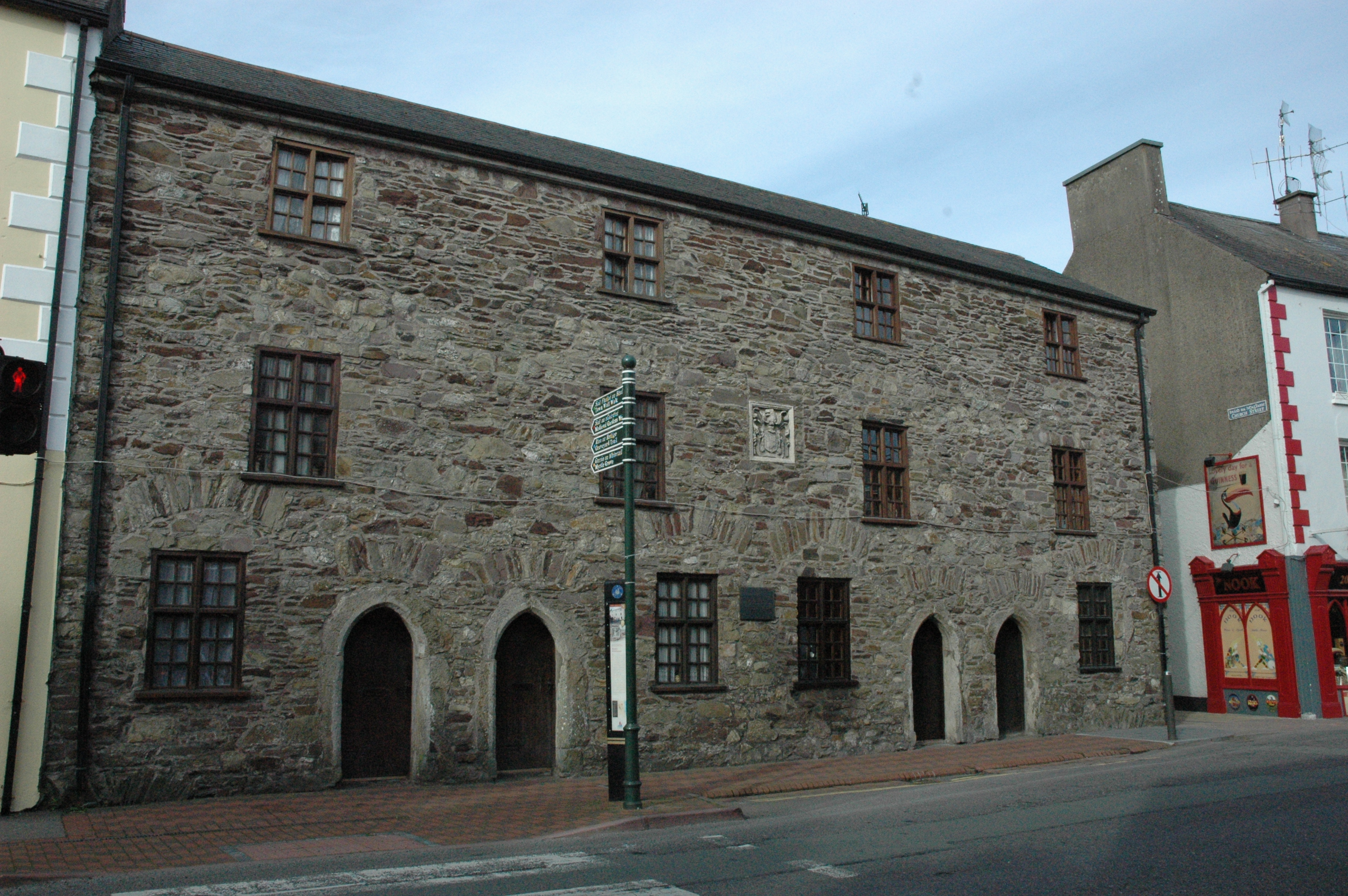
The Alms Houses

Alms Houses – the 17th-century almshouses were constructed by Richard Boyle, 1st Earl of Cork in 1602 for widows. Each tenant received two shillings a week, enough to sustain her. Around the same time (1612), Sir Richard Boyle built a hospital and a free school. For his efforts in colonising Munster, Sir Richard Boyle was granted the title and dignity Lord Boyle in 1616. When a poll tax of two shillings was introduced in 1697, those living by alms were exempt. Boyle's tomb is in St Mary's Collegiate Church.

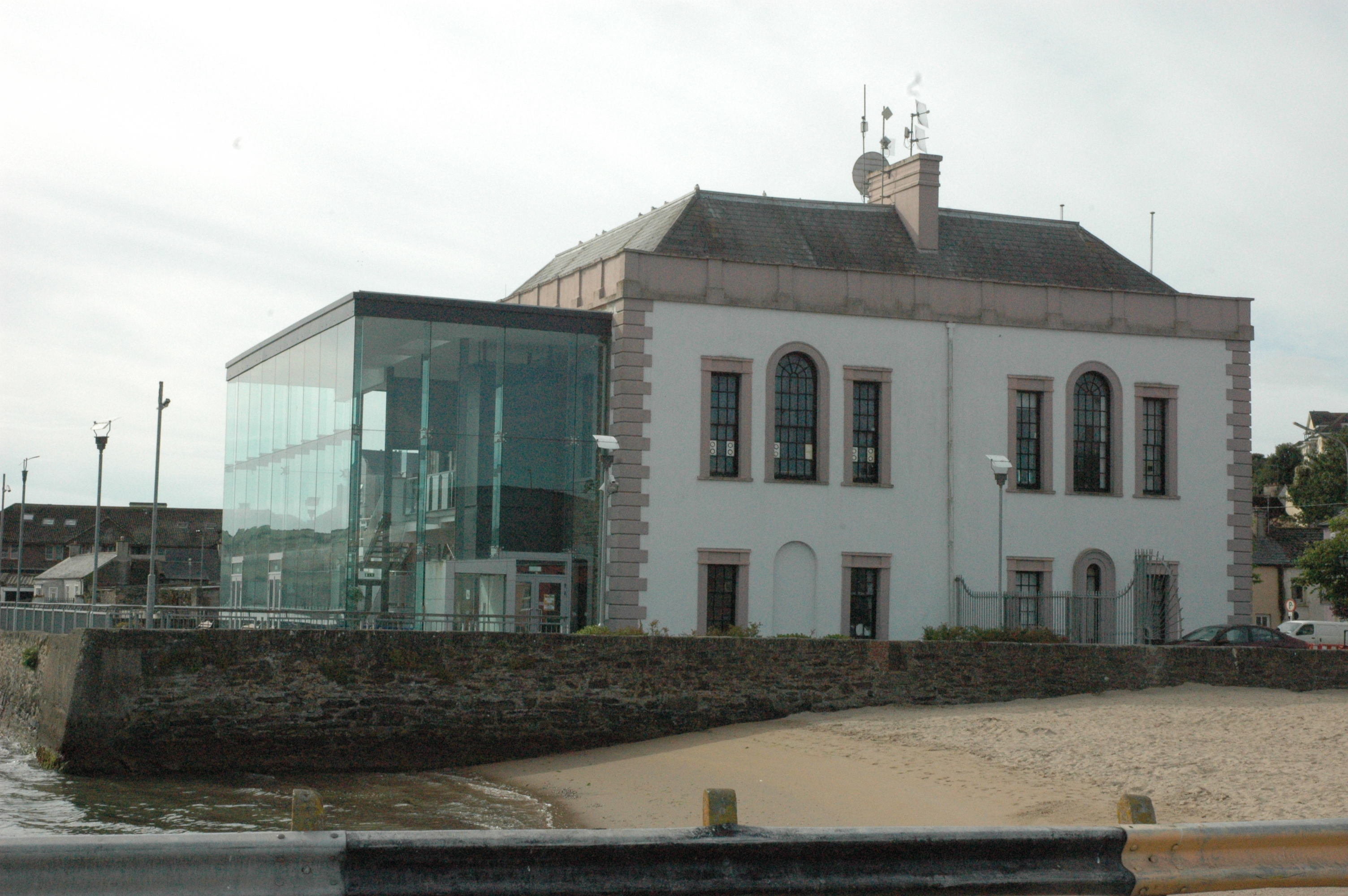
Youghal Town Hall

Youghal Town Hall – A new town hall was erected by the corporation, to replace an earlier tholsel, in 1779. It contained a corn exchange, council house, custom house and grand jury room.

Water Gate – The town's Water Gate was built in the 13th century to provide access through the town walls to the docks. Also known as Cromwell's Arch, it was from here that Oliver Cromwell left Ireland in 1650, having overwintered in the town after his campaign in Ireland.

Youghal was the first town in Ireland or Britain to have a Jewish mayor when William Annyas was elected to that position in 1555; and the town's small but significant Huguenot settlement provided a number of mayors such as Richard Paradise (1683), Edward Gillett (1721) and Joseph Labatte (1752)

Youghal Priory – In 1350, the monastery of St John the Evangelist was founded. It was an affiliated branch of the wealthy Benedictine Priory of St John of Waterford. The main priory building appears to have been intended to combine a fortress with a religious retreat. Oliver Cromwell fixed his residence at the Priory of St John's on the main street in winter 1649.

Myrtle Grove – When Sir Walter Raleigh reputedly brought the first potatoes from Virginia to Ireland in 1585, he planted them at his home at Myrtle Grove, Youghal. For the following two years he was mayor of the town. Queen Elizabeth I granted him 42,000 acres (170 km^{2}) of land in Youghal. He lived at Myrtle Grove, where he entertained the poet Edmund Spenser. In the gardens are four yew trees said to have been planted by Raleigh. Raleigh made his final trip from Cork to the West Indies in 1617.

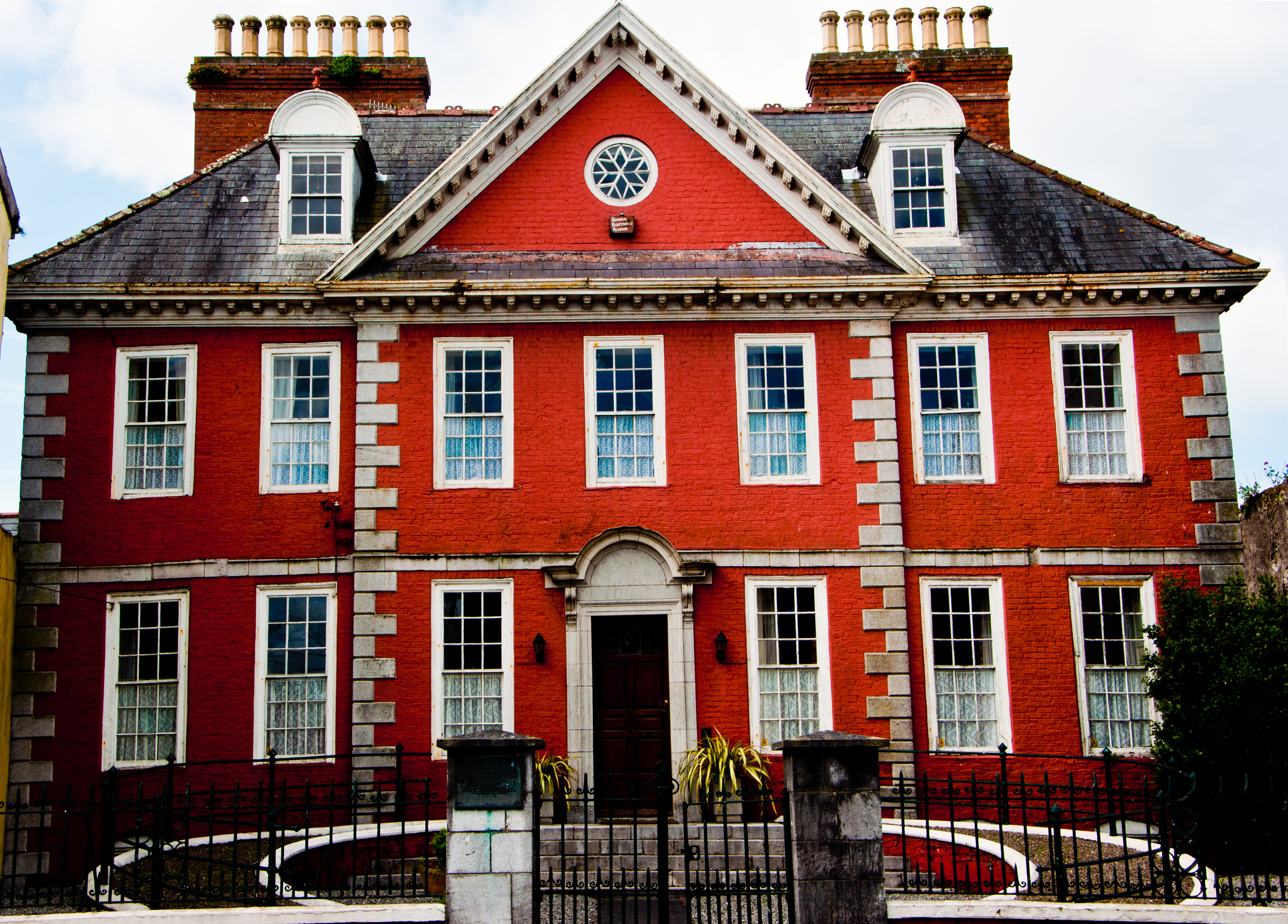
Red House

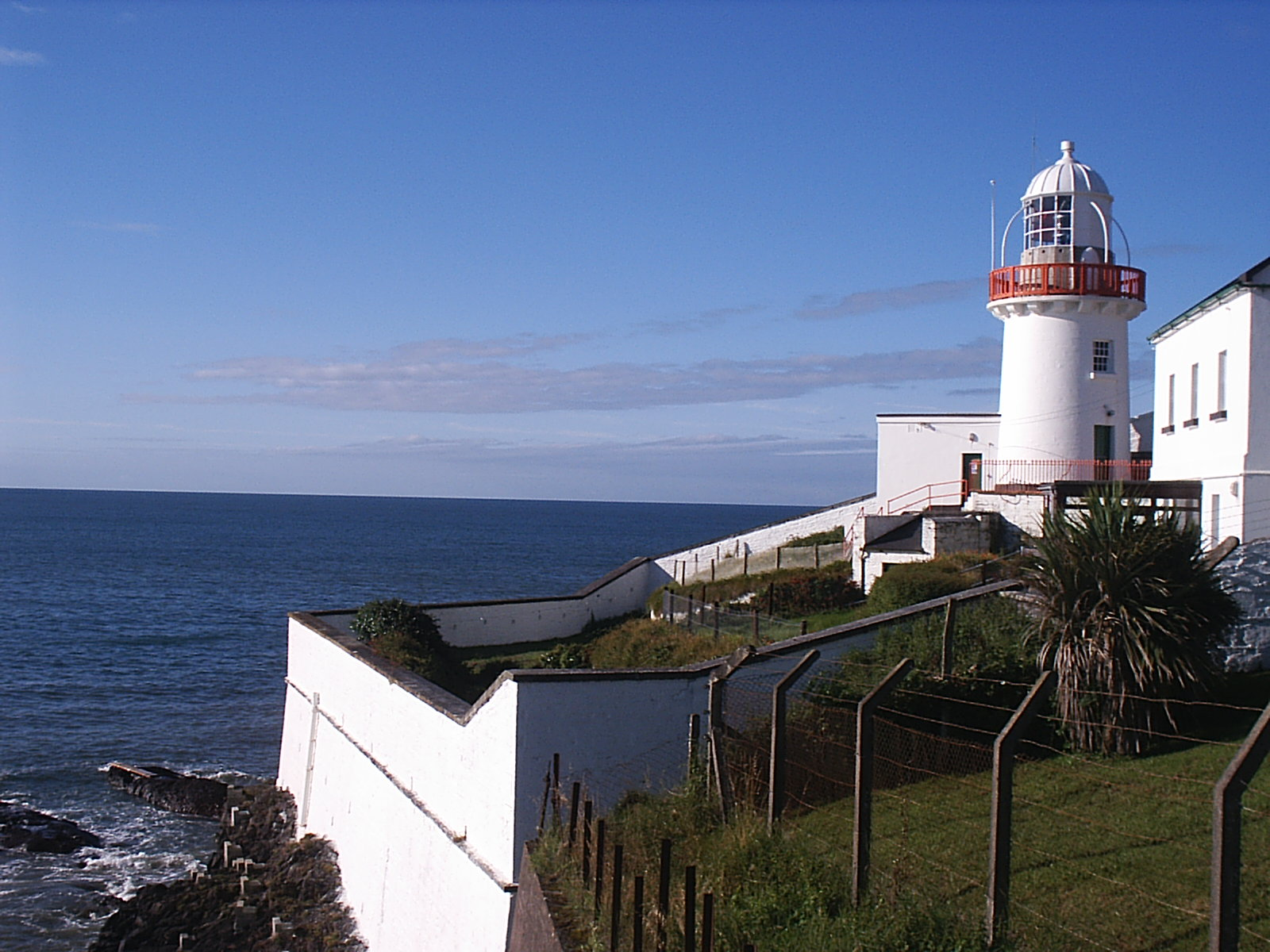
Youghal Lighthouse

Red House – The Red House is an early 18th-century brick townhouse which was built for the Uniacke family, a merchant family in Youghal. It was completed in 1703.

Youghal Lighthouse – In 1202, the Geraldine proprietors of the town built a lighthouse on the cliff at the west side of the mouth's harbour. The original tower was seven-and-a half metres (25') tall and three metres (10') in diameter. They also endowed a nunnery called the Chapel of St Anne under the condition that the nuns should see that the light was regularly maintained. The nuns did so until the reformation in the 1530s, when the lighthouse and the convent were confiscated. The beacon was discontinued in about 1542. The current lighthouse, made from granite imported from Scotland, was designed by George Halpin and work began on its construction in 1848. It was not until February 1852 that the harbour light was first displayed. The lantern is 78 feet (24 m) above sea level.

=== Port and harbour ===
According to Geoffrey Keating (Seathrún Céitinn), in late March 830 there was a "great convulsion of nature" in the province of Munster. This changed the flow of the River Blackwater moving its mouth from Whiting Bay and forming the harbour of Youghal. 1,010 people were lost by a fierce storm when the sea broke its banks. Soon afterwards in 853 a detachment from the Viking invasion built a fortress in Youghal and laid the foundation of a commercial seaport. In 1130, St Bernard writes of Lismore as the capital city of Munster and describes Youghal as the port of Lismore.

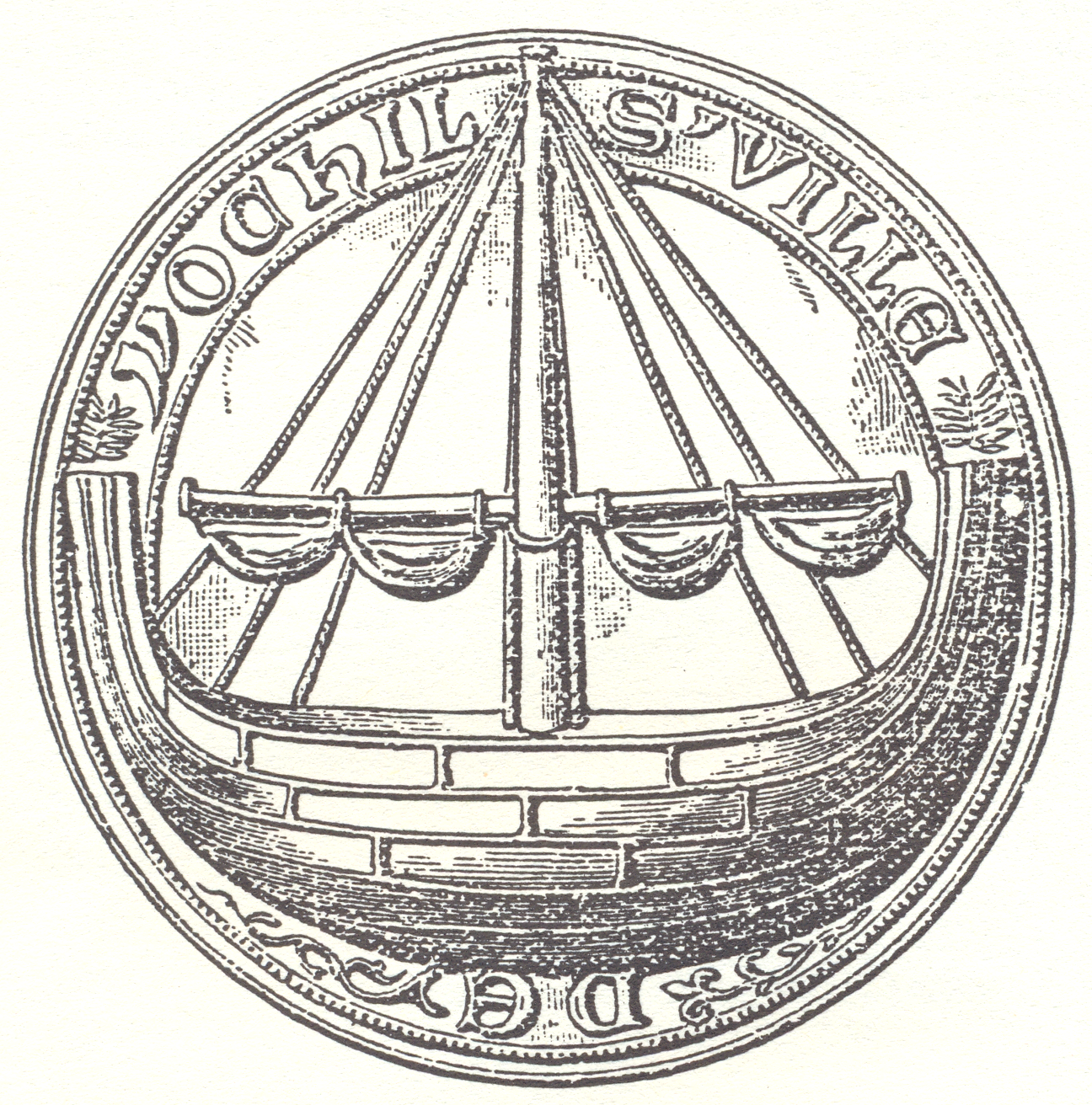
Seal from 1527, depicting a medieval ship

Youghal was incorporated in 1209 by King John and the town was colonised with men-at-arms, traffickers and other adventurers from Bristol. By 1223 Youghal had gained such importance as a commercial port that it merited a 'road highway'. In 1291 several Flemish merchants were recorded as trading to Youghal. For their encouragement King Edward I granted special privileges to continue until All Saints Day (1 November). Large quantities of silver coinage of the Youghal region from the 14th century have been found indicating the high levels of traffic in the region. On 14 February 1301 King Edward I, when going into battle with Scotland, required two boats from all Irish and English ports. But three boats were required from Youghal, further indicating its size and importance.

In 1353, the freeman of Youghal were allowed freedom in trade in different staples throughout England and Wales for wool, leather, woolfels and lead. In 1360 Writs signed by Almaricus de St Åland, Justiciary of Ireland, were directed to Sovereign and Bailiffs of Youghal, ordering them to prevent persons from going to foreign parts. In 1373 King Edward III commanded the Keeper of the port to press and detain ships in the port for the purposes of conveying James Le Botiller, Earl of Ormond, whenever the Earl may come to the port on the King's services. In 1376 the same King granted the Mayor of Youghal privileges for services against rebels in Cork. In the same year the merchants and commons of Youghal complained to Edward about the dangers of having to go to Cork to pay customs, and succeeded in arranging a new customs system for paying in Youghal.

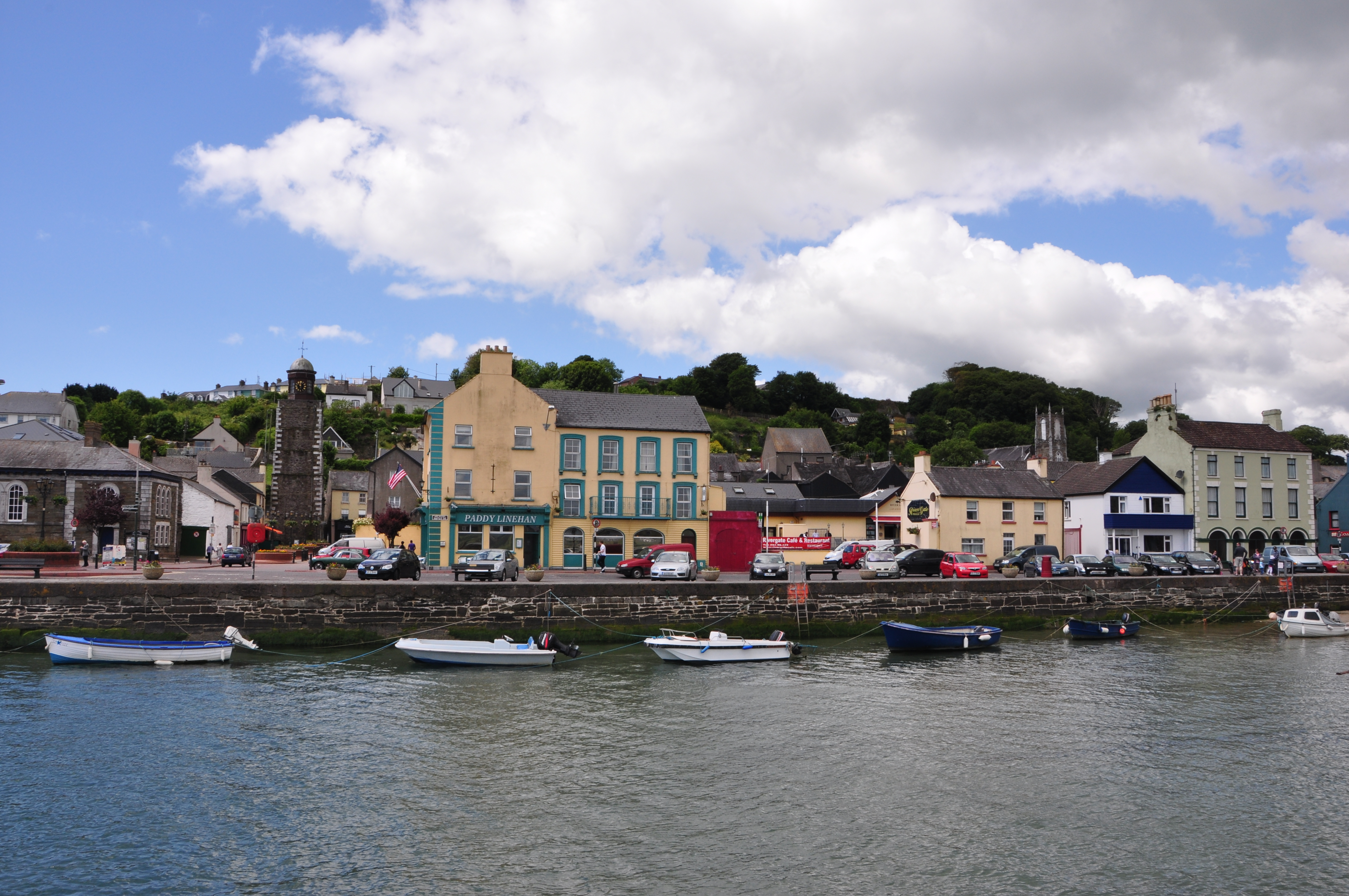
Youghal from the harbour

The Dublin Parliament passed an Act concerning the imports, customs and mines in 1585 which made Youghal one of the privileged ports. Wine could then be discharged at Youghal, Cork, Waterford, Dublin, Limerick, Drogheda and Galway. Discharge at any other location, unless occasioned by stress of weather, meant forfeiting half to Queen Elizabeth I and half to the seizer. In early 1600 Youghal was elevated to the rank of 'staple town', receiving the exclusive rights to carry on the wool trade with Bristol, Liverpool, Chester and Milford. During the 17th century Youghal was one of Ireland's main ports, far more important than Cork Harbour which was described as 'a port near Youghal.' In 1603 King James I made a visit and was proclaimed on the quay in Youghal. In 1631 pirates of all nations swarmed the seas entering Youghal on several occasions. The most notorious of them was Nutt, who had three ships under his command.

By 1640 tobacco, originally introduced by Raleigh, had so fixed itself on the habits of the people, that it now formed one of the staples of trade at Youghal port. Oliver Cromwell, having regained Dublin, Wexford and Waterford for the English rule, arrived in Youghal on 6 December 1649. After resting for the winter in Youghal, Cromwell and his army crossed the Blackwater at Mallow and went on to yield Kilkenny and Clonmel before returning to Youghal and later England where Charles II had arrived. 1683 and 1684 saw great sickness and death in Youghal. In 1689 by order of King James II colonisers with a "zealous attachment to the Protestant religion" were rounded up and detained in castles in Youghal where they were held for 12 months before being released to flee back to England.

In 1695, having made an ingenious sundial, a schoolmaster was admitted as a freeman of Youghal. When Protestants of France were compelled to leave their own country by Louis XIV in 1697 many came to Ireland and settled in Youghal, bringing industry, intelligence and wealth. By 1716 Youghal council began inserting covenants into leases of ground skirted by the waterside, binding the leases to build quays. Gradually great enclosures from the sea were made which doubled the area of the town.

In the 1700s the Red House, a William and Mary style house, was built; it still survives with many original features.

In 1727, the Irish were permitted to trade in the town as scarcity and famine swept the country. There were riots in Youghal as people sought to prevent the export of corn to England and other parts of Ireland. Great sickness and mortality continued through 1734. In 1736 and 1745 the town walls were extensively repaired and in 1745 the Sally-port was remade.

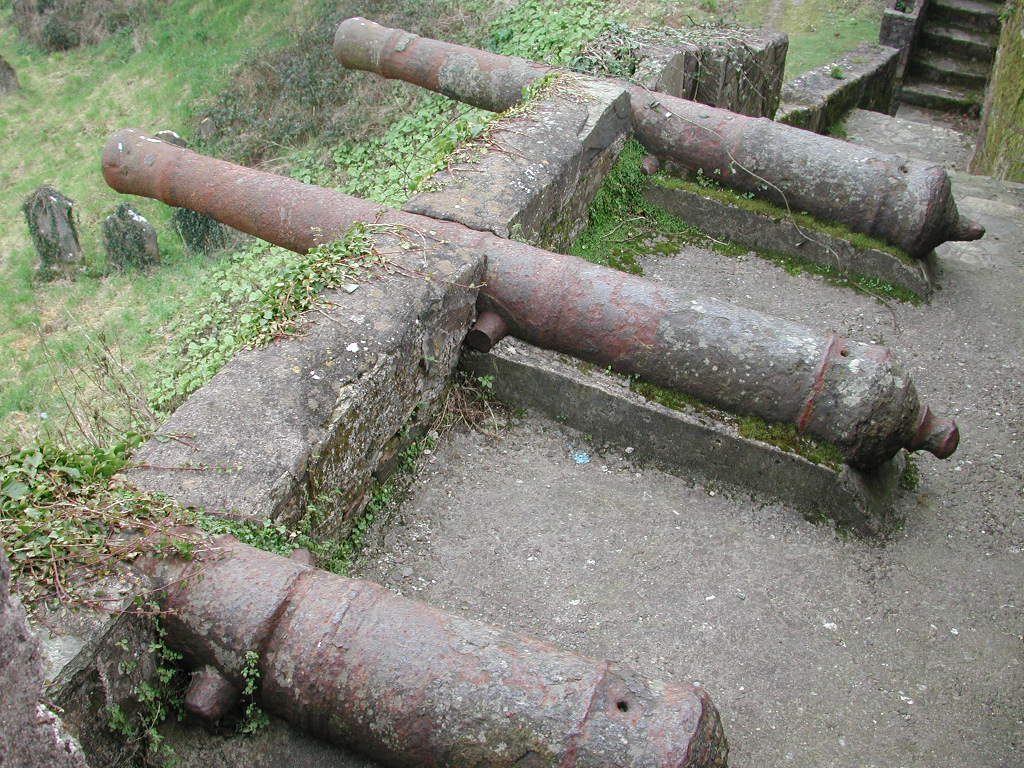
Cannon Battery at Youghal

Trade in Youghal varied greatly. In 1753 no corn, meal salt or flour was imported into Youghal from March to November of that year. In 1754 exports were 65 quarters of beans. 1755 saw exports of 214 quarters of barley, and 70 quarters of beans. Exports in 1756 were 450 quarters of Barley, 45 barrels of Oatmeal and imports were 6 barrels of beer. In 1757 exports were 495 quarters of Oats, 20 barrels of Oatmeal and imports were 11.25 barrels of beer. Works had commenced at this time on improving navigation of the Blackwater (1755) and a petition had been sent to Parliament to open roads from Lismore, Cappoquin and Clogheen to Youghal.

In 1762 a French privateer took six ships near the harbour. The commander landed 24 passengers on the Island of Ballycotton and took the remainder with him as recruits for Colonel Owen's regiment. The cutter Expedition was sent in pursuit but did not come up with them. By 1780 wool combining business was carried on with great spirit in Youghal, where the Annals tell us "great fortunes were realised". Exports from Youghal were extensive in 1781, with more oats being exported than from any other port in Ireland. Nealson's Quay was built and commenced the following year. Grattan Street was opened along the quay that had been embanked.

In 1833, nine ships and 440 colliers entered the harbour. In 1834, there were 250 fishing boats in the harbour employing 2,500 men. Salmon was plentiful and was sold for 1 1/2d per pound weight. After many years of discussion and feasibility testing, the steamer The Star commenced plying on the Blackwater in June 1843. It was hoped that opening the Blackwater would reduce trade costs with Lismore, Fermoy, Mitchelstown and Mallow. On an objection from the Duke of Devonshire – who owned the weir at Lismore – and some other gentlemen, the river was not opened beyond Lismore, and so the steamer service ceased in 1850. The following year the Youghal Fisheries District had over 500 registered vessels employing over 2,700 men.

From the 18th century onwards, and as with nearby Ardmore, some larger ships were unable to get into Youghal Harbour, because of a shallow sandbar at its mouth.

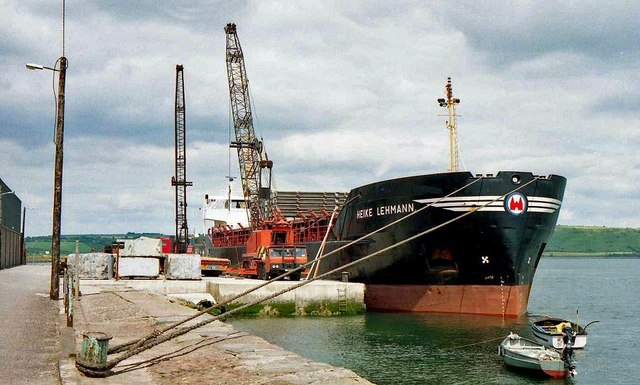
A ship at Youghal's quay in the 1990s

A cross-river passenger ferry continued from Youghal to the opposite side of the harbour. The ferry capsized on 30 September 1876 and 14 people died. In 1882 a decision of the House of Lords established the claim of the Duke of Devonshire to exclusive fishery rights to the river Blackwater and Youghal Bay out to Capel Island. The duke's claim was founded on a grant given to Sir Walter Raleigh by Elizabeth I, which he sold shortly afterward to the Boyle family.

In the 1950s, most exterior shots of "New Bedford" in John Huston's movie adaptation of Moby Dick were filmed in Youghal, as New Bedford itself had changed too much in the intervening century to be usable for this purpose.

Youghal International College, a private international (Spanish) school, was opened in Youghal in 1992.

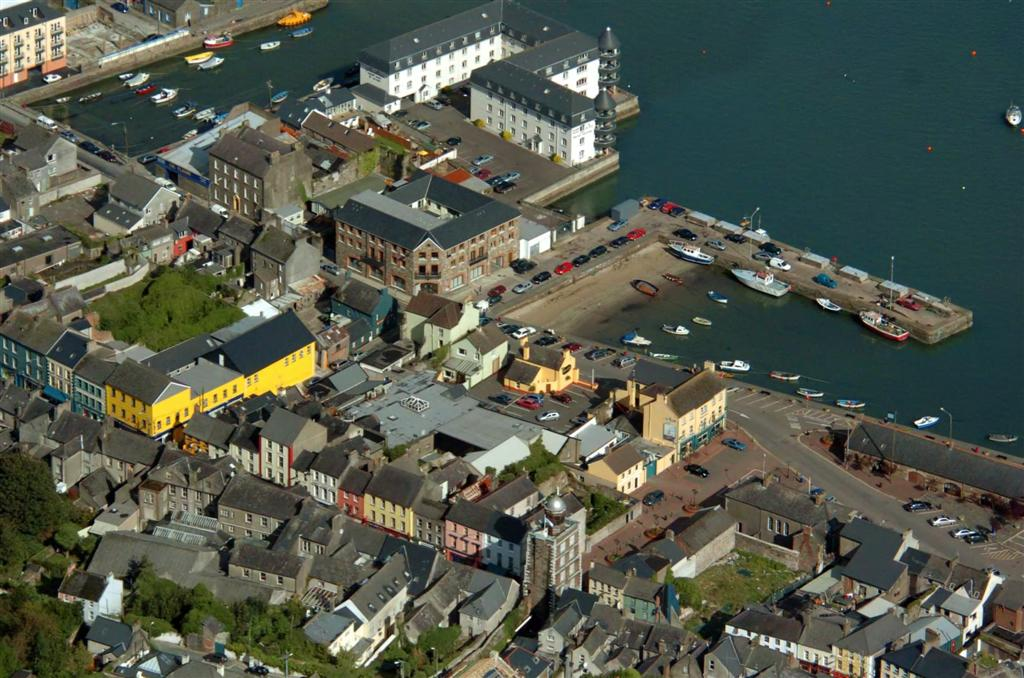
Youghal from the air

Youghal was formerly a strong manufacturing town, but Ireland's economic success since the mid-1990s to a large extent bypassed the town, and the infrastructural deficit is a major constraint to its growth. In April 2011 it was reported that all the town's large factories had closed over the past decade, leaving at least 2,000 people jobless, and with unemployment approaching 20%, young people were leaving in search of work and workers commuting from Youghal to Cork and Waterford.

== Government and politics ==
The town was governed by the nine-member Youghal Town Council. Since the 2014 local elections and the abolition of the town councils under the Local Government Reform Act 2014, the town is represented by the East Cork Municipal District Council on Cork County Council which has 6 elected councillors representing the district.

Youghal is within the Cork East Dáil constituency.

== Tourism ==
=== Beaches ===
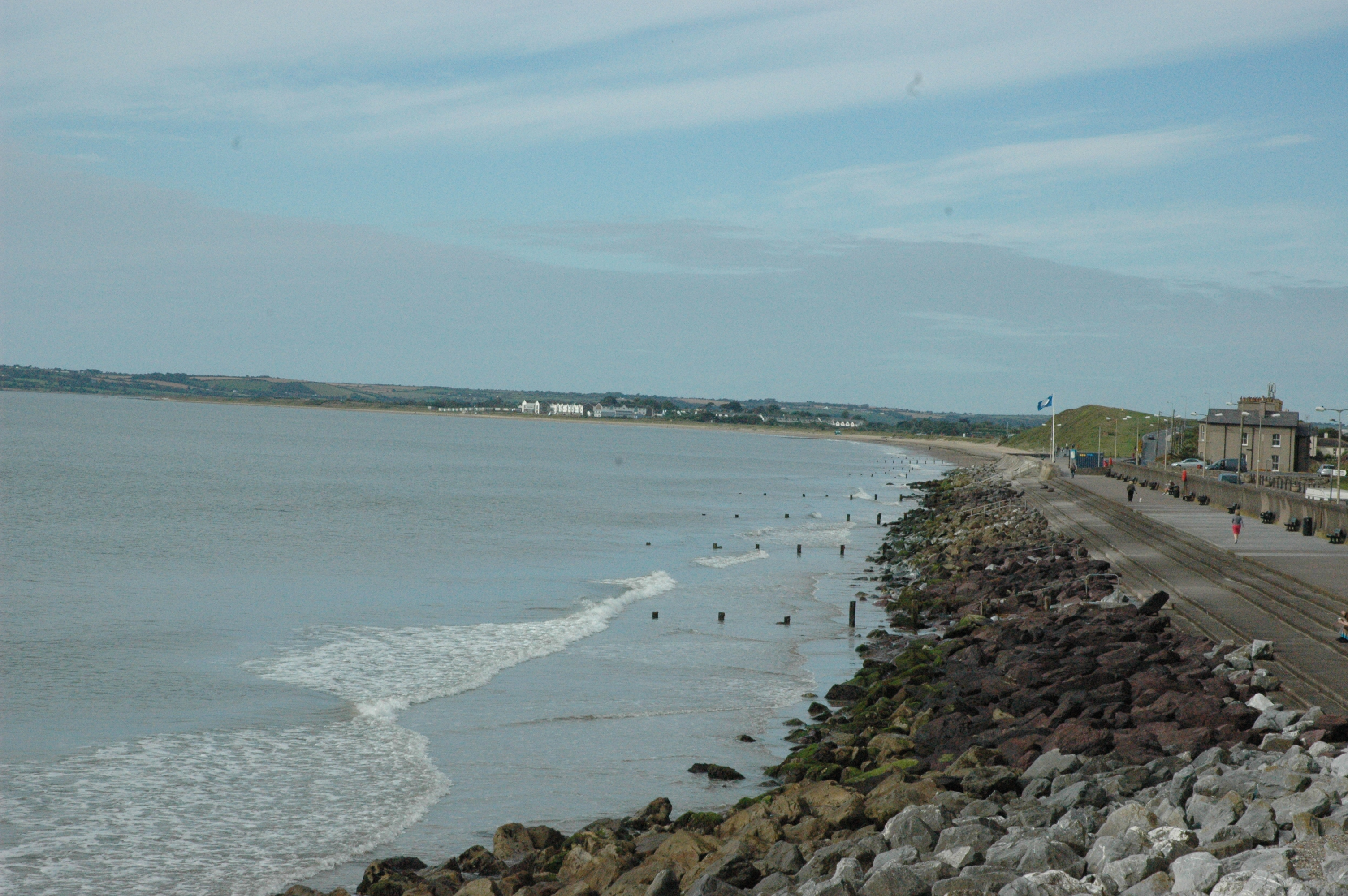
The Front Strand with the tide in

Youghal adjoins a number of beaches including the 5 km (3 mi) beach to the west of the town. In 2011 Youghal's three beaches, Front Strand, Claycastle and Redbarn, were awarded blue flags for water cleanliness and availability of amenities. Ballyvergan Marsh, the largest freshwater coastal marsh in County Cork which accommodates a number of plant and bird species, stretches along Claycastle Beach and on towards Redbarn Beach.

In the mid-20th century Youghal was a popular seaside resort, with thousands taking the train to the beach. According to An A to Z of Youghal: The history and people of Eochaill, Sir Arthur Conan Doyle vacationed in Youghal with his wife and created the character of "Inspector Youghal" of the CID for The Adventure of the Mazarin Stone. While the closing of the railway line in the 1970s triggered a period of decline in Youghal, there has been increased investment since the 1990s to restore the town's facilities and popularity.

Redbarn beach is overlooked by a resort and residential area that includes a hotel, swimming pool, shop, sauna, crêperie, outdoor bar, café, caravan park and several self-catering holiday homes. Along the coast of this beach is a promenade, starting at the Quality Hotel and ending around the Aura swimming pool.

=== Amenities and events ===
Amenities in Youghal include an 18-hole golf course, floodlit tennis courts, GAA pitches, soccer pitches, 18-hole pitch and putt course, rugby pitches, greyhound racing, an indoor family entertainment centre with bowling, laser and a soft play area for children, squash and badminton courts, a leisure centre with a swimming pool, gyms, art galleries, a snooker club, a birdwatching hide at Ballyvergan Marsh, and a museum.

Youghal was declared one of the tidiest towns in Cork (and nationally) in the 2012 IBAL anti-litter league (run in conjunction with the Department of the Environment).

In 1914 the Youghal Pipe Band was founded. In 1984, the band was featured on the BBC programme "Jim'll Fix It", and in 1993 were invited to perform in Larmor, Brittany, France. Between 1995 and 1997, Youghal Pipe Band took part in competition for the first time, winning several awards. In 1969, St Mary's Brass and Reed Band was founded, and went on to win competitions such as the South of Ireland Band Championships.

Youghal hosted the Irish Ironman Triathlon in 2019, 2022 and 2023.

== Transport ==
Cork Airport is the nearest airport, and is located 54 km (34 miles) from Youghal. Bus Éireann operate a service between Youghal and Cork city. Other Bus Éireann services run to Ardmore, Dungarvan, Kilmac and Waterford City.

Youghal railway station, which opened on 1 May 1860, was closed to passenger services on 4 February 1963, and closed completely (including to goods traffic) on 30 August 1982.

== Notable people ==
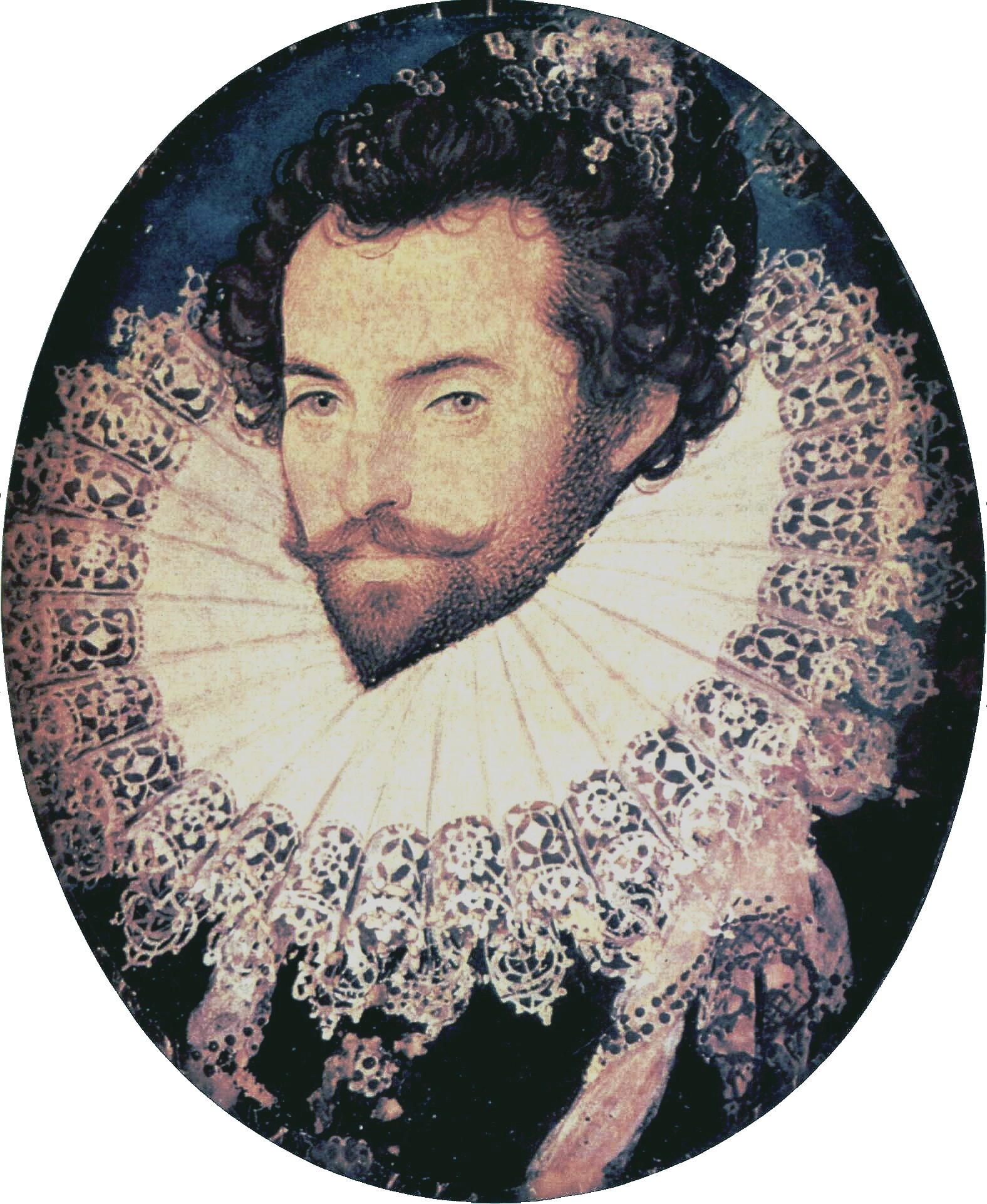
Walter Raleigh, Mayor of Youghal, by Nicholas Hilliard, c. 1585.

- William Annyas (Hebrew: Ben Yohanan) was elected Mayor of Youghal in 1555. He was the first Jew to hold such an elected position in Ireland. His grandfather was a Marrano Jew who had emigrated from Belmonte, Portugal.
- Charles Spearman Armstrong (1847–1924), pioneer tea planter in British Ceylon, was born in Youghal.
- Richard Boyle (1566–1643), 1st Earl of Cork, was "closely associated with the history of Youghal, buying the town as part of his acquisition of the Munster estate of Sir Walter Raleigh". He had a residence at Youghal, known today as "The College", close to St Mary's Collegiate Church.
- Claud Cockburn (1904–1981), journalist, and his wife Patricia, artist and traveller, lived in Raleigh's house in the town, Myrtle Grove, for many years. He described Youghal as "standing at a slight angle to the universe".
- William Cooke Taylor (1800–1849), writer, journalist, historian and anti-Corn Law propagandist, was born in Youghal.
- Christy Cooney, appointed chair of the Gaelic Athletic Association (GAA) in 2009.
- Abraham Dowdney (1841–1886), United States Representative from New York; officer in the Union army during the American Civil War; born in Youghal.
- Katherine FitzGerald (died 1604), Countess of Desmond, lived in nearby Finisk Castle. She is said to be buried, along with her husband, in a Franciscan friary at Youghal.
- Will Hanafin, journalist and radio personality.
- John Huston (1906–1987), filmed part of Moby Dick in Youghal, with the town standing in for New Bedford. A pub in the town bears the name of the movie.
- Colm Keane, author and broadcaster.
- Ben Mitchell (born 1994), rugby player, began his career with Youghal RFC.
- Florence Newton (fl. 1661), alleged witch, known as the "Witch of Youghal"; her trial is described as one of the most important examples of Irish witch trials.
- Jake O'Brien (b. 2001), professional footballer who grew up in Youghal and played for local club Youghal United FC before ultimately moving to French club Olympique Lyonnais.
- Eddie O'Sullivan (b. 1958), born in Youghal, was former head coach of the Irish rugby team and United States national rugby union team.
- Walter Raleigh (c.1552–1618) was Mayor of Youghal in 1588 and 1599 and lived at Myrtle Grove, the Warden's Residence of the Collegiate Church.
- Davy Russell (b.1979), National Hunt racing jockey.
- William Spotswood Green (1847–1919), naturalist and marine biologist.
- William Trevor (1928–2016), novelist; spent some of his early years in Youghal, and featured the town in his short story "Memories of Youghal".

== Photo gallery ==
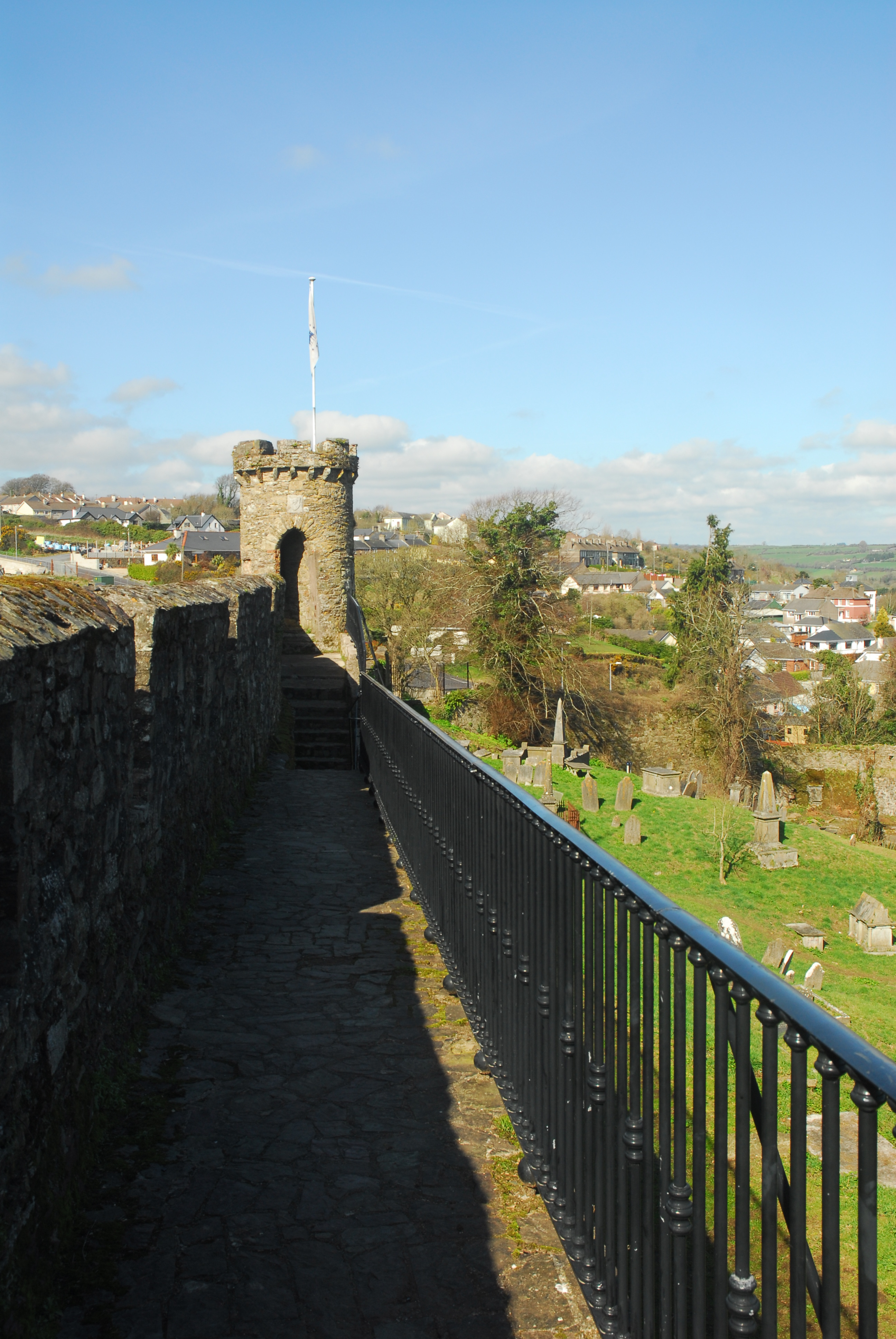
Youghal Town Walls

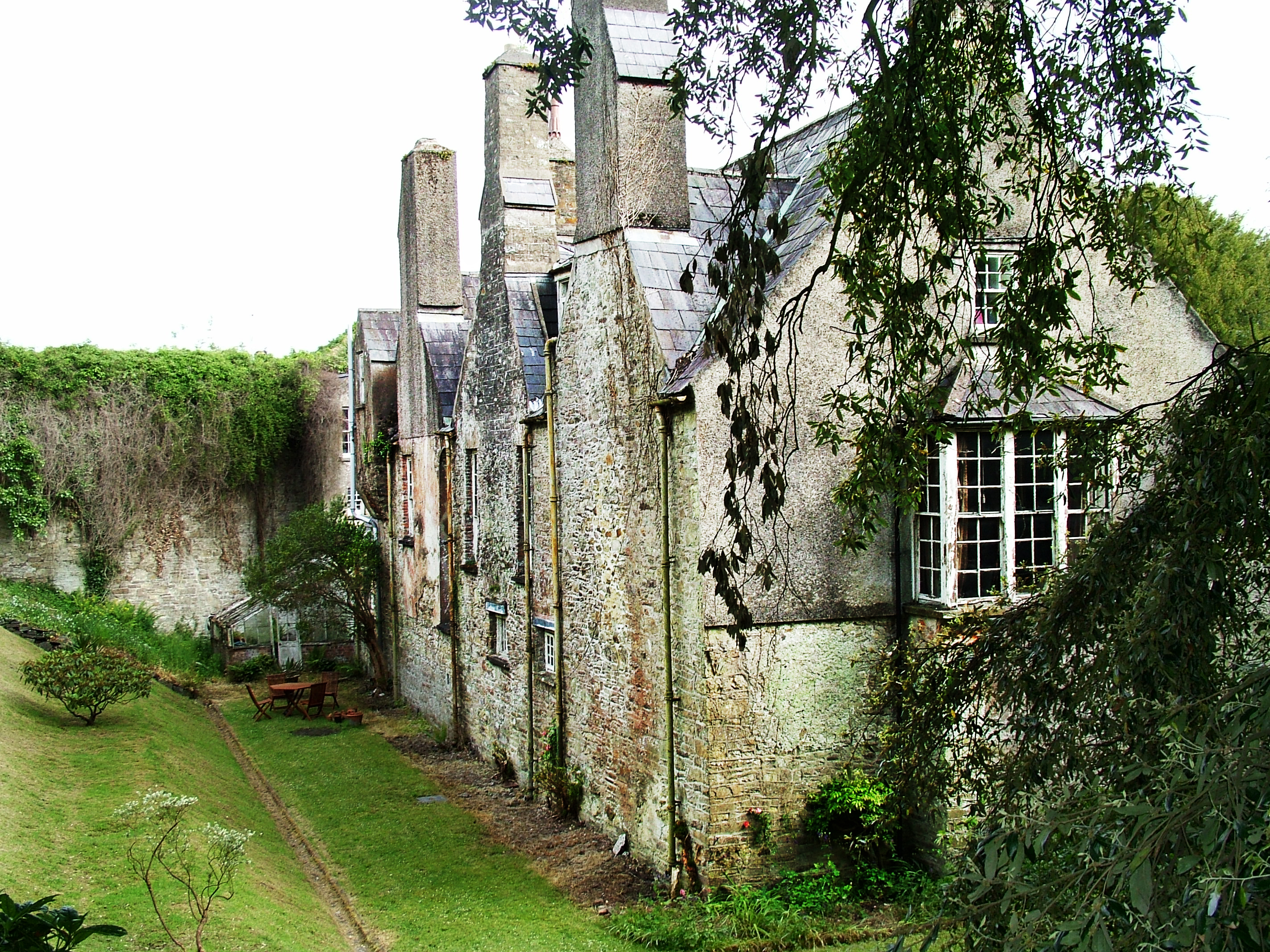
Myrtle Grove

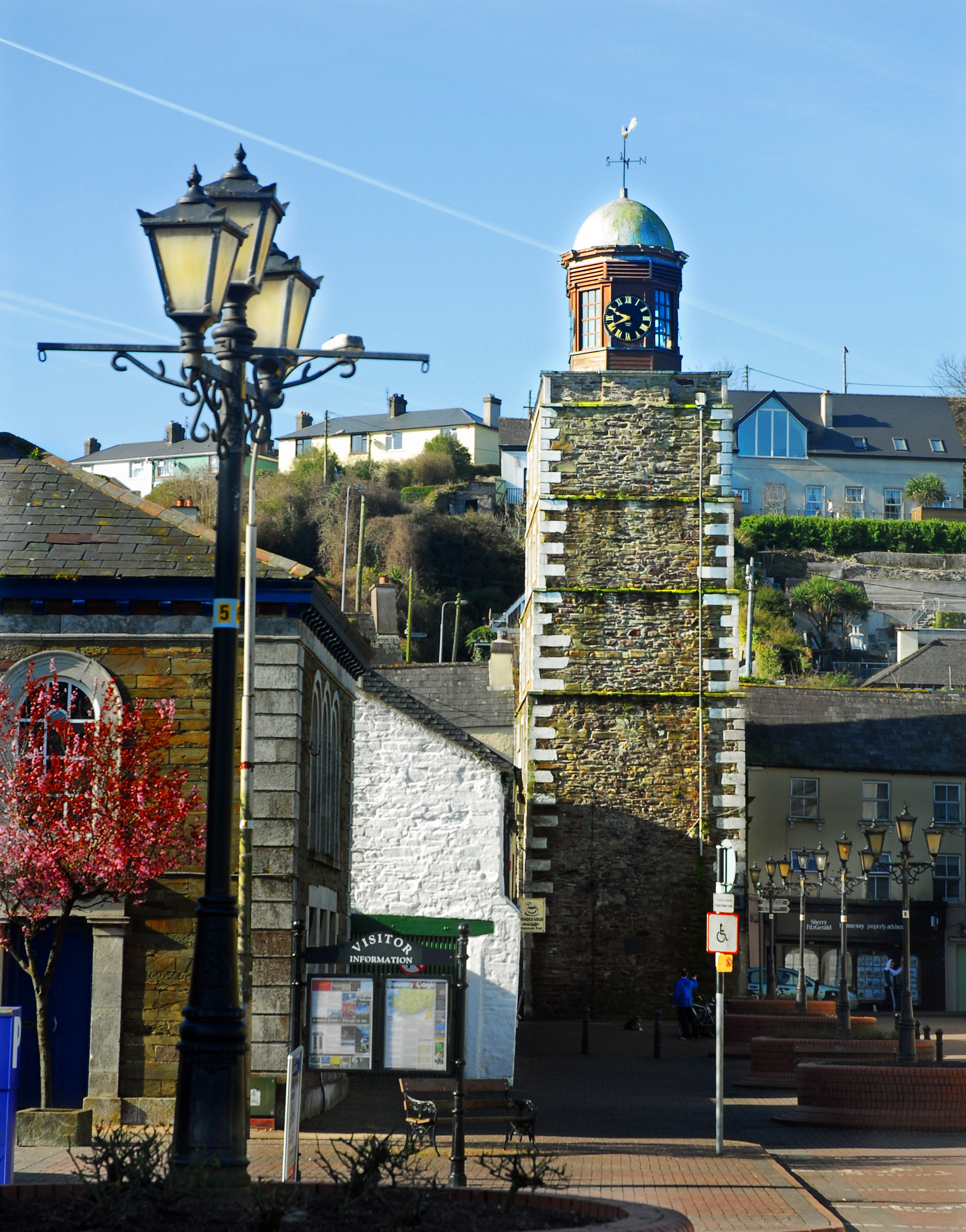
Clock Gate from Barry's Lane

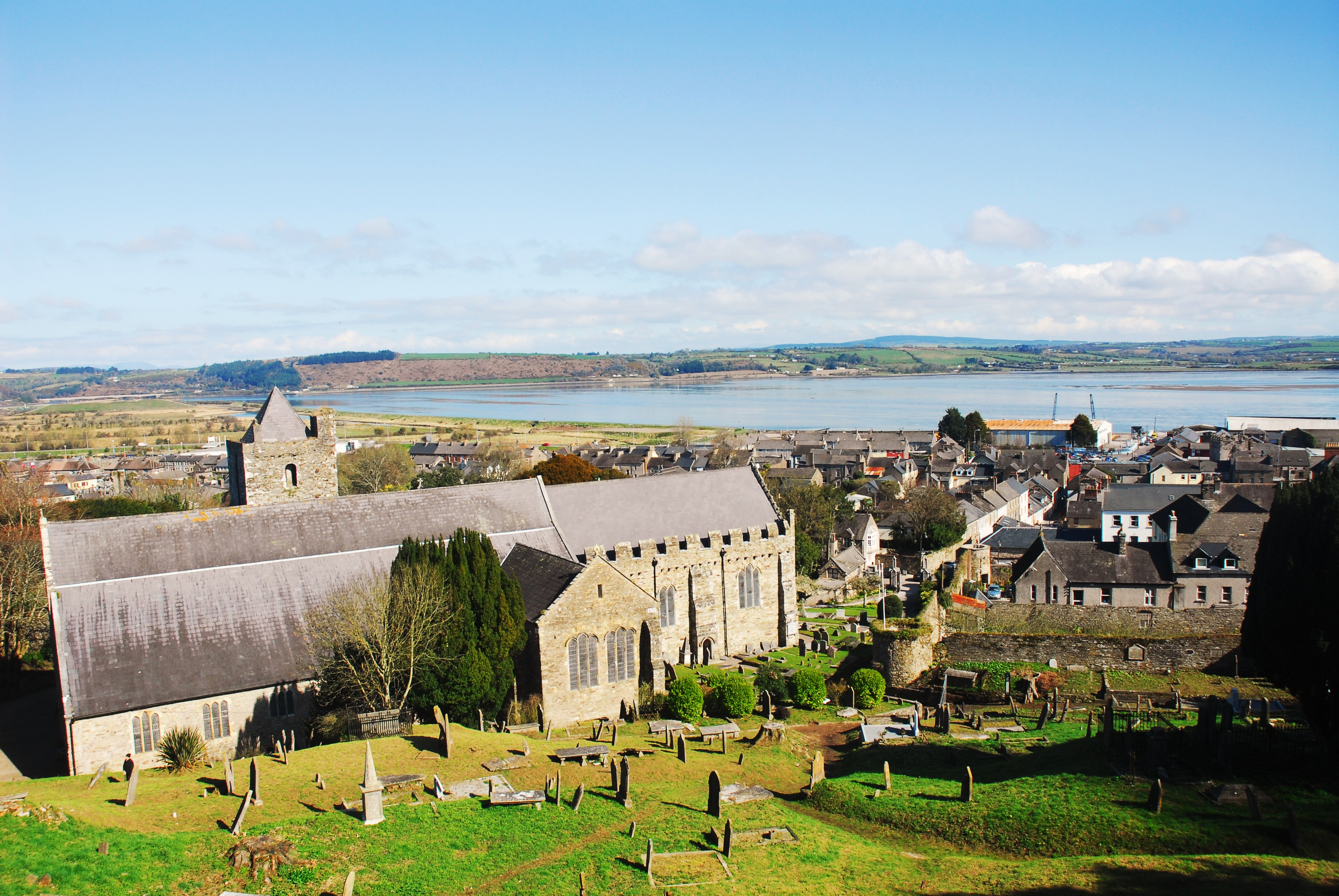
Youghal from above St Marys Collegiate Church

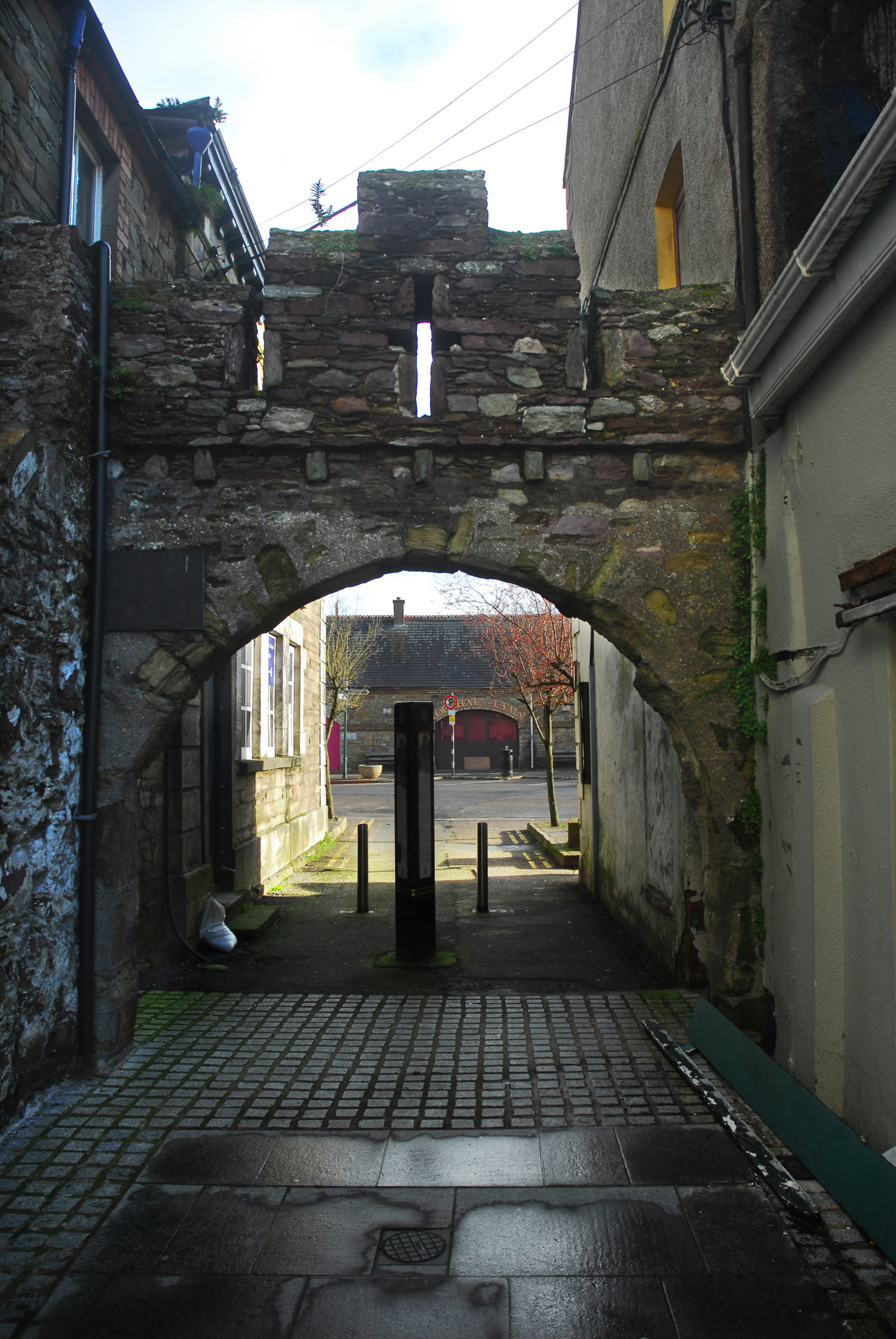
The Water Gate, also known as Cromwell's Arch

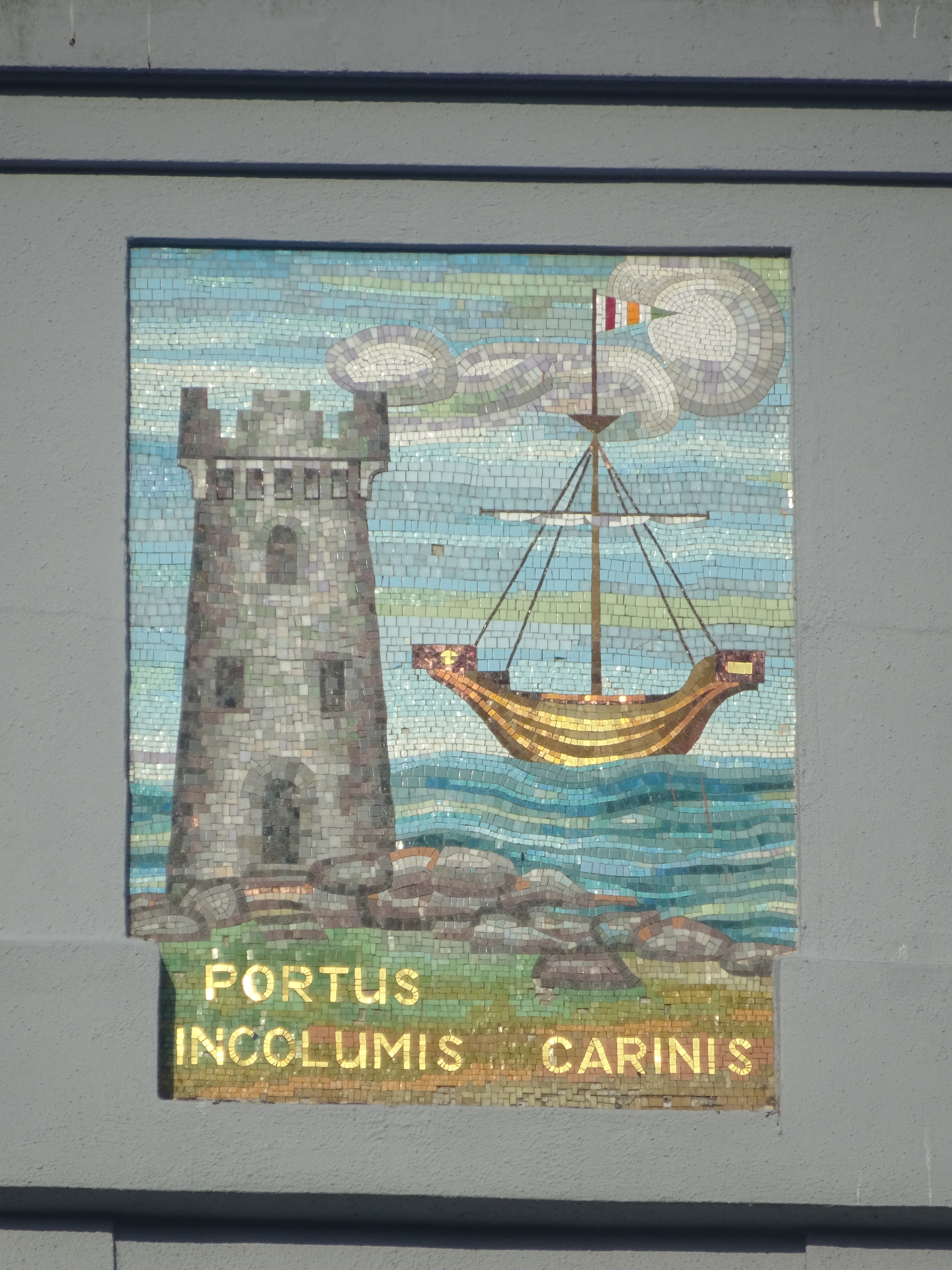
Youghal town arms mosaic

== See also ==
- Youghal lace
- Youghal (Parliament of Ireland constituency)
- List of towns and villages in Ireland
- Market Houses in Ireland
- North Abbey, Youghal
- South Abbey, Youghal
- Strancally Castle
