= Red House (Youghal) =

Red House, Youghal
- An Teach Dearg
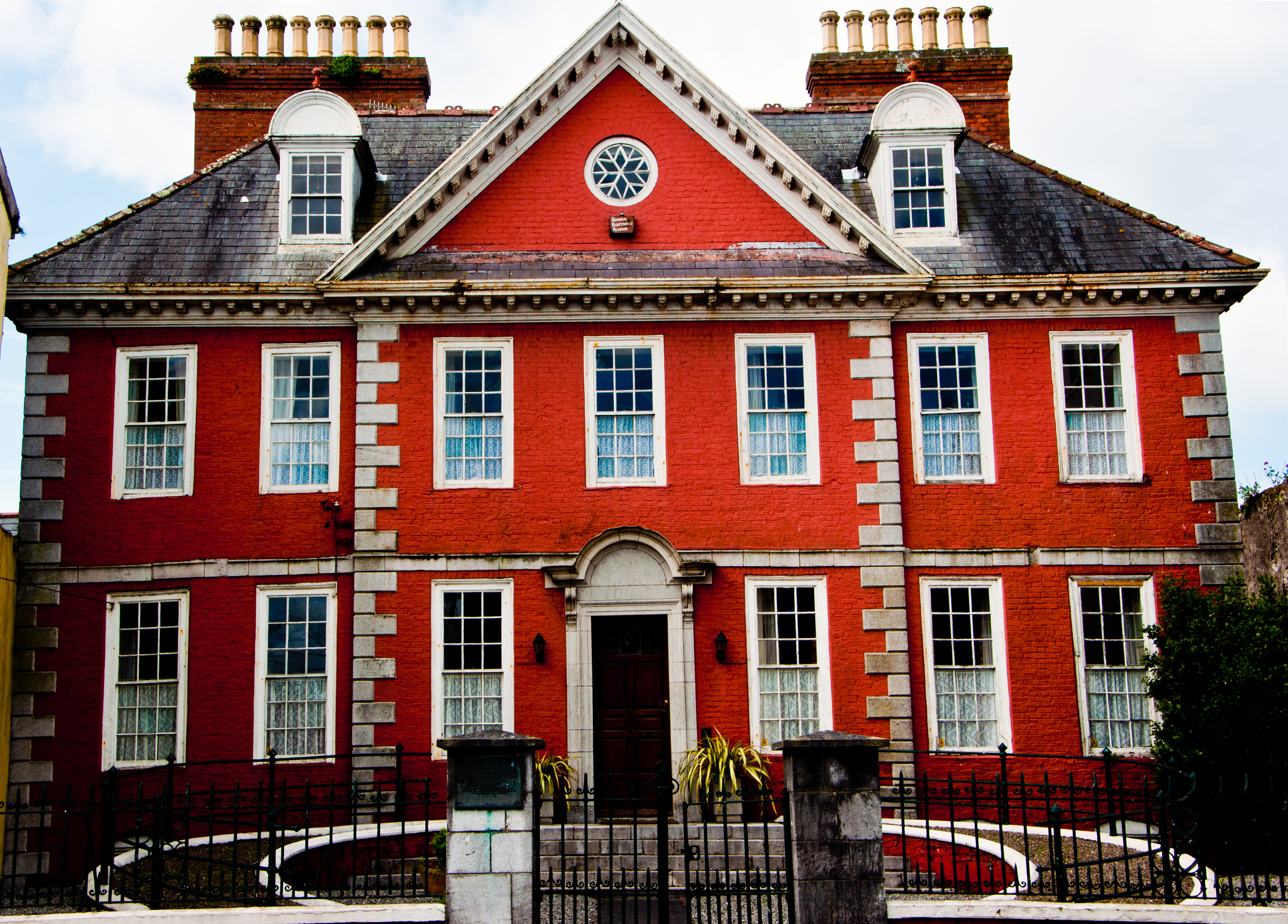

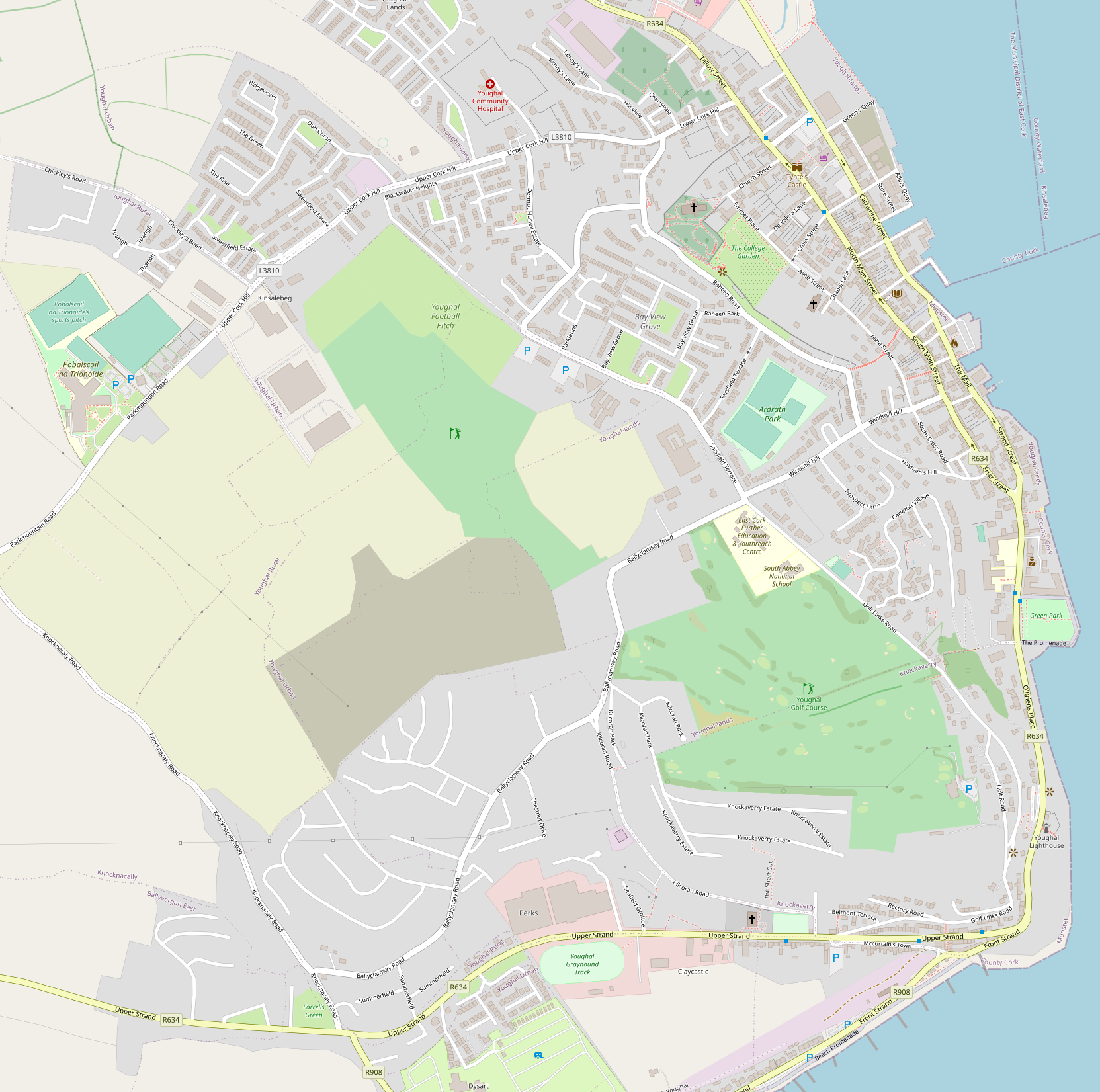
- Location within Youghal Location within Ireland

General information
- Type: House
- Architectural style: William and Mary, Dutch, Queen Anne
- Classification: Protected structure
- Location: North Main Street, Youghal, Ireland
- Coordinates: 51°57′20″N 7°51′01″W
- Elevation: 5 m (16 ft)
- Named for: terracotta bricks used in original construction
- Groundbreaking: c. 1703

Technical details
- Floor count: 4
- Floor area: 6,818 sq ft (633.4 m^{2})

Design and construction
- Architect: Claud Leuventhen

The Red House is an 18th-century William and Mary style house located in Youghal, Ireland.

== Location ==
The Red House is located on Youghal's main street, about 200 m (220 yd) east of Myrtle Grove and St. Mary's Collegiate Church.

== History ==
The Red House was built c. 1703–1710 and designed by the Dutch architect Claud Leuventhen for the wealthy Uniacke family. The name derives from the terracotta bricks used, then a novelty in Ireland. Another unusual feature of the period is the lack of windowsills and the pewter pelmets. It originally had two wings; one is now converted into the Imperial Hotel.

Thomas Farrell, a Justice of the Peace, owned the Red House in the early 20th century; he bought a conservatory at the 1900 Paris Exposition, which blew away in the 1930s. Claud Cockburn and Patricia Cockburn were regular visitors.

The house later was a parochial house and stained glass was added. In 1980 it was bought by Eamonn Keane of Fáilte Ireland; he and his wife renovated the house in the 1980s.

== Description ==
The Red House is a four-storey, seven-bay William and Mary style townhouse with seven bedrooms and a terrazzo, with original Wainscoting in the walls. The National Inventory of Architectural Heritage says that "The design of the building is distinctly Dutch, considering features such as the gentle breakfront, central pediment, and steeply pitched roof with dormer windows. The carved limestone dressings are particularly notable as fine examples of eighteenth-century skilled craftsmanship. This house is a rare and fine example of early eighteenth-century urban architecture to remain in its original form."

== See also ==
- Beaulieu House and Gardens
