= Youghal Town Hall =

Municipal building in Youghal, County Cork, Ireland

- Halla an Bhaile Eochaill
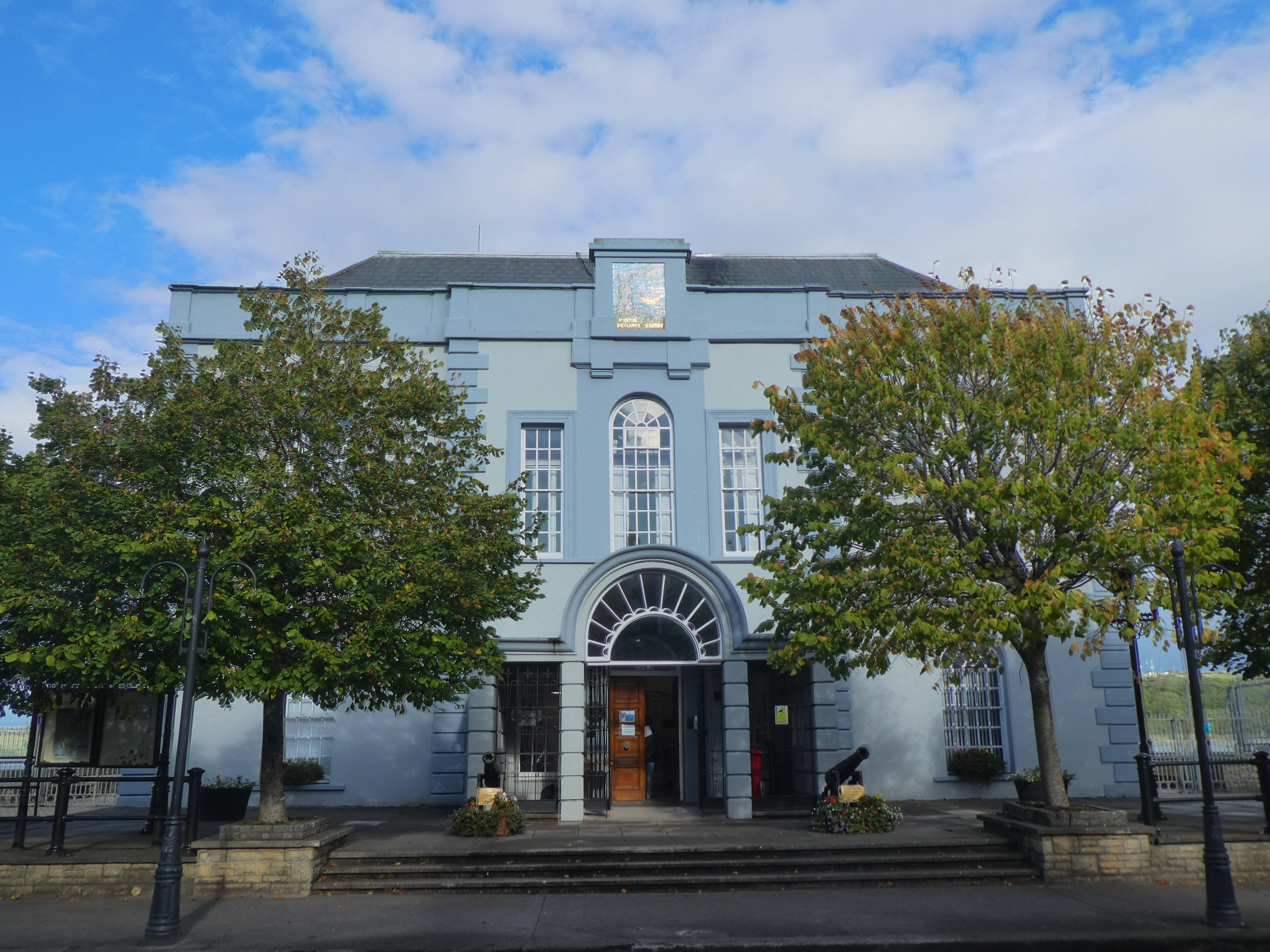
- Youghal Town Hall

- Location within County Cork
- Former names: Mall House

General information
- Architectural style: Italianate style
- Location: The Mall, Youghal, Ireland
- Coordinates: 51.9517°N 7.8443°W
- Completed: 1779

Youghal Town Hall (Irish: Halla an Bhaile Eochaill), also known as The Mall House, Youghal, is a municipal building in The Mall, Youghal, County Cork, Ireland. The building accommodates an entertainment venue known as The Mall Arts Centre. It is included in Cork County Council's Record of Protected Structures.

== History ==
The building was commissioned to replace an early 17th century tholsel, as the assembly rooms and courthouse for the town. It was designed in the Italianate style, built in brick with a cement render finish and opened as the "New Rooms" in 1779.

Around the same time, in 1774, William Meade was superintending the construction of the Mall and it is proposed that he may also have completed the town hall as well as several other buildings in the town.

The design involved a symmetrical main frontage of three bays facing onto The Mall. The central bay, which was slightly projected forward, featured a rounded headed doorway with a fanlight flanked by two sash windows; there was a Venetian window on the first floor. The outer bays were fenestrated by rounded headed windows with window sills on the ground floor, and by rounded headed windows with moulded surrounds on the first floor. There were quoins at the corners and, at roof level, there was a cornice and a parapet which was broken by a central square-shaped pediment, containing the coat of arms of the town supported by a pair of pedestals. The building was used as the borough courthouse until Youghal Corporation was abolished under the Municipal Corporations (Ireland) Act 1840.

The area around the building was the scene of food riots, with protestors unsuccessfully seeking to prevent crops being loaded onto ships, in 1846 during the Great Famine. The building was altered to accommodate the offices of the newly-formed town commissioners in the mid-19th century, and it became the offices and meeting place of Youghal Urban District Council when it was formed in 1900. It served as the costume department during the filming of Moby Dick starring Gregory Peck, which was shot in the town in 1954, and a distinctive barrel vaulted porch, with a round headed opening flanked by two smaller openings, was added in the 1970s.

The building continued to be used as the offices of the urban district council until 2002, and then as the offices of the successor town council. Two 17th century smoothbore muzzle-loading cannons, recovered from an artillery battery which had once defended the town walls, were restored at a cost of €20,000 and installed in front of the building in 2008. The building ceased to be the local seat of government in 2014, when the council was dissolved and administration of the town was amalgamated with Cork County Council in accordance with the Local Government Reform Act 2014. An extensive programme of refurbishment works, which involved the conversion of much of the building into an arts centre and the construction of a new glazed extension at the rear, was carried out to a design by Wilson Architecture and completed in April 2015.
