= William and Mary style =

Furniture design

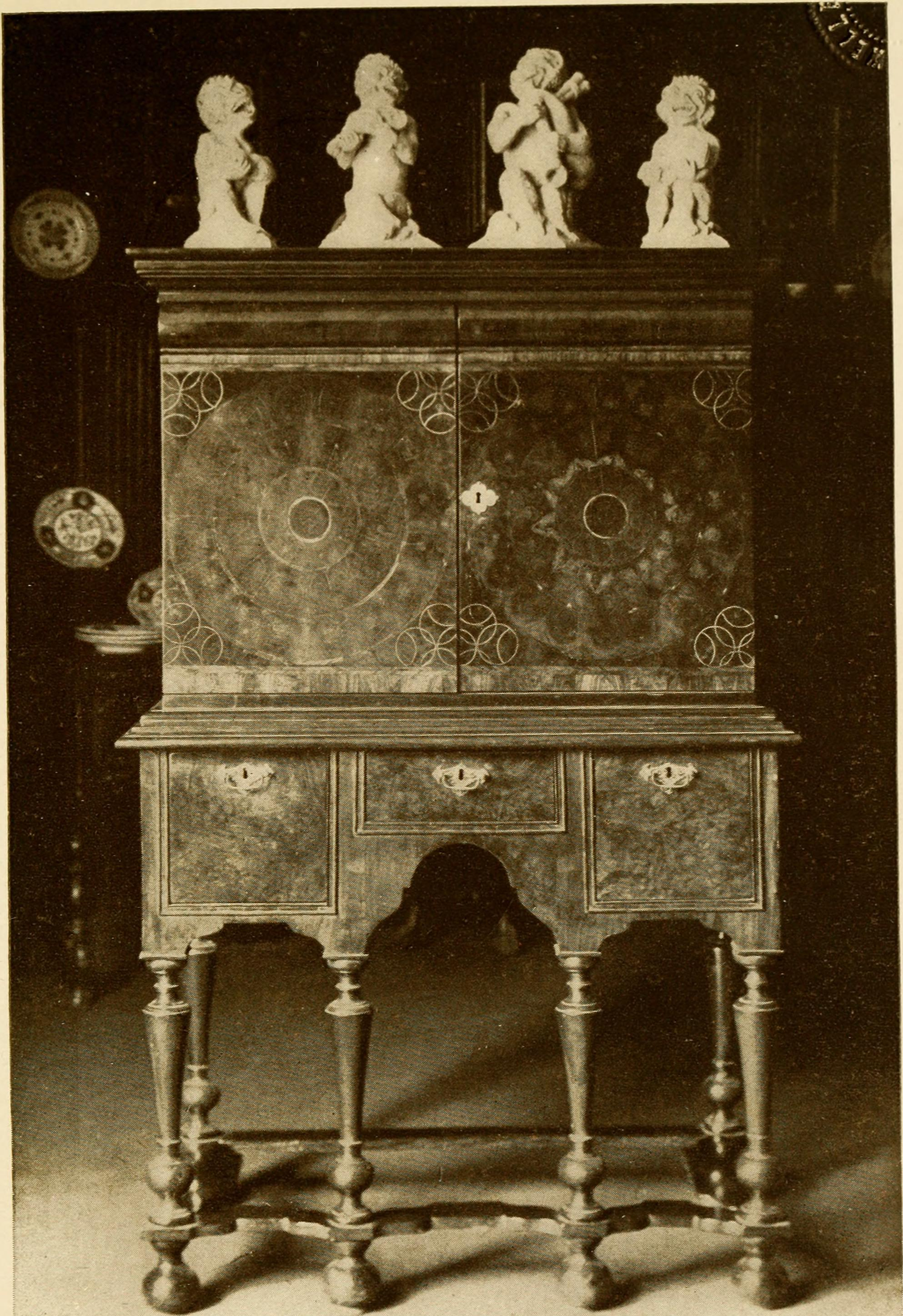
A William and Mary style cabinet with oyster veneering and parquetry inlays

What later came to be known as the William and Mary style is a furniture design common from 1700 to 1725 in the Netherlands, Kingdom of England, Kingdom of Scotland and Kingdom of Ireland, and later in England's American colonies. It was a transitional style between Mannerist furniture and Queen Anne furniture. Sturdy, emphasizing both straight lines and curves, and featuring elaborate carving and woodturning, the style was one of the first to imitate Asian design elements such as japanning.

== About the design ==
In 1688, James II of England was deposed by his daughter, Mary, and her husband, William of Orange, in what came to be known as the "Glorious Revolution". From his birth in 1650, William had reigned over five provinces of the Dutch Republic, and Mary had lived in the Netherlands with him after their marriage in 1677. William and Mary brought to their kingdoms a taste for Dutch furniture styles, as well as a number of Dutch furniture-makers. Although movement toward what would come to be called the William and Mary style had begun during the reign of Charles II of England, primarily due to the influence of his Portuguese-born queen, Catherine of Braganza, the style became defined and widely accepted during the reigns of William (d. 1702) and Mary (d. 1694), initially jointly and then, after Mary's death, of William alone.

The William and Mary style was influenced by recent French furniture traditions, which in turn were influenced by Italian Baroque furniture designs. William and Mary style furniture emphasized unity, so that all elements contributed to an overall shape or look. It also featured high relief carving, strong curves, (Note: Known as "Flemish curves".) and elaborate woodturning. Despite these elements, the style was fairly squat, heavy-looking, and obviously sturdy. Straight lines are common. Paint, stains, or different kind of wood were used to create contrasting colors, which was another element of this style. Japanning, a technique of varnishing which was very popular at the time, was also used on this furniture design. For chairs, woven cane seats and heavily scrolled backs predominated. Toward the end of the style, cane-woven seats and backs had given way to leather, and straight or slightly angled backs had given way to serpentine forms.

Other decorative arts such as architecture, ceramics, silver, and textiles could also feature elements of the William and Mary style. The design movement had an extremely positive impact on the craftsmanship and quality of British furniture.

The William and Mary style was a transitional style between Mannerist and Queen Anne furniture. The William and Mary style was very popular in Britain from 1700 to 1725, and in America until about 1735. It was largely supplanted in both nations by Queen Anne style furniture.

=== English variations ===
Daniel Marot, a French Huguenot, was employed by King William and Queen Mary to design furniture for them, and became deeply influential on English, Scottish, and Welsh furniture during this period. Dutch furniture craftsman Gerrit Jensen was appointed royal Cabinet Maker to the king and queen, and a great many works of his design were sold to wealthy British citizens of the day.

In Britain, case furniture (Note: Case furniture is any kind of furniture that suggests a box. Typical case furniture includes bureaus, cabinetry, chests, cupboards, desks, and sideboards.) in the William and Mary style tended to feature simple flat surfaces but exquisitely carved trim. Provincial furniture-makers in Britain moved away from the woven cane seat, and developed the leather-covered wooden seat as a vernacular design. Split spindles also came into use, first rurally and then in urban areas.

The daybed was developed in Britain as part of the William and Mary style. So, too, was the writing desk, which was an adaptation of the bureau-cabinet. (Note: The bureau-cabinet consisted of a chest of drawers atop which was a smaller set of shelves, pigeon-holes, and drawers set back from the front. A panel covered these drawers at an angle; when pulled forward and down, the panel served as a writing space. Atop the second set of drawers was a much taller third set of drawers, usually concealed behind two doors.)

=== American variations ===
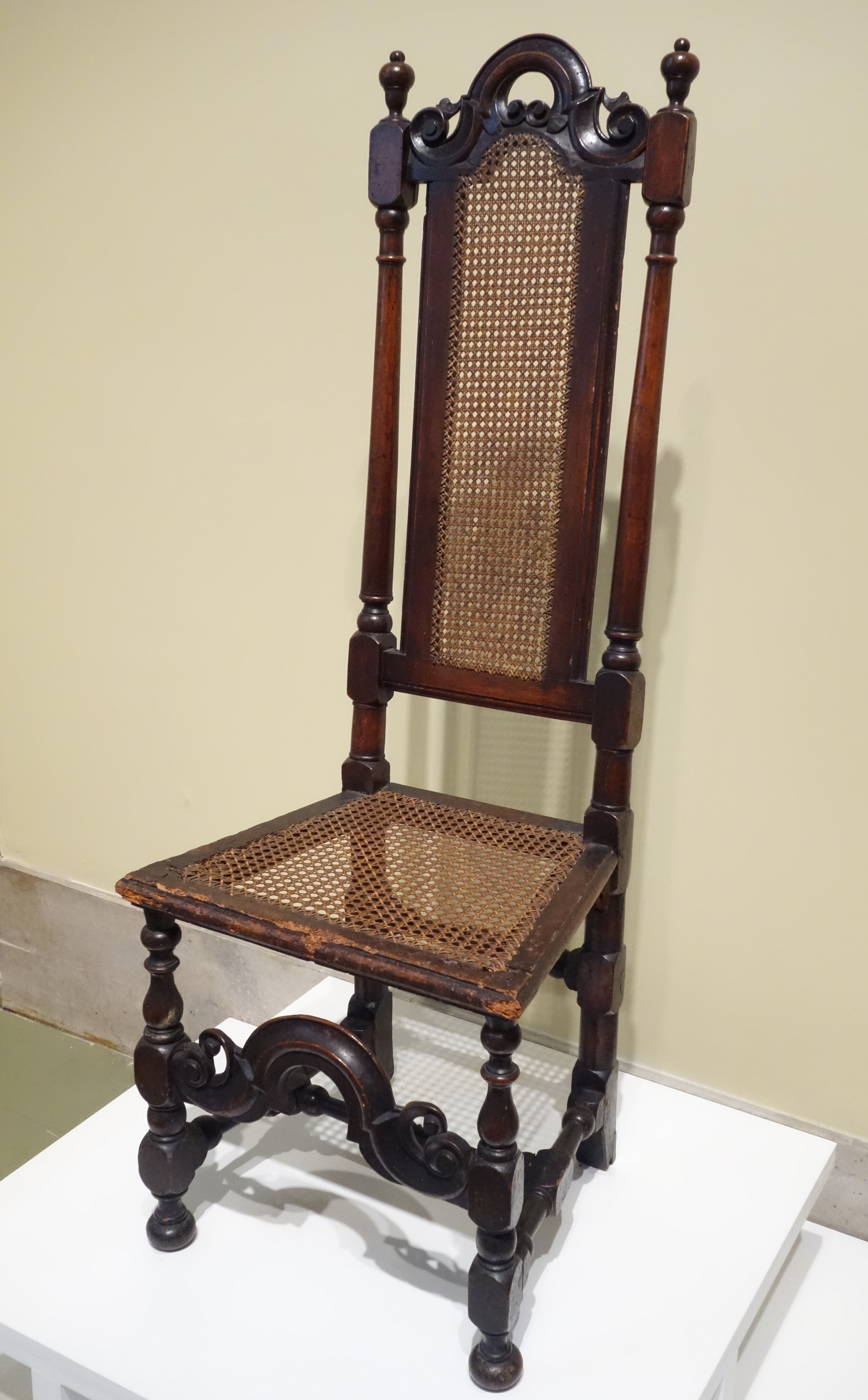
A William and Mary style chair made in America.

American craftsmen working in the William and Mary style favored a tapered scroll foot for their designs. Walnut and, to a lesser extent, maple were the preferred woods, with walnut burl veneers and "ebonization" (black japanning) common.

Over time, American forms of William and Mary furniture became simplified. Although the Baroque influence was still seen in the crests, feet, and scrolls, other elements and the overall look of pieces began to shed this influence in favor of plain but strong curves. American chairmakers began using woven cane in the splats of chairs as well. For armchairs, American designers favored seats and splats covered in leather, attached with brass nails. In parts of America like New York and New Jersey, which had a heavy Dutch cultural influence, the kast became popular. The kast was of Dutch origin, and featured a large drawer in the base unit. Atop the base were shelves concealed behind one or two heavy doors. An elaborate cornice usually ran along the upper edges. Influenced by the William and Mary style, the American kast featured removable feet, simplified the cornice, and eliminated the intricate inlays favored by the Dutch.

The "Boston chair" became one of the best-known examples of a William and Mary style chair made in America. This spoon-back chair (Note: The spoon-back chair features a back which curves slightly inward and then outward as it rises. The serpentine form looks like the curvature of a spoon handle, hence the name.) with leather-covered seat and splat featured turned front legs and a turned stretcher between them. The side and rear stretchers as well as the rear legs, however, were undecorated straight lines. The corners of the frame around the splat were usually rounded down (although not turned), and the crest was a simplified geometric or curving design. They were usually painted black or red. Made primarily in Boston, Massachusetts, these chairs were manufactured in large numbers and very popular in America. They were also widely exported to Britain. Benches and settees manufactured in America were less influenced by the William and Mary style. Panels, developed in the 1600s, were used for the seat, back, and (where used) arms, with trim and legs reflecting the new style. Leather seats were, however, sometimes added.

Another innovation was the highboy. Essentially two chests of drawers, the lower slightly larger than the upper, American highboys often featured Solomonic or trumpet-shaped legs. It was somewhat common for the faces of the drawers to have a walnut burl veneer.

The William and Mary style lasted past the mid-1700s in rural America, often incorporating both Mannerist and Queen Anne styles. Slats began to be used in backs, and yoke-shaped crests became common.

== Modern popularity ==
The William and Mary style has long been overshadowed in both the United Kingdom and United States by the far more popular styles which came after it. Few reproductions of the furniture may be found today. However, numerous examples of William and Mary style furniture can still widely be found in British rural homes.

== Bibliography ==
- Butler, Joseph T.; Johnson, Kathleen Eagen; Skibinski, Ray (1985). Field Guide to American Antique Furniture. New York: Henry Holt. ISBN 9780805001242.
- Campbell, Gordon (2006). The Grove Encyclopedia of Decorative Arts. Oxford, U.K.: Oxford University Press. ISBN 9780195189483.
- Davidson, Marshall B.; Stillinger, Elizabeth (1985). The American Wing at the Metropolitan Museum of Art. New York: Metropolitan Museum of Art. ISBN 9780870993091.
- Dillinger, Zachary (2016). With Saw, Plane and Chisel: Building Historic American Furniture With Hand Tools. Cincinnati: Popular Woodworking Books. ISBN 9781440343414.
- Gura, Judith (2016). The Guide to Period Styles for Interiors: From the 17th Century to the Present. New York: Bloomsbury. ISBN 9781628924718.
- Thiel, David (2015). "Beginning Principles". In Francis, David (ed.). Woodworking Essentials: Best Practices and Timeless Techniques for Woodworkers. Cincinnati: F&W Media. ISBN 9781440343704.
- Turner, Jane, ed. (2000). "William and Mary style". The Grove Dictionary of Art: From Renaissance to Impressionism: Styles and Movements in Western Art, 1400-1900. New York: St. Martin's Press. ISBN 9780312229757.
