= Duck foot =

Duck foot or duck's foot may refer to:

- Duck foot, alternative name for club foot (furniture)
- Duck foot, a version of the French technique used in climbing snow slopes
- Duck's foot, type of 19th-century volley gun
