= Paw feet =

Furniture legs resembling animal feet

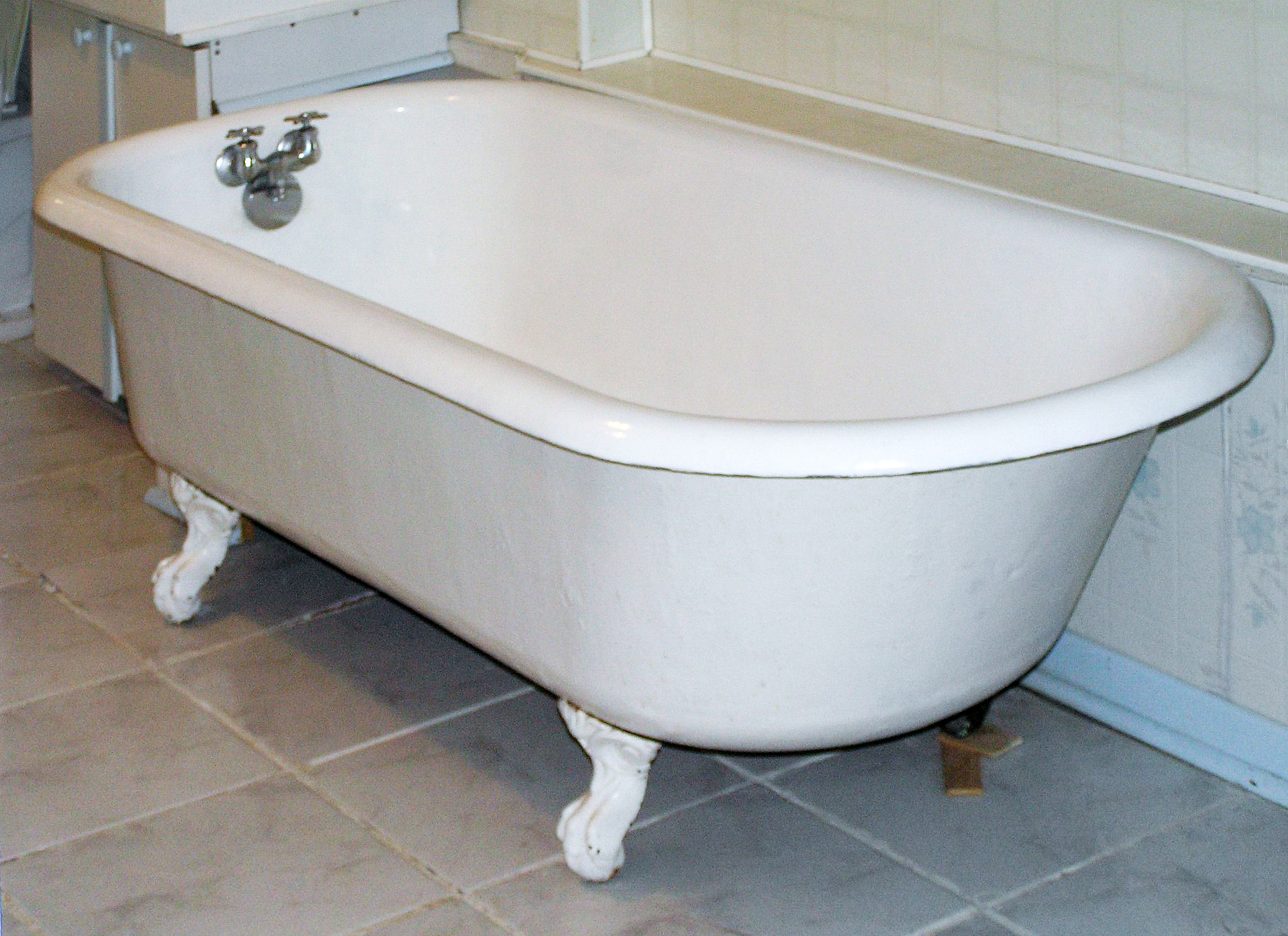
Paw feet on bathtub

Paw feet or claw feet are ornamental animal like feet attached to furniture making and design. It describes the terminals on the legs of furniture that resemble the feet of animals. Lions and dogs are two of the most popular types. It was used from ancient times through the Renaissance. Paw feet could be found on anything from tables to chests. Today it is common to see paw feet on faux antique bathtubs.

== See also ==
- Foot (furniture)
