= Nursing chair =

Type of chair for breastfeeding

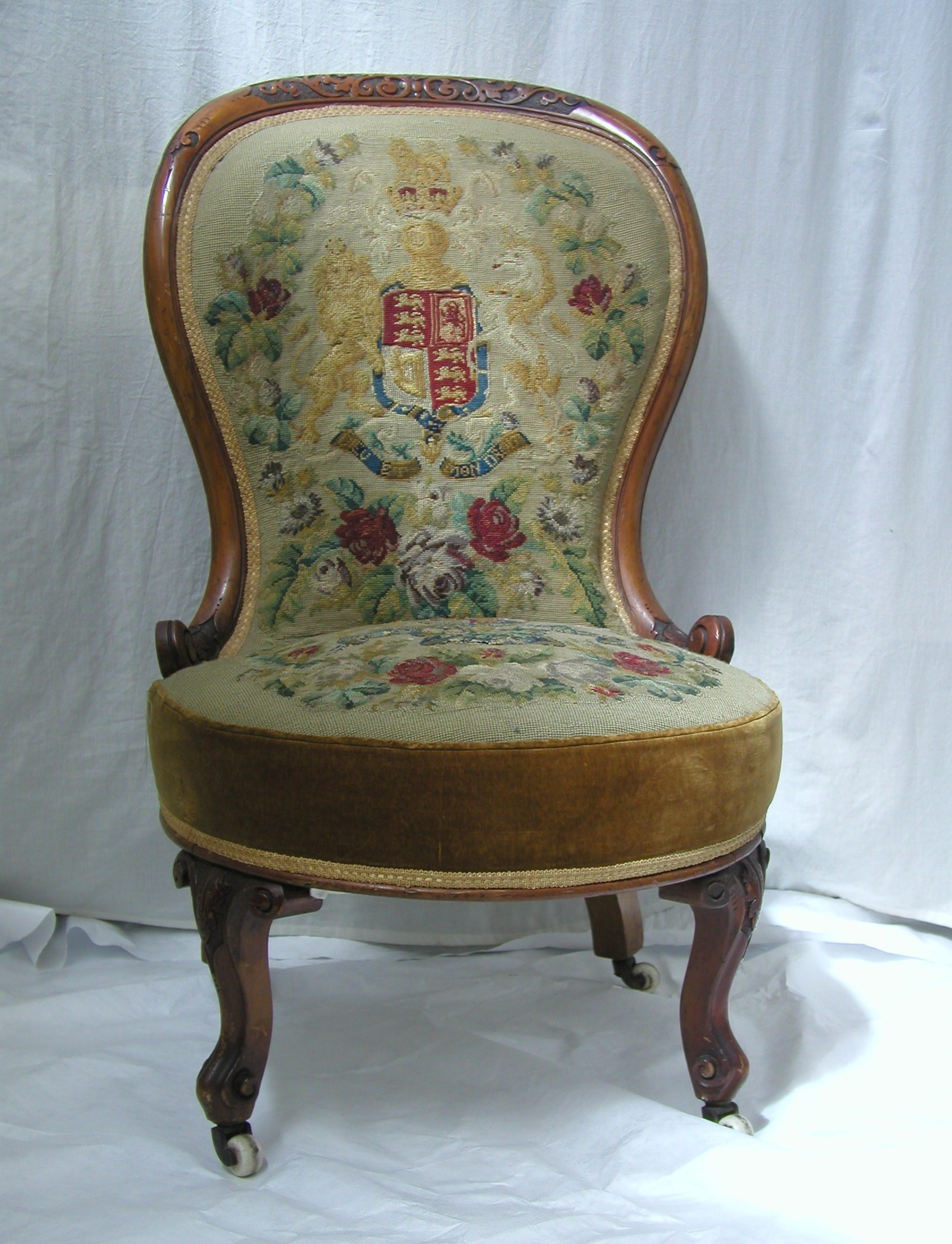
19th century nursing chair held in the Auckland War Memorial Museum

A nursing chair is a chair that's comfortable when nursing an infant. It differs from a rocking chair in that it does not have rockers, but rather four stationary legs.

== History ==
Nursing included caring for children as well as breastfeeding. The low seat of the chair allowed the mother to interact with small children without bending over, with early examples dating from the 1500s. The chairs became more popular during the Victorian era when mothers would have been wearing stiff corsets. In Victorian times the nursing chair was a low seated partially upholstered chair. Generally these were upholstered using a single piece of fabric.

This chair form was particularly popular in England and found primarily in upper class homes. The types of wood most frequently used were oak, rosewood or walnut. The seat was often sprung and could be button decorated or adorned with a circumferential braid or pair of braids. Simpler, wooden examples have been found in Ireland, possibly used by middle class women. The chair legs were frequently of a cabriole style or a straight-legged spindle design, and on occasion had "Crookt feet" [sic].

Large furniture manufacturers, such as Lloyd Loom, produced such nursing chairs, and continue to produce similar chairs but with arms to make them suitable for other uses. More modern nursing chairs exist in a wider variety; either rocking chairs, recliners or gliders. They can be accompanied by ottomans.
