= Club foot (furniture) =

Type of rounded foot for furniture

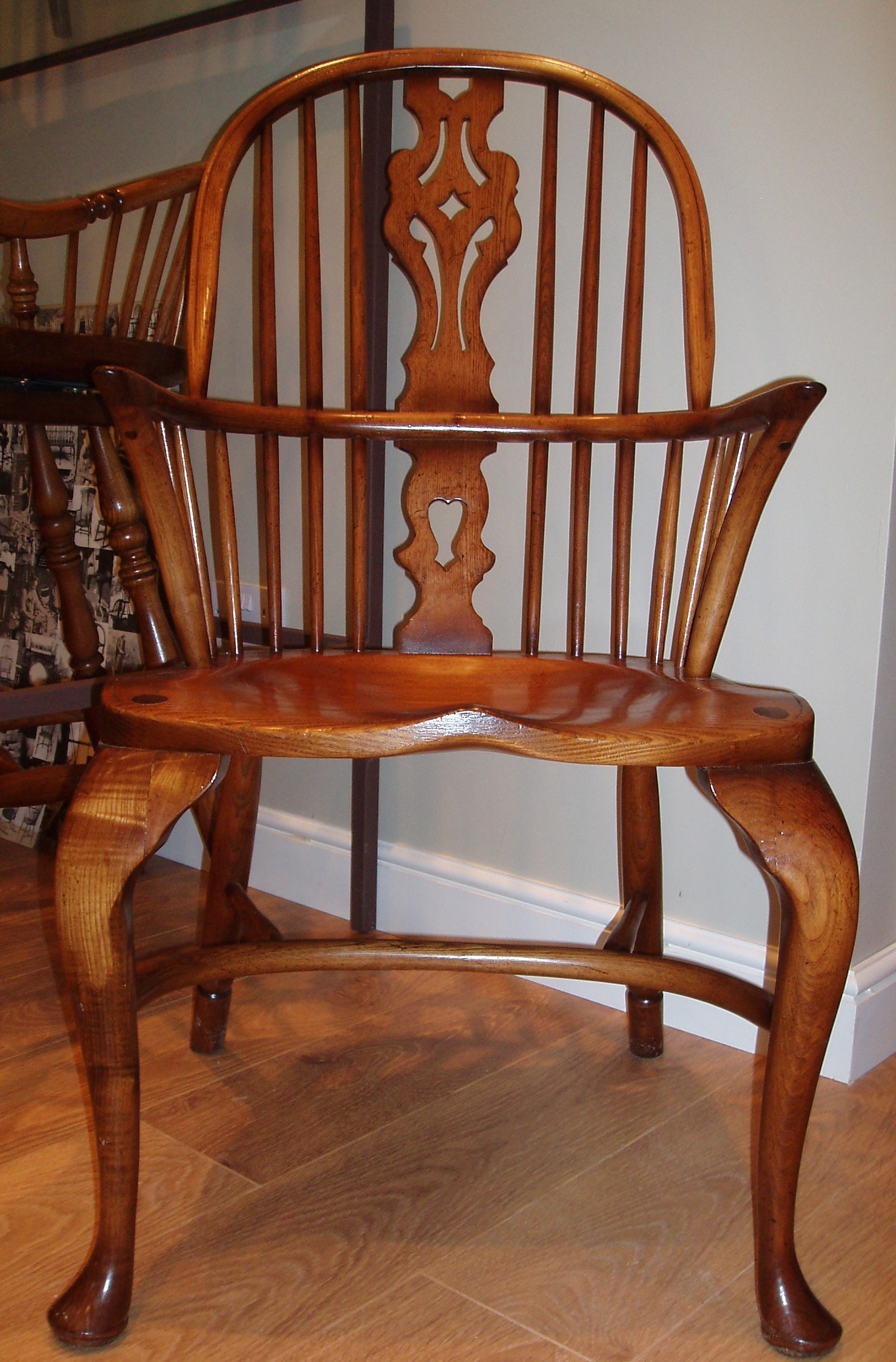
A Windsor Georgian Double Bow chair with pad-footed cabriole legs at the front. The back legs are plain.

A club foot is a type of rounded foot for a piece of furniture, such as the end of a chair leg. It is also known by the alternative names pad foot and Dutch foot, the latter sometimes corrupted into duck foot.

Such feet are rounded flat pads or disks at the end of furniture legs. Pad feet were regularly used on cabriole legs during the 18th century. They can be found on tables, chairs, and some early sofas.

Pad feet were first seen in the French and Italian Renaissance periods and have been widely used ever since. Pad feet can still be seen on some classical furniture.

== See also ==
- Foot (furniture)
