= Cabriole leg =

Vertical support of a piece of furniture, shaped in two curves

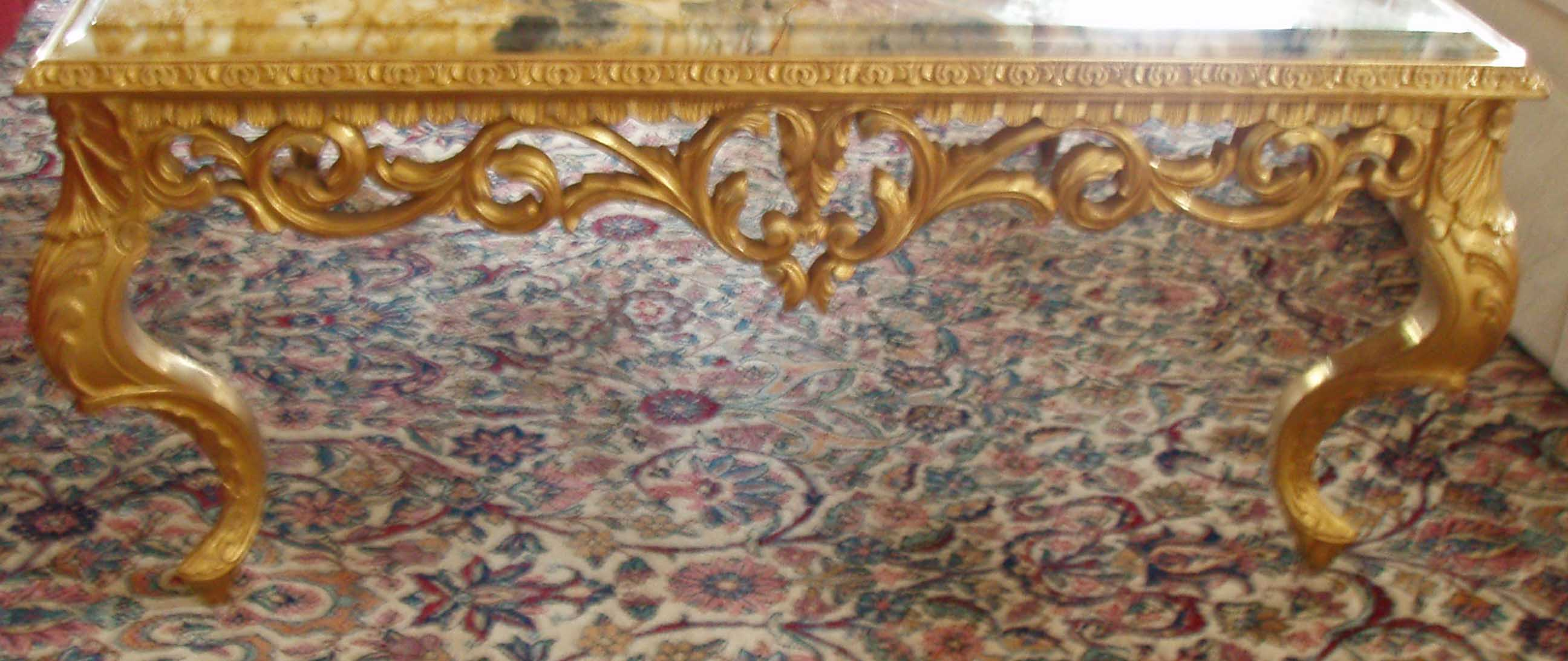
Cabriole legged marble topped table.

A cabriole leg is one of (usually) four vertical supports of a piece of furniture shaped in two curves; the upper arc is convex, while lower is concave; the upper curve always bows outward, while the lower curve bows inward; with the axes of the two curves in the same plane. This design was used by the ancient Chinese and Greeks, but emerged in Europe in the very early 18th century, when it was incorporated into the more curvilinear styles produced in France, England and Holland.

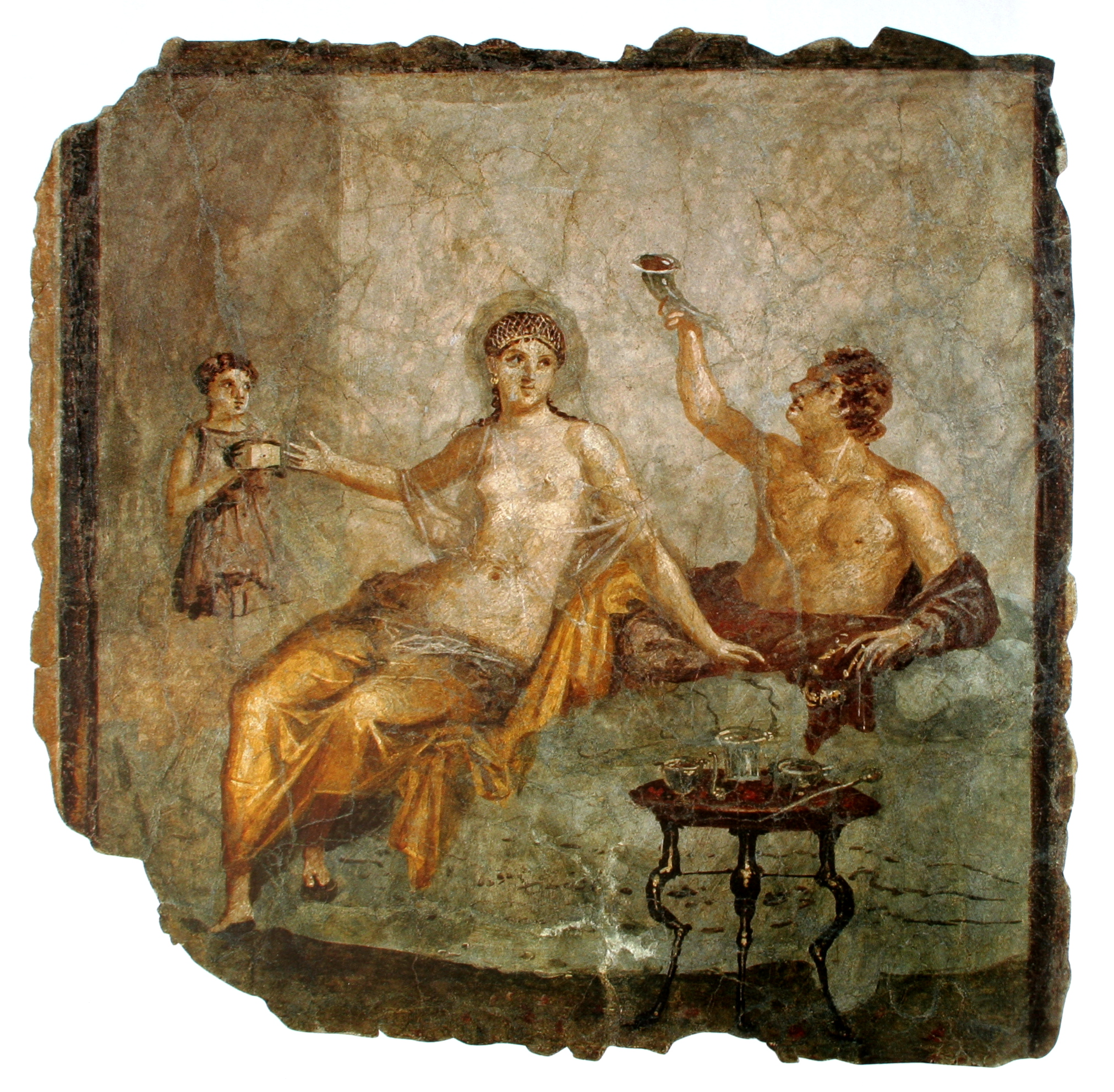
Cabriole legged table Herculaneum Italy in the first century

According to Bird, "nothing symbolises 18th century furniture more than the cabriole leg." The cabriole design is often associated with bun or the "ball and claw" foot design. In England, this design was characteristic of Queen Anne and Chippendale furniture. In France, the cabriole leg is associated with the Louis XV period of furniture design. The cabriole design appeared for the first time in the United States in the 18th century. The basis of its original concept was emulated upon legs of certain four-footed mammals, especially ungulates. The etymology of this term specifically derives from the French word cabrioler, meaning to leap like a goat.

== History ==
This leg style has been used continuously in China, where it is associated with lacquered tables. The cabriole leg, lost to Europe sometime before the Middle Ages, returned to use first in France in Rococo style around the year 1700, imitating a popular graphic scroll design found in contemporary French art. The cabriole leg returned in England in Queen Anne Style chairs between 1712 and 1760. These chairs featured a back with hoop design, a vase-shaped splat, and a bun or pad foot. Another English design from the period follows Chinese style, with a flat cresting and vertical back edges. The later advent of Chippendale furniture saw the English cabriole leg develop a more delicate form.

Cabriole legs first appeared in American design in the mid-18th century, initially imitating Queen Anne Style with a juxtaposition of elements from the Queen Anne subperiod (1702–1714), George I subperiod (1714–1727) and George II subperiod (1727–1760). The cabriole leg, later primarily seen in pad foot design, became almost universal in American furniture design, leading some to name this the cabriole period. Later in the century, regional differences emerged: for example, the Commonwealth of Massachusetts style features a much more slender leg.

== Construction ==
In current times the cabriole leg continues in use and more modern manufacturing techniques are applied to form this complex shape. In any case, the initial step is preparation of a template drawn on hardboard or cardboard. Structurally, the cabriole leg is weaker as the "S" shape is more accentuated or "bowed"; in any case the cabriole leg must be fashioned out of a solid piece of wood, rather than laminate. Some of the initial rough turning is sometimes carried out using a lathe, but eventually a bandsaw is required due to the complex arc formations of the design. The next steps include application of a spokeshave, rasp and scraper. The bottom of the leg may terminate in a bun, ball or "ball and claw" rendition; Queen Anne style furniture characteristically uses the bun foot (also called pad foot). The small brackets are constructed from a separate piece of wood and either affixed by dowels or screws.

== Examples in notable collections ==
The antique furniture collection of Henry Cavendish contains a set of "ten inlaid cabriole leg satinwood chairs with matching cabriole legged sofa" documented to have been acquired by Cavendish himself. Another example is manifested in a cherry candlestand deriving from Gloucester with cabriole legs, described by the Essex Institute as produced between 1725 and 1750; moreover, this specimen is notable for the early design of dovetailed attachment of the legs as opposed to dowelled attachment of later eras.

== Gallery ==
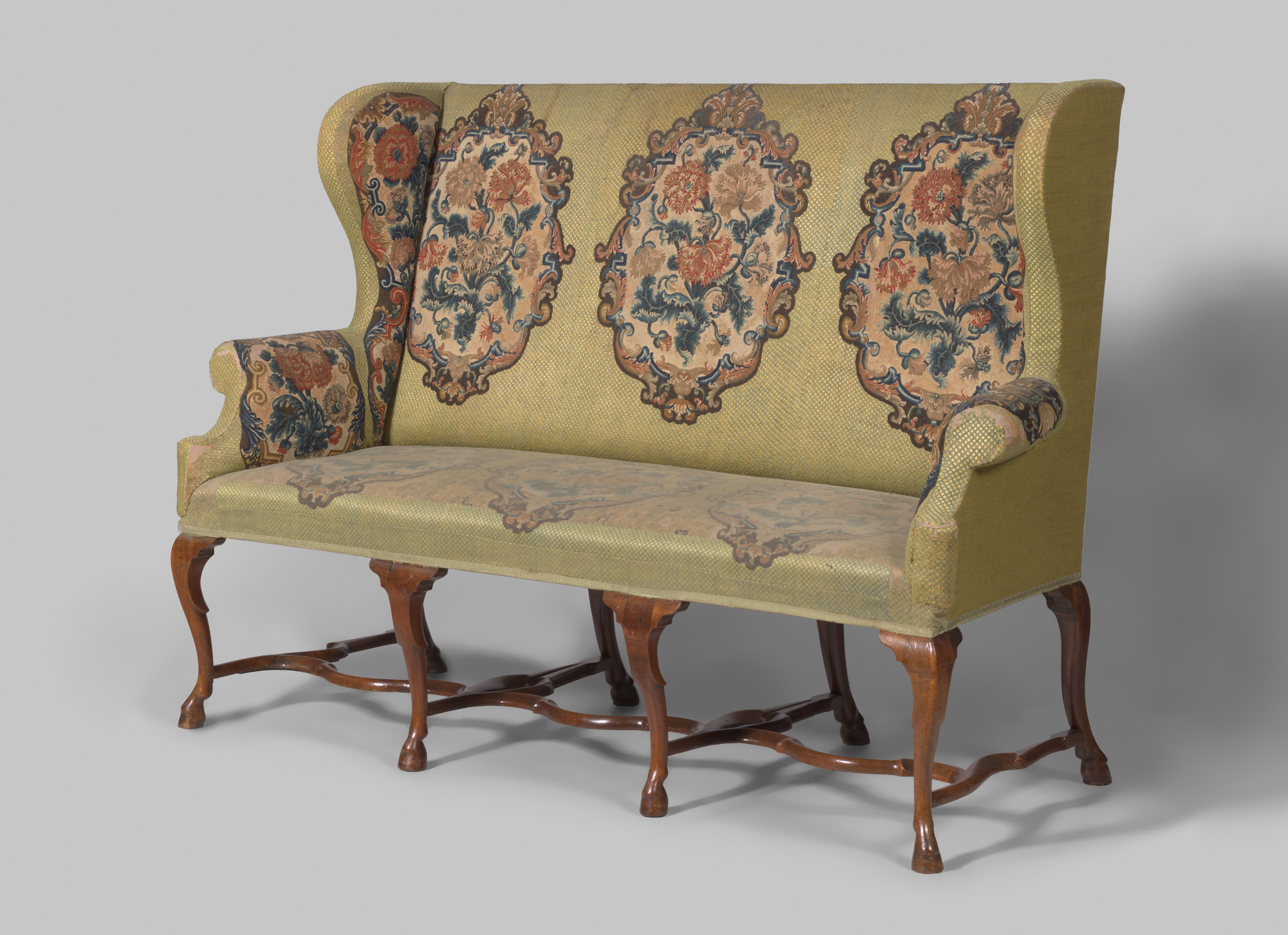
Cabriole legs with hoof feet. Settee, Dutch, circa 1720–50

Cabriole legs with paw feet. Armchair, British, circa 1730

The exaggerated knees and flat feet parody the elegance of the cabriole legs on chests from urban Massachusetts. High chest of drawers, American, 1730–40

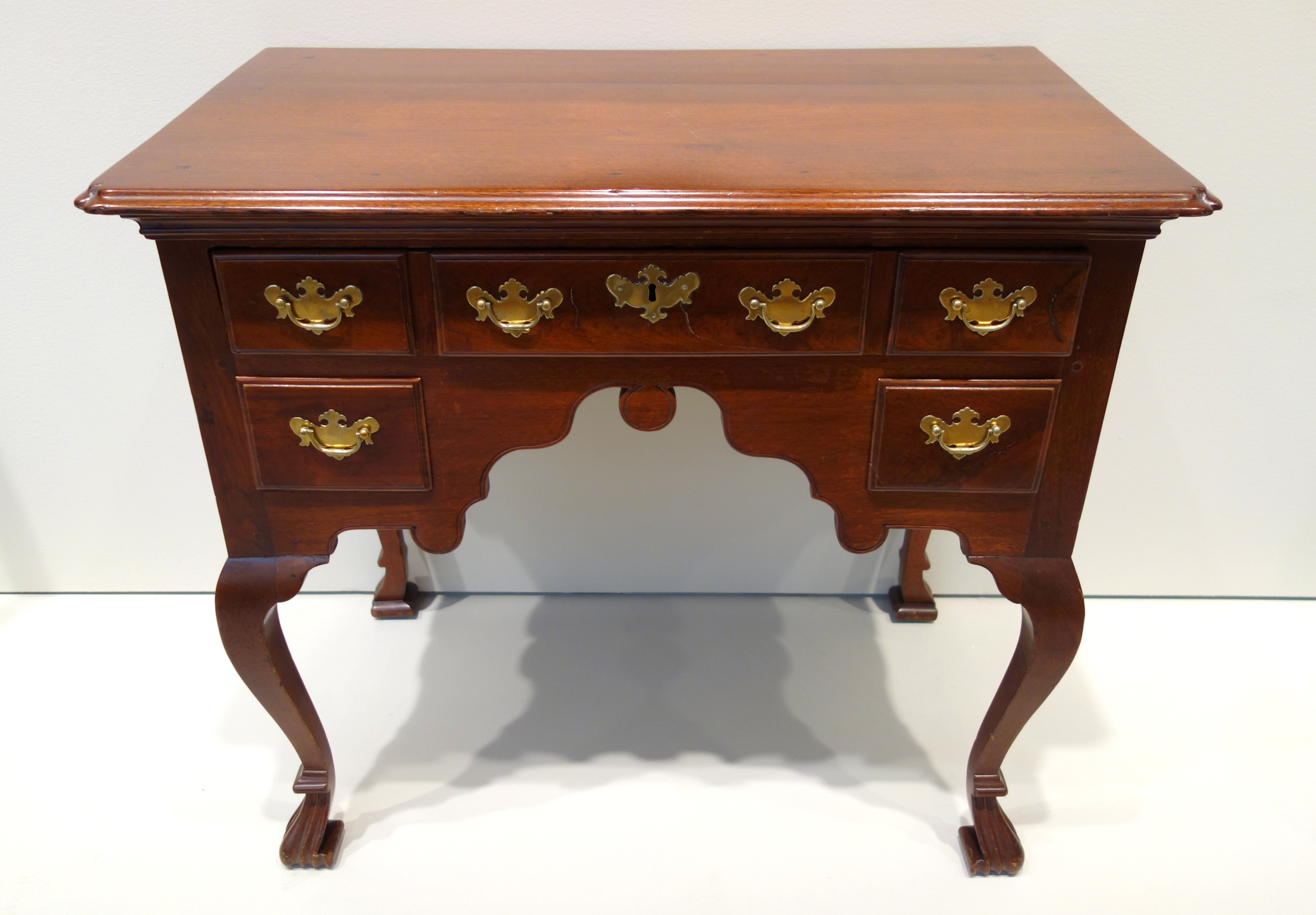
Cabriole legs with Spanish feet. Dressing Table, American, 1730–45

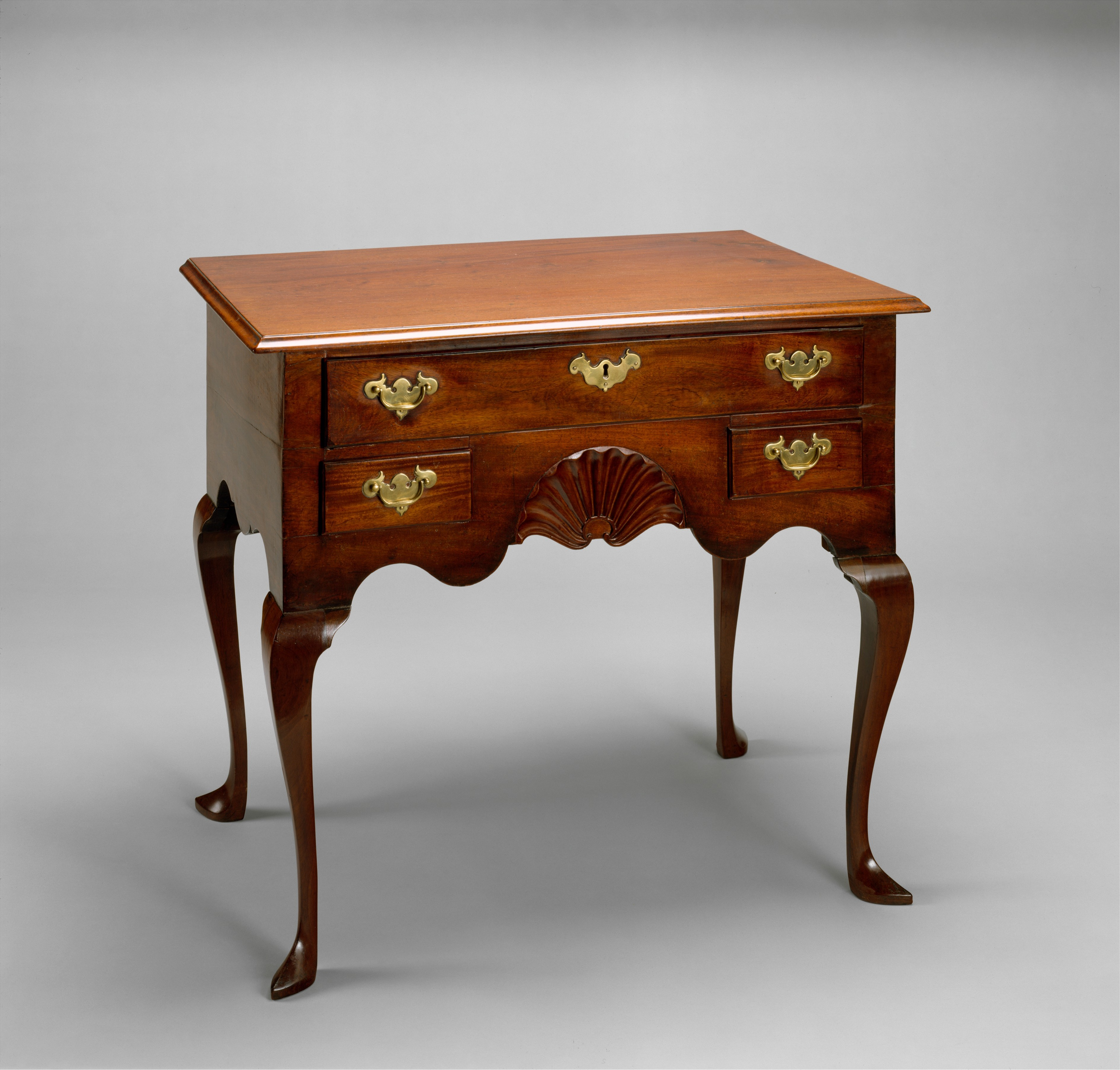
Cabriole legs with slipper feet. Dressing Table, American, 1740–50

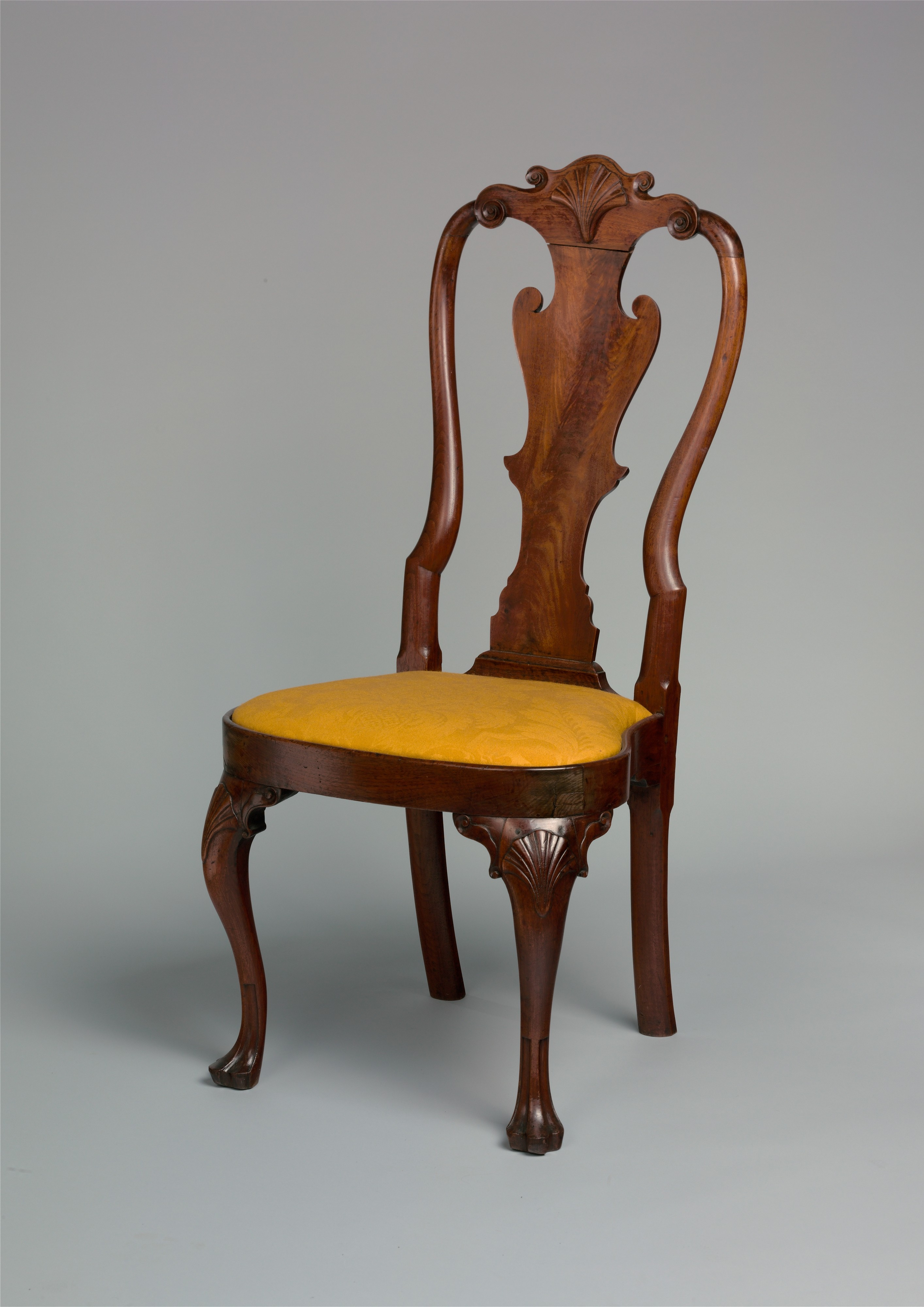
Cabriole legs with trifid feet. Side Chair, American, 1740–60

Cabriole legs with dolphin feet. Armchair, British, circa 1755

Cabriole legs with scroll feet. Armchair, British, circa 1755–60

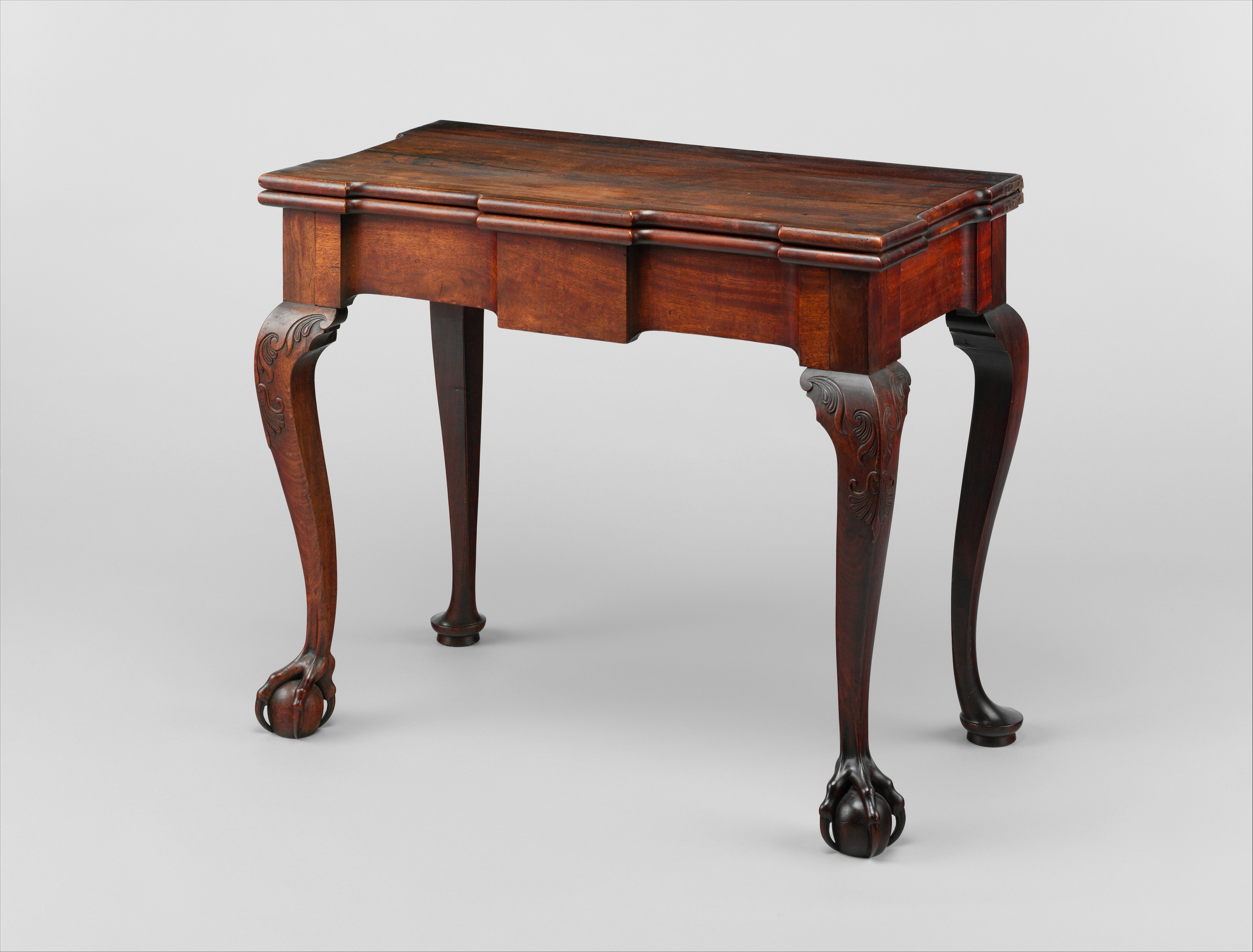
Cabriole legs with claw-and-ball feet in front and pad feet in back. Card Table, American, 1760–85

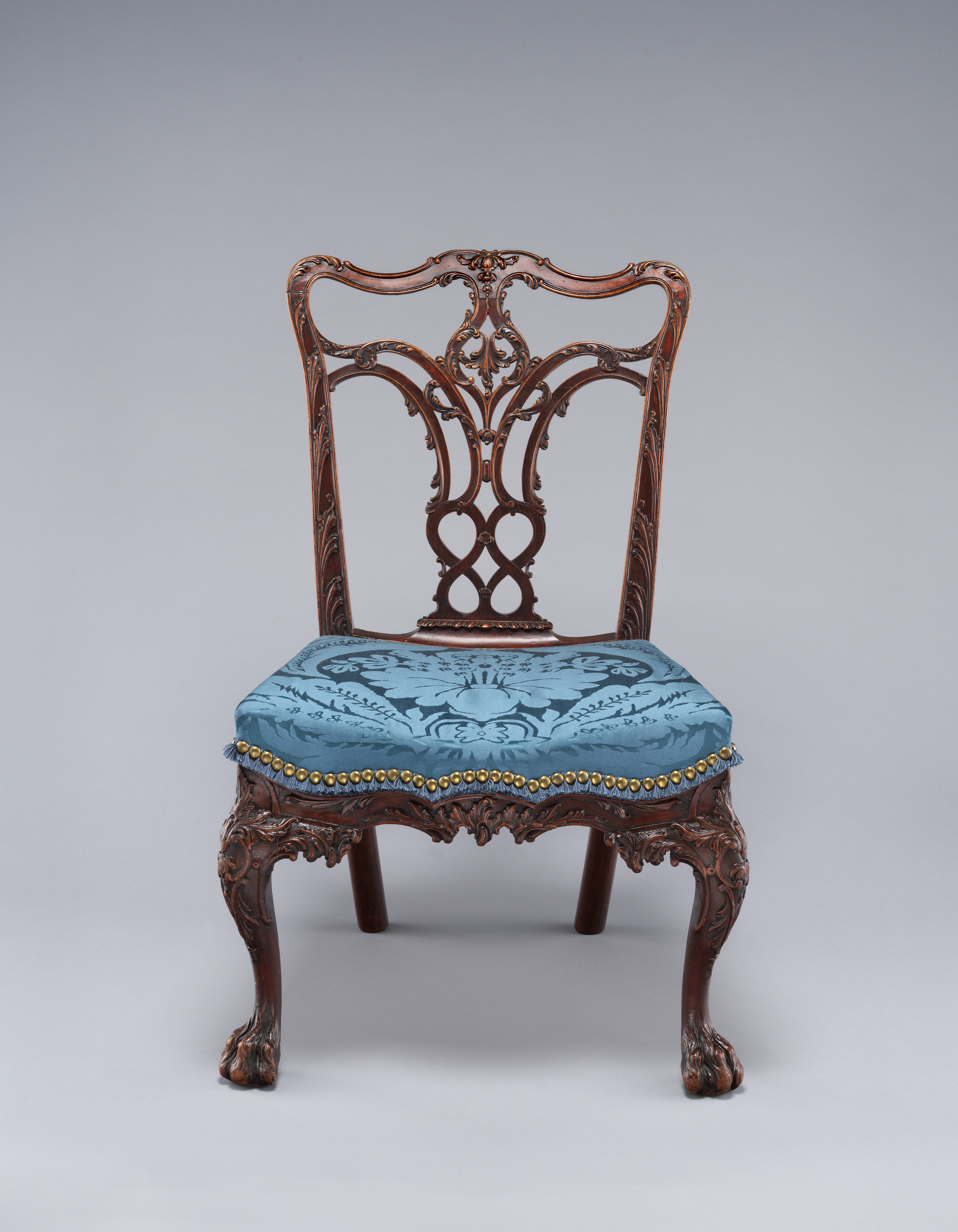
Cabriole legs with hairy paw feet. Side Chair, American, circa 1769

== See also ==
- Foot (furniture)
- Highboy
- Nursing chair
- Ormolu
