= Spindle (furniture) =

Cylindrically symmetrical element in furniture

A spindle, in furniture, is a cylindrically symmetric shaft, usually made of wood. A spindle is usually made of a single piece of wood and typically has decoration (also axially symmetric) fashioned by hand or with a lathe. The spindle was common at least as early as the 17th century in Western Europe as an element of chair and table legs, stretchers, candlesticks, balusters, and other pieces of cabinetry. By definition, the axis of a spindle is straight; hence, for example, a spindle-legged chair is a straight-legged design, even though cylindrical symmetry allows decoration of elaborate notches or bulbs, so long as the cylindrical symmetry is preserved.

The spindle leg design is characteristic of many Victorian and earlier nursing chairs, exposed wood armchairs and a variety of cabinets and tables. In French furniture, the spindle leg may be found on fauteuils, chairs, a variety of tables and other pieces.

== See also ==
- Gateleg table
- Windsor chair
