= Foot (furniture) =

Furniture component

A foot is a small part at the bottom of a piece of furniture. When placed on the floor, the feet support the weight of the furniture. Feet are often attached to legs, which connect to the rest of the object. (Compare foot, human leg.)

The types of feet include:

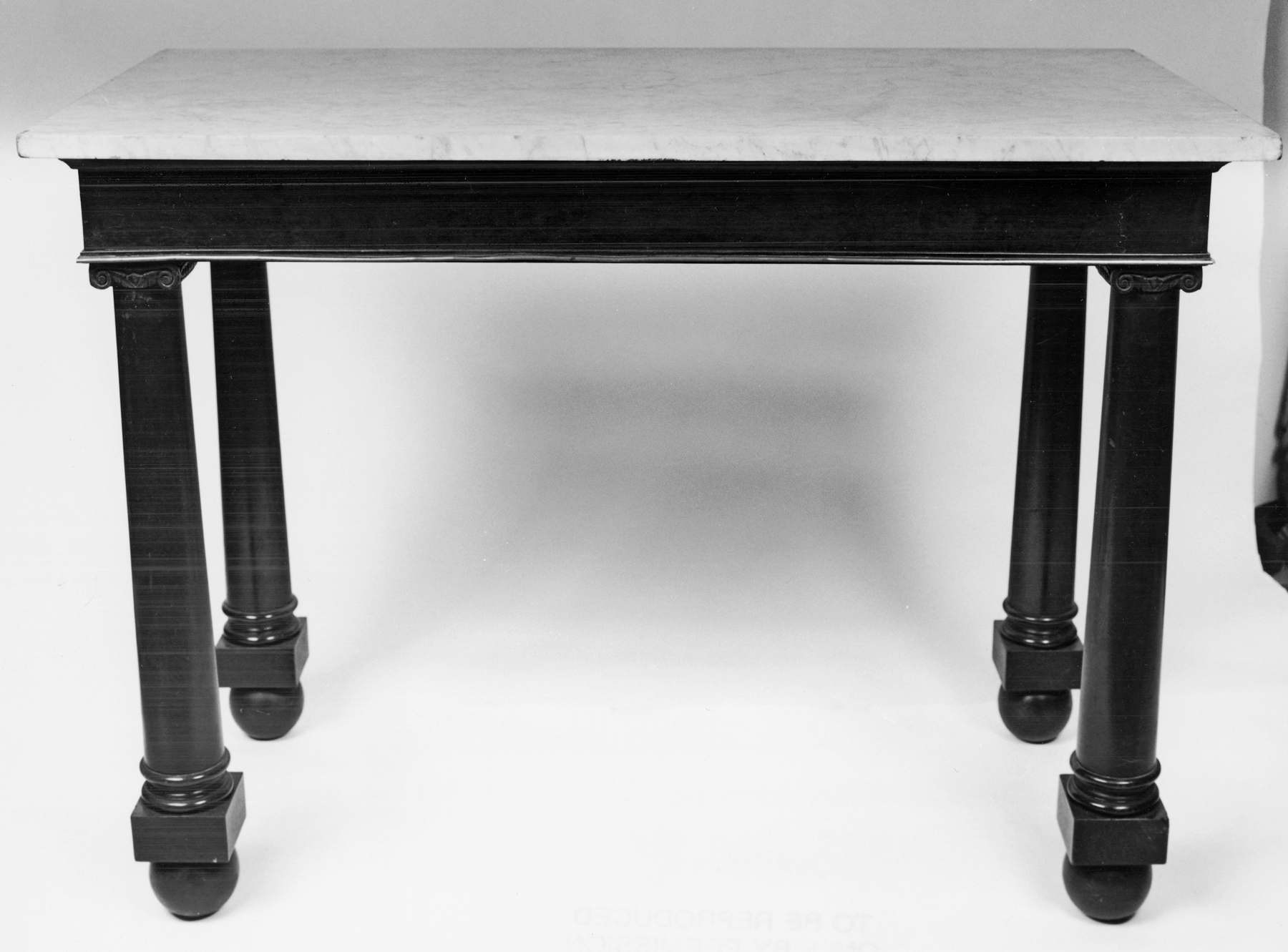
Ball feet

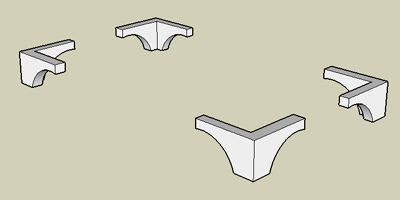
Bracket foot base

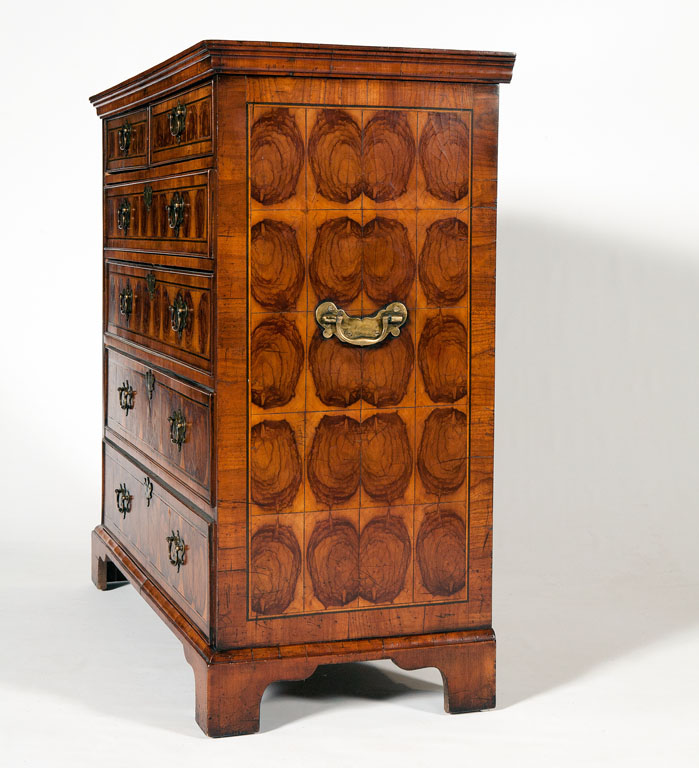
19th century bracket feet

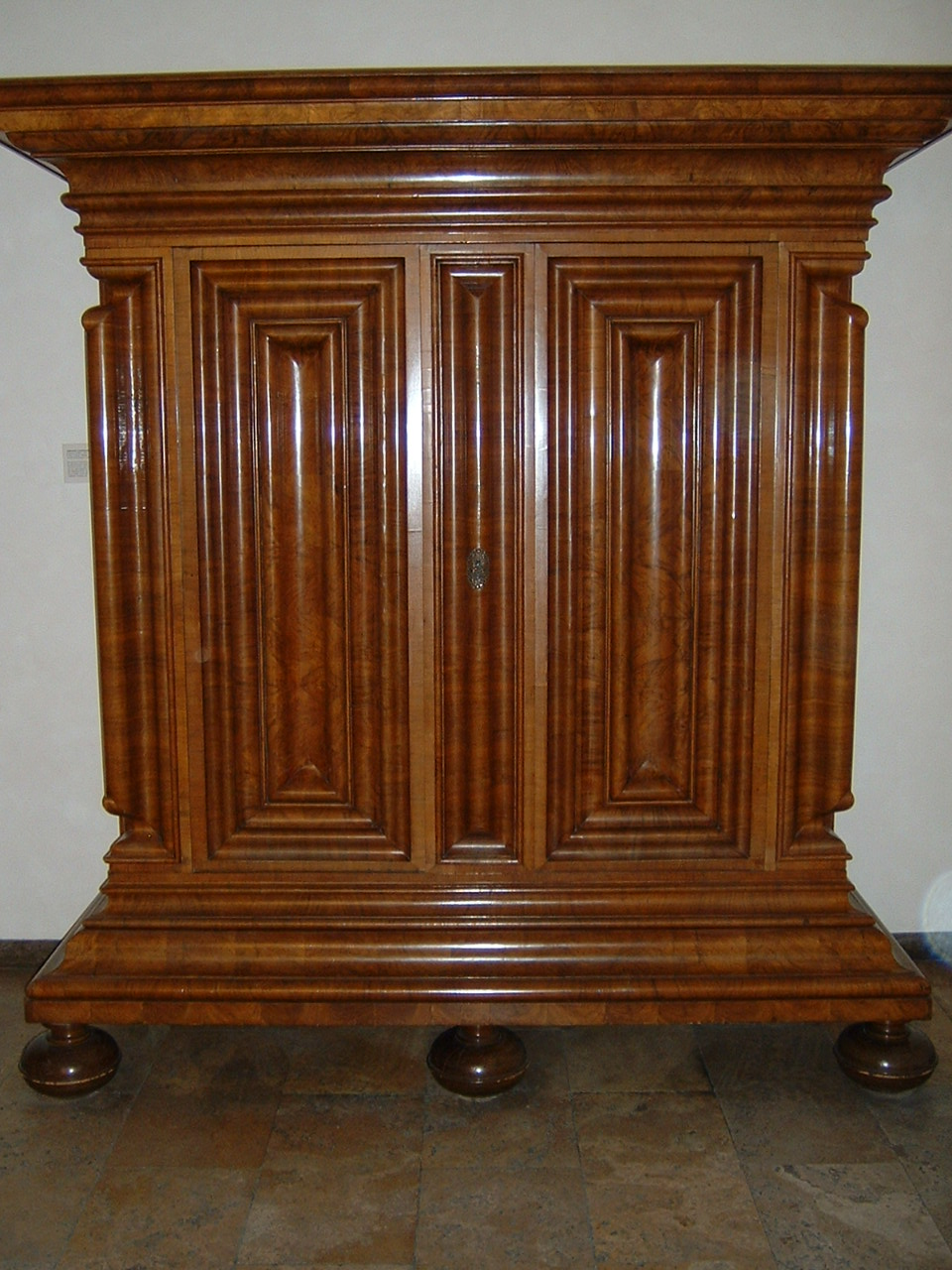
Bun feet

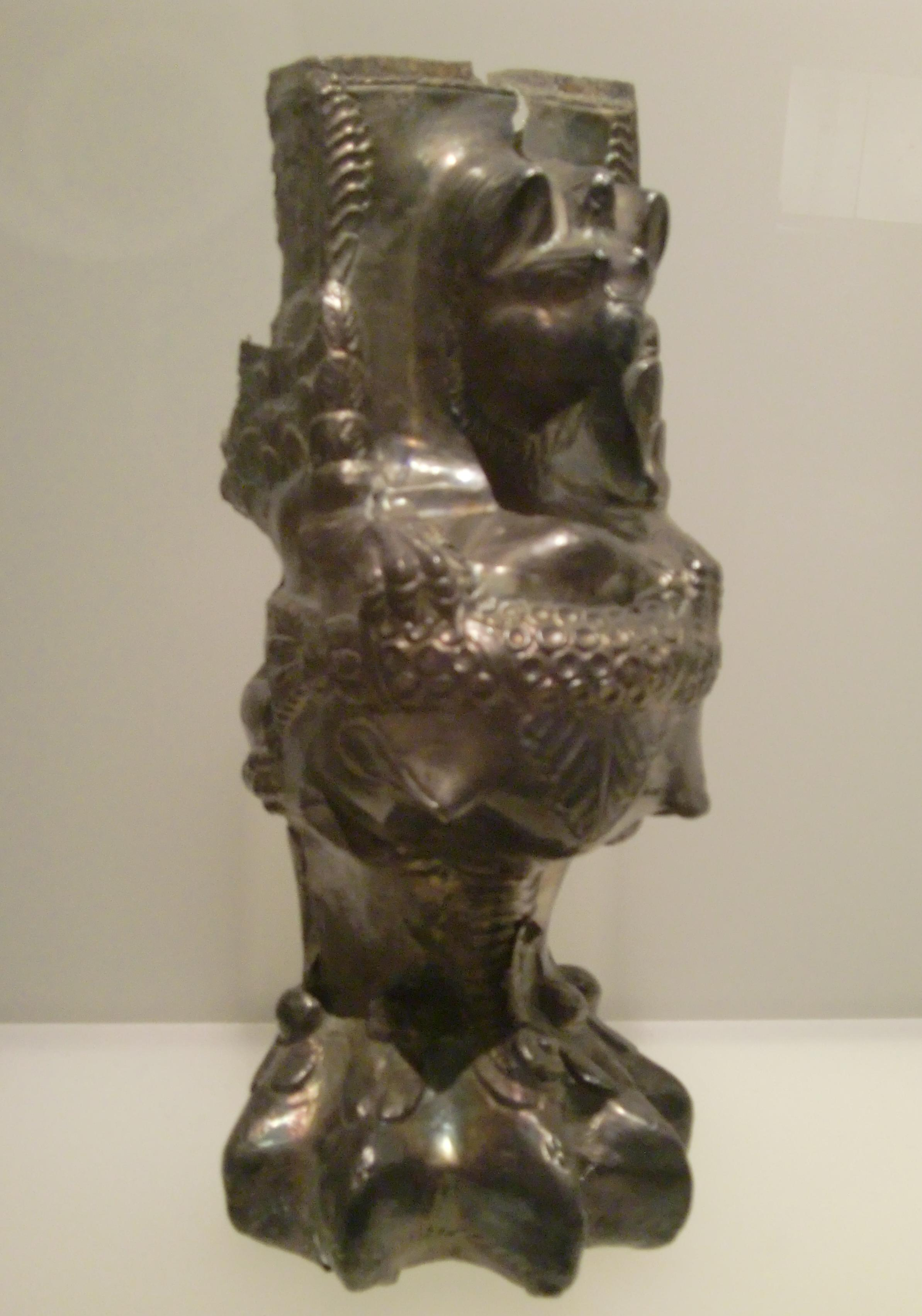
Claw foot

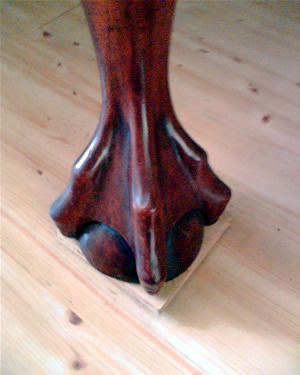
Claw-and-ball foot

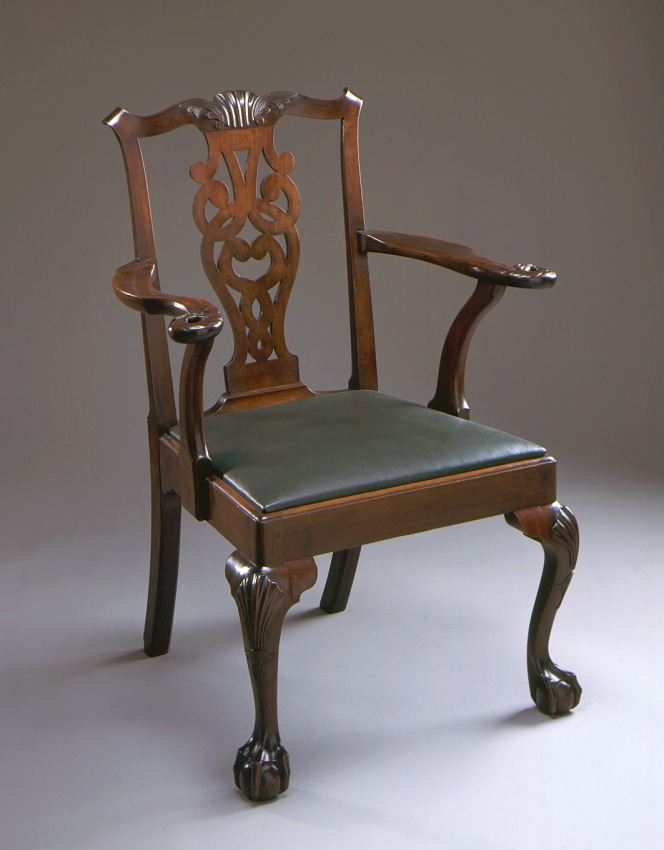
Claw and ball feet

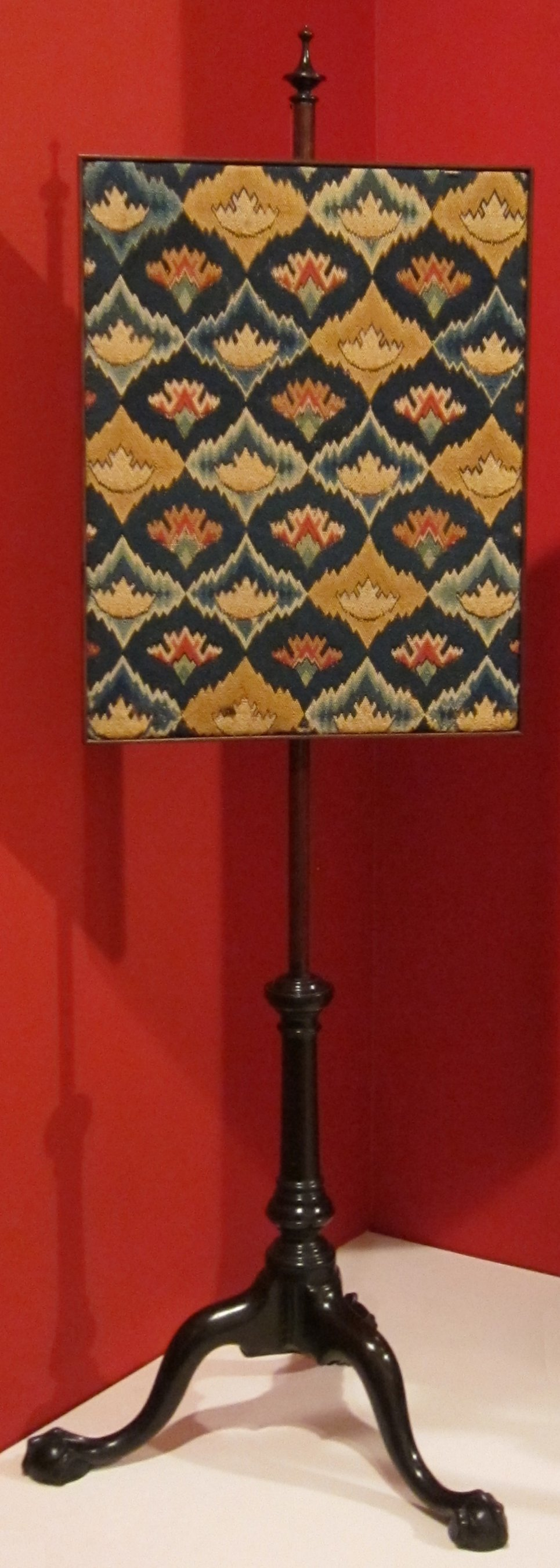
Cabriole legs with claw-and-ball feet

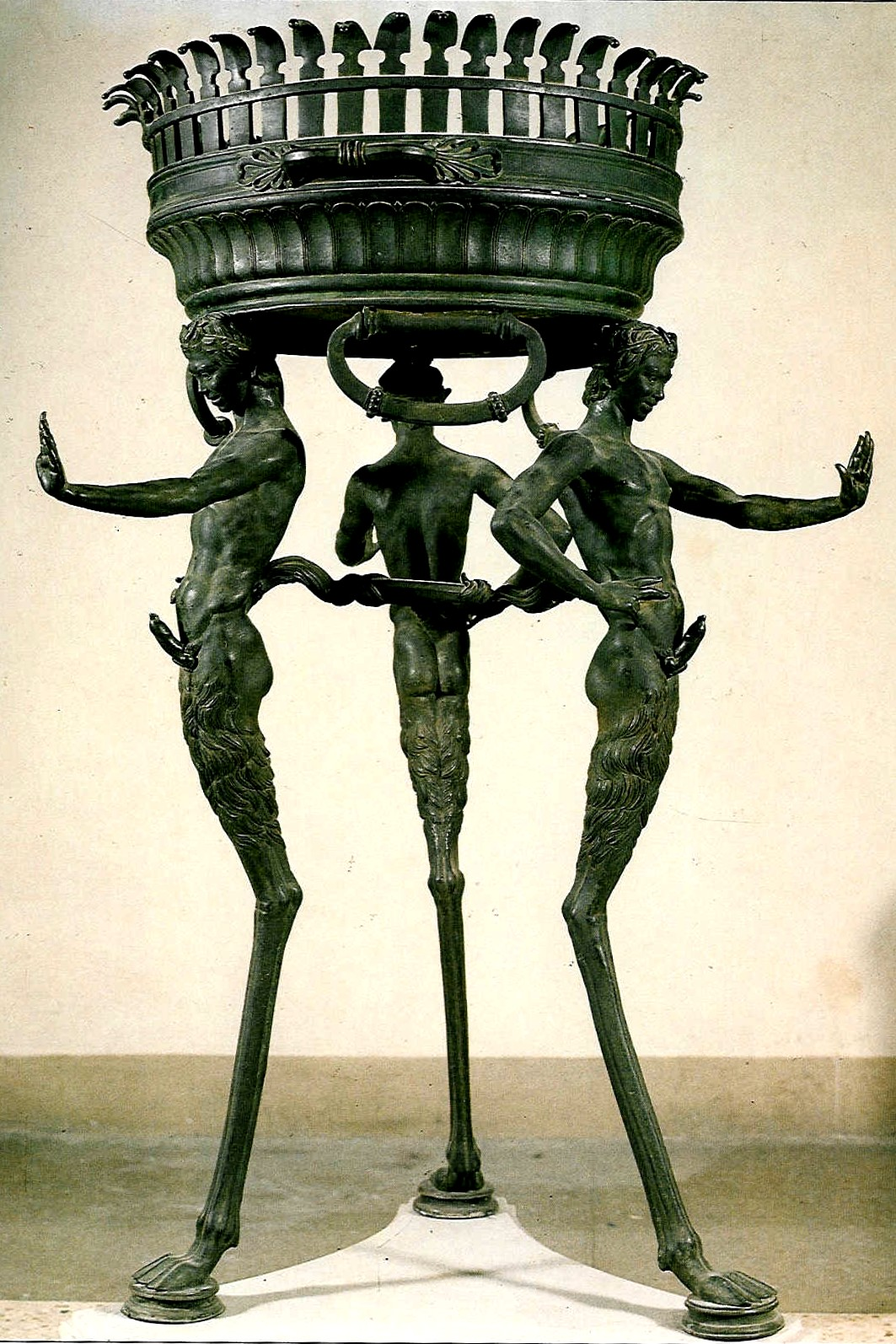
Cloven feet

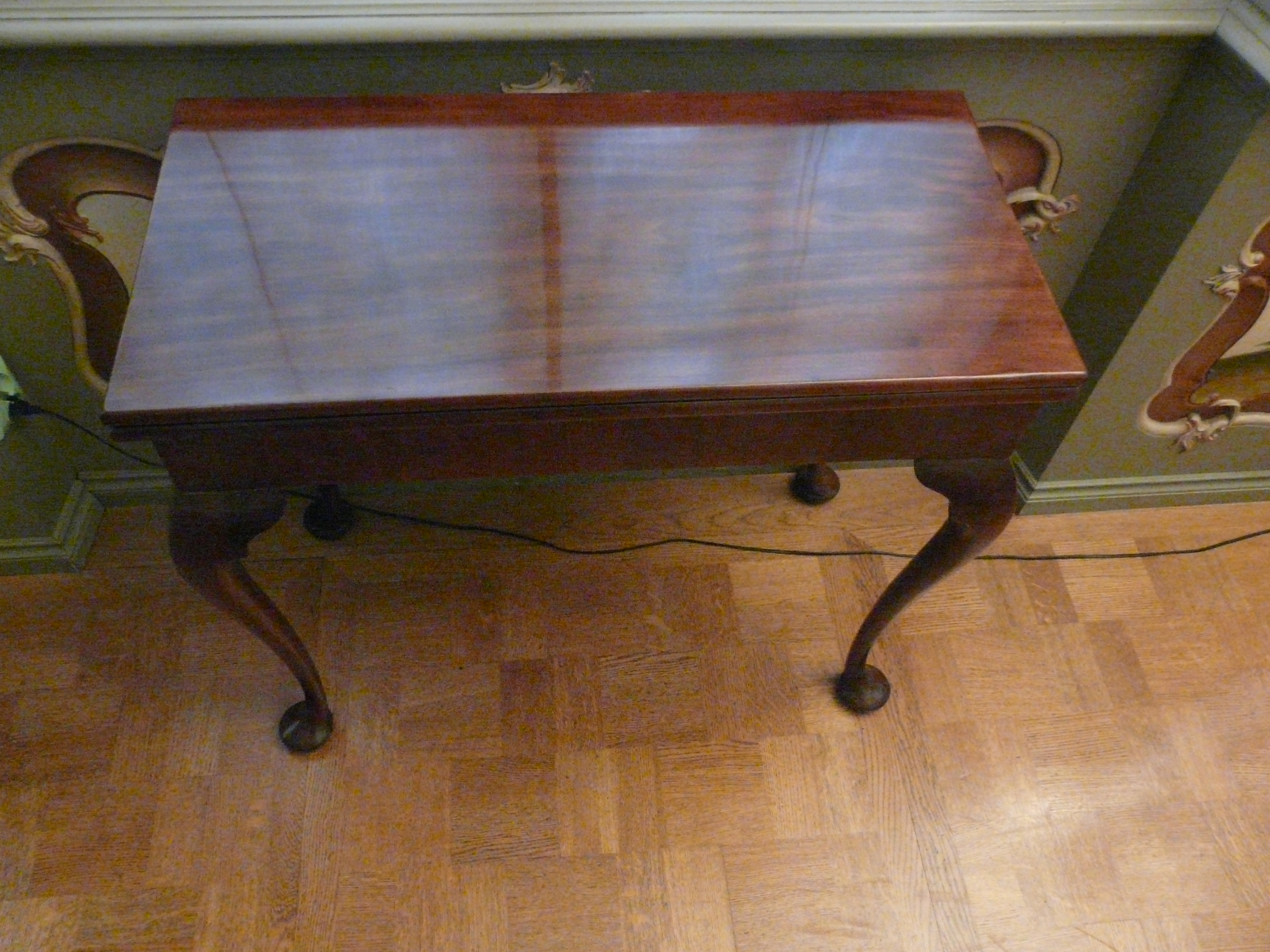
Club feet, also known as duck, Dutch, or pad feet

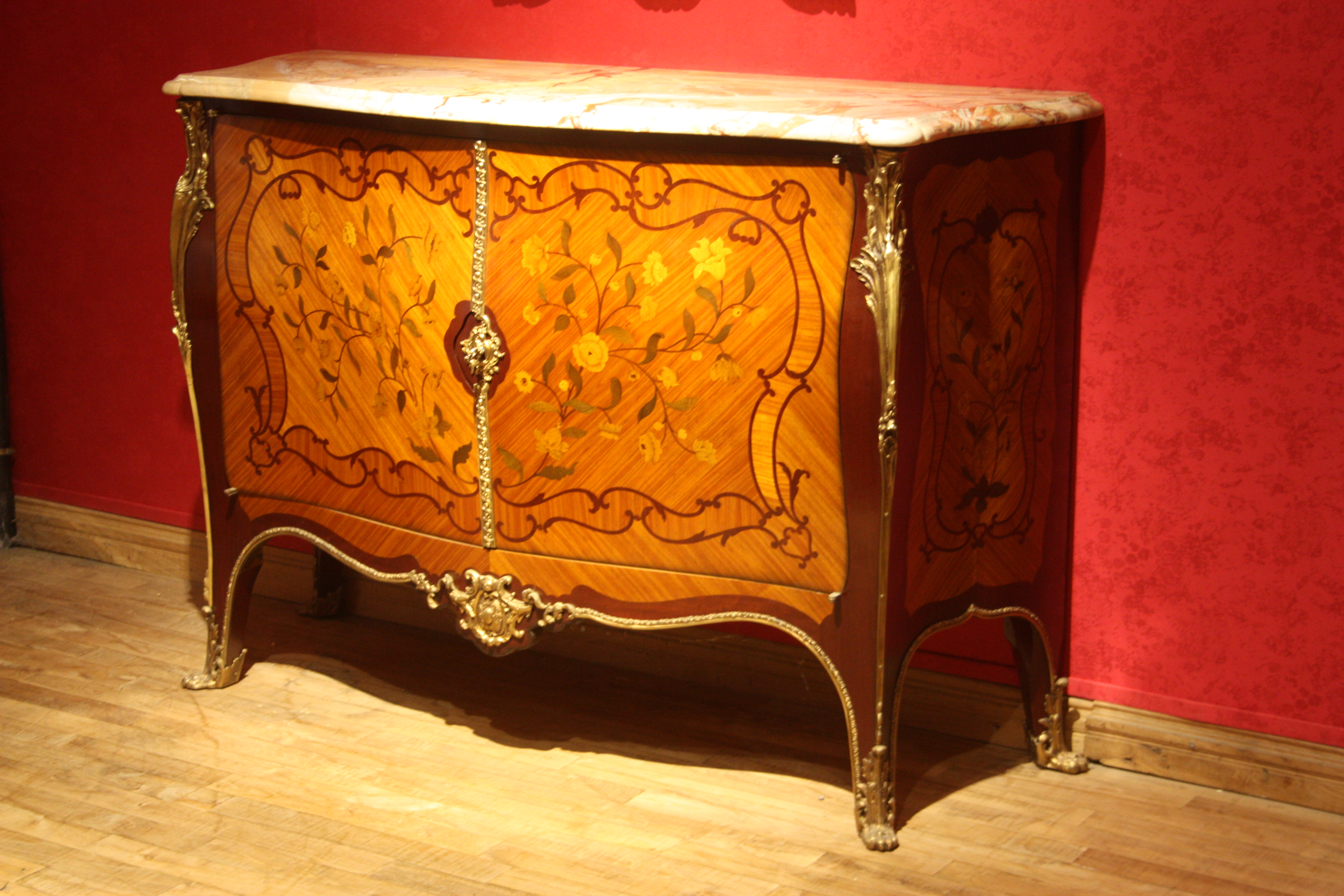
French feet

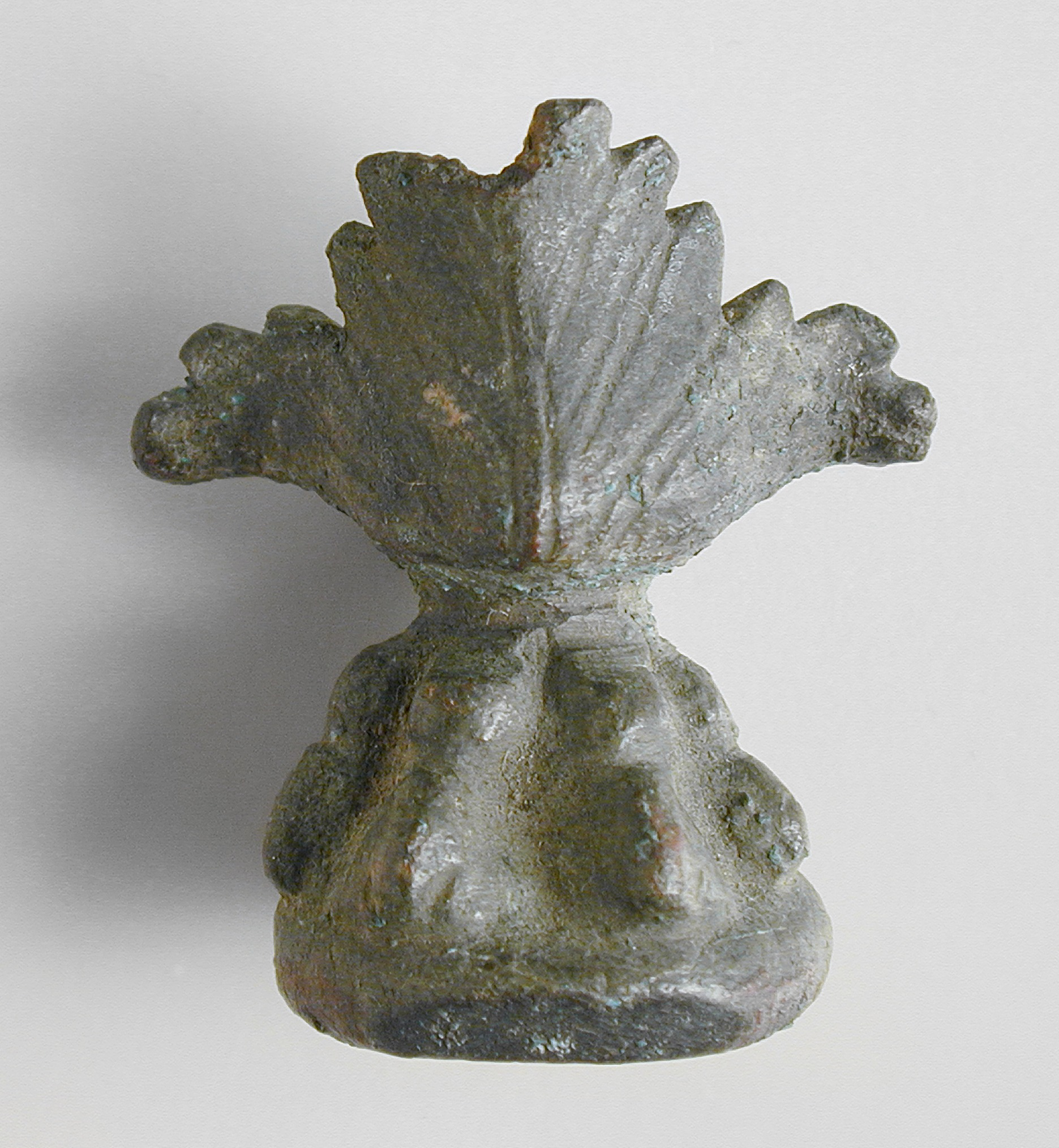
Lion's paw foot (compare Lion's paw scallop) and acanthus leaf scroll

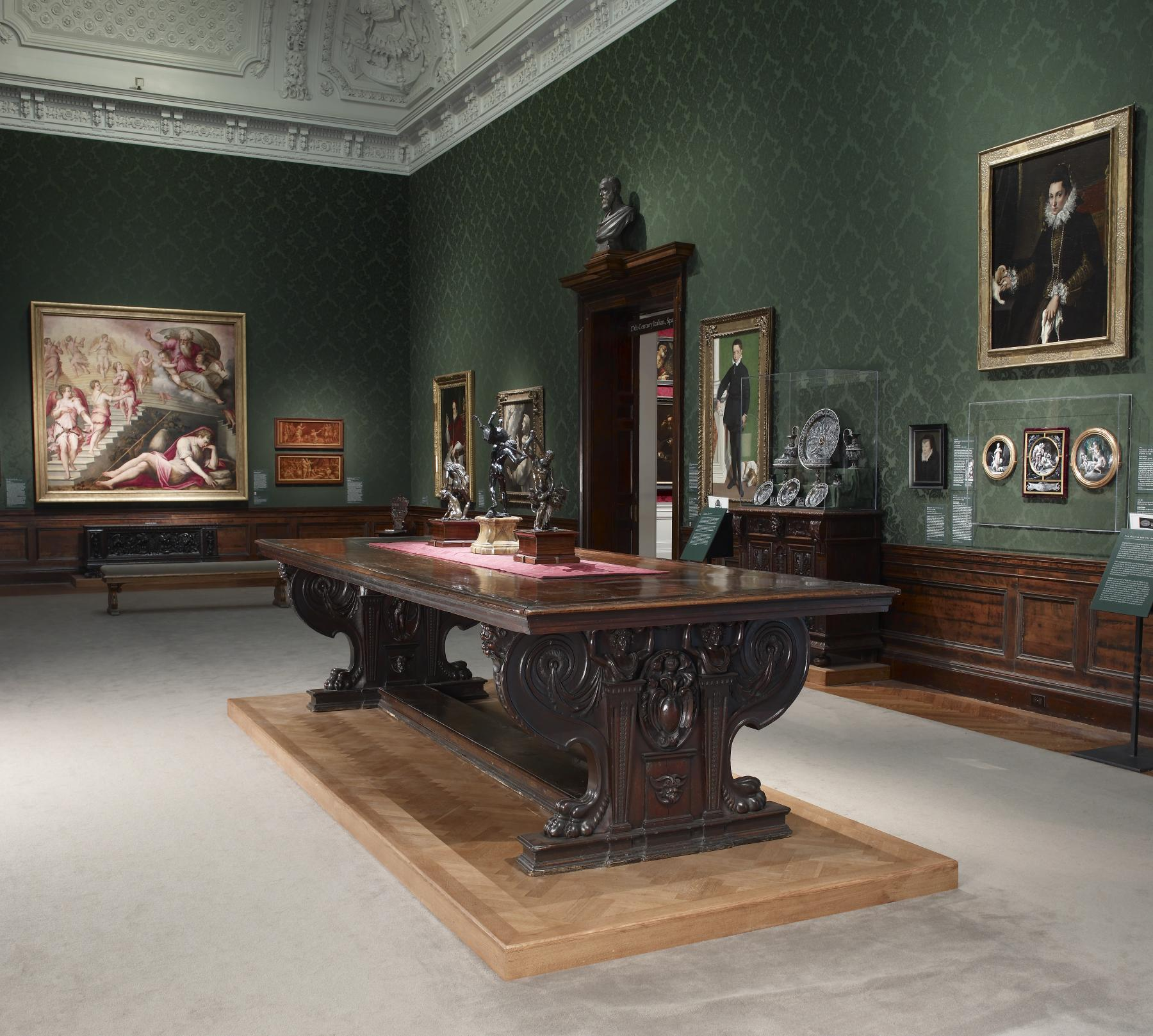
Lion's feet

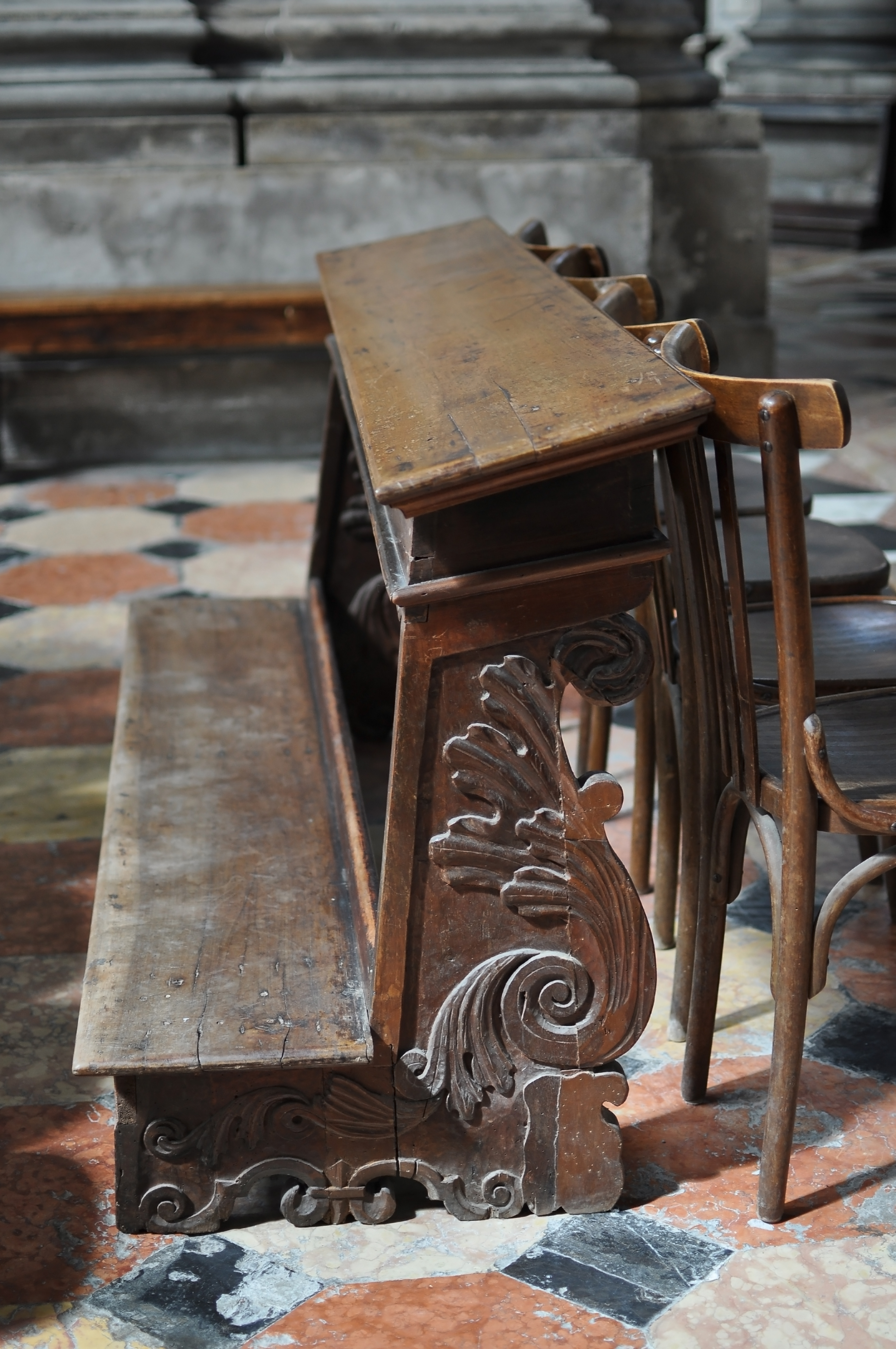
Scrolled foot

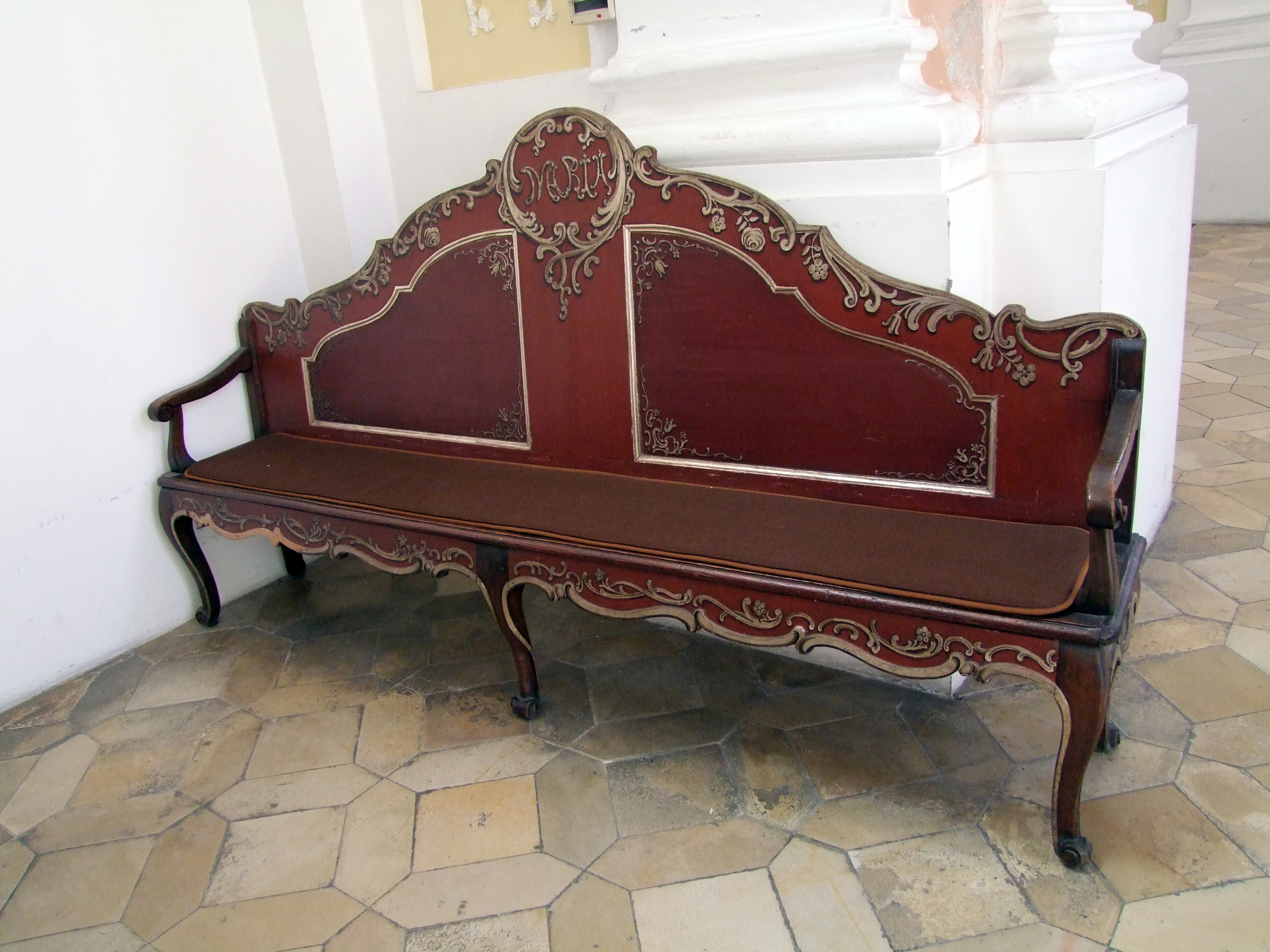
Scrolled feet

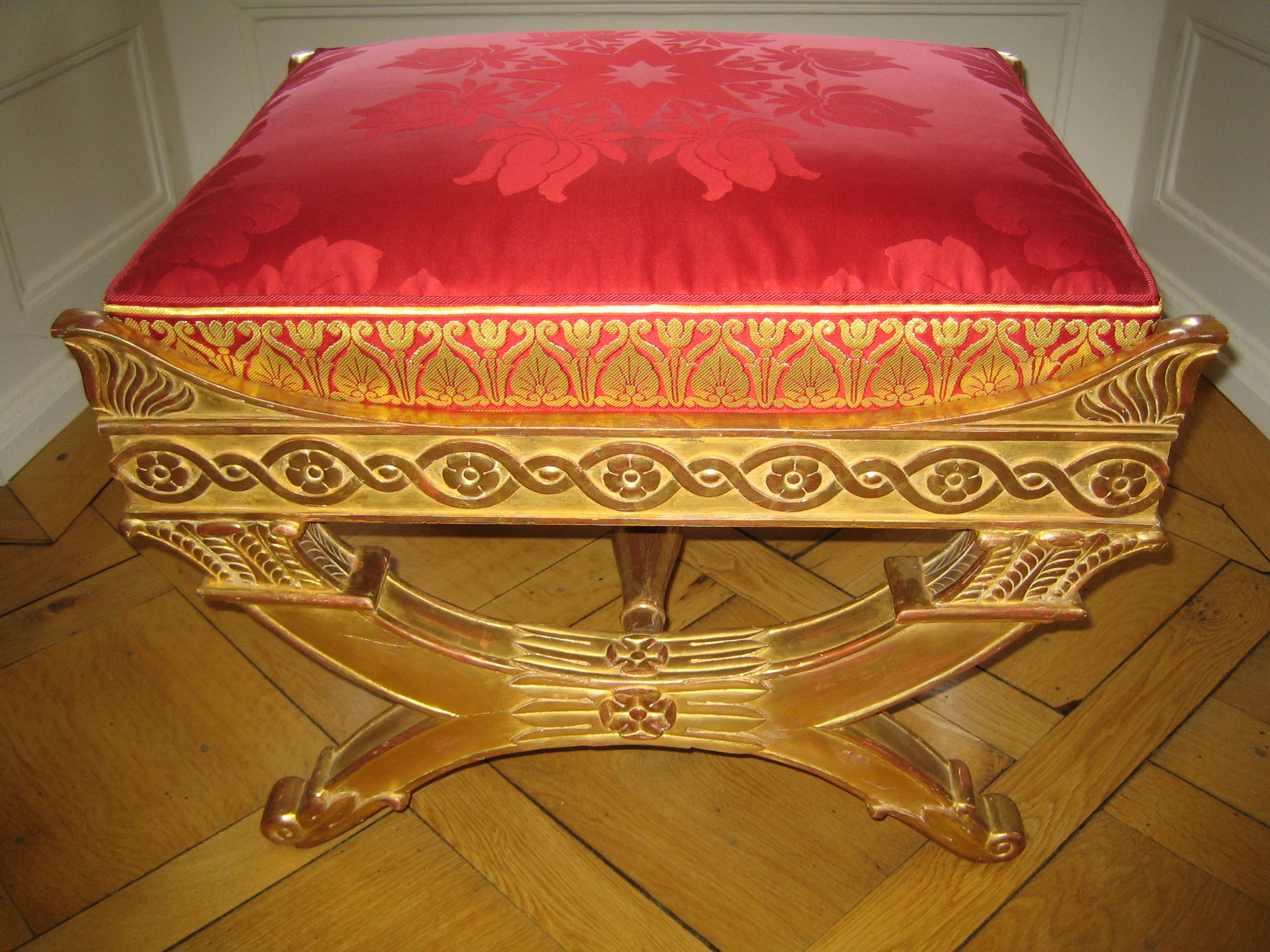
Scrolled feet

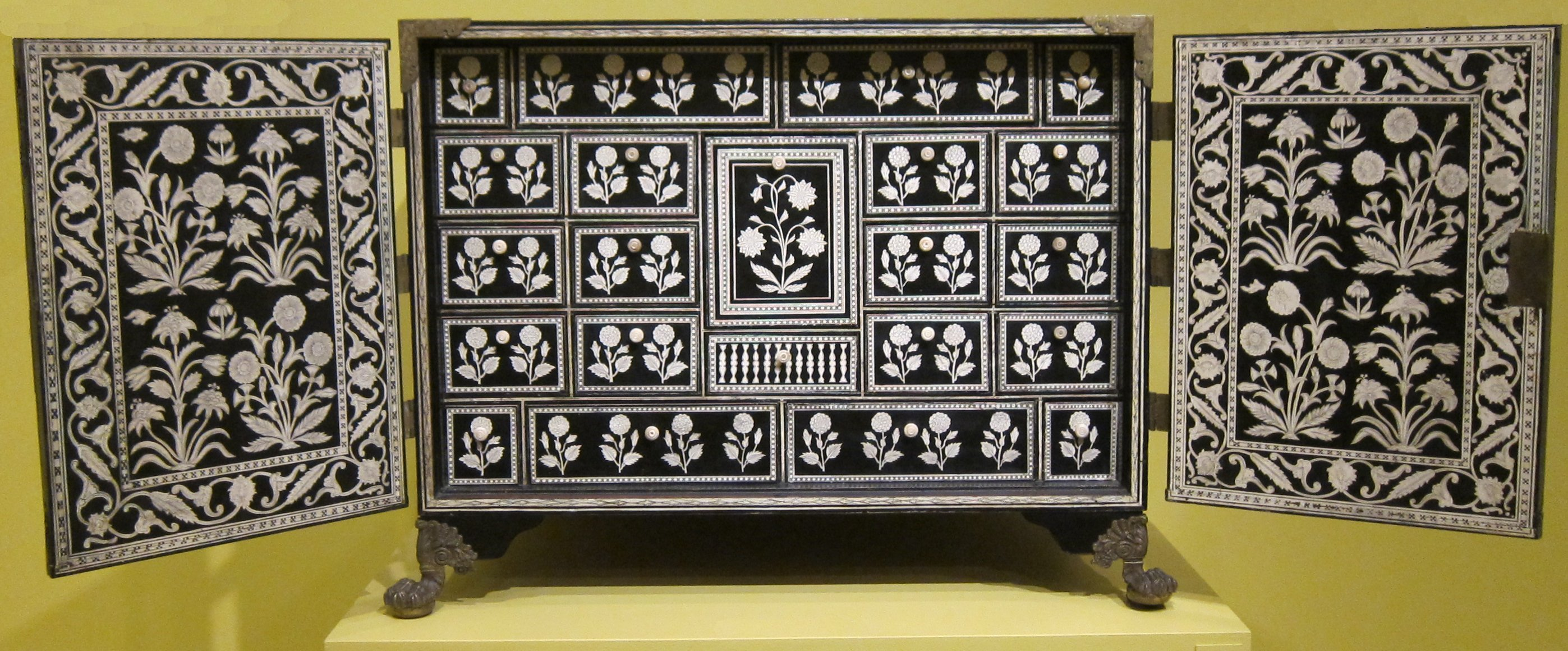
Splayed feet

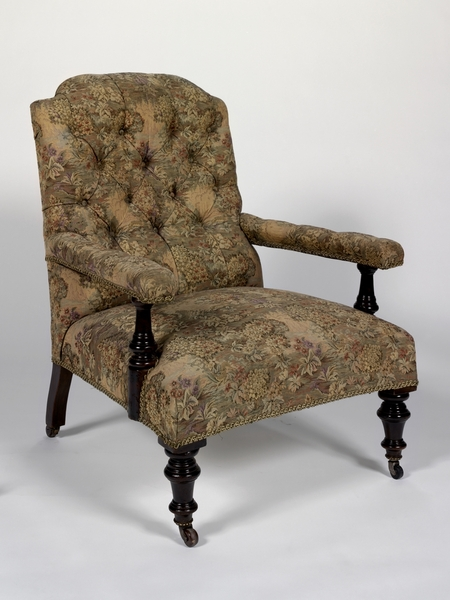
Turned foot

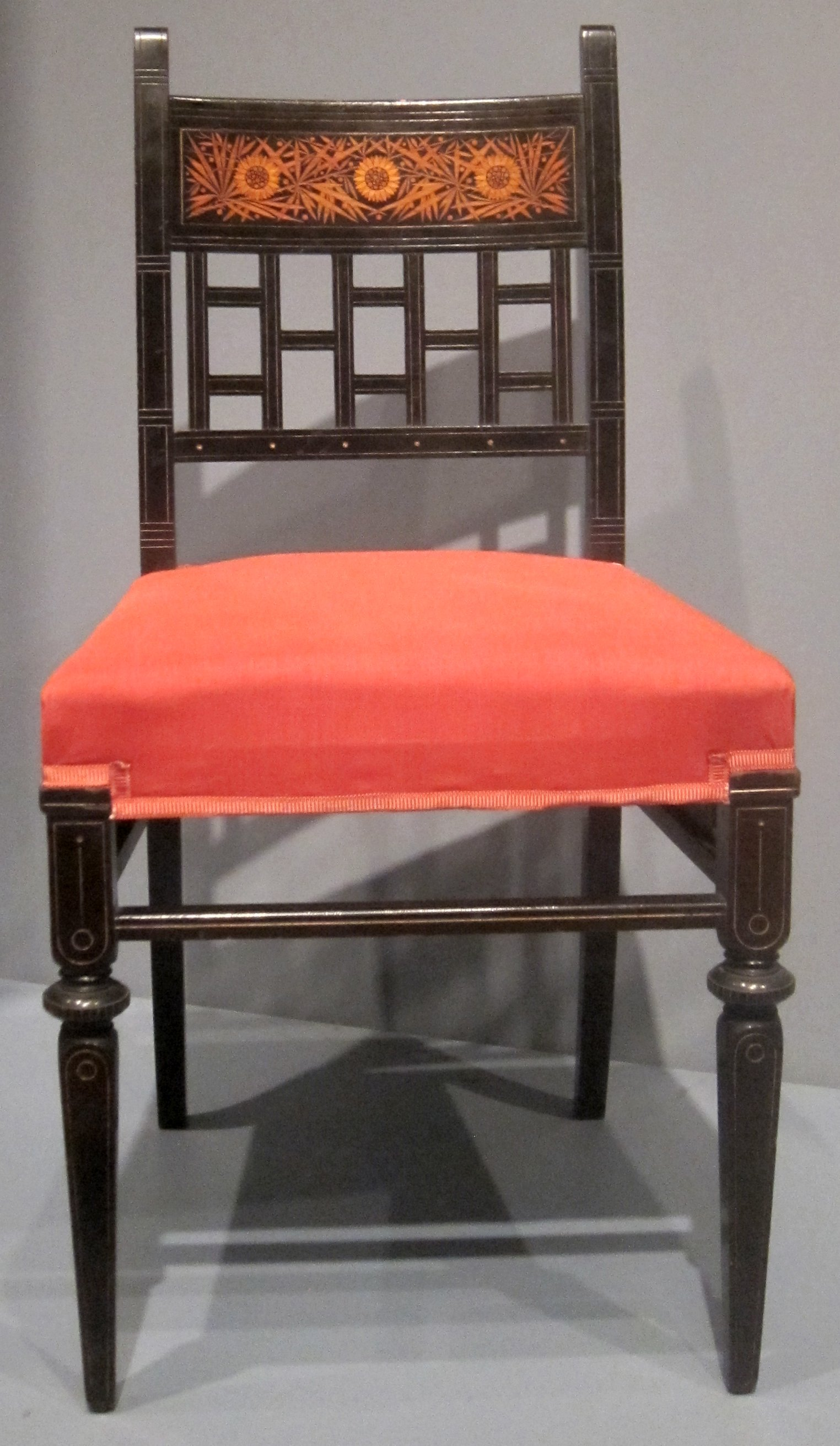
Turned foot

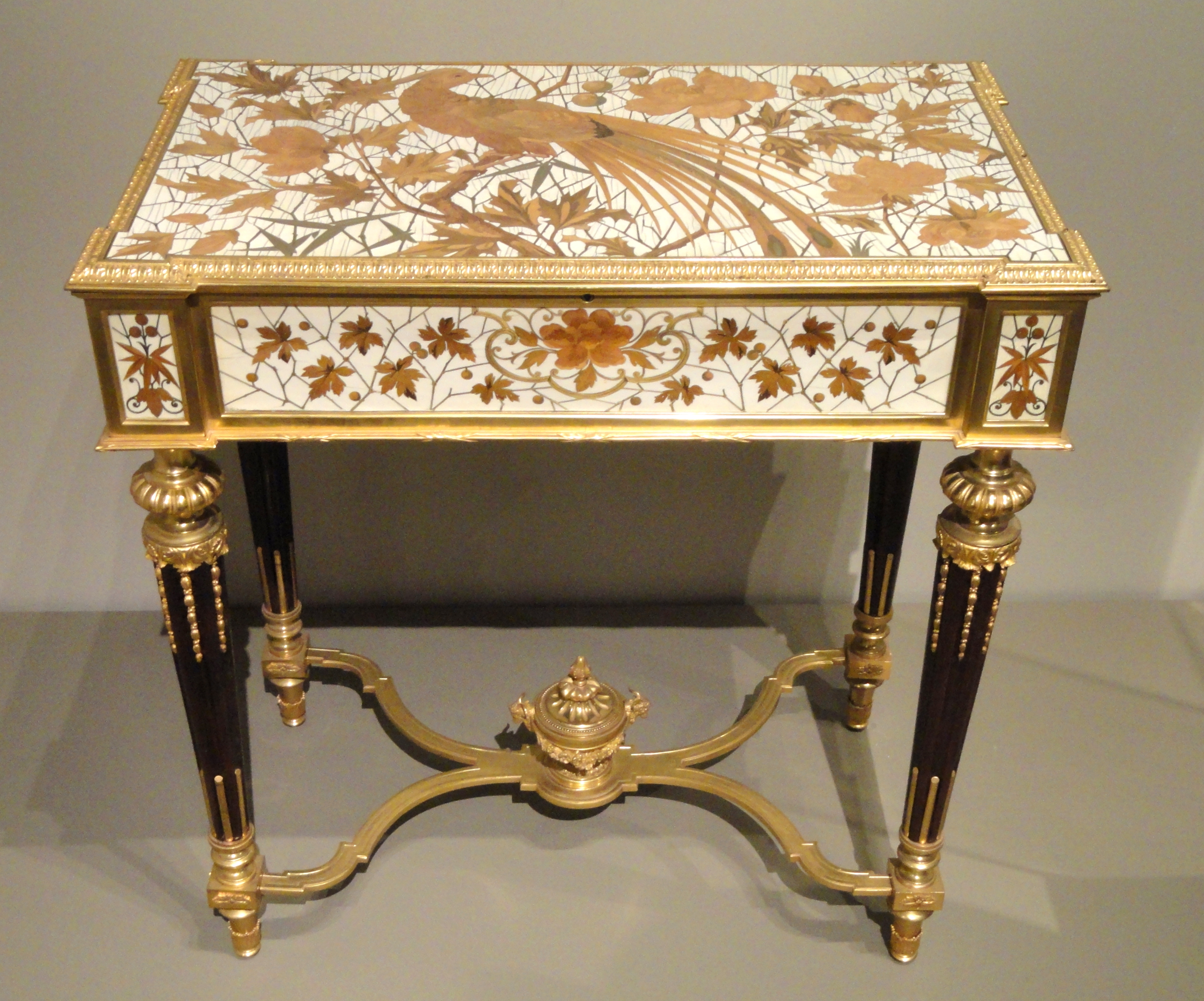
Turned foot
- Hoof foot
- Stump foot

== See also ==
- Paw feet
- Pedestal chair
- Table (furniture) § Pedestal tables
