= Women in the workforce =

All women who perform some kind of job

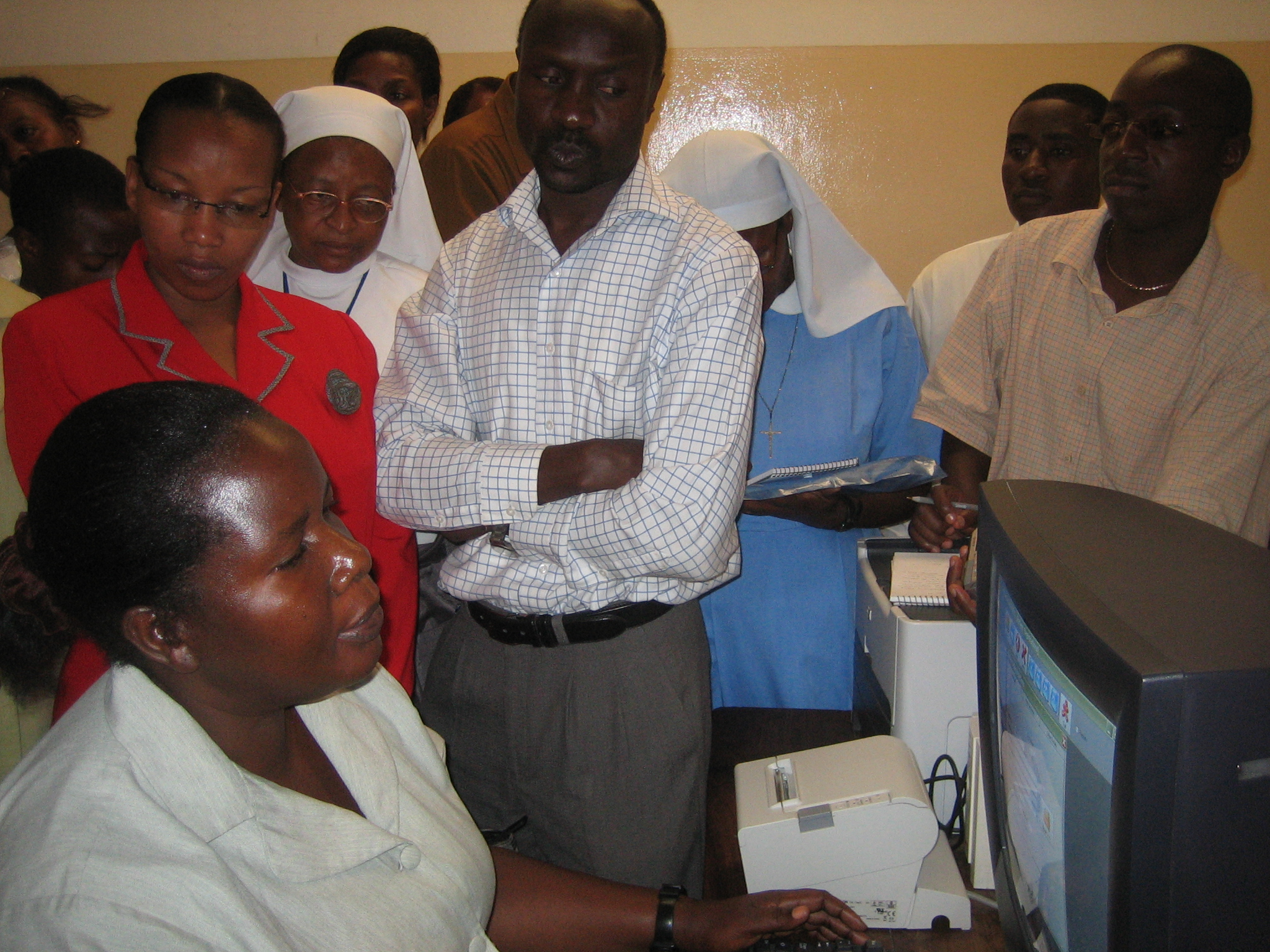
A woman employee demonstrates a hospital information management system in Tanzania

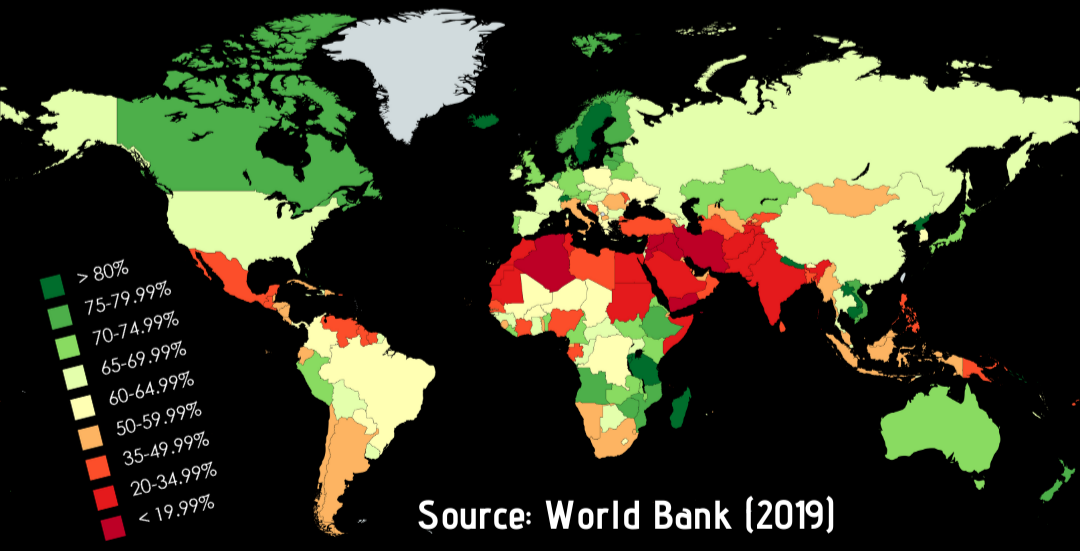
Female labor force participation rate, ages 15-64 (World Bank/ILO, 2019)

Proportion of women in senior and middle management positions (2017)

Since the Industrial Revolution, participation of women in the workforce outside the home has increased in industrialized nations, with particularly large growth seen in the 20th century. Largely seen as a boon for industrial society, women in the workforce contribute to a higher national economic output as measure in GDP as well as decreasing labor costs by increasing the labor supply in a society.

Women's lack of access to higher education had effectively excluded them from the practice of well-paid and high status occupations. Entry of women into the higher professions, like law and medicine, was delayed in most countries due to women being denied entry to universities and qualification for degrees. For example, Cambridge University only fully validated degrees for women late in 1947, and even then only after much opposition and acrimonious debate. Women were largely limited to low-paid and poor status occupations for most of the 19th and 20th centuries, or earned less pay than men for doing the same work. However, through the 20th century, the labor market shifted. Office work that does not require heavy labor expanded and women increasingly acquired the higher education that led to better-compensated, longer-term careers rather than lower-skilled, shorter-term jobs. Mothers are less likely to be employed unlike men and women without children.

The increasing rates of women contributing in the work force has led to a more equal disbursement of hours worked across the regions of the world. However, in western European countries the nature of women's employment participation remains markedly different from that of men.

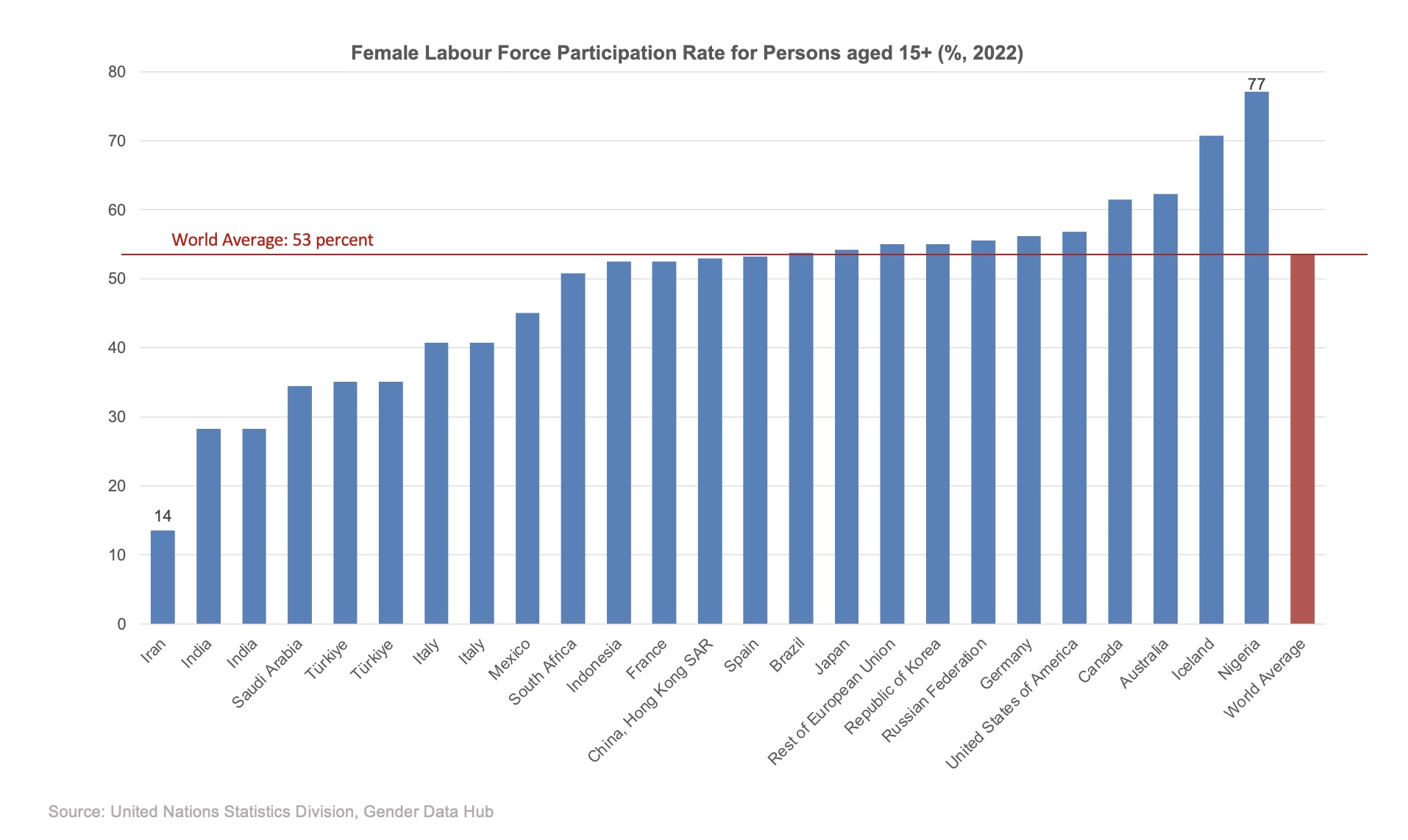
Female Labor Force Participation for persons aged 15+ (percent, 2022) in select countries

According to the United Nations data, the female labor force participation rate for persons aged 15 and older was 53 percent in 2022. The highest was in the Oceania region (excluding Tuvalu) at approximately 65 percent, while the lowest was in Central and Southern Asia at 40 percent. Among individual countries, Iran had the lowest rate at 14 percent, whereas Nigeria had the highest at 77 percent—an increase of nearly 20 percentage points since 2019 (see the graphical representation: "Female Labor Force Participation for persons aged 15+ in select countries").

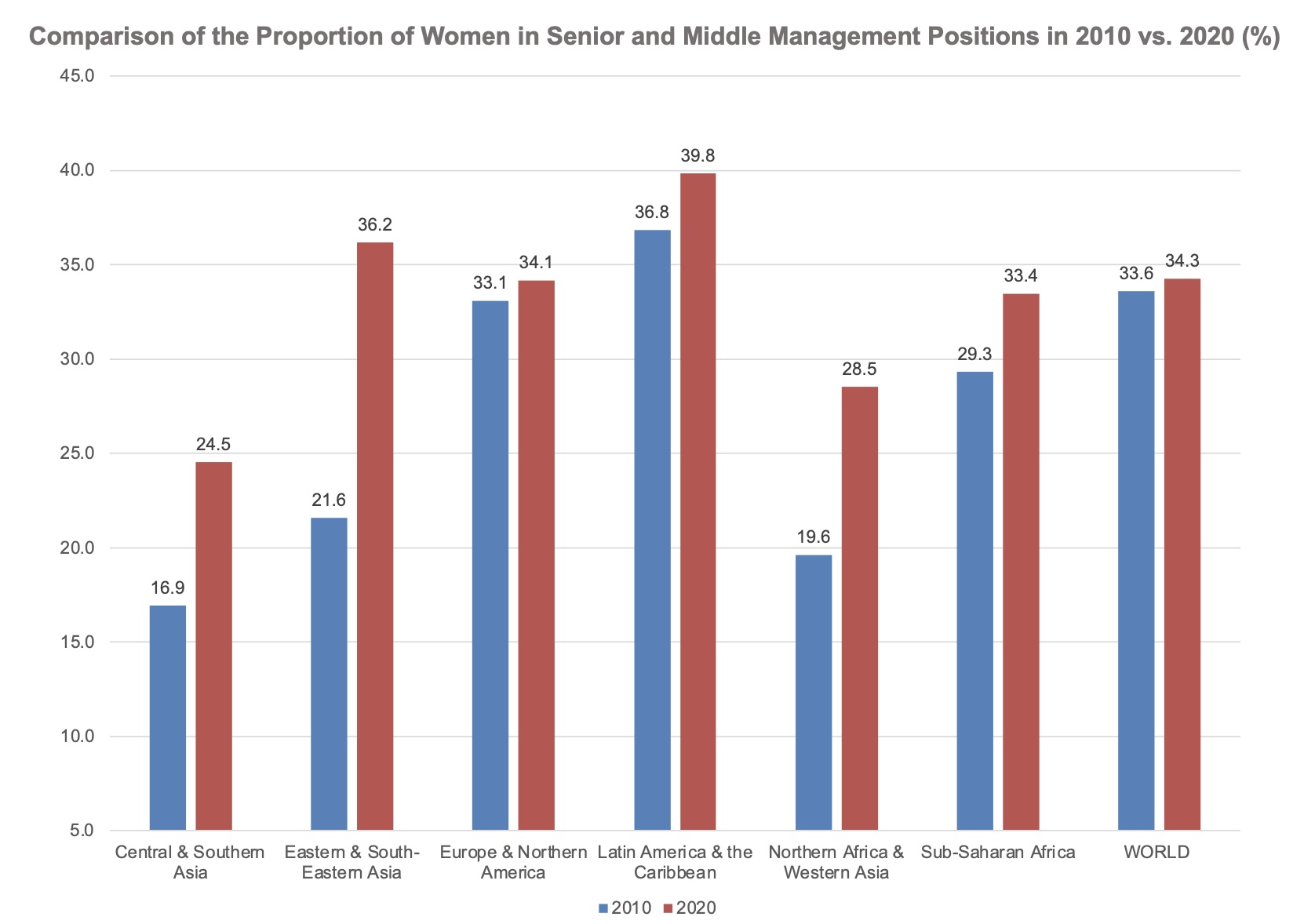
Comparison of the Proportion of Women in Senior and Middle Management Positions by Region in 2010 vs. 2020

Worldwide, the proportion of women in senior and middle management positions has minimally increased between 2010 and 2020, staying around 34 percent on average. Developing countries, as well as emerging market economies, experienced a greater increase than developed countries (see the graphical representation: "Comparison of the Proportion of Women in Senior and Middle Management Positions by Region in 2010 vs. 2020").

Increasing women's equality in banking and the workplace might boost the global economy by up to $28 trillion by 2025.

== Areas of study ==
As the Civil War raged in the U.S., Virginia Penny of Louisville, Kentucky, finished her research project and published the ground-breaking 1862 book, How women can make money married or single, in all branches of the arts and sciences, professions, trades, agricultural and mechanical pursuits. Hoping to offer hard facts about what women in the workforce would encounter, Penny had interviewed thousands of employers, using both a survey via the postal mail and in person – when she would also interview workers. Many of her site visits were in Philadelphia, New York and Boston. She distilled her research to list over 500 jobs that were open to women as well as the information about the jobs and potential availability for women. She also indicated when employers offered their reasons for wage differentials based on gender.

She dedicated her book "to worthy and industrious women in the United States, striving to earn a livelihood", and the book garnered much attention from reviewers and scholars across the country. She sold her rights to the book to another publisher who put it out as an encyclopedia, The Employments of Women: A Cyclopaedia of Woman's Work, in 1863. It sold better once it was re-titled again in 1870 as How Women Can Make Money, Married or Single. In its several different versions, 36 editions were published between 1862 and 2006, and six editions of the adaptation in German (first published in 1867).

In the twentieth century, division of labor by gender has been studied most systematically in women's studies (especially women's history, which has frequently examined the history and biography of women's participation in particular fields) and gender studies more broadly. Occupational studies, such as the history of medicine or studies of professionalization, also examine questions of gender, and the roles of women in the history of particular fields. Women dominate as accountants, auditors, and psychologists.

In addition, modern civil rights law has frequently examined gender restrictions of access to a field of occupation; gender discrimination within a field; and gender harassment in particular workplaces. This body of law is called employment discrimination law, and gender and race discrimination are the largest sub-sections within the area. Laws specifically aimed at preventing discrimination against women have been passed in many countries; see, e.g., the Pregnancy Discrimination Act in the United States.

== Women and economic development ==
Women in informal employment as share of female employment in 2017

Global research clearly delineates the correlation between women's role in the economy and an increase in the standard of living. In the 2001 World Bank report entitled "Engendering Development", the connection between women's involvement in the economy and growth is more clearly stated:

While disparities in basic rights; in schooling, credit, and jobs; or in the ability to participate in public life take their most direct toll on women and girls, the full costs of gender inequality ultimately harm everyone…ignoring gender disparities comes at a great cost—to people's well-being and to countries' abilities to grow sustainably, to govern effectively, and thus reduce poverty.

Society's intrinsic value is often associated with contribution and production as a whole, thus women's inability to participate in economy further solidifies a subordinate role in society. "The fact that women have fewer opportunities in labor market may contribute to their unequal treatment in the household…Increased opportunities for women in the labor market do indeed translate into better outcomes for women…For the same increase in total household income, an increase in female income of 7 U.S. dollars per month translates into a 1 percentage point increase in the survival rate for girls." Women are treated as less than men because their role in the home does not perpetuate survival of the family directly in terms of income. A stark realization of women's economic value in the eyes of under-developed countries is sex selective abortion rights and the alarming phenomenon of "missing women." What many societies fail to realize is that the trade-off to helping a woman instead of a man does not exist. When a woman is empowered with education and involvement in the economy everyone is better off. Women's economic involvement will drive up Gross Domestic Product (GDP) which is a foundational standard for higher living. James Wolfensohn of the World Bank states, "Education for girls has a catalytic effect on every dimension of development: lower child and maternal mortality rates; increased educational attainment by daughters and sons; higher productivity; and improved environmental management. Together, these can mean faster economic growth and, equally important, wider distribution of the fruits of growth… More education for girls will also enable more and more women to attain leadership positions at all levels of society: from health clinics in the villages to parliaments in the capitals. This, in turn, will change the way societies will deal with problems and raise the quality of global decision-making."

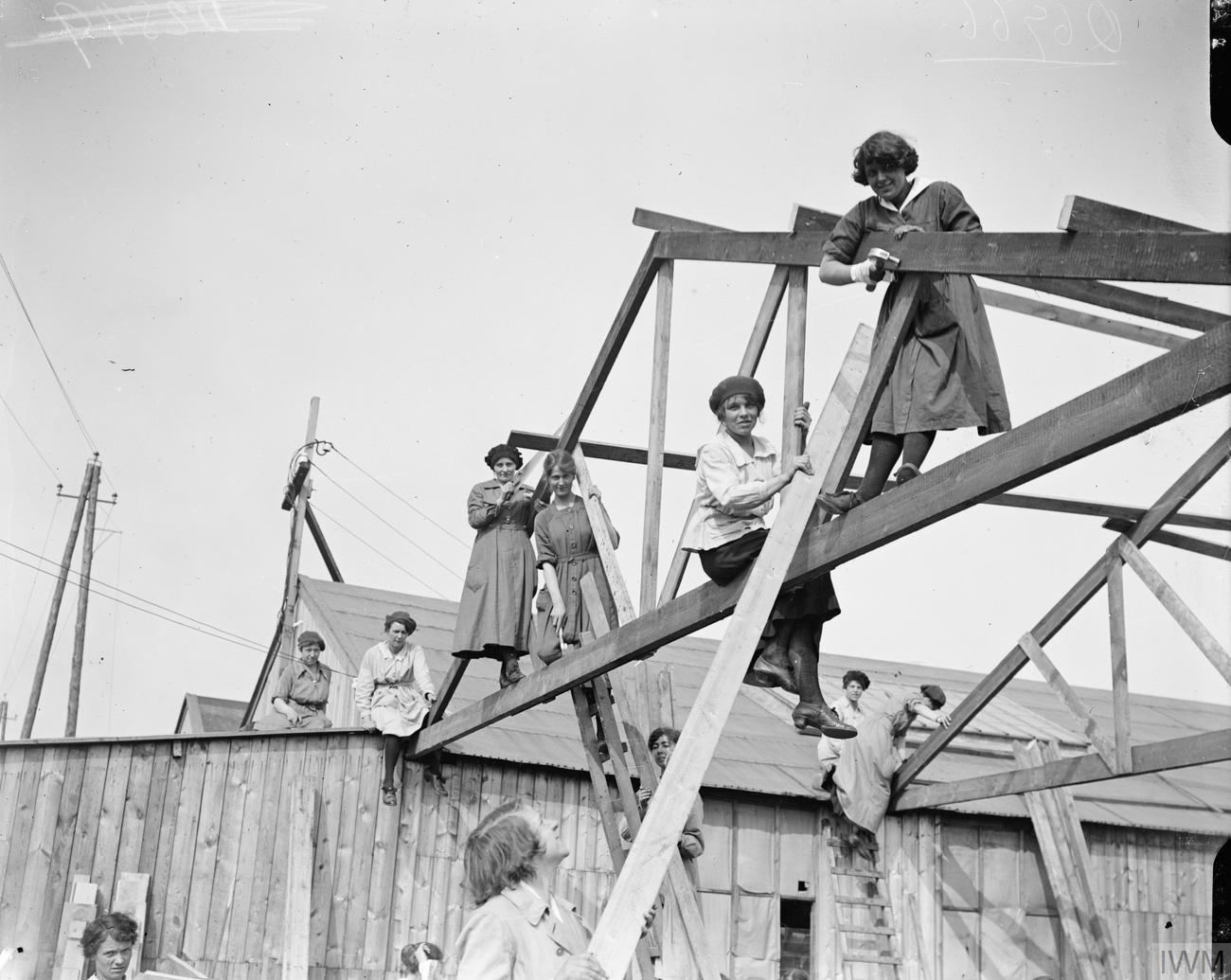
Women carpenters in France during World War I, June 1918

== Paid employment globally ==
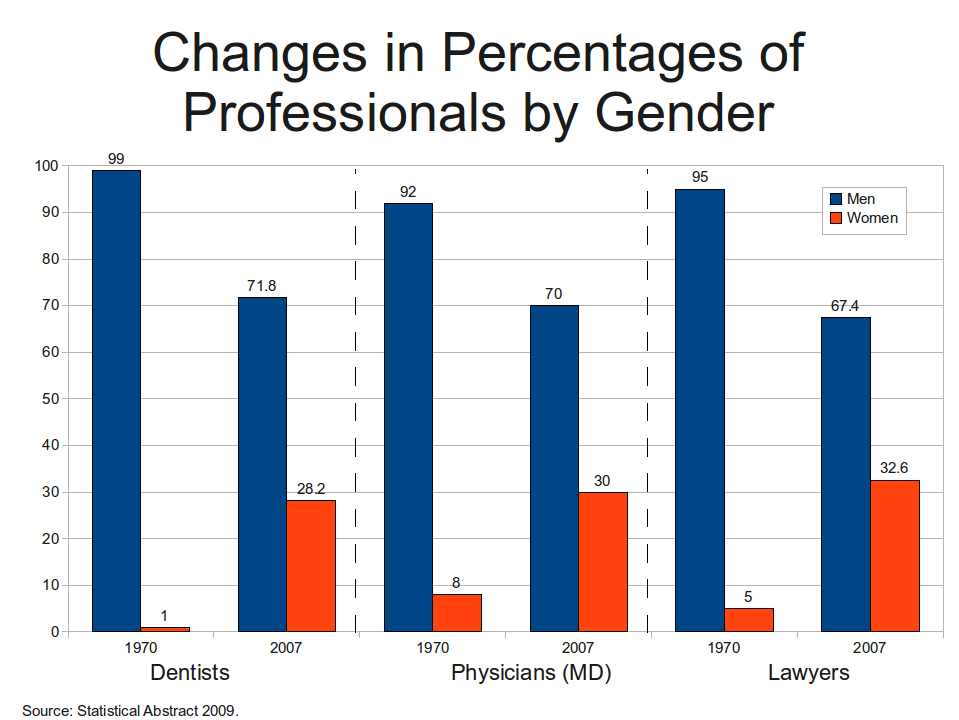
This chart depicts the change in the percentage of women in three professional occupations (dentist, physician, lawyer), from 1970 to 2007.

Women still contribute to their communities in many regions mainly through agricultural work. In Southern Asia, Western Asia, and Africa, only 20% of women work at paid non-agricultural jobs. Worldwide, women's rate of paid employment outside of agriculture grew to 41% by 2008.

One of the main forms of paid employment for women worldwide is actually a traditional one, that of the market "hawker". Women have worked outside the home as vendors at markets since ancient times in many parts of the world, such as Central America, South Asia, and Africa.

During the 20th century, the most significant global shift in women's paid employment came from the spread of global travel and the development of a large migrant workforce of women domestic workers seeking jobs outside of their native country. The Philippines is a major source of female domestic workers. Before the 1990s, the majority of Filipinos working outside the Philippines were male, but by 2012, an estimated 63% of Filipinos working overseas were female.

Estimates of Filipino women working overseas are in the millions. Over 138,000 new domestic workers gained permission to work overseas in 2012, a number that grew 12% from the previous year. Overseas employment often results in the women leaving their own children behind in the Philippines to be cared for by relatives. Domestic employees from the Philippines and other countries have also been subject to exploitation and sex and money extreme abuse, for example in several countries in the Middle East, where they are often employed. It is estimated that remittances from overseas workers (both male and female) bring $1 billion (USD) per month to the Philippines.

33% of the drivers and station controllers in the Bangalore metro are female in an effort to create a more welcoming and diverse workplace. Children of employees have access to childcare facilities, while women drivers can work at stations near to their homes and have access to a separate recreation area. If women are unable to perform night shifts, they work in the mornings or evenings.

=== Workforce participation by sector ===
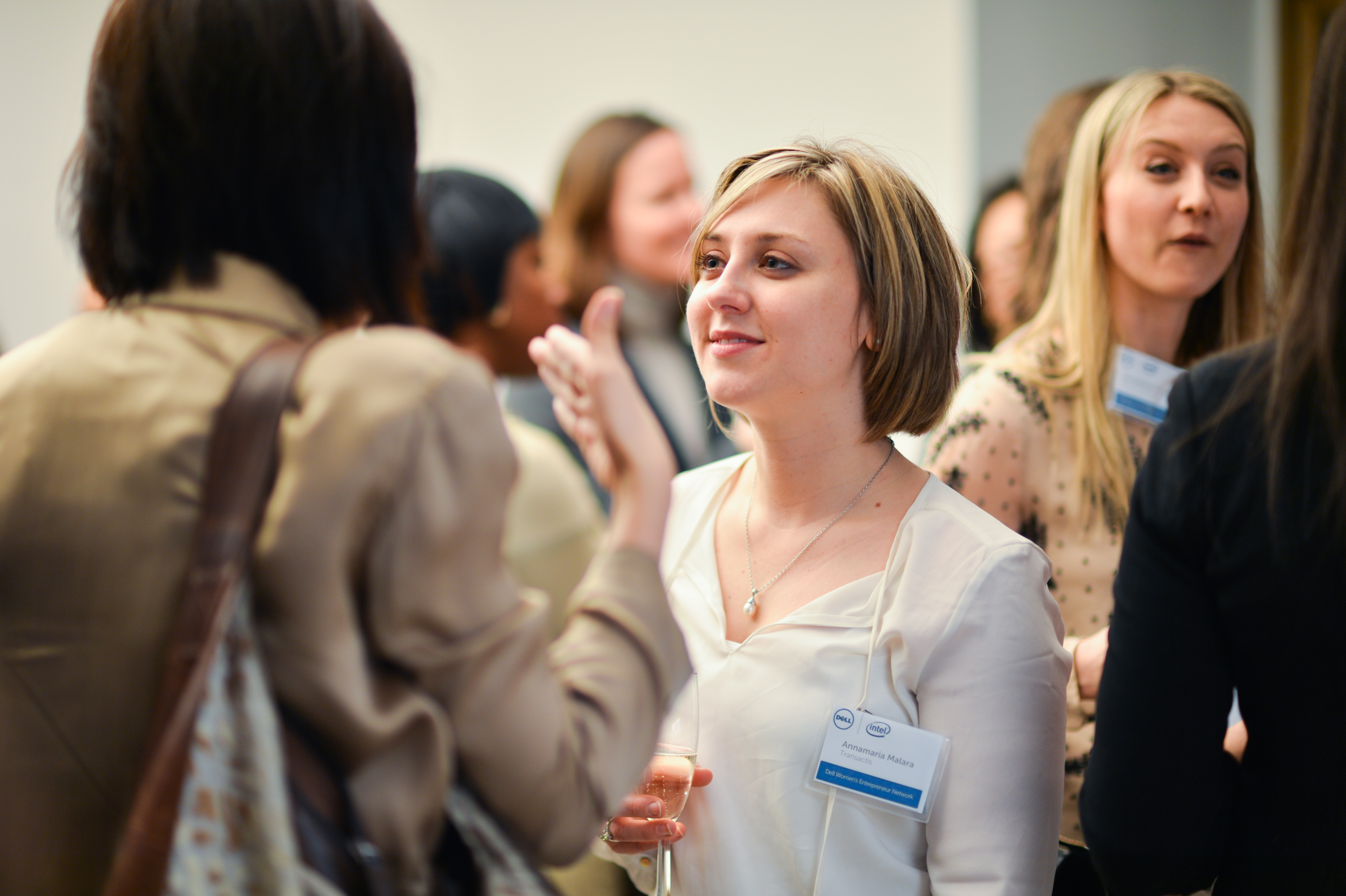
Attendees at a computer business networking event for potential entrepreneurs, United States

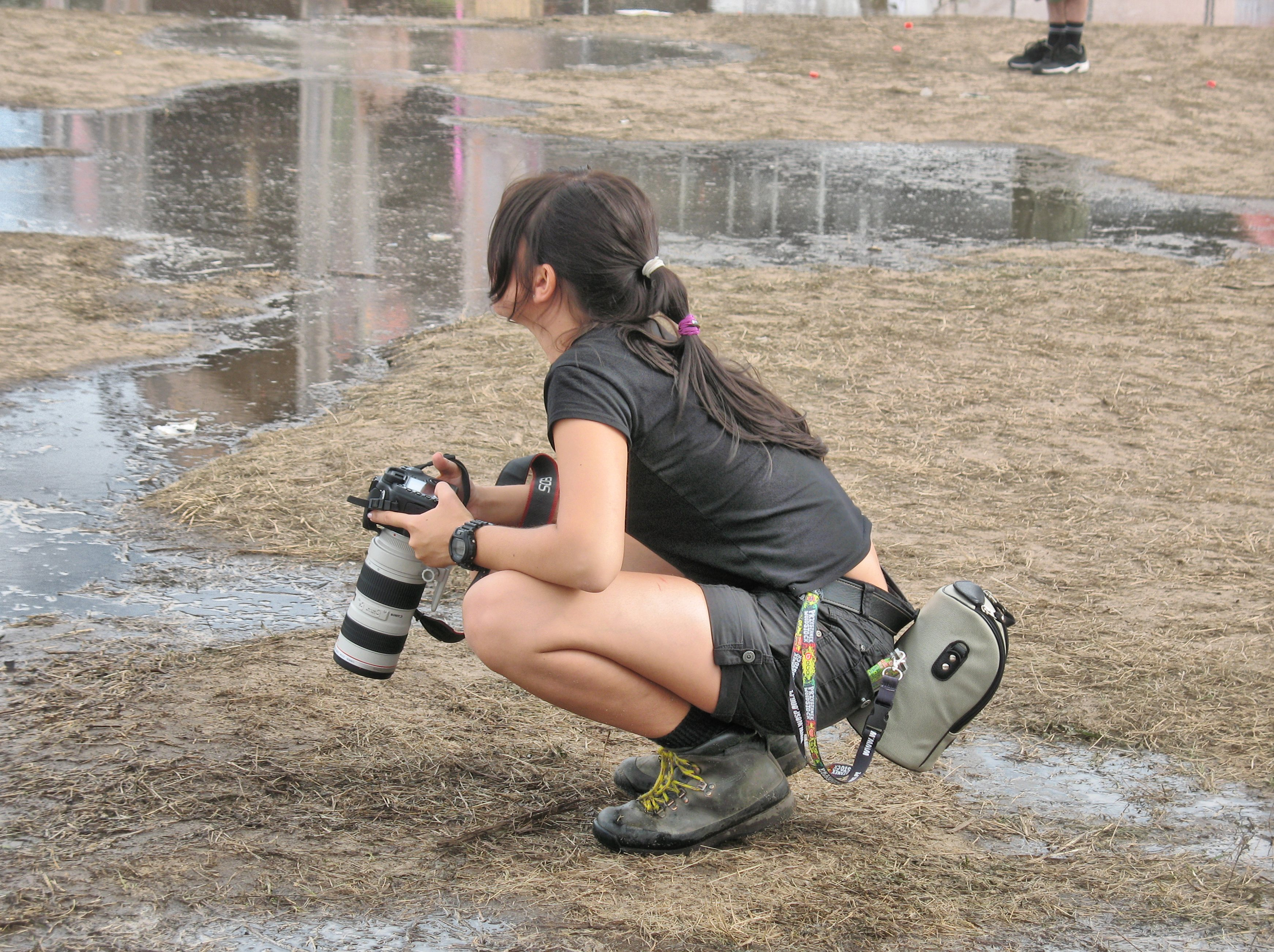
A woman press photographer covers a music festival, Poland, 2008

Women and men often participate in economic sectors in sharply different proportions, a result of gender clustering in occupations. Reasons for this may include a traditional association of certain types of work with a particular gender. There is a wide range of other possible economic, social and cultural variables that impact the gender distribution in different occupations, including within a region or country. An averaging of statistics gathered by the United Nations for 2004 through 2007 reflects these differences (totals may not add up to 100% due to rounding):

Sectoral distribution of employed persons, by sector and sex (2004 through 2007)

Region	Agriculture	Industry	Services
Africa	43% women / 42% men	11% women / 20% men	46% women / 39% men
Asia (excluding China)	32% women / 26% men	12% women / 25% men	56% women / 49% men
Latin America and the Caribbean	7% women / 22% men	13% women / 27% men	80% women / 51% men
Europe and other more developed regions	6% women / 8% men	15% women / 36% men	79% women / 55% men

More detailed statistics show large differences even within these regions. For example, 11% of employed women in East Asia are employed in agriculture, a number that rises to 55% in South Asia; 70% of women in Southern Africa are employed in the service sector, while in Eastern, Middle, and Western Africa this number is 26%.

According to the International Labour Organization, women's involvement in the labor force declines by 16.5% in developing nations as a result of unsafe public transportation.

=== Occupational dissimilarity index ===
Choice of occupation is considered to be one of the key factors contributing to the male-female wage differential. In other words, careers with a majority of female employees tend to pay less than careers that employ a majority of males. This is different from direct wage discrimination within occupations, as males in the female-dominated professions will also make lower than average wages and women in the male-dominated occupations usually make higher than average wages. The occupational dissimilarity index is a measure from 0 to 100; it measures the percent of laborers that would need to be rearranged into a job typically done by the opposite sex for the wage differential to disappear. In 1960, the dissimilarity index for the United States was measured at 62. It has dropped since then, but at 47 in 2000, is still one of the highest of any developed nation.

=== U-shaped curve ===
Claudia Goldin described women's participation rate in the workforce as a U-shaped curve. One that as a country develops, women's participation rate in the workforce starts high, declines, and then rises again. Its decline starts from a move from production in the household, family farm, or small business to a wider market. A strong social stigma of women working in paid manual labor outside of the home, not only in male-dominated industries, but also female-dominated industries such as textiles. Such stigma includes that only a lazy man (or of low social status/income) who neglects his family would let his wife do manual labor. The participation rate of women falls as the income rises, which even includes an increase in income for women's labor. Participation begins to rise once women's education improves and the value of women's time increases relative to the price of goods.

== Organizations formed by women for rights ==
In the nineteenth century women became involved in organizations dedicated to social reform. In 1903 The National Women's Trade Union League (WTUL) is established to advocate for improved wages and working conditions for women. In 1920 The Women's Bureau of the Department of Labor was formed to create equal rights and a safe workplace for women. In 1956 a group called Financial Women's Association (FWA), was formed. It is an organization established by a group of Wall Street women. The goal was: to advance professionalism in finance and in the financial services industry with special emphasis on the role and development of women, to attain greater recognition for women's achievements in business, and to encourage women to seek career opportunities in finance and business. In 1966 the National Organization for Women (NOW) was founded by a group of feminists including Betty Friedan. The largest women's rights group in the U.S., NOW seeks to end sexual discrimination, especially in the workplace, by means of legislative lobbying, litigation, and public demonstrations. NOW has 500,000 contributing members and 550 chapters in all 50 states and the District of Columbia. Founded in 1972, the National Association of Female Executives (NAFE) provides education, networking and public advocacy to empower its members to achieve career success and financial security. Members are women executives, business owners, entrepreneurs and others who are committed to NAFE's mission: the advancement of women in the workplace. Many of these organizations led to legal action and protecting women's rights as workers and empowered women in the workplace.

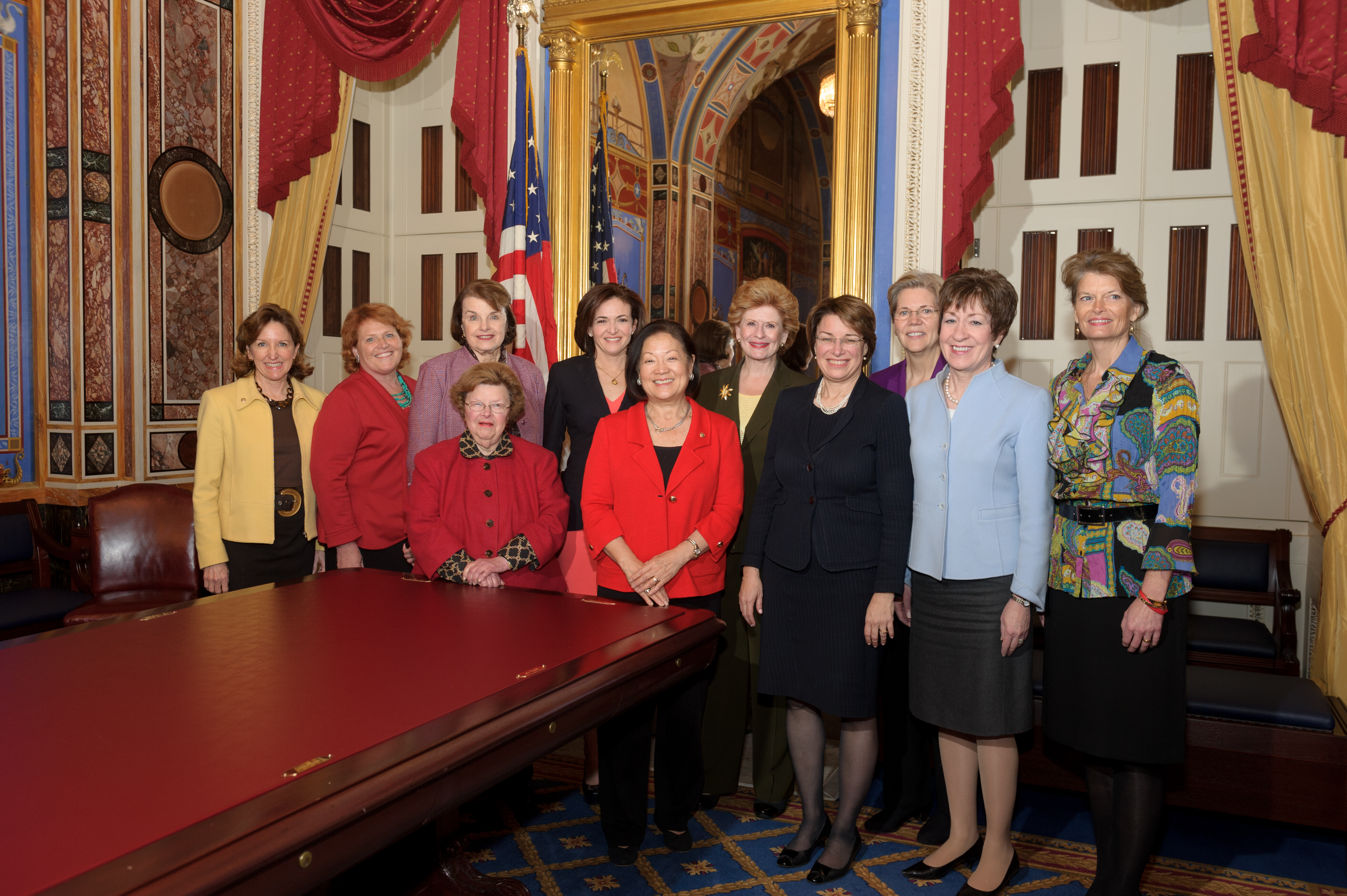
Facebook COO Sheryl Sandberg meeting with woman members of the U.S. Senate in 2013

In 2013, LeanIn.Org was founded by Sheryl Sandberg, who was at the time the chief operating officer of Meta Platforms, to support and inspire women to achieve their goals.

== Laws protecting women's rights as workers ==
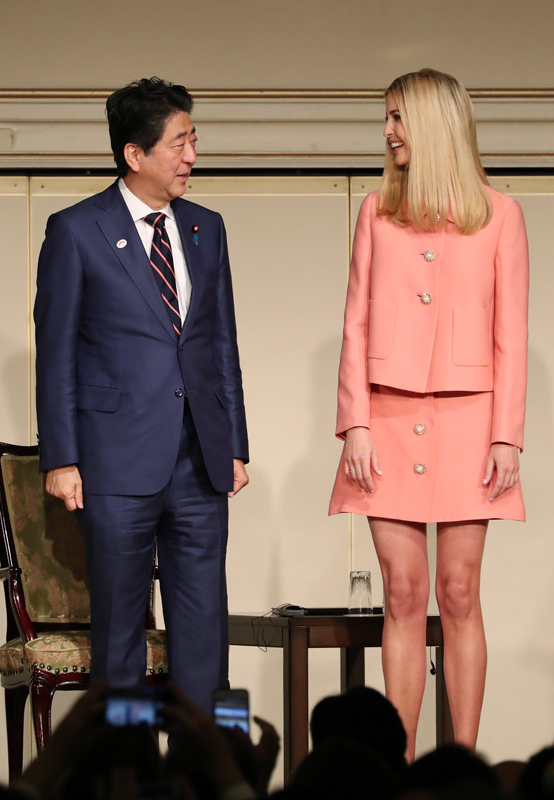
Japanese Prime Minister Shinzō Abe and Ivanka Trump, at the time advisor to her father U.S. president Donald Trump, attending the World Assembly for Women to discuss women's rights, Tokyo, 2017

International laws protecting women's rights as workers exist through the efforts of various international bodies. On June 16, 2011, the International Labour Organization (ILO) passed C189 Domestic Workers Convention, 2011, binding signatories to regulations intended to end abuses of migrant domestic workers. It was anticipated that the convention would put pressure on non-ratifying countries to support changes to their own laws to meet the change in international standards protecting domestic workers. Also in 2011, Hong Kong's High Court struck down a law preventing domestic workers from having residency rights granted to other foreign workers, a move that affected an estimated 100,000 domestic workers in Hong Kong.

The ILO has previously ratified the Equal Remuneration Convention in 1951, which came into force in 1953, the Discrimination (Employment and Occupation) Convention, which went into force in 1960 and the Maternity Protection Convention, 2000, which went into force in 2002. In 1966, the United Nations General Assembly adopted the International Covenant on Economic, Social and Cultural Rights, which went into force in 1976. UNESCO also adopted the Convention against Discrimination in Education in 1960, which came into force in 1962. The International Convention on the Protection of the Rights of All Migrant Workers and Members of Their Families, adopted by the United Nations General Assembly, went into force in 2003. The Home Work Convention, adopted by the ILO, went into force in 2000;the Convention protects the rights of persons doing paid work out of their home, which is frequently women workers. It offers equal protection regarding working conditions, safety, remuneration, social security protection, access to training, minimum age of employment, and maternity protection.

Human trafficking often targets young women who are abducted and sent outside their own country to work as domestic workers, often in conditions of extreme exploitation. As of 2020, 1 out of every 130 women globally are victims of this form of "modern slavery". A number of international laws have been ratified to address human trafficking of women and children.

Maternity protection measures are put in place to insure that women will not be discriminated against in the workplace once they return from having a child. They should also not be exposed to any health hazards while they are pregnant and at work. They are allowed time off for maternity leave as well, which allows them to bond with their child; this aspect of development is crucial for infants to gain proper attachment skills. Employers are expected to hold to these policies. Yet many women on maternity leave receive very small amounts of time off to allow for their health along with their babies' health. The amount of time allowed for maternity leave as well as the pay for maternity leave varies by country, with Sweden having the longest amount off with 68 weeks and the United States being one of the worst, with the typical period being 12 weeks without pay.

== Women in workforce leadership ==
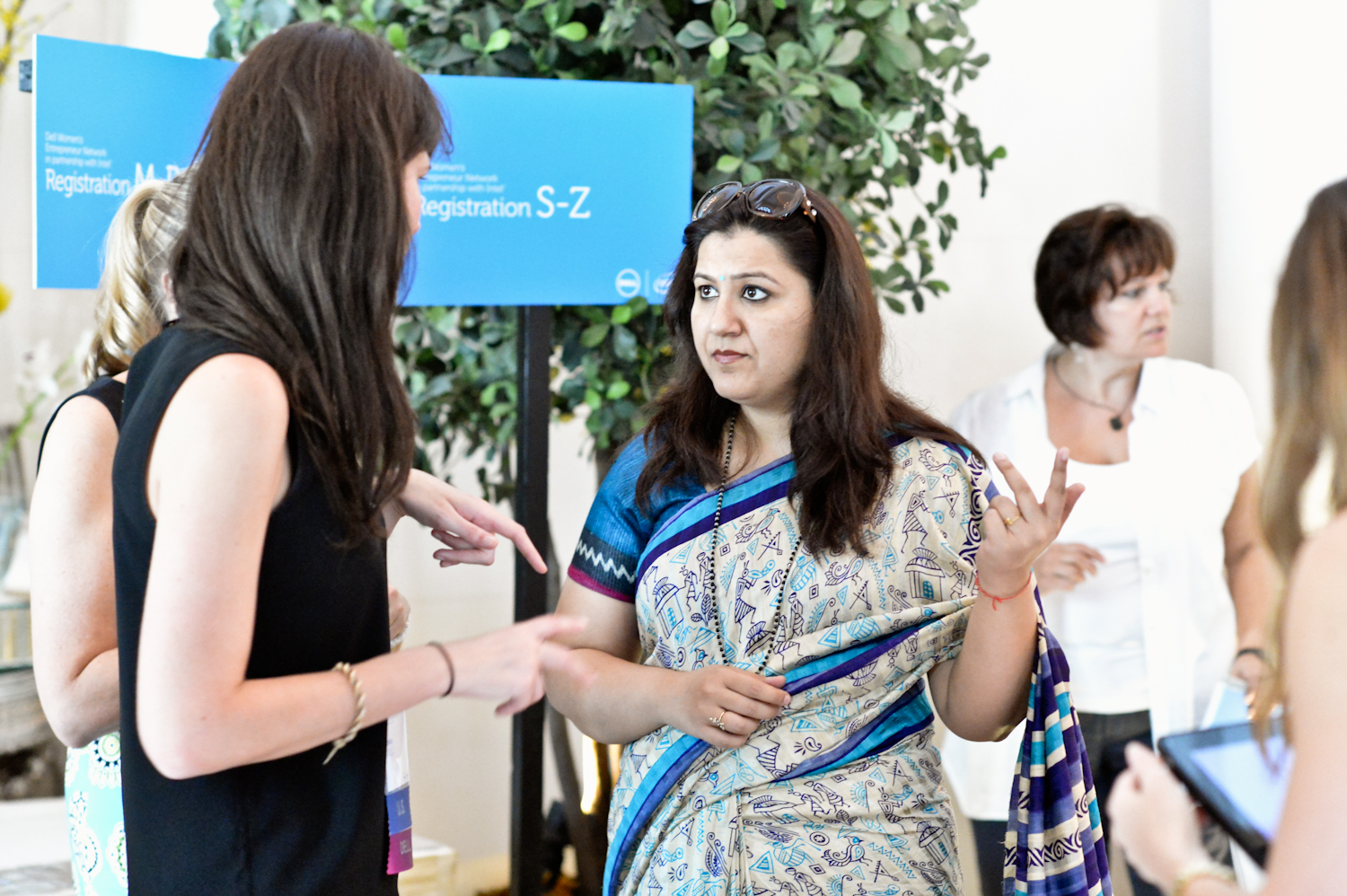
An information technology networking social for potential entrepreneurs in New Delhi, India

Female decision-makers from around Europe are organized in several national and European wide networks. The networks aim to promote women in decision-making positions in politics and the economy across Europe. These networks were founded in the 1980s and are often very different from the "service clubs" founded in the early days of the century, like Soroptimist and Zontas.

"Women in Management" is about women in business in usually male-dominated areas. Their motivation, their ideas and leadership styles and their ability to enter into leadership positions is the subject of most of the different networks.

As of 2009, women represented 20.9% of parliament in Europe (both houses) and 18.4% world average.

As of 2009, 90 women serve in the U.S. Congress: 18 women serve in the Senate, and 73 women serve in the House Women hold about three percent of executive positions.

In the private sector, men still represent 9 out of 10 board members in European blue-chip companies, The discrepancy is widest at the very top: only 3% of these companies have a woman presiding over the highest decision-making body. In the United States, women make up just 5.5% of company CEOs.

List of members of the European Network of Women in Decision-making in Politics and the Economy:

- Committee of Women Elected Representatives of Local and Regional Authorities (Council of European Municipalities and Regions)
- BPW Europe, Business and Professional Women – Europe
- Association of Organisations of Mediterranean Businesswomen
- Eurochambres Women's Network
- European Platform of Women Scientists
- Network of Parliamentary Committees for Equal Opportunities for Women and Men in the European Union
- European Network to Promote Women's Entrepreneurship
- European Women's Lobby
- European Women's Lawyers Association
- CEE Network for Gender Issues
- European Women Inventors and Innovators Network
- European Women's Management Development International Network, EWMD
- Femanet – Eurocadres
- European Professional Women's Network, EPWN
- Women's Forum for the Economy and the Society

The European Union Commission has created a platform for all these networks. It also funded the Women to the Top program in 2003–2005 to bring more women into top management.

Some organizations have been created to promote the presence of women in top responsibilities, in politics and business. One example is EWMD European Women's Management Development (cited above), a European and international network of individual and corporate members, drawn from professional organisations. Members are from all areas of business, education, politics and culture.

Women who are born into the upper class rather than the middle or lower class have a much better chance at holding higher positions of power in the work force if they choose to enter it. According to a study published 2015, of the women who held C-suite jobs in the U.S., 94% played competitive sports, 52% at a university level.

== Barriers to equal participation ==
What percentage of the US public approves of working wives

As gender roles have followed the formation of agricultural and then industrial societies, newly developed professions and fields of occupation have been frequently inflected by gender. Some of the ways in which gender affects a field include:

- Prohibitions or restrictions on members of a particular gender entering a field or studying a field
- Discrimination within a field, including wage, management, and prestige hierarchies
- Expectation that mothers, rather than fathers, should be the primary childcare providers

Note that these gender restrictions may not be universal in time and place, and that they operate to restrict both men and women. However, in practice, norms and laws have historically restricted women's access to particular occupations;civil rights laws and cases have thus primarily focused on equal access to and participation by women in the workforce. These barriers may also be manifested in hidden bias and by means of many microinequities.

Many women face issues with sexual abuse while working in agriculture fields as well. Many of the women who work in these fields are undocumented and so supervisors or other male workers may take advantage of that. These women may suffer sexual abuse in order to keep their jobs and they cannot report the incident to the police because the fact that they are undocumented will be brought up and as a result they may be deported.

Across the board, a number of industries are stratified across the genders. This is the result of a variety of factors. These include differences in education choices, preferred job and industry, work experience, number of hours worked, and breaks in employment (such as for bearing and raising children). Men also typically go into higher paid and higher risk jobs when compared to women. These factors result in 60% to 75% difference between men's and women's average aggregate wages or salaries, depending on the source. Various explanations for the remaining 25% to 40% have been suggested, including women's lower willingness and ability to negotiate salary and sexual discrimination. According to the European Commission direct discrimination only explains a small part of gender wage differences. Despite these barriers, digitalization has helped reduce obstacles to women's participation by enabling the inclusion of low-skilled and traditionally marginalized groups, such as women, people with disabilities, and low-income workers. In many Muslim-majority countries, social and cultural norms restricting interaction between men and women have historically limited female labor force participation, particularly in management roles. Digital platforms now offer alternative avenues, such as remote work, to overcome these constraints.

=== Women who want to work with children ===
In the United States, the gender pay gap has not been closed for 3 decades. It has been continuous for the past 3 decades at about $0.80 per dollar of what the man makes. While we notice there is a pay gap within men and women, there is a different level of work labor participation for the working mother, married and single. While the married mother has another source of income, the single mother tends to have a higher chance of poverty. Being limited to work of take more leave.

=== Access to education and training ===
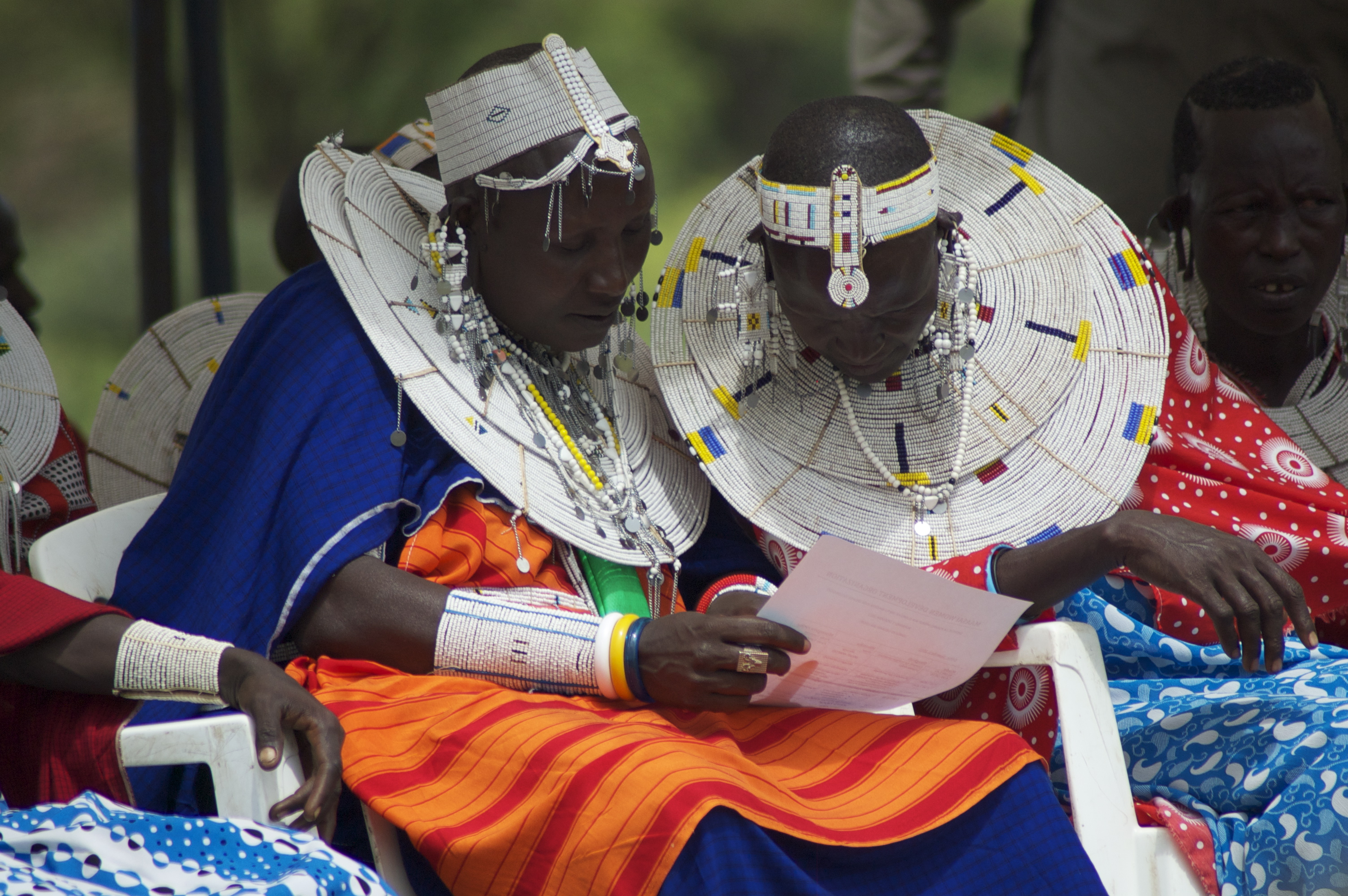
Maasai women at USAID literacy event

A number of occupations became "professionalized" through the 19th and 20th centuries, gaining regulatory bodies, and passing laws or regulations requiring particular higher educational requirements. As women's access to higher education was often limited, this effectively restricted women's participation in these professionalizing occupations. For instance, women were completely forbidden access to Cambridge University until 1868, and were encumbered with a variety of restrictions until 1987 when the university adopted an equal opportunity policy. Numerous other institutions in the United States and Western Europe began opening their doors to women over the same period of time, but access to higher education remains a significant barrier to women's full participation in the workforce in developing countries. Even where access to higher education is formally available, women's access to the full range of occupational choices is significantly limited where access to primary education is limited through social custom.

In low- and middle-income countries, vocational and business training program interventions are carried out with the aim of increasing employment, self-employment and income. A systematic review on vocational and business training for women in these regions summarized the evidence from thirty-five studies regarding the impacts of such training programs. The authors found that these types of programs have small positive effects on employment and income with variability across studies. They found that the effects of training may increase with a stronger gender focus of the program.

According to FAO, in Africa, without adequate training and education in business, entrepreneurial skills, and awareness of trade issues and regulations and fluency in languages of trading partners, women will struggle to gain access to formalized economies and larger scale businesses. Low literacy levels often limit women to informal economic activity.

=== Access to capital and rotating capital ===
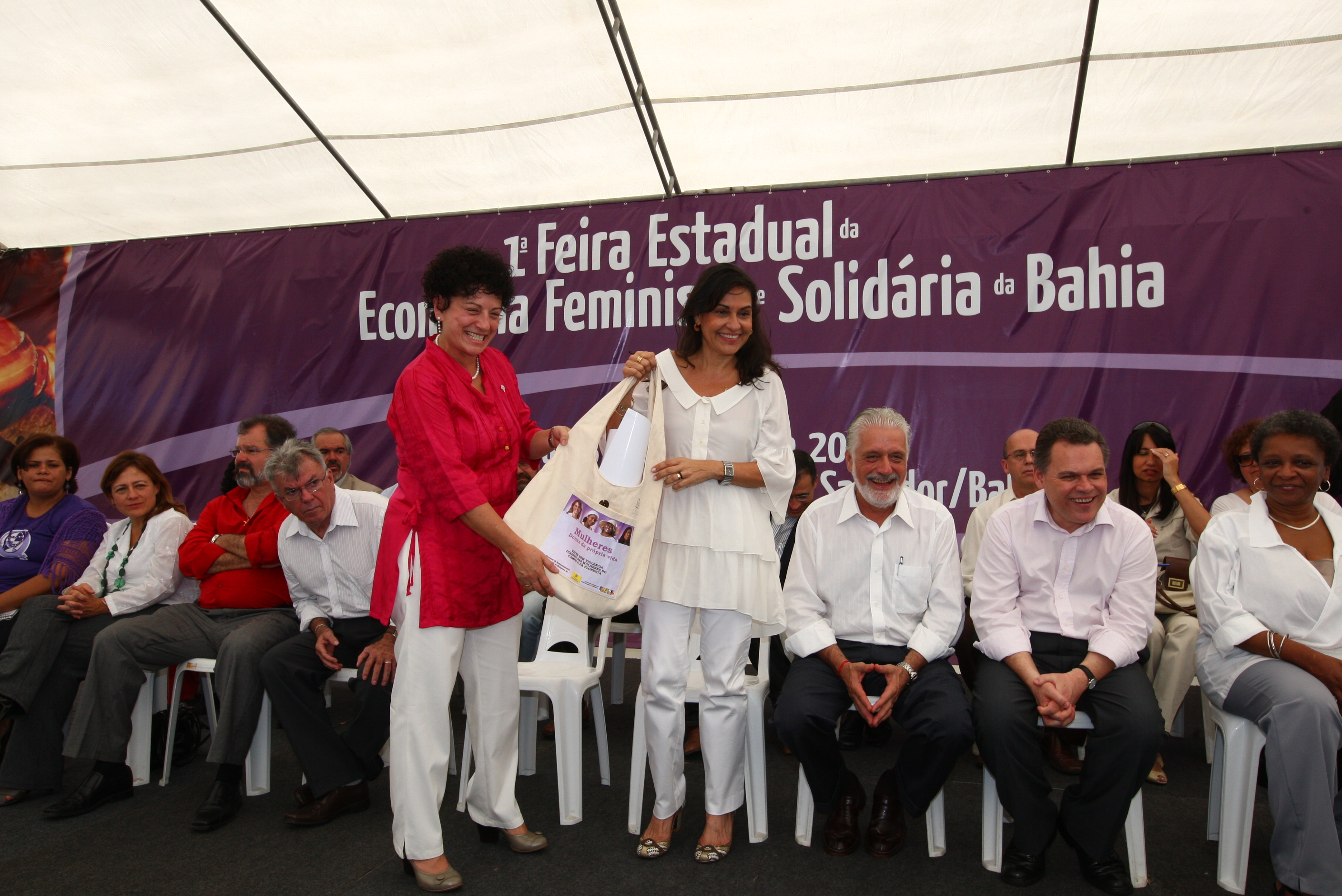
Governor of Bahia, Brazil, attending the first state women's business conference

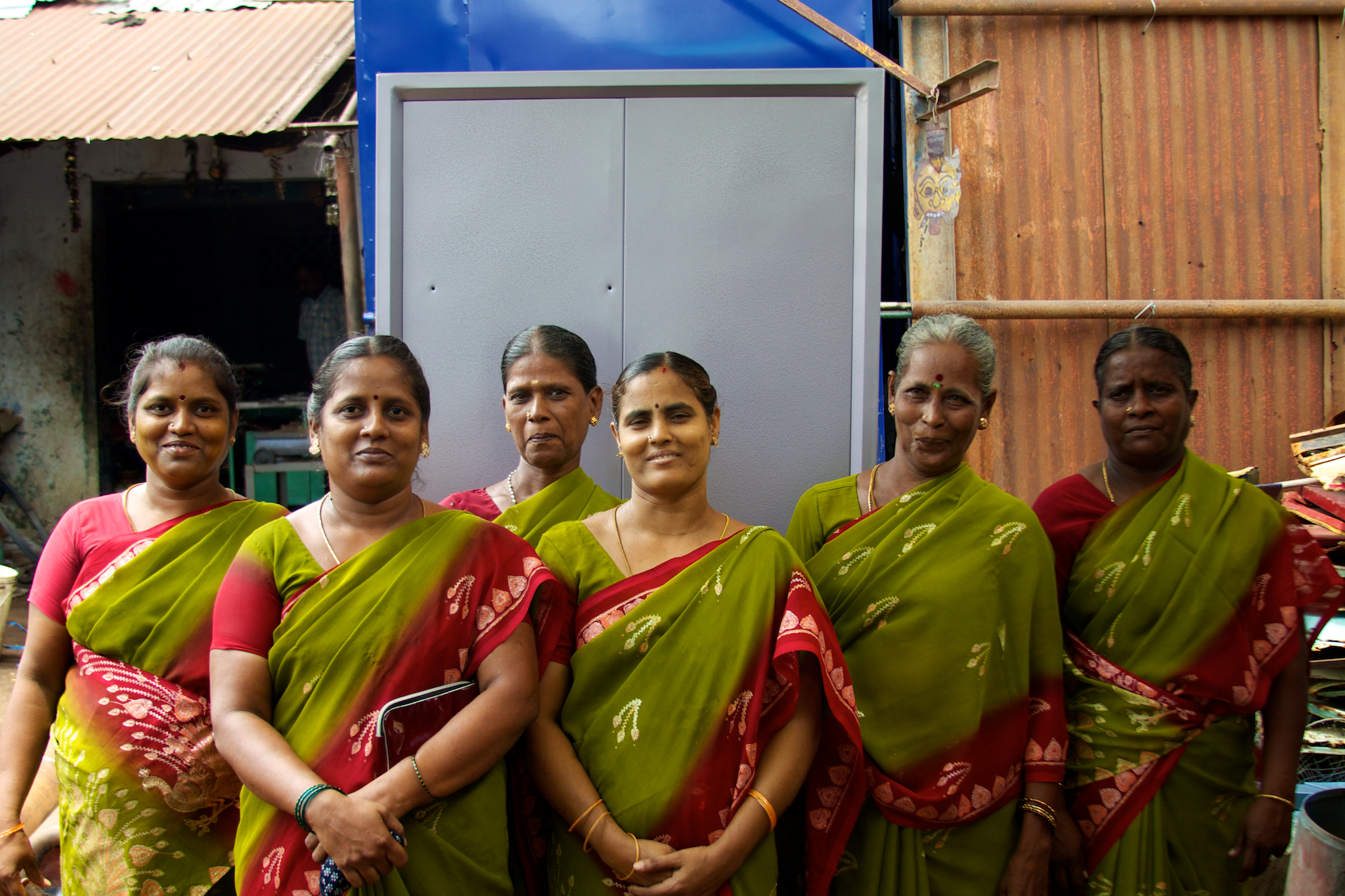
SHG women operating a cabinet manufacturing business, India

Women's access to occupations requiring capital outlays is also hindered by their unequal access (statistically) to capital; this affects occupations such as entrepreneur and small business owner, farm ownership, and investor. Numerous microloan programs attempt to redress this imbalance, targeting women for loans or grants to establish start-up businesses or farms, having determined that aid targeted to women can disproportionately benefit a nation's economy. While research has shown that women cultivate more than half the world's food—in sub-Saharan Africa and the Caribbean, women are responsible for up to 80% of food production—most such work is family subsistence labor, and often the family property is legally owned by the men in the family.

In Africa, women have limited access to financial services and formalized assets such as titles and deeds; this results in low levels of investment in productive capacity, hampering the growth of women-led micro, small, or medium-sized enterprises (MSMEs). Alleviating financial collateral constraints can allow more women producers and traders to participate in formal markets and expand their businesses. According to a study conducted on women and informal cross-border trade (ICBT) in Southern Africa, women are consistently found to rely on their own personal savings and women "savings clubs" (technically, rotating savings and credit associations) to source capital for trade as opposed to commercial banks and government programmes. Similar patterns have been observed in China, and Korea. Rotating capital has also been observed across religious groups, such as Muslim women. The European Investment Bank established the SheInvest program at the end of 2019 with the goal of raising €1 billion in investments to assist women in obtaining loans and running enterprises across Africa. The Bank has funded an additional €2 billion in gender-lens investment in Africa, Asia, and Latin America at the Finance in Common Summit at the end of 2022.

A 2025 report by the Danish Chamber of Commerce based on numbers by Statistics Denmark showed that, in the years 2017 to 2023, between 0.1-1.7% of capital went to startups with exclusively female founders, while between 3.7-10.8 % of the capital went to startups with a mix of both genders, with the remaining capital going to startups with exclusively male founders.

=== Discrimination within occupations ===
Unemployment rate in women in 2017

According to United Nations data, the average unemployment rate by sex and age group (15 years and over) for the year 2021 was 8.7 percent for the female population worldwide, whereas it was 6.7 percent for the male population, marking a discrepancy of almost 30 percent. G20 countries, which represent the major economic markets worldwide, reflect this trend as well, though to a lesser extent. Within the G20 countries, Saudi Arabia has the greatest discrepancy between the unemployment rates of the genders (see the graphical representation: "Unemployment Rate by Sex and Age Group in G20 Countries in 2021").

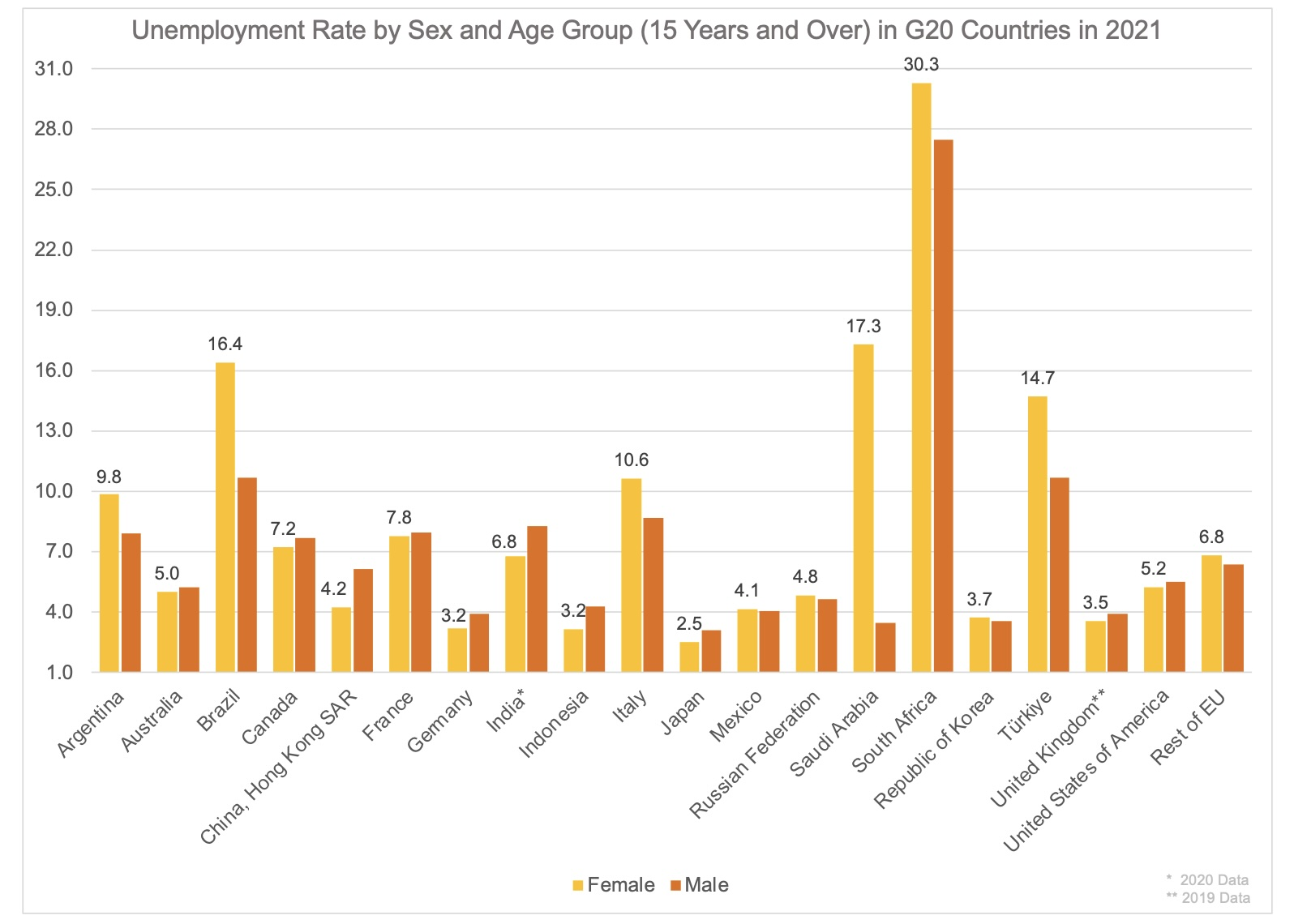
Unemployment Rate by Sex and Age Group (15 Years and Over) in G20 Countries in 2021

The idea that men and women are naturally suited for different occupations is known as horizontal segregation.

Statistical discrimination in the workplace is unintentional discrimination based on the presumed probability that a worker will or will not remain with the company for a long period of time. Specific to women, employers believe that women are more likely to drop out of the labor force to have kids, or work part-time while raising kids; this tends to hurt chances for job advancement. Women are passed up for promotions because of the possibility that they may leave, and are in some cases placed in positions with little opportunity for upward mobility due to these stereotypes.

Women typically earn less money on average than men (not accounting other variables), despite establishing equal pay laws.

The gender wage gap which is calculated by the difference between the median earnings of men and women is an indicator followed by OECD. In 2022, the average gender wage gap (as percent of median earnings of men) among OECD countries in 2022 was 11.4 percent. According to the OECD data, in the last couple of years, Luxembourg has had the smallest gender wage gap (0.4 percent), while Korea has had the largest (33.2 percent) (see the graphical representation: "Gender Wage Gap in Selected OECD Countries").

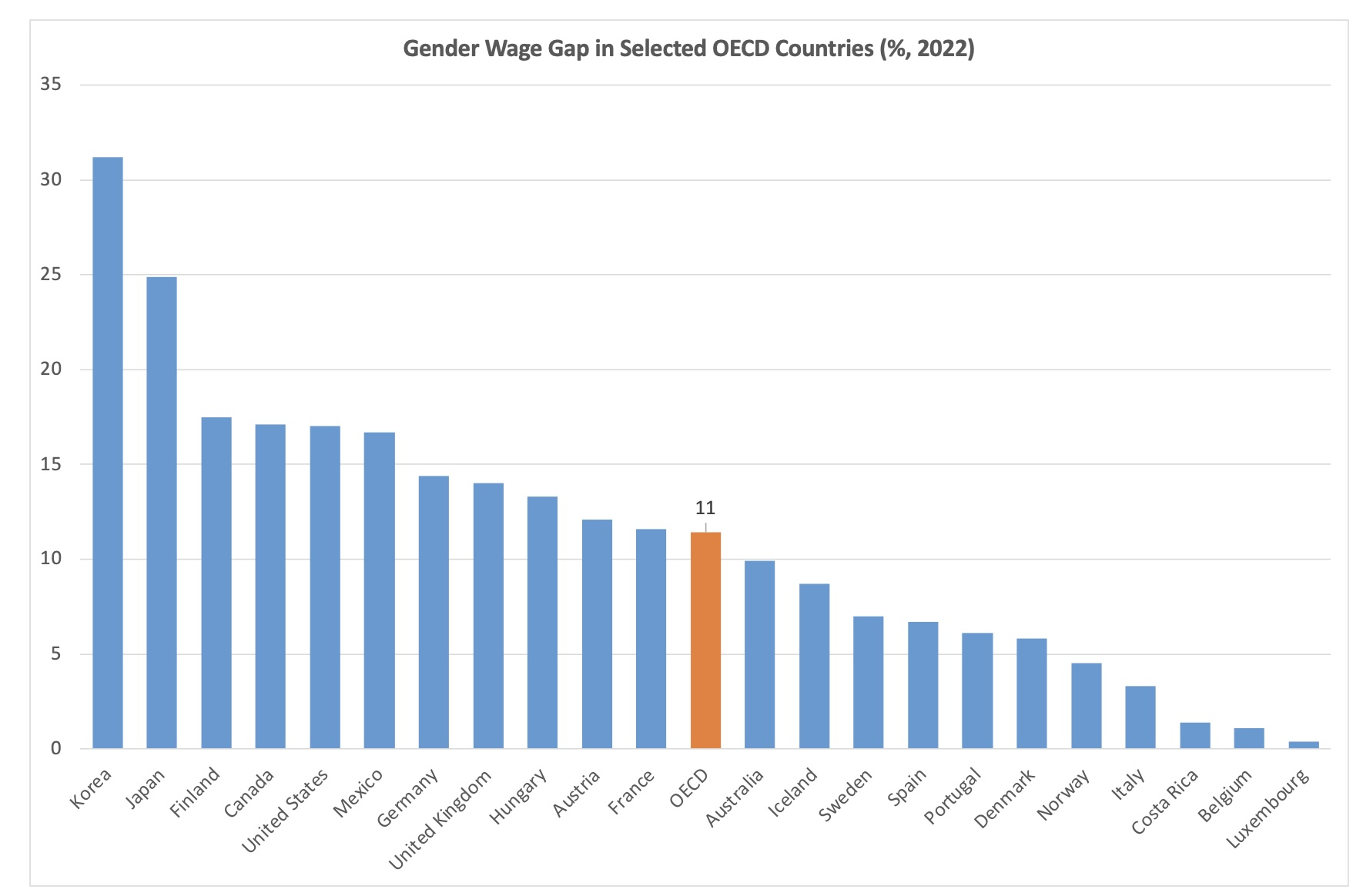
Gender Wage Gap in Selected OECD Countries (%, 2022)

According to the textbook Race, Class, and Gender: An Anthology, women are at a higher risk of financial disadvantage in modern-day society than men. Statistical findings suggest that women are under paid for similar jobs men complete despite having the same qualifications. The statistical data collected by the U.S. Department of Labor suggests that women are discriminated against in the workforce based on gender. The textbook reads, "Women's wages are also more volatile than men's wages, and women face a much higher risk of seeing large drops in income than do men" (Kennedy 2008). Anderson clearly demonstrates a significant difference between men and women in the workforce in regards to pay. Women are left more exposed to financial devastation and unemployment. The textbook also mentions that women are often given public positions versus private or leadership positions despite having appropriate work experience, higher education, or necessary skills to qualify. According to the Joint Economic Committee, "Among women heading families, the unemployment rate has grown and is higher than the national unemployment rate and twice as high as that for either married men or married women" (Joint Economic Committee, 2009). In other words, unmarried women who are the head of household are more vulnerable to financial disadvantage than married men or women. The unemployment rate of women compared to men suggests that single women are discriminated against based on gender. Anderson writes, "All women are disproportionately at risk in the current foreclosure crisis, since women are 32% more likely than men to have subprime mortgages (One-third of women, compared to one-fourth of men, have subprime mortgages; and, the disparity between women and men increases in higher income brackets)" (Anderson 265). The statistical information illustrates the dramatic difference between men and women in regards to finances. It can be inferred that men are favored in the workforce over women. Women are discriminated against based on their gender and thus are more likely to struggle financially because of discriminatory employers.

Sex differentiation focuses on separating men and women in the workplace from different settings and duties, and it leads to the idea of sex segregation. Explanations for sex segregation fall under two main categories of cultural beliefs and men's efforts to preserve their advantages in the workplace. Cultural beliefs about gender and work emphasize sex stereotypes. Certain cultures value these sex stereotypes, assumptions about individuals based on sex, which leads to stereotype thinking about the genders. Jobs become labeled male or female when these sex stereotypes relate to the sexes. Cultural beliefs for sexes lays out the inequality at work women face. In Western and Eastern cultures, men are believed to be superior to women, leading to sex inequality in job duties, authority, and pay. Women are seen as requiring protection and care, and it takes away their opportunities at many jobs.

Another explanation of sex inequality is that the dominant group will preserve their position, such as men's efforts to preserve their advantages in the workplace. If women are capable of taking on the duties of male dominated jobs, especially "macho" jobs, then men's masculinity will no longer be a requirement. Women gaining equality in the workforce threatens undermining men's privileges in any other realm they wish, such as authority, family, or political life. Sometimes the solution men choose is to try to drive the women out of the job. Women are 41% more likely to be subjected to a toxic workplace culture and are more likely to be burned out than men.

Women, globally, are also responsible for nearly "two and a half times more unpaid household and care [labour] than men". These higher care labour responsibilities for women along with increasing participation in the labour market is creating a strain on women that has negative implications on their ability to properly provide for their families. Larger care labour responsibilities for women can also have negative impacts on their ability to participate in the paid labour market and achieve "their full economic potential". In addition to women performing more unpaid care work, they also make up the majority of single parent households, "8% of householders are headed by single parents, with 84% of them mothers". This unequal distribution of care labour is a significant factor in reducing the economic ability of women in the workforce.

Women bear a disproportionate burden when it comes to unpaid work. In the Asia and Pacific region, women spend 4.1 times more time in unpaid work than men do. Additionally, looking at 2019 data by the OECD (Organization for Economic Co-operation and Development) countries, the average time women spent in unpaid work is 264 minutes per day compared to men who spent 136 minutes per day. Although men spend more time in paid work, women still spend more time, in general, doing both paid and unpaid work. The numbers are 482.5 minutes per day for women and 454.4 minutes per day for men. These statistics show us that there is a double burden for women.

According to The Lancet Regional Health - Europe, only 29.8% of the authors of scientific articles are women, while only 17% of women occupy the highest positions in academic research. They make up just 30% of the research workforce and occupy only 26% of full professorships, while the highest positions in academic careers are held by women in 22% of cases for the natural sciences and 17% for engineering and technology.

=== Actions and inactions of women themselves ===
Through a process known as "employee clustering", employees tend to be grouped throughout the workplace both spatially and socially with those of a similar status job. Women are no exception and tend to be grouped with other women making comparable amounts of money. They compare wages with the women around them and believe their salaries are fair because they are average. Some women are content with their lack of wage equality with men in the same positions because they are unaware of just how vast the inequality is.

Furthermore, women as a whole tend to be less assertive and confrontational. One of the factors contributing to the higher proportion of raises going to men is the simple fact that men tend to ask for raises more often than women, and are more aggressive when doing so. Women, and men, are socialized at young ages into these roles. School-age boys and girls in the United States have been noted as enacting the same aggressive and passive characteristics, respectively, in educational settings that we see in adults in the workplace. According to Joan Spade, boys are more likely to be pushed competitively in school, and sports, to be dominant. The idea that "winning is everything" is not emphasized to the same extent for girls and therefore they are less likely to seek recognition for their work.

An additional issue that contributes to income inequality by gender is that women are much more likely than men to take "breaks" in their careers to have children, often remaining out of the workforce for extended periods of time, while men in the same role or occupation (or other women who do not leave the workforce) most likely are continuing to earn promotions and/or male-favoring merit-based salary increases. When a woman in this scenario re-enters the workforce, she may be offered a smaller salary or a lower position than she might have merited had she remained in the workforce alongside her colleagues (both male and female) who have not interrupted their careers.

=== Sex segregation ===
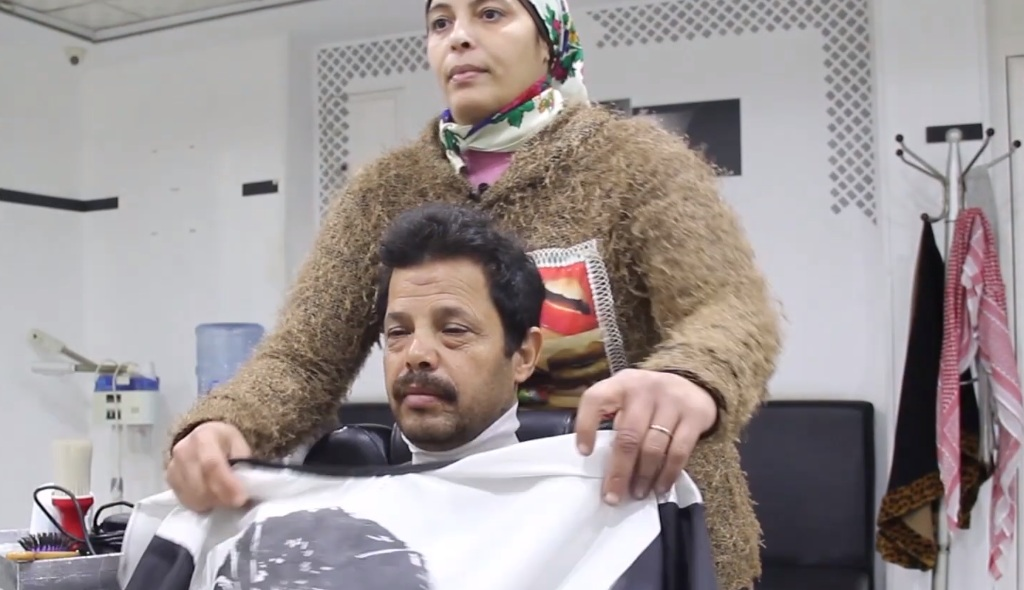
An Egyptian Muslim woman who works in a men's hairdresser, 2020

A form of discrimination in the workplace is sex segregation. Men and women are separated to do different tasks, same tasks in different settings or at different times. Historically, most men did agricultural work while women managed the household, however within time women eased their way into employment, but the segregation they experience remained. Males identify with the masculine identity and their authority are considered appropriate. Male dominated industries do not leave a chance for women to prove possible history in the role, leaving the job identified as a male way of working. Males masculine behavior undermine females in the workforce, and they are forced to endure it. Women's segregation in the workforce takes form of normative masculine cultural dominance. Men put on the image of macho physical toughness, limiting women in their careers. Women find themselves experiencing the concept of "doing gender", especially in a traditional masculine occupation. Women's standpoint of men's behavior sheds light on mobilizing masculinity. With the feminist standpoint view of gender in the workplace, men's gender is an advantage, whereas women's is a handicap. However, sex segregation can happen by women's and men's own choices of different occupations.

Descriptive gender stereotypes emphasize the characteristics a woman possesses. The prescriptive component focuses on the beliefs about characteristics a woman should possess. The descriptive component is expected to lead to workplace discrimination, while the prescriptive component is expected to lead to discrimination against women. If women violate these prescriptions, they are more susceptible to disparate treatment. In other words, if a woman is able to perform a job that generally requires stereotypical male masculinity they receive the discrimination that punishes women for violating the prescriptions of feminine characteristics.

== Gender inequality by social class ==
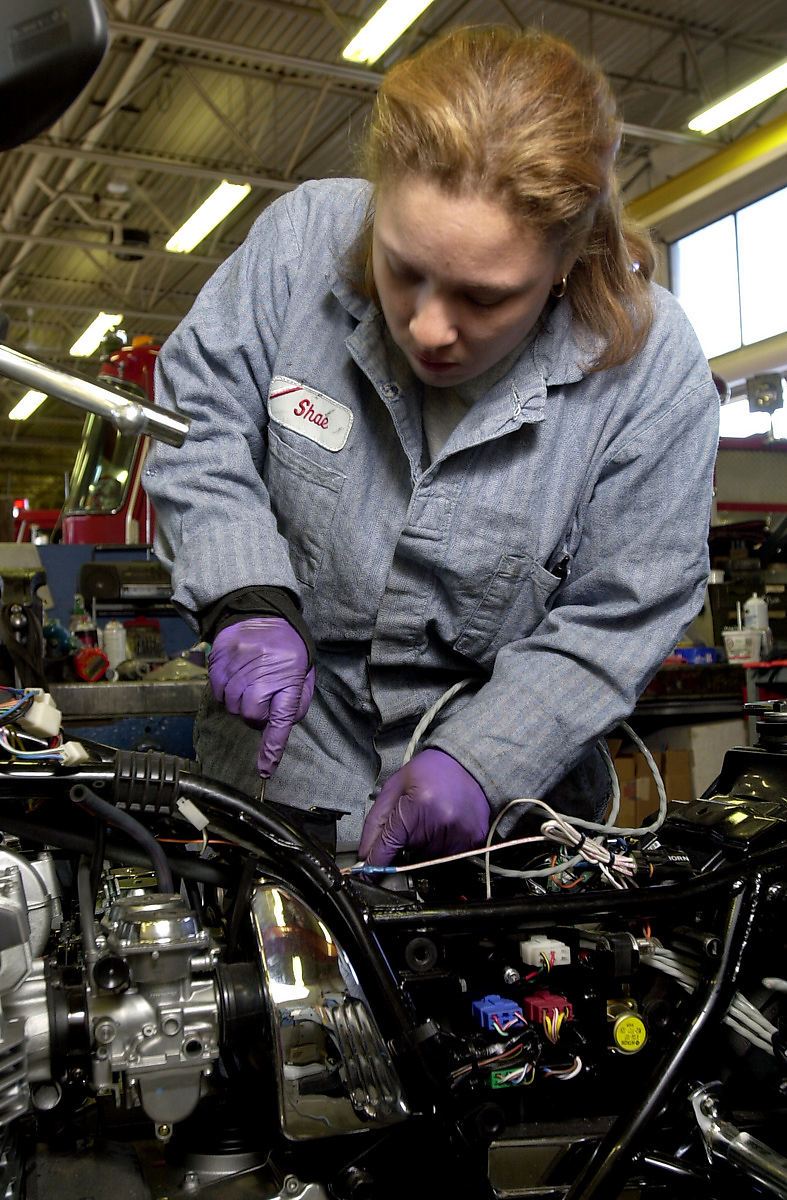
Mechanic working on a motorcycle, United States

In the last 50 years, there have been great changes toward gender equality in industrialized nations, such as the United States of America. With the second wave feminist movement of the 1960s, women began to enter the workforce in great numbers. Women also had high labor market participation during World Wars. In the late 1960s when women began entering the labor force in record numbers, they were entering in addition to all of the men, as opposed to substituting for men during the war. This dynamic shift from the one-earner household to the two-earner household dramatically changed the socioeconomic class system of industrialized nations in the post-war period.

When the United States mandated a nation wide draft for the men to go to war; this led women to be the heads of the households. This meant that this required women to work in blue collar fields or fields that men would dominate primarily in the United States. This was to ensure the country had enough production to keep supplying the military with the right resources for the war. In the 1950s, many households ended up having mothers that worked a full time job. This is simply due to the fact that many Americans wanted to certain lifestyle especially after going through so much hardship over generations. This led to many middle class families having mothers who worked rather than staying at home. This was becoming more socially accepted because many of the families felt that they wanted extra income.

Globally, women who work the same jobs as men are given less compensation. Women made up approximately 40.2% of the global workforce in 2025. In 1990, they only made up a third of the working force in their respected nations. In the United States, women accounted for 47.1% of employed people aged 16 and older in 2025, based on an unadjusted 11-month average that excluded October because data were not collected during the federal government shutdown. Women have made enormous strides in their job opportunities, but they make two thirds of what a man makes at the same job.

In terms of inequality there can be many factors that contribute to this issues which are mostly issues cause by those in power. In 2020 the world wide COVID-19 Pandemic affected everyone on some level of criteria. Post 1990s women had some of the largest percentage of employment in the Modern era. When COVID-19 hit in 2020, women had the sharpest decline in employment in decades. The fact is that women are the primarily care-givers and many had the responsibility of taking care of their family at home.

While it is common knowledge that women are not treated fairly across most societies, it is important to take a deep look at legality across the world. There have been studies done that show that only 4% of woman across the world have full equality in terms of legality. This exposes the harsh reality woman face everyday. Many of these countries treat woman as second class citizens. Many countries will claim woman have full equity in all aspects of their lives, but in practice this is not the case. As of 2025 there have been over 100 legals reforms in trying to enable woman more economic opportunities.

As more women find their respective paths within the work force it is important to be aware of the barrier towards high level job opportunities such as being in a position of authority at a company. When analyzing the statistics, it can be seen that a large majority of woman are in position that require "soft skills". These positions consist of Human Resources personnel, clergies, and secretaries. This perpetuates the notion that woman are still having a lack of access to certain high level job opportunities.

=== Effects on the middle and upper classes ===
The addition of women into the workforce was one of the key factors that has increased social mobility over the last 50 years, although this has stalled in recent decades for both genders. Female children of the middle and upper classes had increased access to higher education, and thanks to job equality, were able to attain higher-paying and higher-prestige jobs than ever before. Due to the dramatic increase in availability of birth control, these high status women were able to delay marriage and child-bearing until they had completed their education and advanced their careers to their desired positions. In 2001, the survey on sexual harassment at workplace conducted by women's nonprofit organisation Sakshi among 2,410 respondents in government and non-government sectors, in five states recorded 53 percent saying that both sexes don't get equal opportunities, 50 percent of women are treated unfairly by employers and co-workers, 59 per cent have heard sexist remarks or jokes, and 32 percent have been exposed to pornography or literature degrading women.

In comparison with other sectors, IT organisations may be offering equal salaries to women, and the density of women in technology companies may be relatively high, but this does not necessarily ensure a level playing field. For example, Microsoft (US) was sued because of the conduct of one of its supervisors over e-mail. The supervisor allegedly made sexually offensive comments via e-mail, such as referring to himself as "president of the amateur gynecology club". He also allegedly referred to the plaintiff as the "Spandex Queen". E-harassment is not the sole form of harassment. In 1999, Juno Online faced two separate suits from former employees who alleged that they were told that they would be fired if they broke off their ongoing relationships with senior executives. Pseudo Programs, a Manhattan-based Internet TV network, was sued in January 2000 after male employees referred to female employees as "bimbos" and forced them to look at sexually explicit material on the Internet. In India, HR managers admit that women are discriminated against for senior Board positions and pregnant women are rarely given jobs but only in private. In addition to this, it has been suggested that there are fewer women in the IT sector due to existing stereotypes that depict the sector as male-orientated. In a recent book, Own It: Leadership Lessons From Women Who Do, author Aparna Jain interviewed 200 women in senior management and leadership positions in India about the problems they face at the workplace and noted that 86% of the women she spoke to experienced harassment in one form or the other. Among the issues she notes are bias, bullying, sexual harassment and the impact of motherhood on women's career. Recently a sexual harassment suit against a senior member shocked the Indian IT sector, as was the sexual harassment case against the Taj Hotels Resorts and Palaces' (Taj Group) CEO, Rakesh Sarna . A startling example of institutional mechanisms that allow for an unfettered environment for sexual harassment to fester is the Rajendra K. Pachauri scandal at The Energy and Resources Institute in India. Improvements in the education system could be the key to encouraging women to take up roles in this sector.

Recognizing the invisible nature of power structures that marginalize women at the workplace, the Supreme Court in the landmark case Vaishaka versus High Court of Rajasthan (1997) identified sexual harassment as violative of the women's right to equality in the workplace and enlarged the ambit of its definition. The judgment equates a hostile work environment on the same plane as a direct request for sexual favors. To quote: "Sexual harassment includes such unwelcome sexually determined behaviour (whether directly or by implication) as: physical contact and advances; a demand or request for sexual favours; sexually coloured remarks; showing pornography; any other unwelcome physical, verbal or non-verbal conduct of sexual nature". The judgement mandates appropriate work conditions should be provided for work, leisure, health, and hygiene to further ensure that there is no hostile environment towards women at the workplace and no woman employee should have reasonable grounds to believe that she is disadvantaged in connection with her employment.

This law thus squarely shifts the onus onto the employer to ensure employee safety but most mid-sized Indian service technology companies are yet to enact sexual harassment policies. Admits K Chandan, an advocate from Chandan Associates, "I have a few IT clients. When I point to the need for a sexual harassment policy, most tend to overlook or ignore it. It's not high on the agenda." An HR Manager of India's premier technology companies rues: "I am going to use the recent case to push the policy through. Earlier the draft proposal was rejected by the company." Yet another HR manager from a flagship company of India's leading business house, oblivious to the irony of her statement, admitted that the company had a grievance redressal mechanism but no sexual harassment policy in place. The lax attitudes transgress the Supreme Court judgment wherein the Court not only defined sexual harassment, but also laid down a code of conduct for workplaces to prevent and punish it, "Employers or other responsible authorities in public or private sectors must comply with the following guidelines: Express prohibition of sexual harassment should be notified and circulated; private employers should include prohibition of sexual harassment in the standing orders under the Industrial Employment (Standing Orders) Act, 1946." As for the complaint procedure, not less than half of its members should be women. The complaint committee should include an NGO or other organization that is familiar with the issue of sexual harassment. When the offense amounts to misconduct under service rules, appropriate disciplinary action should be initiated. When such conduct amounts to an offense under the Indian Penal Code, the employer shall initiate action by making a complaint with the appropriate authority. However, the survey by Sakshi revealed 58 per cent of women were not aware of the Supreme Court guidelines on the subject. A random survey by AssureConsulting.com among hundred employees working in the IT industry revealed startling results: Less than 10 per cent were familiar with the law or the company's sexual harassment policy. Surprisingly, certain HR managers were also ignorant of the Supreme Court guidelines or the Draft Bill by the National Commission of Women against sexual harassment at the workplace.

Not surprisingly many cases go unreported. However, given the complexities involved, company policy is the first step and cannot wish away the problem. Says Savita HR Manager at Icelerate Technologies, "We have a sexual harassment policy that is circulated among employees. Also the company will not tolerate any case that comes to its notice. But the man at home is no different from the person at the office", thus implying the social mindset that discriminates against women is responsible for the problem. Considering sexual censorship and conservative social attitudes emphasizing "woman's purity", the victim dare not draw attention for fear of being branded a woman with "loose morals". Women would rather brush away the problem or leave jobs quietly rather than speak up, even in organizations that have a zero tolerance policy. Says Chandan, "I do not have exact statistics but from my experience as an advocate one in 1,500 cases are reported." The problem cannot be resolved till more women speak up but the social set-up browbeats women into silence. The social stigma against the victim and the prolonged litigation process for justice thwarts most women from raising their voice. Purports K Chandan "It may take between three and five years to settle a case, and in a situation where the harassment is covert, evidence is hard to gather and there is no guarantee that the ruling would be in favour of the victim. In one of the rare cases I handled a Country Manager was accused and the plaintiff opted for an out of court settlement."

=== Effects on the working class ===
Women in lower wage jobs are more likely to be subject to wage discrimination. They are more likely to bring home far less than their male counterparts with equal job status, and get far less help with housework from their husbands than the high-earning women. Women with low educational attainment entering the workforce in mass quantity lowered earnings for some men, as the women brought about a lot more job competition. The lowered relative earnings of the men and increase in birth control made marriage prospects harder for lower income women.

For the first time in the history of this country, there were distinctive socioeconomic stratification among women as there has been among men for centuries. This deepened the inequality between the upper/middle and lower/working classes. Prior to the feminist movement, the socioeconomic status of a family was based almost solely on the husband/father's occupation. Women who were now attaining high status jobs were attractive partners to men with high status jobs, so the high earners married the high earners and the low earners married the low earners. In other words, the rich got richer and the poor stayed the same, and have had increased difficulty competing in the economy.

== Impact issues of female participation in the workforce ==
A 2008 study published in the British Medical Journal found that women were 46% more likely to call in sick for short time periods than men and a third more likely than men to take short term sick leave. At 60 days or more, men and women were equal in terms of sick leave.

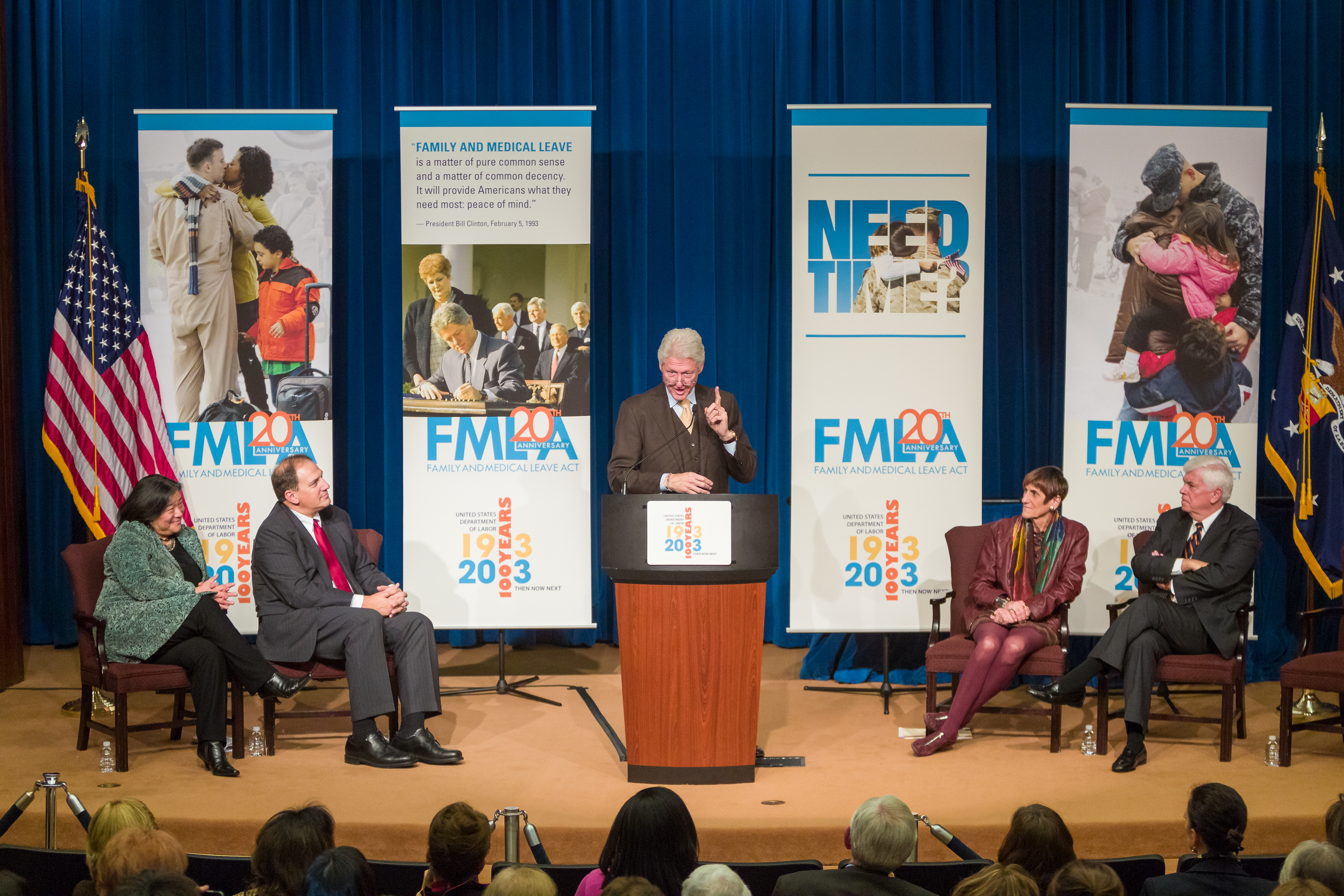
U.S. Department of Labor celebration of the 20th anniversary of the Family and Medical Leave Act of 1993

The number of women in the workforce has tripled and due to this increase, it has become difficult for both mothers and fathers to be able to take care of their own new born child or a sick family member. The Family and Medical Leave Act of 1993 has allowed for workers to have up to 12 weeks a year to leave work.

=== Female labor and contraceptive pills ===
Women have for a long time been unable to actively participate in the labor force. One main reason is due to pregnancy. With the advancement of the contraceptive pill in the US and nonstop women activists like Katharine McCormick, women gained access to the pill in the 1960s, and with time wild access has been made available for women in many parts of the world. This might seem like women were the most affected by this change. However, the pill also changed the game for men. In his article about the pill, Rob Norton mentioned the impact it had on couples as a whole. We have two effects related to the universality of the pill. The Direct effect is how it affected the educational and career path of most women. For instance, women were able to postpone when they wanted to have kids and focus on their education and career advancement. We also have the indirect effect which shows how it impacted both men and women as to when they wanted to get married or start a family. Both partners now had the ability to focus on theirs careers and personal advancement without being worried of not finding any eligible bachelor later on.

==== Lack of work-family policies in US workplaces ====
Compared to other Western countries, the female labor participation rate in the US has been largely stagnant since the early 2000s, due in part to the lack of work-family policies. For example, the US does not have any paid maternity leave mandates while other countries have made significant progress in this area. Women in the US are more likely to access higher positions in companies than in those other countries because they spend less time on maternity leave, which offers them a competitive advantage. However, the lack of advancement in family-friendly policies greatly harms both parents' mental health and sometimes that of the child(ren), which explains the decrease in female labor participation. Men can also be harmed by lack of family-friendly policies.

In 1990, US women had one of the highest labor force participation rates among Western, economically advanced nations. Changes in work-family policies appear to be a major contributor in these participation rates failing to increase with other Western, economically advanced nations. In 1990, women's labor force participation in the US was 74% compared to the non-US average of 67.1%, ranking the US 6th out of 22. In 2010, women's participation increased slightly to 75.2% in the US, while the non-US average jumped more than 12 percentage points to 79.5%. As a result, US women ranked 17th out of 22 countries only 20 years later. While the US did enact a mandate of up to 12 weeks of unpaid leaves due to the passage of the Family and Medical Leave Act (FMLA) of 1993, parental leave mandates may encourage women to remain out of the labor force longer than before. As a result, such mandates could raise the expected cost of employing women in their childbearing years, potentially lowering their wages and deterring employers from hiring them. Despite intentions of increasing women's labor force participation rates, such mandates created more ambiguous effects on these rates, despite seeing a positive effect from these types of mandates in other countries.

=== Fertility ===
Increased participation of women in the workforce is associated with decreased fertility. A cross-country panel study found this fertility factor effect to be strongest among women aged 20–39, but with a less strong but persistent effect among older women as well. International United Nations data suggests that women who work because of economic necessity have higher fertility than those who work because they want to do so.

The impact of women's employment is more negatively associated with the birth of a second child, as opposed to the first.

However, for countries in the OECD area, increased female labor participation has been associated with an increased fertility.

Causality analyses indicate that fertility rate influences female labor participation and not as much the other way around.

Regarding types of jobs, women who work in nurturing professions such as teaching and health generally have children at an earlier age. Since the 2010s, European demographists have theorized that women often self-select themselves into jobs with a favorable work–family balance in order to combine motherhood and employment.

== History ==
=== Early history ===
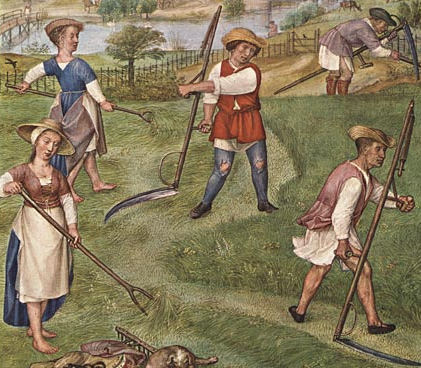
Women working in the field, from the Grimani Breviary, c. 1510

Women have worked at agricultural tasks since ancient times, and continue to do so around the world.

The idea that women historically stayed home while men worked is a modern myth and a "traditional" ideal (often linked to the 1950s) rather than a long-standing reality. Throughout history, women have consistently worked in agriculture, manufacturing, and family businesses, often working 12–15 hours a day.

=== 18th century ===
Russian noblewoman Yekaterina Vorontsova-Dashkova was the first woman in the world to head a national academy of sciences, the first woman in Europe to hold a government office and the president of the Russian Academy.

=== 19th century ===
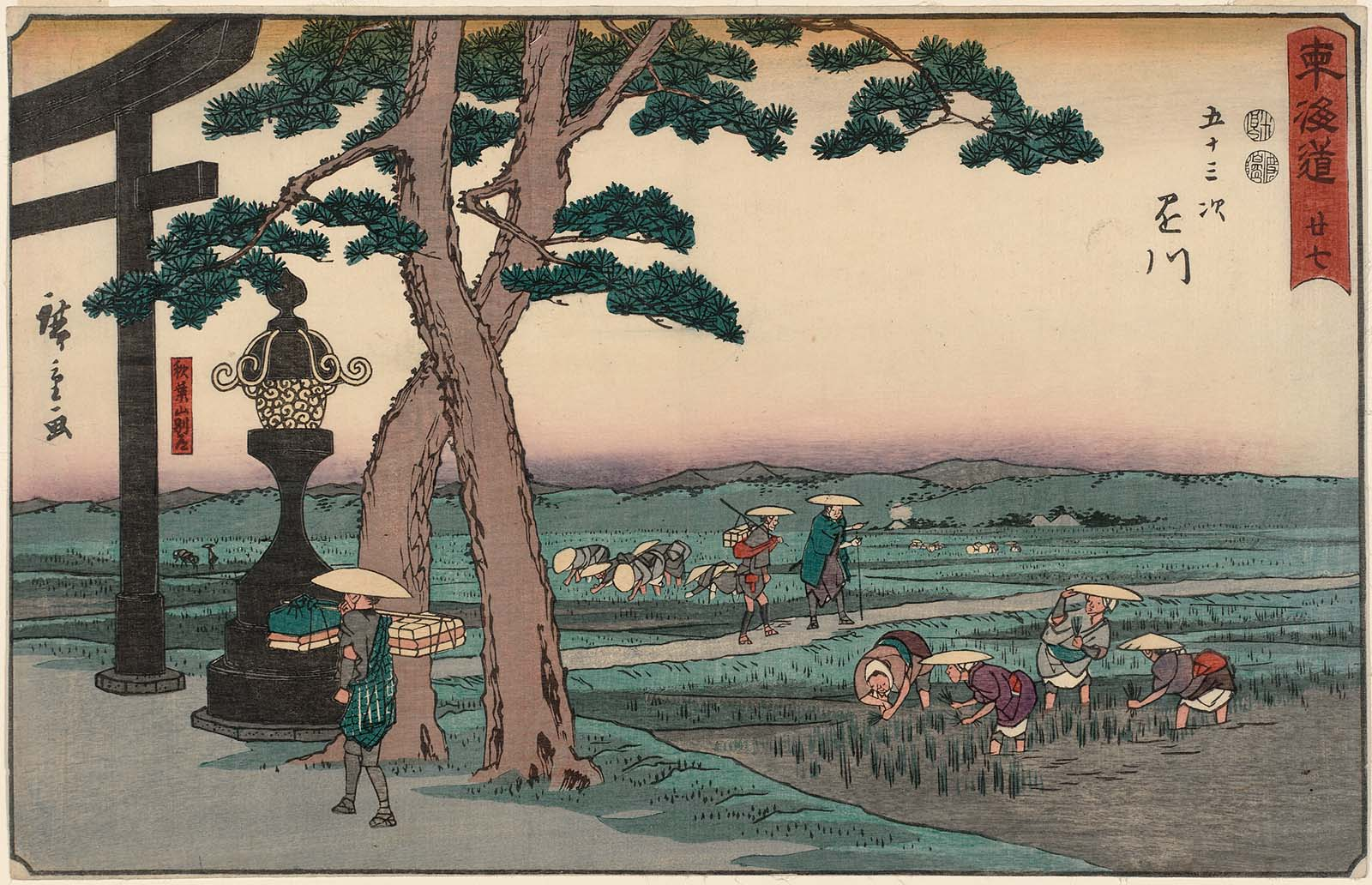
Japanese peasant women planting rice, Hiroshige, circa 1847

The Industrial Revolution of the late 18th and early 19th centuries changed the nature of work in Europe and other countries of the Western world. Working for a wage, and eventually a salary, became part of urban life. Initially, women were to be found doing even the hardest physical labor, including working as "hurriers" hauling heavy coal carts through mine shafts in Great Britain, a job that also employed many children. This ended after government intervention and the passing of the Mines and Collieries Act 1842, an early attempt at regulating the workplace.

During the 19th century, an increasing number of women in Western countries took jobs in factories, such as textile mills, or on assembly lines for machinery or other goods. Women also worked as "hawkers" of produce, flowers, and other market goods, and bred small animals in the working-class areas of London. Piecework, which involved needlework (weaving, embroidery, winding wool or silk) that paid by the piece completed, was the most common employment for women in 19th century Great Britain. It was poorly paid, and involved long hours, up to 14 hours per day to earn enough wages to survive. Working-class women were usually involved in some form of paid employment, as it provided some insurance against the possibility that their husband might become too ill or injured to support the family. During the era before workers' compensation for disability or illness, the loss of a husband's wages could result in the entire family being sent to a Victorian workhouse to pay debts.

Inequality in wages was to be expected for women. In 1906, the government found that the average weekly factory wage for a woman ranged from 11s 3d to 18s 8d, whereas a man's average weekly wage was around 25s 9d. Employers stated they preferred to hire women, because they could be "more easily induced to undergo severe bodily fatigue than men". Childminding was another necessary expense for many women working in factories. Pregnant women worked up until the day they gave birth and returned to work as soon as they were physically able. In 1891, a law was passed requiring women to take four weeks away from factory work after giving birth, but many women could not afford this unpaid leave, and the law was unenforceable.

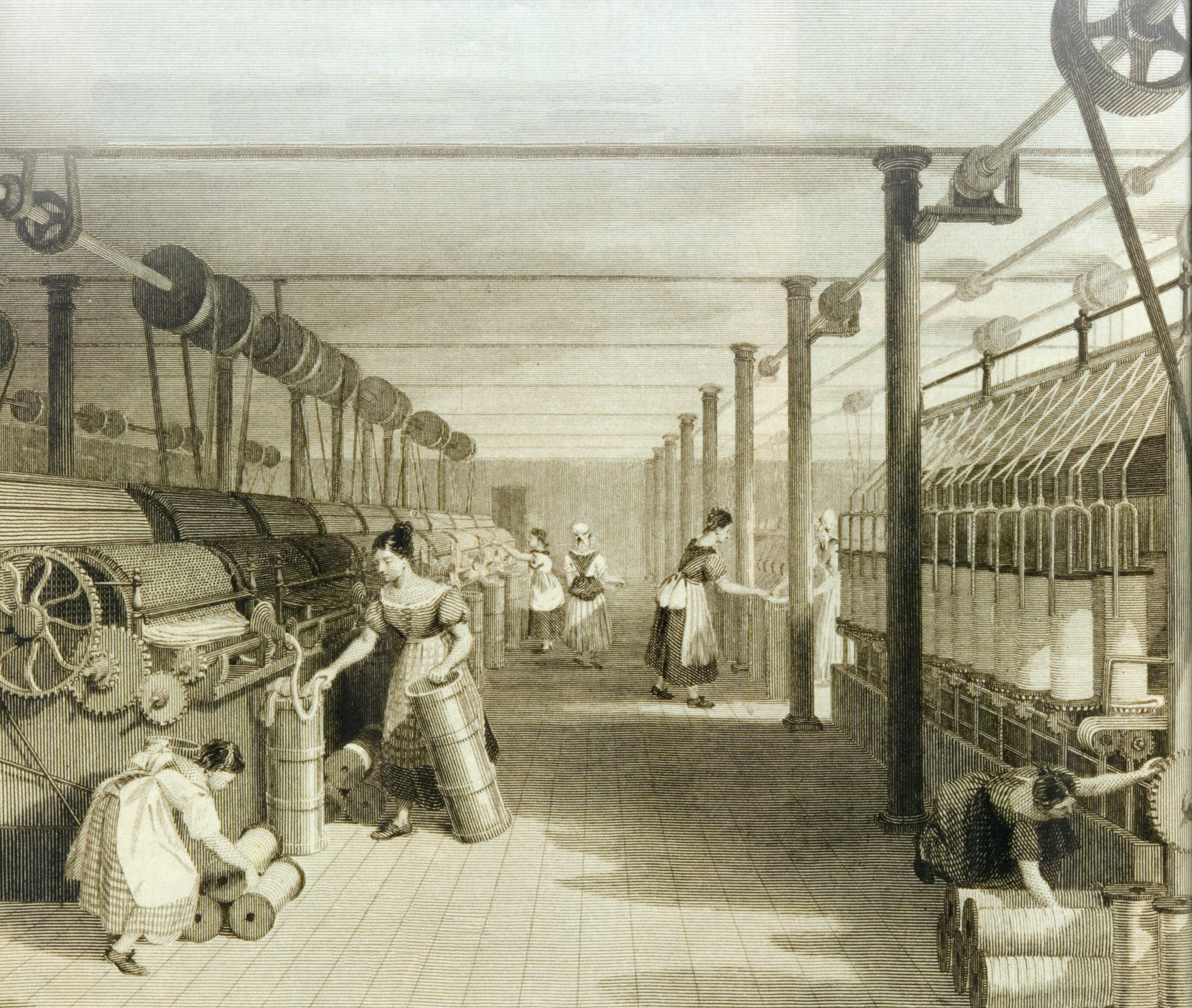
Women and children working in a Manchester cotton mill, c. 1834

The 1870 US census was the first United States census to count "females engaged in each occupation" and provides an intriguing snapshot of women's history. It reveals that, contrary to popular belief, not all American women of the 19th century were either idle in their middle-class homes or working in sweatshops. Women were 15% of the total work force (1.8 million out of 12.5). They made up one-third of factory "operatives", but teaching and the occupations of dressmaking, millinery, and tailoring played a larger role. Two-thirds of teachers were women. Women could also be found in such unexpected places as iron and steel works (495), mines (46), sawmills (35), oil wells and refineries (40), gas works (4), and charcoal kilns (5) and held such surprising jobs as ship rigger (16), teamster (196), turpentine laborer (185), brass founder/worker (102), shingle and lathe maker (84), stock-herder (45), gun and locksmith (33), and hunter and trapper (2). Formal classification may grossly under-estimate female labor force participation via self-employment or family employment with studies suggesting participation may have always been high.

Some women began entering the workforce in the 19th century through textile factories, the industrial and garment assembly jobs done during this time "[provided a] point for participation by rural women in the formal economy". Several of the tasks performed by women in the textile factories were decided due to cultural attitudes of women's capabilities. Sex-typing, is the stereotypical categorization of people according to traditional notions of gender roles and expectations. This segregation of tasks was demonstrated in textile factories, "women [were] considered to possess sex-specific skills that determine their abilities; they are apparently dexterous, decorative, and meticulous". Women were assumed to have physical skills that made them naturally suitable to complete certain tasks, "employers hired women as mill operatives, they said, because their small, graceful fingers could piece the threads together easily". In addition to physical differences, women were assumed to have a specific emotional temperament that made them innate for working in textile mills, "the female temperament-passive, patient and careful was thought to be perfectly suited to boring, repetitive work".

=== 20th century ===
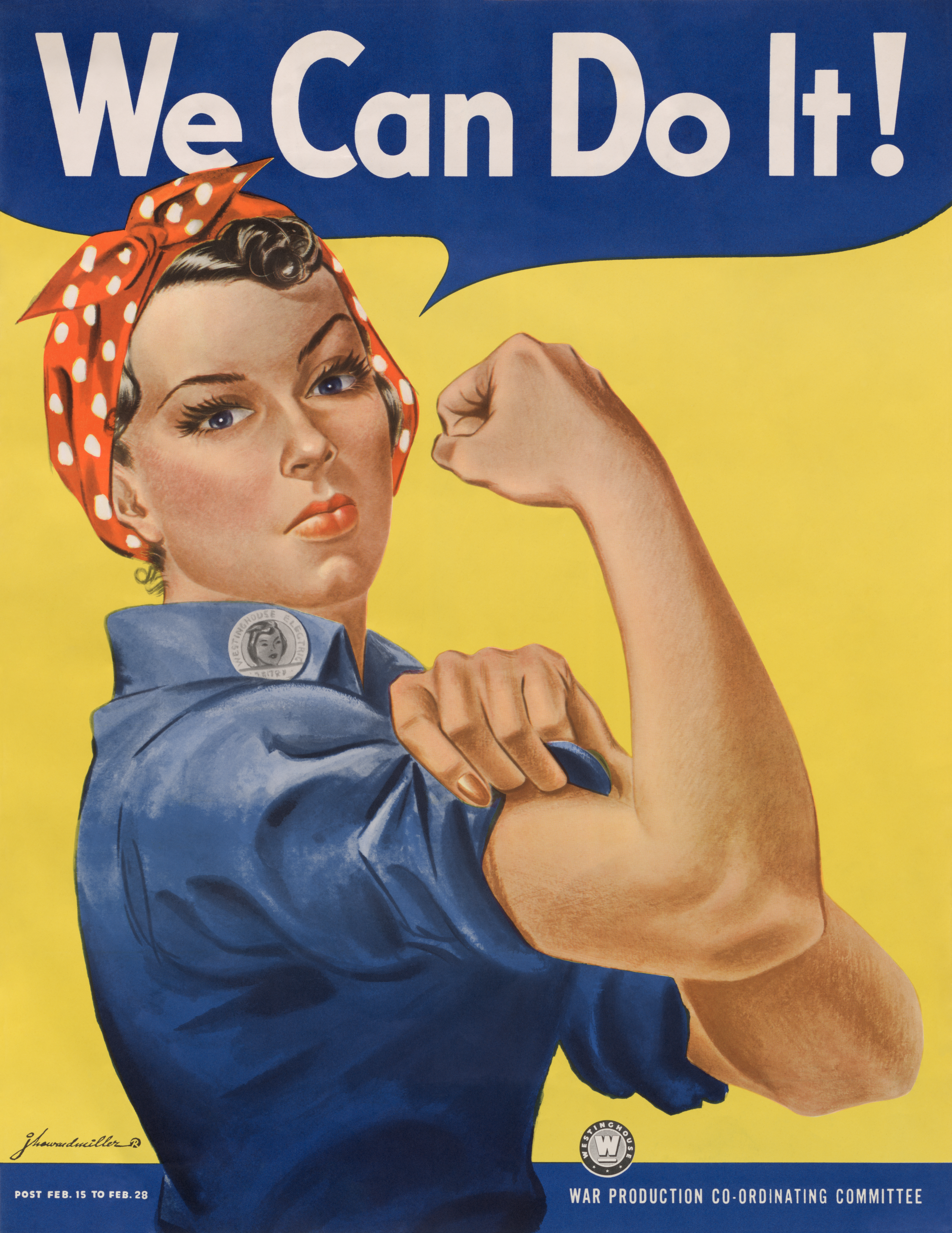
Rosie the Riveter is an iconic propaganda image of the US government's efforts to exhort women to work during World War II. It has been adapted numerous times to represent working women or, more broadly, women overcoming adversity and other proto-feminist messages.

In the beginning of the 20th century, women were regarded as society's guardians of morality; they were seen as possessing a finer nature than men and were expected to act as such. Their role was not defined as workers or money makers. Women were expected to hold on to their innocence until the right man came along so that they can start a family and inculcate that morality they were in charge of preserving. The role of men was to support the family financially. Yet at the turn of the 20th century, social attitudes towards educating young women were changing. Women in North America and Western Europe were now becoming more and more educated, in no small part because of the efforts of pioneering women to further their own education, defying opposition by male educators. By 1900, four out of five colleges accepted women and a whole coed concept was becoming more and more accepted.

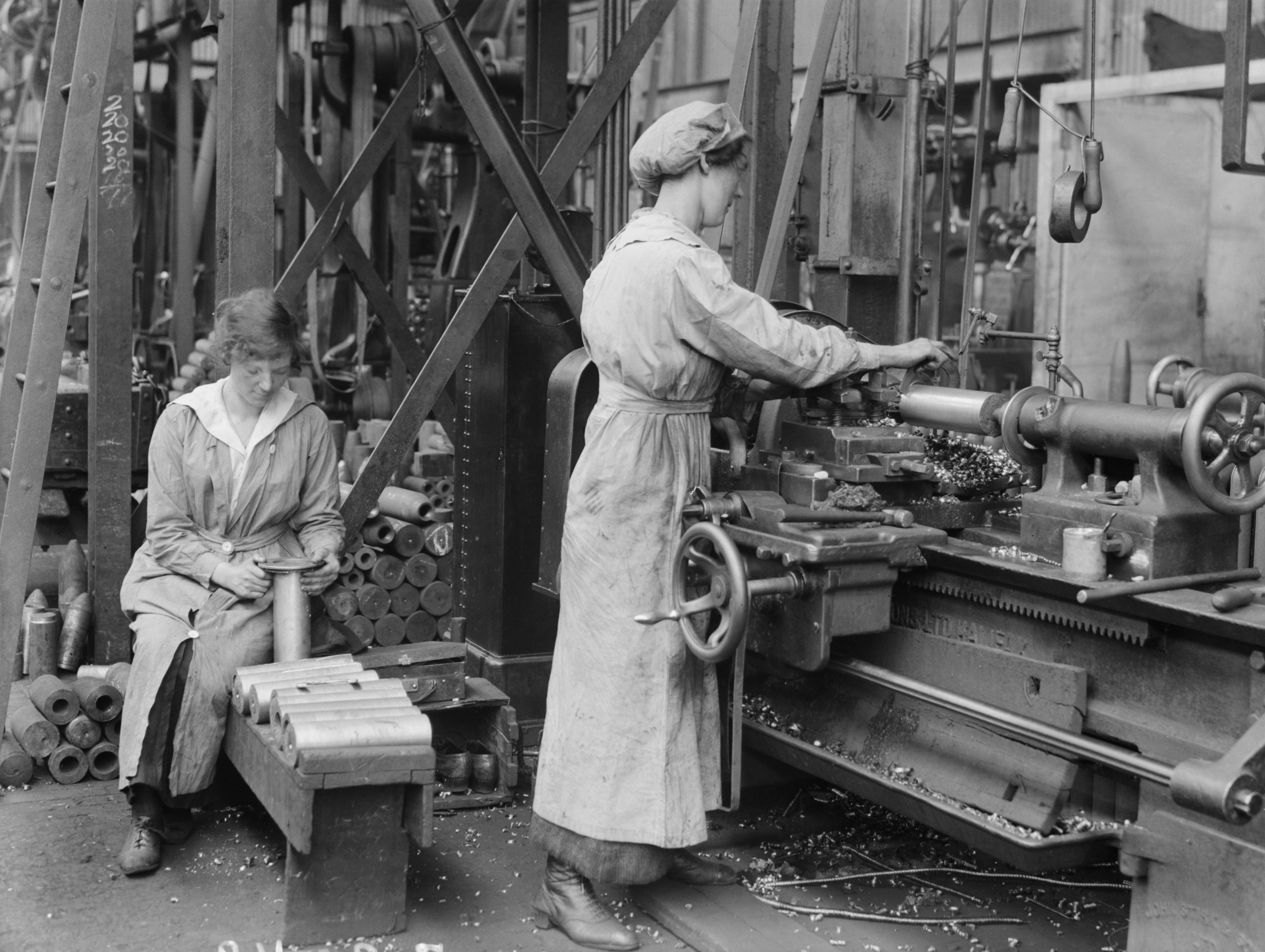
Operating a turning machine in Royal Shell Factory 3 in the Royal Arsenal, Woolwich, London, in May 1918.

In the United States, World War I made space for women in the workforce, among other economical and social influences. Due to the rise in demand for production from Europe during the raging war, more women found themselves working outside of the home.

In the first quarter of the century, women mostly occupied jobs in factory work or as domestic servants, but as the war came to an end they were able to move on to such jobs as: salespeople in department stores as well as clerical, secretarial and other, what were called, "lace-collar" jobs. In July 1920, The New York Times ran a head line that read: "the American Woman ... has lifted her skirts far beyond any modest limitation" which could apply to more than just fashion; women were now rolling up their sleeves and skirts and making their way into the workforce.

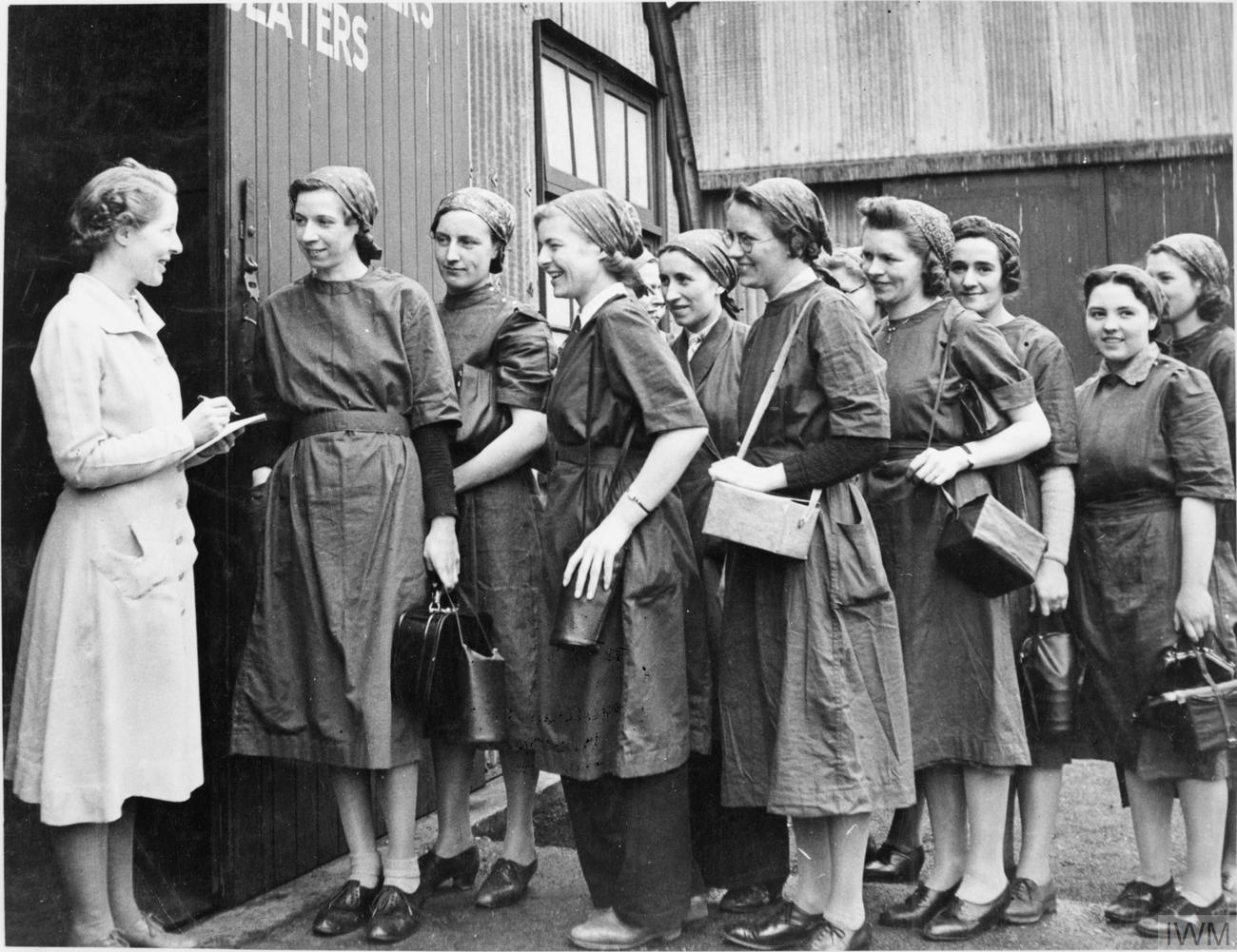
Female factory workers in the United Kingdom during World War II, 1941

World War II created millions of jobs for women. Thousands of American women actually joined the military: 140,000 in the Women's Army Corps (United States Army) WAC; 100,000 in the Navy (WAVE); 23,000 in the Marines; 14,000 in the Navy Nurse Corps and, 13,000 in the Coast Guard. Although almost none saw combat, they replaced men in noncombat positions and got the same pay as the men would have on the same job. At the same time over 16 million men left their jobs to join the war in Europe and elsewhere, opening even more opportunities and places for women to take over in the job force. Although two million women lost their jobs after the war ended, female participation in the workforce was still higher than it had ever been. In post-war America, women were expected to return to private life as homemakers and child-rearers. Newspapers and magazines directed at women encouraged them to keep a tidy home while their husbands were away at work. These articles presented the home as a woman's proper domain, which she was expected to run. Nevertheless, jobs were still available to women. However, they were mostly what are known as "pink-collar" jobs such as retail clerks and secretaries. The propaganda to encourage women to return to the home is depicted in the film The Life and Times of Rosie the Riveter.

=== The Quiet Revolution ===
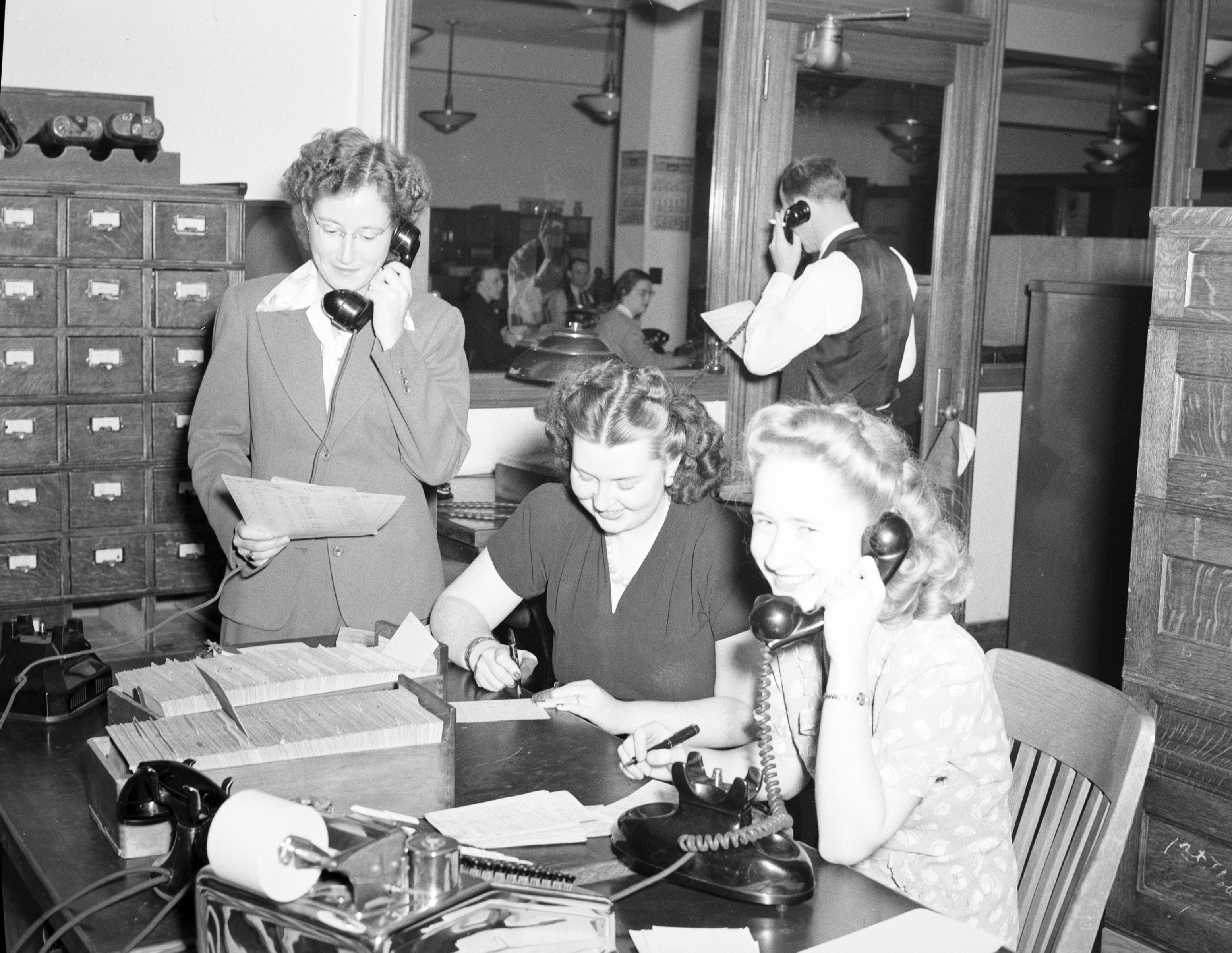
Customer account operators working for a photography firm in Seattle, 1945

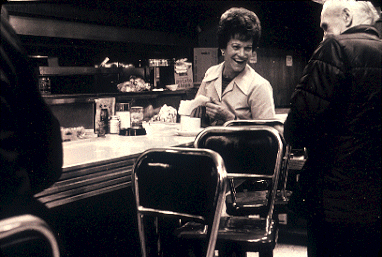
A diner waitress at Pike Place Market in Seattle, United States, 1981

The increase of women in the labor force of Western countries gained momentum in the late 19th century. At this point women married early on and were defined by their marriages. If they entered the workforce, it was only out of necessity.

The first phase of this "revolution" encompasses the time between the late 19th century to the 1930s. This era gave birth to the "independent female worker." From 1890 to 1930, women in the workforce were typically young and unmarried. They had little or no learning on the job and typically held clerical and teaching positions. Many women also worked in textile manufacturing or as domestics. Women promptly exited the work force when they were married, unless the family needed two incomes.

The second phase began towards the end of the 1920s, when married women begin to exit the work force less and less. Labor force productivity for married women 35–44 years of age increase by 15.5 percentage points from 10% to 25%. There was a greater demand for clerical positions and as the number of women graduating high school increased they began to hold more "respectable", steady jobs. This phase has been labeled as the "Transition Era," referring to the time period between 1930 and 1950. During this time the discriminatory institution of marriage bars, which forced women out of the work force after marriage, were eliminated, allowing more participation in the work force of single and married women. Additionally, women's labor force participation increased because there was an increase in demand for office workers, and women participated in the high school movement. However, women's work was still contingent upon their husband's income. Women did not normally work to fulfill a personal need to define their career and social worth; they worked out of necessity.

In the third phase, labeled the "Roots of the Revolution" - encompassing the time from 1950 to the mid-to-late 1970s - the movement began to approach the warning signs of a revolution. Women's expectations of future employment changed. Women began to see themselves going on to college and working during their marriages and even attending graduate school. However, many still had brief and intermittent work force participation, without necessarily having expectations for a "career." To illustrate, most women were secondary earners, and worked in "pink-collar jobs" as secretaries, teachers, nurses, and librarians. The sexual harassment experienced by these pink collar workers is depicted in the film 9 to 5. Although more women attended college, it was often expected that they attended to find a spouse—the so-called "M.R.S. degree". Nevertheless, labor force participation by women still grew significantly.

The fourth phase, known as the "Quiet Revolution", began in the late 1970s and continues today. Beginning in the 1970s women began to flood colleges and graduate schools. They began to enter professions like medicine, law, dental and business. More women were going to college and expected to be employed at the age of 35, as opposed to past generations that only worked intermittently due to marriage and childbirth. They were able to define themselves prior to a serious relationship. Research indicates that from 1965 to 2002, the increase in women's labor force participation more than offset the decline for men.

The reasons for this big jump in the 1970s has been attributed by some scholars to widespread access to the birth control pill. (Note: While "the pill" was medically available in the 1960s, numerous laws restricted access to it.) By the 1970s, the age of majority had been lowered from 21 to 18 in the United States, largely as a consequence of the Vietnam War; this also affected women's right to effect their own medical decisions. Since it had now become socially acceptable to postpone pregnancy even while married, women had the luxury of thinking about other things, like education and work. Also, due to electrification, women's work around the house became easier leaving them with more time to be able to dedicate to school or work. Due to the multiplier effect, even if some women were not blessed with access to the pill or electrification, many followed by the example of the other women entering the work force for those reasons. The Quiet Revolution is called such because it was not a "big bang" revolution; rather, it happened and is continuing to happen gradually. Research by economist Claudia Goldin also was able to state how women’s college majors changed as they began preparing for longer careers. In 1966, approximately 40 percent of female college graduates majored in education, while only 2 percent majored in business and management. By 1998, the percentage of women majoring in education had fallen to 12 percent. Business became an increasingly popular field, with 22 percent of female undergraduates majoring in business by 1988. These changes reflected a shift in women’s educational choices as more women expected to remain working long term into the future. Goldin’s research also found that differences between men’s and women’s college majors decreased by half between 1966 and 1998. The shift was a more broader transformation in women’s career planning and access to professional opportunities. The shift was able to demonstrate how changing employment expectations connected to women’s educational decisions and their preparation for long-term participation in the workforce.

=== 21st century ===
By the early 21st century, women were more likely than men to experience job burnout. In addition, the COVID-19 pandemic that began in early 2020 had a major impact on the work environment. The hardest-hit industries were those employing many women, who not only had to work from home but also had to deal with additional caregiving responsibilities due to school closures and other disruptions. The Great Resignation of 2021 was the result of many factors, including wage stagnation amid rising cost of living, limited opportunities for career advancement, hostile work environments, lack of benefits, inflexible remote-work policies, and long-lasting job dissatisfaction.

As difficult as it was for many women (as well as men), the changes in the work environment due to the pandemic may have lasting benefits: more flexibility in work locations and hours, changes in company culture to adapt to women's needs, more movement of women into positions of leadership, and more sharing of household responsibilities with spouses and other partners.

== Occupational safety and health ==
Women tend to have different occupational hazards and health issues than men in the workplace. Women get carpal tunnel syndrome, tendonitis, anxiety disorders, stress, respiratory diseases, and infectious diseases due to their work at higher rates than men. The reasons for these differences may be differences in biology or in the work that women are performing. Women's higher rates of job-related stress may be due to the fact that women are often caregivers at home and do contingent work and contract work at a much higher rate than men. Another significant occupational hazard for women is homicide, which was the second most frequent cause of death on the job for women in 2011, making up 26% of workplace deaths in women. Immigrant women are at higher risk for occupational injury than native-born women in the United States, due to higher rates of employment in dangerous industries.

Women are at lower risk for work-related death than men. However, personal protective equipment is usually designed for typical male proportions, which can create hazards for women who have ill-fitting equipment. Women are less likely to report an occupational injury than men.

Time poverty heightens the risk for depression, inflated BMI, and cardiovascular disease in women.

Research is ongoing into occupational hazards that may be specific to women. Of particular interest are potential environmental causes of breast cancer and cervical cancer. Sexual harassment is an occupational hazard for many women, and can cause serious negative symptoms including anxiety, depression, nausea, headache, insomnia, and feelings of low self-esteem and alienation. Women are also at higher risk for occupational stress, which can be caused by balancing roles as a parent or caregiver with work.

== See also ==
- Claudia Goldin — 2023 Nobel prize winner for "advanc[ing] our understanding of women's labor market outcomes"
- Girl power
- Feminisation of the workplace
- Employment discrimination
- Occupational sexism
- Motherhood penalty
- Women's empowerment
- National Federation of Women Workers, a former trade union in the United Kingdom

=== Women's participation in different occupations ===
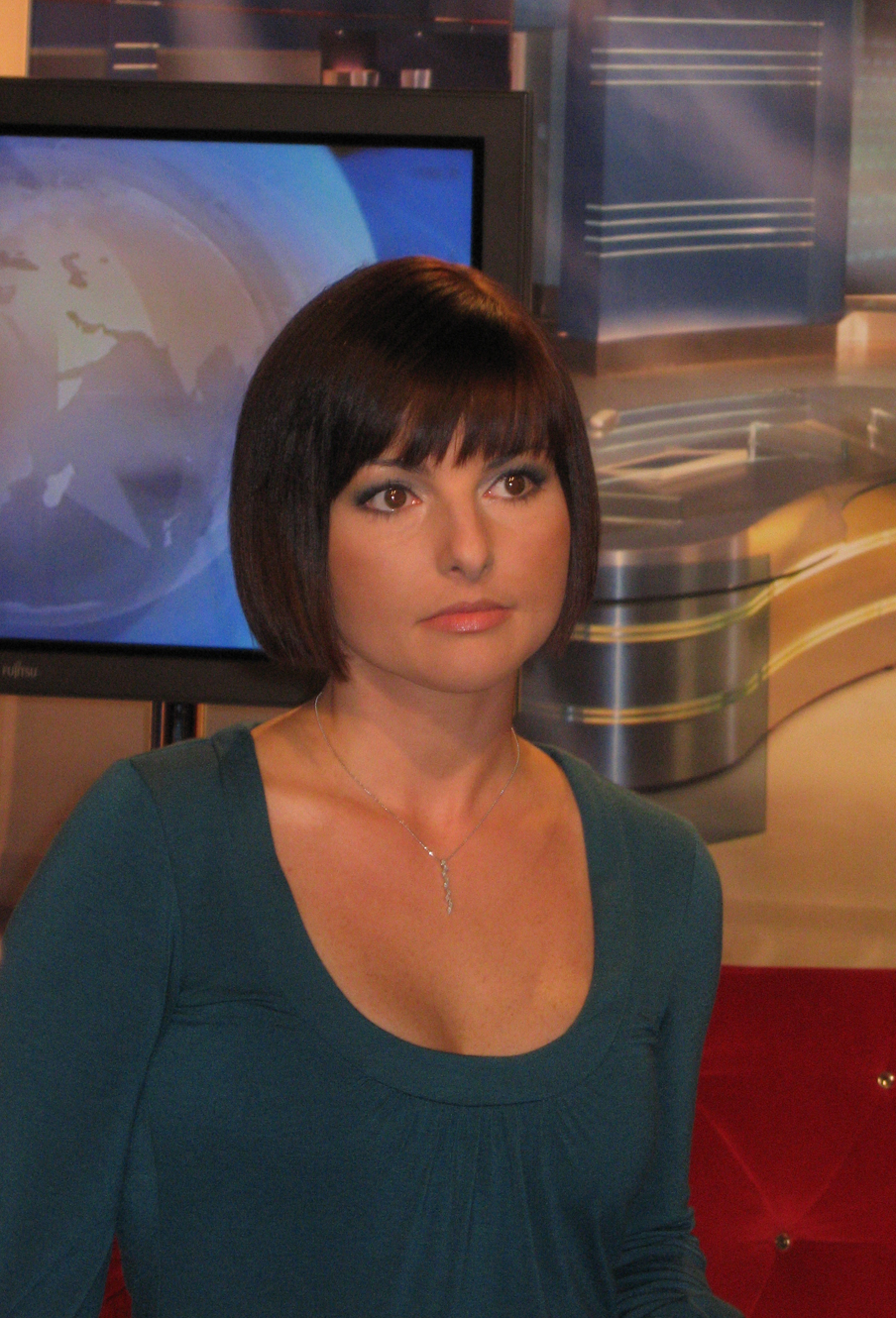
A news anchor going live on TV in Poland

Below is a selection of encyclopedia articles that detail women's historical involvement in various occupations.

- Women in Brewing
- Women in science
  - Women in computing
  - Women in engineering
  - Women in geology
- Women in medicine
- Arts, writing, media, sports and entertainment
  - Women artists (visual arts)
  - Writing
    - Women's writing (literary category)
    - Women in journalism
  - Film
    - Women's cinema (discusses women screenwriters and directors)
  - Sports
    - Women's professional sports
- Women in government
- Women in the military

== Sources ==
This article incorporates text from a free content work. Licensed under CC BY-SA 3.0 (license statement/permission). Text taken from Seizing the opportunities of the African Continental Free Trade Area for the economic empowerment of women in agriculture, FAO, FAO.

== Bibliography ==
History of women in the workforce

- A Woman's Wage: Historical Meanings and Social Consequences – Alice Kessler-Harris (updated edition, 2014)
- Challenging Professions: Historical and Contemporary Perspectives on Women's Professional Work – Elizabeth Smyth, Sandra Acker, Paula Bourne & Alison Prentice (1999)
- English Women Enter the Professions – Nellie Alden Franz (1965)
- Black Women and White Women in the Professions: Occupational Segregation by Race and Gender, 1960–1980 – N. Sokoloff (1992)
- Unequal Colleagues: The Entrance of Women into the Professions, 1890–1940 – Penina Migdal Glazer & Miriam Slater (1987)
- Beyond Her Sphere: Women and the Professions in American History – Barbara J. Harris (1978)
- "Challenging Professions: Historical and Contemporary Perspectives on Women's Professional Work" (Book Review) – Pamela Sugiman, in Relations Industrielles/Industrial Relations
- Victorian Working Women: A Historical and Literary Study of Women in British Industries and Professions 1832–1850 – Wanda F. Neff
- Colonial Women of Affairs: A Study of Women in Business and the Professions in America Before 1776 – Elisabeth Anthony Dexter
- What a Woman Ought to Be and to Do: Black Professional Women Workers During the Jim Crow Era – Stephanie J. Shaw
- In Subordination: Professional Women, 1870–1970 – Mary Kinnear (1995)
- Women Working in Nontraditional Fields: References and Resources 1963–1988 – Carroll Wetzel Wilkinson
- Kinnear, Karen L. (2011). Women in Developing Countries: A Reference Handbook. ABC-Clio. ISBN 978-1-59884-425-2.

Social sciences and psychological perspectives;

- Averett, Susan L.; Argys, Laura M.; Hoffman, Saul D., eds. (2017). The Oxford Handbook of Women and the Economy. New York: Oxford University Press. doi:10.1093/oxfordhb/9780190628963.001.0001. ISBN 978-0-19-062898-7.
- Suhail Ahmad, Women in profession: A comparative study of Hindu and Muslim women
- Ella L. J. Edmondson Bell and Stella M. Nkomo, Our Separate Ways: Black and White Women and the Struggle for Professional Identity
- Julia Evetts, Women and Career: Themes and Issues in Advanced Industrial Societies (Longman Sociology Series)
- Patricia N. Feulner, Women in the Professions: A Social-Psychological Study
- Linda S. Fidell and John D. DeLamater, Women in the Professions
- Clara Greed, Surveying Sisters: Women in a Traditional Male Profession
- Jerry Jacobs, Professional Women at Work: Interactions, Tacit Understandings, and the Non-Trivial Nature of Trivia in Bureaucratic Settings
- Edith J. Morley, Women Workers in Seven Professions
- Xiomara Santamarina, Belabored Professions: Narratives of African American Working Womanhood
- Janet Skarbek, Planning Your Future: A Guide for Professional Women
- Elizabeth Smyth, Sandra Acker, Paula Bourne, and Alison Prentice, Challenging Professions: Historical and Contemporary Perspectives on Women's Professional Work
- Nancy C. Talley-Ross, Jagged Edges: Black Professional Women in White Male Worlds (Studies in African and African-American Culture, Vol 7) (1995)
- Joyce Tang and Earl Smith, Women and Minorities in American Professions (S U N Y Series on the New Inequalities)
- Anne Witz (1990). "Patriarchy and Professions: The Gendered Politics of Occupational Closure". Sociology. 24 (4): 675–690. doi:10.1177/0038038590024004007. S2CID 143826607.
- Anne Witz, Professions and Patriarchy (International Library of Sociology) (1992)

Work and family demands/support for women

- Terri Apter, Working Women Don't Have Wives: Professional Success in the 1990s
- Sian Griffiths, Beyond the Glass Ceiling: Forty Women Whose Ideas Shape the Modern World (Women's Studies)
- Linda Hantrais, Managing Professional and Family Life: A Comparative Study of British and French Women
- Deborah J. Swiss and Judith P. Walker, Women and the Work/Family Dilemma: How Today's Professional Women Are Finding Solutions
- Alice M. Yohalem, The Careers of Professional Women: Commitment and Conflict

Workplace discrimination based on gender

- The Commission on Women in the Profession, Sex-Based Harassment, 2nd Edition: Workplace Policies for the Legal Profession
- Sylvia Ann Hewlett, Off-ramps and On-ramps: Keeping Talented Women on the Road to Success
- Karen Maschke, The Employment Context (Gender and American Law: The Impact of the Law on the Lives of Women)
- Evelyn Murphy and E. J. Graff, Getting Even: Why Women Don't Get Paid Like Men—And What to Do About It (2006)
- KOLHATKAR, SHEELAH, "THE DISRUPTERS" New Yorker, 0028792X, November 20, 2017, Vol. 93, Issue 37

Mentoring and "old-boys/old-girls networks"

- Nancy W. Collins, Professional Women and Their Mentors: A Practical Guide to Mentoring for the Woman Who Wants to Get Ahead
- Carolyn S. Duff, Learning From Other Women: How to Benefit From the Knowledge, Wisdom, and Experience of Female Mentors
- Joan Jeruchim, Women, Mentors, and Success
- Peggy A. Pritchard, Success Strategies for Women in Science: A Portable Mentor (Continuing Professional Development Series)

Arts and literature studies on women in the workforce

- Carmen Rose Marshall, Black Professional Women in Recent American Fiction

=== Professional areas ===
Teaching, librarianship, and university professions

- Maenette K. P. Benham and Joanne Cooper, Let My Spirit Soar!: Narratives of Diverse Women in School Leadership (1-Off)
- Roger Blanpain and Ann Numhauser-Henning, Women in Academia and Equality Law: Aiming High, Falling Short? Denmark, France, Germany, Hungary, Italy, the Netherlands, Sweden, United Kingdom (Bulletin of Comparative Labour Relations)
- S. A. L. Cavanagh, The Gender of Professionalism and Occupational Closure: the management of tenure-related disputes by the 'Federation of Women Teachers' Associations of Ontario' 1918–1949, Gender and Education, 15.1, March 2003, pp. 39–57. See Routledge.
- Regina Cortina and Sonsoles San Roman, Women and Teaching: Global Perspectives on the Feminization of a Profession
- Nancy Hoffman, Woman's "True" Profession, 2nd ed. (1982, 2nd ed.) ("classic history of women and the teaching profession in the United States")
- Julia Kwong, Ma Wanhua, and Wanhua Ma, Chinese Women and the Teaching Profession

Social sciences

- Kathleen Bowman and Larry Soule, New Women in Social Sciences (1980)
- Lynn McDonald, The Women Founders of the Social Sciences (1994)

Social sciences – anthropology

- Barbara A. Babcock and Nancy J. Parezo, Daughters of the Desert: Women Anthropologists and the Native American Southwest, 1880–1980 (1988)
- Ruth Behar and Deborah A. Gordon, Women Writing Culture (1996)
- Maria G. Cattell and Marjorie M. Schweitzer, Women in Anthropology: Autobiographical Narratives and Social History (2006)
- Ute D. Gacs, Aisha Khan, Jerrie McIntyre, and Ruth Weinberg, Women Anthropologists: Selected Biographies (1989);Women Anthropologists: A Biographical Dictionary (1988)
- Nancy Parezo, Hidden Scholars: Women Anthropologists and the Native American (1993)

Social sciences – archaeology

- Cheryl Claassen, Women in Archaeology (1994)
- Margarita Diaz-Andreu and Marie Louise Stig Sorensen, Excavating Women: A History of Women in European Archaeology (1998;2007)
- Getzel M. Cohen and Martha Sharp Joukowsky, editors, Breaking Ground: Pioneering Women Archaeologists (2004)
- Nancy Marie White, Lynne P. Sullivan, and Rochelle A. Marrinan, Grit-Tempered: Early Women Archaeologists in Southeastern United States (2001)

Social sciences – history

- Eileen Boris and Nupur Chaudhuri, Voices of Women Historians: The Personal, the Political, the Professional (1999)
- Jennifer Scanlon and Shaaron Cosner, American Women Historians, 1700s–1990s: A Biographical Dictionary (1996)
- Nadia Smith, A "Manly Study"?: Irish Women Historians, 1868–1949 (2007)
- Deborah Gray White, Telling Histories: Black Women Historians in the Ivory Tower (forthcoming 2008)
- Southern Association for Women Historians

Social sciences – linguistics

- Davison, The Cornell Lectures: Women in the Linguistics Profession

"STEM" fields (science, technology, engineering, and maths)

- Violet B. Haas and Carolyn C. Perrucci, Women in Scientific and Engineering Professions (Women and Culture Series)
- Patricia Clark Kenschaft, Change Is Possible: Stories of Women and Minorities in Mathematics
- Jacquelyn A. Mattfeld and Carol E. Van Aken, Women and the Scientific Professions: The MIT Symposium on American Women in Science and Engineering (1964 symposium;1976 publication)
- Karen Mahony & Brett Van Toen, Mathematical Formalism as a Means of Occupational Closure in Computing—Why "Hard" Computing Tends to Exclude Women, Gender and Education, 2.3, 1990, pp. 319–31. See ERIC record.
- Peggy A. Pritchard, Success Strategies for Women in Science: A Portable Mentor (Continuing Professional Development Series)
- Margaret W. Rossiter, Women Scientists in America: Struggles and Strategies to 1940 (Women Scientists in America)
- Otha Richard Sullivan and Jim Haskins, Black Stars: African American Women Scientists and Inventors

Legal professions

- Joan Brockman and Dorothy E. Chunn, "'A new order of things': women's entry into the legal profession in British Columbia", The Advocate
- The Commission on Women in the Profession, Visible Invisibility: Women of Color in Law Firms
- The Commission on Women in the Profession, Sex-Based Harassment, 2nd Edition: Workplace Policies for the Legal Profession
- Hedda Garza, Barred from the Bar: A History of Women in the Legal Profession (Women Then—Women Now)
- Jean Mckenzie Leiper, Bar Codes: Women in the Legal Profession
- Sheila McIntyre and Elizabeth Sheehy, Calling for Change: Women, Law, and the Legal Profession
- Mary Jane Mossman, The First Women Lawyers: A Comparative Study of Gender, Law And the Legal Professions
- Rebecca Mae Salokar and Mary L. Volcansek, Women in Law: A Bio-Bibliographical Sourcebook
- Ulrike Schultz and Gisela Shaw, Women in the World's Legal Professions (Onati International Series in Law and Society)
- Lisa Sherman, Jill Schecter, and Deborah Turchiano, Sisters-In-Law: an Uncensored Guide for Women Practicing Law in the real world

Religious professions

- Stanley J. Grenz and Denise Muir Kjesbo, Women in the Church: A Biblical Theology of Women in Ministry
- Lenore Friedman, Meetings with Remarkable Women: Buddhist Teachers in America

Helping professions (social work, childcare, eldercare, etc.)

- Ski Hunter, Sandra Stone Sundel, and Martin Sundel, Women at Midlife: Life Experiences and Implications for the Helping Professions
- Linda Reeser, Linda Cherrey, and Irwin Epstein, Professionalization and Activism in Social Work (1990) (covers gender as part of history of professionalization), Columbia University Press, ISBN 0-231-06788-7
- Sarah Stage and Virginia B. Vincenti, editors, Rethinking Home Economics: Women and the History of a Profession

Architecture and design

- Designing for Diversity: Gender, Race, and Ethnicity in the Architectural Profession by Kathryn H. Anthony
- The First American Women Architects by Sarah Allaback (forthcoming 2008)

Arts and literature

- Margaret Barlow, Women Artists
- Whitney Chadwick, Women Artists and the Surrealist Movement
- Liz Rideal, Whitney Chadwick, and Frances Borzello, Mirror Mirror: Self-Portraits by Women Artists
- Jo Franceschina, Women and the Profession of Theater, 1810–1860
- National Geographic Society, Women Photographers at National Geographic
- Laura R. Prieto, At Home in the Studio: The Professionalization of Women Artists in America

Entertainment and modeling

- Ann Cvetkovich, "Fierce Pussies and Lesbian Avengers: Dyke Activism Meets Celebrity Culture" (images of female models merging infiltrating other cultures)
- Michael Gross, Model: The Ugly Business of Beautiful Women (2003) (history of female modeling);
- Ian Halperin, Shut Up and Smile: Supermodels, the Dark Side (1999)
- Nancy Hellmich, "Do thin models warp girls' body image?", USA Today, September 26, 2006
- Jennifer Melocco, "Ban on Stick-Thin Models Illegal", Daily Telegraph, February 16, 2007
- Barbara Summers, Black and Beautiful: How Women of Color Changed the Fashion Industry (racism within modeling)
- Barbara Summers, Skin Deep: Inside the World of Black Fashion Models (1999)
- Naomi Wolf, The Beauty Myth: How Images of Beauty Are Used Against Women (1991)

Explorers, navigators, travelers, settlers

- Joanna Stratton, Pioneer Women
- David Cordingly, Seafaring Women: Adventures of Pirate Queens, Female Stowaways, and Sailors' Wives

Sports and athletics

- Karra Porter, Mad Seasons: The Story of the First Women's Professional Basketball League, 1978–1981

Business and leadership

- Roger E. Axtell, Tami Briggs, Margaret Corcoran, and Mary Beth Lamb, Do's and Taboos Around the World for Women in Business
- Douglas Branson, No Seat at the Table: How Corporate Governance and Law Keep Women Out of the Boardroom
- Lin Coughlin, Ellen Wingard, and Keith Hollihan, Enlightened Power: How Women are Transforming the Practice of Leadership
- Harvard Business School Press, editors, Harvard Business Review on Women in Business
- S. N. Kim, "Racialized gendering of the accountancy profession: toward an understanding of Chinese women's experiences in accountancy in New Zealand" in Critical Perspectives on Accounting
- Deborah Rhode, The Difference ""Difference"" Makes: Women and Leadership (2002)
- Judy B. Rosener, America's Competitive Secret: Women Managers
- Robert E. Seiler, Women in the Accounting Profession (1986)

European Union initiatives and information

- Report "Women and men in decision-making 2007 – analysis of the situation and trends"
- Database on women in decision-making
- Commission's Roadmap for Equality between women and men (2006–2010)
