= Dobbins =

Dobbins is an English surname.

Dobbins may refer to:

== People ==
=== Military ===
- Archibald S. Dobbins (c. 1827 – c. 1878), American soldier of the Confederate Army
- Daniel Dobbins (1776–1856), US Navy sailor

=== Politics ===
- Donald C. Dobbins (1878–1943), American lawyer and politician in Illinois
- Horace Dobbins (1868–1962), American businessman and politician, onetime mayor of Pasadena, California
- Samuel A. Dobbins (1814–1886), American politician in New Jersey

=== Sports ===
- Bob Taylor Dobbins (1890–1945), American college football player and coach
- Ethan Dobbins, Australian rugby player
- Hunter Dobbins (born 1999), American baseball player
- Ian Dobbins (born 1983), Scottish footballer
- J. K. Dobbins (born 1998), American football player
- Ollie Dobbins (born 1941), American football player
- Rob Dobbins (born 1940), Australian international lawn bowler and coach
- Tim Dobbins (born 1982), American football player
- Tony Dobbins (born 1981), American-Italian basketball coach and player

=== Other areas ===
- Bennie Dobbins (1932–1988), American stuntman and actor
- Bill Dobbins (born 1943), American photographer
- Debbie Dobbins (1963–1993), Philippine-born fitness model killed in a New York City fire
- James Dobbins (diplomat) (1942–2023), American diplomat
- James C. Dobbins (born 1949), American professor and Japanologist
- Karinda Dobbins, American comedian
- Peggy Dobbins (born 1938), American sociologist and activist
- Rosemary A. Dobbins (1927–2006), American artist and photographer
- Tabbetha Dobbins, American physicist and educator

=== Fictional characters ===
- Eugene Dobbins, fictional character in the American television series Oz

== Places ==
Each in the United States

- Dobbins, California, a census-designated place
- Dobbins, Kentucky, an unincorporated community
- Dobbins Creek, a neighborhood community in Phoenix, Arizona
- Dobbins Heights, North Carolina, a town

== Other uses ==
Each in the United States

- Dobbins Air Reserve Base, Georgia, originally known as Dobbins Air Force Base
- Dobbins Creek (disambiguation), several places
- Dobbins Landing, a tourist area in Erie, Pennsylvania
- Dobbins Stadium, a ballpark in Davis, California
- Dover Dobbins, a former minor-league baseball team based in Dover, Delaware

== See also ==
- Dobbin (disambiguation)
