= James Dobbins =

James Dobbins may refer to:

- James Dobbins (diplomat) (1942–2023), American foreign policy official
- James C. Dobbins (born 1949), American academic and Japanologist

== See also ==
- James Dobbin (disambiguation)
- Dobbins (disambiguation)
