= Sky Arts =

British arts-oriented television channel

- Logo used since 2026

Programming
- Picture format: 1080i HDTV (downscaled to 16:9 576i for the SDTV feed)

Ownership
- Owner: Sky Group (Comcast)
- Sister channels: List of Sky UK channels

History
- Launched: 1 January 2000; 26 years ago
- Closed: 9 June 2015; 11 years ago (Sky Arts 2)
- Former names: Artsworld (2000–2007), Sky Arts (2000-2007, 2015-present); Sky Arts 1 (2007-2015)

Links
- Website: www.sky.com/watch/channel/sky-arts

Availability

Terrestrial
- Freeview: Channel 36 (SD)

Streaming media
- Sky Go: Watch live (UK and Ireland only)
- Now: Watch live (UK and Ireland only)
- Virgin TV Go: Watch live (UK only)
- Virgin TV Anywhere: Watch live (Ireland only)

Sky Arts (originally launched as Artsworld) is a British free-to-air television channel offering 24 hours a day of programmes dedicated to highbrow arts, including theatrical performances, films, documentaries and music (such as opera performances and classical and jazz sessions). The channel is available in the United Kingdom through Freeview, Freesat, BT TV, Sky, Virgin Media, and TalkTalk TV and in the Republic of Ireland via Sky Ireland, Virgin Media Ireland, Vodafone Ireland and Eir, included in most basic subscription packs, but started life as a premium service requiring an additional payment on top of the monthly Sky subscription. The channel launched on Freeview and Freesat as a free-to-air service in September 2020.

== History ==
=== Artsworld (2000–07) ===
In its early days, it was owned and managed by a public partnership (Artsworld Channels) including Sir Jeremy Isaacs. However, the channel suffered severe financial difficulty. In July 2002, it even staged its own farewell party, only to find emergency funding that very evening. In 2003, with a skeleton staff, it was facing closure. At this point, Sky stepped in, taking an initial 50% stake.

Sky subsequently bought out the remaining shareholders (including Isaacs) and in June 2005 took full control, reducing the staff further, and dropping the channel's premium subscription fee shortly afterwards. 60 hours of classic music along with seven full-length operas were broadcast each month to help bring in potential new subscribers. John Cassy, the channel manager of Artsworld, said: "It is great news for the arts that a dedicated cultural channel will be available to millions of households."

=== Sky Arts (2007–present) ===
On 1 March 2007, Artsworld became Sky Arts and Artsworld HD became Sky Arts HD. This resulted in all of BSkyB's wholly owned channels carrying the Sky name (until Pick TV was launched and Virgin Media Television – which included Challenge – was acquired).

From 8 June 2007, Sky Arts introduced a series called Friday Night Hijack. Artists were invited to schedule a night of television that reflects their tastes, interests and passions. Guests included legendary punk DJ Don Letts, Don McCullin, Saffron Burrows, Anthony Horowitz, Malcolm McLaren, Phill Jupitus, Germaine Greer, George Melly and Reggie Perrin writer David Nobbs.

Picks included a Franz Ferdinand documentary entitled Rock it to Rio, a concert performance by Damon Albarn's new band The Good, the Bad & the Queen as well as documentaries and films on Salvador Dalí, Andy Warhol, Rachel Whiteread and Elvis Costello. This weekly feature was later moved and renamed Sunday Night Hijack.

In 2013, Sky Arts launched Portrait Artist of the Year, a painting competition series presented by Frank Skinner and Joan Bakewell. The series is judged by art experts Tai-Shan Schierenberg, Kathleen Soriano and Kate Bryan. Nick Lord won the first series and was awarded a commission to paint Hilary Mantel for the British Library. In 2014 the second series was won by Christian Hook and his portrait of Alan Cumming is now part of the Scottish National Portrait Gallery collection. In 2015 Sky Arts introduced a development of the competition for landscape painters called Landscape Artist of the Year in association with National Trust. The first series was won by Nerine McIntyre and she was awarded a commission to paint the scene made famous by John Constable at Flatford.

On 9 June 2015, Sky Arts 2 closed and merged its content with Sky Arts 1 to form one channel.

=== The free-to-air era ===
On 17 September 2020, Sky Arts launched on Freeview and Freesat as a free service.

Since becoming a free-to-air service, the channel has picked up a number of acclaimed music documentaries such as King Rocker - A Film About Robert Lloyd and the Nightingales, Poly Styrene: I Am a Cliché and Blitzed: The 80s Blitz Kids' Story, many of which were broadcast on Sky Arts a short while after premiering to the press.

As of 2024, series on Sky Arts include Classic Albums, The Great Songwriters and Guy Garvey: From the Vaults, with the channel also having picked up repeats of Alfred Hitchcock Presents, Tales of the Unexpected and The Joy of Painting with Bob Ross. for its daily schedule. In addition, episodes of the Grand Ole Opry, the long-running American country music programme, and albums documentary series Record On have turned up in the schedules on an ad hoc basis, with the Record On episode concerning The Specials, A Message to You, being scheduled as a one-off programme in a night of music shows, alongside documentaries about The Clash and X-Ray Spex.

== Channels ==
=== Sky Arts ===
Sky Arts (formerly known as Artsworld and Sky Arts 1) focused on the more modern and independent side of Sky Arts' programming. Schedules included cutting-edge documentaries, cult films, and rock concerts. but since 9 June 2015 it has also featured the high brow programmes from the former Sky Arts 2.

=== Sky Arts 2 ===
Sky Arts +1 began broadcasting on 18 August 2008, filling the Performance Channel's EPG slot (purchased by Sky) until the full launch of Sky Arts 2 on 20 October 2008. This channel focused on high brow programme and featured classical music, opera, dance, fine arts programming and reruns of Tales of the Unexpected.

From 30 March to 14 April 2013, Sky Arts 2 was temporarily rebranded as Sky Arts Rieu in honour of André Rieu, broadcasting back-to-back concerts by the violinist.

On 9 June 2015, at 06:00 BST, Sky Arts 2 closed after showing its final classical music programme followed by promos for the new merged channel.

=== Sky Arts HD ===
Artsworld HD was one of the launch channels on Sky HD in 2006. It was a high-definition simulcast of Artsworld, and later Sky Arts, showing HD programmes when available, and upscaling standard-definition programmes.

Following the launch of Sky Arts 2, Sky Arts HD showed a mix of programmes in high definition from both channels – generally Sky Arts 1 all day on Mondays, Thursdays and Sundays and Sky Arts 2 until 7 pm on Tuesdays, Wednesdays, Fridays and Saturdays, switching to Sky Arts 1 from 7 pm onwards on those days.

On 2 March 2009, Sky Arts HD was split into two channels. Sky Arts 1 HD then broadcast from 7 pm to 2 am daily, and Sky Arts 2 HD from 8 am to 7 pm. The standard definition channels continued to broadcast a full schedule from 8 am to 2 am. Sky Arts 1 HD also broadcast a further hour of HD-only programming called 'Aquariavision' intended to be recorded by Sky+ HD owners.

As of June 2009, both Sky Arts 1 and 2 HD broadcast full-time between 6 am and 2 am.

From 1 March 2010, all Sky Arts channels are broadcasting 24 hours a day.

An on and off-air brand refresh for all four channels (Sky Arts 1, Sky Arts 1 HD (a simulcast), Sky Arts 2 and Sky Arts 2 HD (a simulcast)) was launched on 16 August 2010.

On 9 June 2015, at 6 am, Sky Arts 2 HD closed down.

As of September 2020, Sky Arts is currently made up of the following channels: Sky Arts and Sky Arts HD (a simulcast).

=== Sky Arts Ireland ===
On 8 April 2021, Sky began broadcasting a version Sky Arts with adverts tailored to Ireland. The channel is registered with the broadcasting regulator in Luxembourg with the Autorité Luxembourgeoise Indépendante de l'Audiovisuel (ALIA) (Independent Luxembourg Audiovisual Authority) making use of the classification system set by Ireland's BAI Code of Program Standards.

Sky Arts Ireland would later be closed down on 30 October 2025, with Irish viewers now receiving the UK version as before.

== Logo history ==
Sky Arts (from 7 April 2020 to 24 February 2026)

Sky Arts HD (from 7 April 2020 to 24 February 2026)
