= Artist of the Year =

British TV series

- Also known as: Portrait Artist of the Year; Landscape Artist of the Year
- Presented by: Joan Bakewell (2013–2023); Frank Skinner (2013–2018); Stephen Mangan (2018–present)
- Judges: Kate Bryan; Kathleen Soriano; Tai-Shan Schierenberg; Eva Langret
- Country of origin: United Kingdom
- Original language: English
- No. of series: 15
- No. of episodes: 141

Production
- Production locations: Various (auditions); National Portrait Gallery (finals)
- Running time: 60 minutes (inc. adverts)
- Production company: Storyvault Films

Original release
- Network: Sky Arts
- Release: 5 November 2013 – present

Artist of the Year is a television competition shown on the Sky Arts channel (formerly known as Artsworld and Sky Arts 1) which aims to find the best portrait and landscape artist every year.

== Overview ==
Through several rounds of regional competitions in different parts of the UK professional and amateur artists are challenged to produce a landscape; whilst the portrait competition takes place in London where the contestants produce a picture of one of three famous sitters. The winning artist of each round, selected by three judges, advances to the semi-final and then to the final. The landscape competition is filmed on location; whilst the portrait competition is held at Battersea Arts Centre. The winner of both series receives a £10,000 commission to paint either a famous landmark or a famous personality and the picture becomes part of a national collection.

The show is produced by London and Glasgow-based independent production company Storyvault Films, and is currently presented by Stephen Mangan, who joined for the sixth series replacing Frank Skinner; until 2023 Skinner and then Mangan co-hosted the show with Joan Bakewell (with the exception of Portrait Artist programmes produced during the COVID-19 pandemic, which Mangan hosted alone due to social distancing precautions); Bakewell presented her final series of the show on Portrait Artist 2023 (Series 18 of the competition), in which she also appeared as a sitter in one of the episodes.

Until 2026 the regular judges were the British art historian, curator and arts broadcaster Kate Bryan, head of contemporary art at the Fine Art Society, Kathleen Soriano, director of exhibitions at the Royal Academy, and portrait/landscape painter Tai-Shan Schierenberg. In 2026 a new judging panel was announced, with Eva Langret, director of Frieze London, replacing Bryan from Landscape Artist 2026 onwards, and Schierenberg and Soriano replaced on Portrait Artist by artist Jonathan Yeo and curator and historian Katy Hessel from 2026 onwards; a refreshed format for Landscape Artist from the 2027 series will be judged by Langret and Schierenberg, with Fearne Cotton hosting alongside Mangan.

== Series ==
| Series | Start date | End date | Episodes | Title | Winner | Commission |
|---|---|---|---|---|---|---|
| 1 | 5 Nov 2013 | 10 Dec 2013 | 6 | Portrait | Nick Lord | Hilary Mantel |
| 2 | 4 Nov 2014 | 23 Dec 2014 | 8 | Portrait | Christian Hook | Alan Cumming |
| 3 | 6 Oct 2015 | 1 Dec 2015 | 9 | Landscape | Nerine McIntyre | Flatford Mill |
| 4 | 11 Oct 2016 | 6 Dec 2016 | 9 | Landscape | Richard Allen | Petworth Park |
| 5 | 24 Jan 2017 | 21 Mar 2017 | 9 | Portrait | Gareth Reid | Graham Norton |
| 6 | 18 Oct 2017 | 10 Dec 2017 | 9 | Landscape | Tom Voyce | Firefly Estate |
| 7 | 16 Jan 2018 | 27 Mar 2018 | 11 | Portrait | Samira Addo | Kim Cattrall |
| 8 | 16 Oct 2018 | 11 Dec 2018 | 9 | Landscape | Jen Gash | Commission for the Imperial War Museum |
| 9 | 12 Feb 2019 | 23 Apr 2019 | 11 | Portrait | Duncan Shoosmith | Tom Jones |
| 10 | 15 Oct 2019 | 10 Dec 2019 | 9 | Landscape | Fujiko Rose | Venice |
| 11 | 21 Jan 2020 | 24 Mar 2020 | 11 | Portrait | Christabel Blackburn | Nile Rodgers |
| 12 | 14 Oct 2020 | 16 Dec 2020 | 11 | Portrait | Curtis Holder | Carlos Acosta |
| 13 | 13 Jan 2021 | 10 Mar 2021 | 9 | Landscape | Ophelia Redpath | Snowdonia National Park |
| 14 | 13 Oct 2021 | 15 Dec 2021 | 12 | Portrait | Calum Stevenson | Nicola Benedetti |
| 15 | 12 Jan 2022 | 9 Mar 2022 | 10 | Landscape | Elisha Enfield | Rochdale Canal |
| 16 | 5 Oct 2022 | 14 Dec 2022 | 12 | Portrait | Morag Caister | Lenny Henry |
| 17 | 11 Jan 2023 | 8 Mar 2023 | 10 | Landscape | Finn Campbell-Notman | Celebrating the Van de Veldes |
| 18 | 4 Oct 2023 | 6 Dec 2023 | 10 | Portrait | Wendy Barratt | Jane Goodall |
| 19 | 10 Jan 2024 | 28 Feb 2024 | 9 | Landscape | Monica Popham | Science Museum |
| 20 | 9 Oct 2024 | 11 Dec 2024 | 10 | Portrait | Brogan Bertie | Lorraine Kelly |
| 21 | 22 Jan 2025 | 12 Mar 2025 | 10 | Landscape | Benjamin MacGregor | South of France |
| 22 | 1 Oct 2025 | 10 Dec 2025 | 10 | Portrait | Chloe Barnes | Hannah Fry |

== International adaptations ==
Landscape Artist of the Year Canada, a Canadian version of the show, premiered in 2020 on Makeful.

Portrettmesterskapet, a Norwegian portrait version of the show, premiered on 14 September 2023 on NRK.

Danmarks bedste portrætmaler is a Danish portrait version of the show, premiered on 1 March 2018 on DR.

Portrait Artist Of The Year, an Australian portrait version of the show produced by EndemolShine Australia, premiered on 2 November 2025 on ABC TV and ABC iview.
