= Kate Bryan =

British art historian, curator and arts broadcaster

Kate Bryan (born 11 March 1982) is a British art historian, curator and arts broadcaster. In 2016, she became head of collections for Soho House globally. She presents the Sky Arts Series Inside Arts which began in 2019. She wrote and presented the art television series Galleries on Demand, which aired every week in 2016 on Sky Arts. She was a judge on the Sky Arts television series Artist of the Year, presented by Stephen Mangan and Joan Bakewell.

Bryan has been a contributor to the arts television programme The Culture Show on BBC Two, Newsnight on BBC Two and in 2013 presented an hour-long special for The Culture Show on The Art of Chinese Painting. In 2016, she was a presenter of the Sky Arts documentary The Mystery of the Lost Caravaggio, which aired in Italy as Operazione Caravaggio. She also contributed to Dante's Inferno, Raphael and Beauty and Artemisia Gentileschi: Painting to Survive on Sky Arts. In 2018, she presented an hour-long live broadcast from Tate Modern on the Picasso 1932 exhibition, also on Sky Arts. In 2019 she presented a follow-up as live programme from Tate Britain, Van Gogh and Britain for Sky Arts.

== Family and education ==
Bryan grew up in Bracknell, Berkshire, and attended a state comprehensive school. Having come from a modest background, she says she hates the elitism which sometimes makes art feel daunting. She earned her BA from Warwick University in 2003 and her MPhil from Hong Kong University in 2010. Her thesis subject was images of the Penitent Magdalene in Italian Renaissance Art. In 2014, she won the Arts and Culture category of the Women of the Future Awards. She is a mentor for young women in the arts.

She is married to James, who works for Citibank; they have a daughter, Juno Bobby Bryan, born on 4 July 2019.

== Career ==
Bryan started her career at the British Museum and in 2006 worked on the Michelangelo Drawings exhibition. She lived in Hong Kong from 2007 to 2011 and was gallery director of The Cat Street Gallery. She was a contributing editor for Asian Art News and contributed art-related articles to the South China Morning Post, Time Out London and The Guardian. She has worked as an expert guide for Art History Abroad and Art History UK.

Bryan has worked in the commercial art world as an art dealer in Hong Kong and London. She was fair director of a global art fair in London, Art15. She was a director of the art dealership Fine Art Society on New Bond Street in London between 2011 and 2015. She directed the Contemporary exhibition programme. Notable exhibitions include What Marcel Duchamp Taught Me in 2014, which marked 100 years since Marcel Duchamp created the readymade; Chris Levine's Light 3.142 in 2013; Rob and Nick Carter's Transforming, including a display for the artistic duo at The Frick Collection in New York City; and an exhibition in 2012 entitled Things I Love at the Fine Art Society in which she invited the British pop artist Peter Blake to select his favourite works from the gallery vaults.

Since 2016, Bryan has curated the global art collection for Soho House, comprising over 5000 artworks on permanent display across eight countries. In April 2016, she curated the Vault 100 art collection for The Ned London. The collection highlighted gender disparity in finance and the art world; Bryan acquired the work of 93 women and seven men, reversing the FTSE 100 CEO gender ratio.

In October 2018, Bryan curated Not 30% at The Other Art Fair London, presenting the work of 30 female artists in a separate space as part protest, part exhibition.

== Writing ==
In September 2021 Bryan published Bright Stars profiling great artists that died too young. In June 2019, Quarto Press published The Art of Love by Bryan, which profiles 35 artist couples over 140 years. She coauthored A Little Book of Portraits, released in conjunction with the Sky Arts series Artist of the Year, and has written essays for several published exhibition catalogues, including those for Belinda Fox and Sir Peter Blake.

== Works ==
- Bryan, Kate. Resistance: Subverting the Camera – Steven Pippin, Rob & Nick Carter, Janet Laurence, Adam Fuss, Idris Khan, Edgar Lissel, Christopher Bucklow, Stephen Sack. London: The Fine Art Society Contemporary, 2012. ISBN 9781907052125
- Schierenberg, Tai S. A Little Book of Portraits: Beyond the Canvas. Quadrille Publishing, 2014. With commentary by judges Tai Shan Schierenberg, Kathleen Soriano and Kate Bryan. ISBN 978-1849495769
