= Dobbin =

Dobbin can refer to:

- Horse, as rural slang

Dobbin may refer to the following people:

- Brian Dobbin (born 1966), a retired Canadian professional ice hockey player
- Craig Dobbin (1935–2006), Canadian businessman
- Uncle Dobbin (1879–1950), nickname of Frederick Dobbin, South African rugby union international
- James C. Dobbin (1814–1857), the United States Secretary of the Navy from 1853 to 1857
- Jim Dobbin (1941–2014), British politician
- Jim Dobbin (footballer) (born 1964), a Scottish former professional football player
- Kate Dobbin (1868–1948), an Irish artist
- Leonard Dobbin (politician) (1775–1844), Irish Liberal politician
- Lewis Dobbin (born 2003), English footballer
- Mary Alice Dwyer-Dobbin, American television producer
- Tony Dobbin (born 1972), a retired Irish National Hunt jockey

Dobbin may also refer to the following places:

- Dobbin, Texas
- Dobbin, West Virginia
- Dobbins, California, formerly Dobbin

Other uses:

- USS Dobbin (AD-3), an American Navy destroyer tender launched 5 May 1921 and decommissioned on 27 September 1946
- USRC James C. Dobbin (1853)
- A pantomime horse on the British television series Rentaghost

== See also ==
- Dobbins (disambiguation)
- Dobb (disambiguation)
