= Frances Borzello =

British art historian and feminist art critic

- Born: England
- Education: University College London
- Known for: Art History, Women's Studies

Frances Borzello is a British art historian and scholar, feminist art critic and author. Her work specializes in the social history of art, including the social position of European woman artists in the context of their society and the study of female self-portraits and female nudes. She authored the book Seeing Ourselves: Women's Self Portraits, which has been in print since 1998 and has 30 editions. Her work is widely recognized as a contribution to the fields of art history and women's studies.

== Biography ==
Borzello earned her PhD from the University College London in 1980. Her dissertation was published in 1981 and was titled, "The relationship of fine art and the poor in late nineteenth century England". Borzello was a member of a women's photography group founded in the 1970s called Second Sight, which included members such as Annette Kuhn, Jill Pack, and Cassandra Wedd.

Borzello's writing, "Preaching to the converted? Feminist art publishing in the 1980s", was included in the 1995 book New Feminist Art Criticism: Critical Strategies.

Her 1998 book, Seeing Ourselves: Women's Self Portraits, discusses women creating their own images and the power of self-portraits as opposed to being portrayed as objects, as well as a historical look at gender, identity, and representation. The book is an in-depth look at history, starting with the self-portraits of Medieval nuns and eventually ending in the 21st century. The book examines themes in self-portraits, including motherhood, female beauty, and musical talents, as seen in early work, and themes of sexuality, pain, race, gender, and disease, as seen in the 20th-century. Artists discussed in the book Seeing Ourselves: Women's Self Portraits include Judith Leyster, Anna Dorothea Therbusch, Marie-Nicole Dumont, Hortense Haudebourt-Lescot, Suzanne Valadon, Gwen John, Paula Modersohn-Becker, Charlotte Berend-Corinth, Frida Kahlo, Wanda Wulz, Charlotte Salomon, Judy Chicago, Jo Spence, Hannah Wilke, Carolee Schneemann, Cindy Sherman, Tracey Emin and more. The 2016 edition of Seeing Ourselves: Women's Self Portraits is fully revised and includes a new afterword by the author about selfies.

The 2010 book, Frida Kahlo: Face to Face was co-authored with American artist Judy Chicago and focuses on Frida Kahlo's career as well as Kahlo's artwork in relation to topics like female self-portraiture and commercialization.

== Bibliography ==
=== Books ===
- Seeing Ourselves: Women's Self-Portraits. Thames & Hudson, 2016. ISBN 0500239460
- The Naked Nude. Thames & Hudson, 2012. ISBN 0500238928
- Frida Kahlo: Face to Face. co-authored with Judy Chicago, Prestel, 2010. ISBN 3791343602
- At Home: The Domestic Interior in Art. Thames & Hudson, 2006. ISBN 0500238316
- Reclining Nude. co-authored with Lidia Guibert Ferrara, Thames & Hudson, 2002. ISBN 0500237972
- Mirror Mirror: Self-Portraits by Women Artists. by Liz Rideal and contributions by Frances Borzello and Whitney Chadwick, Watson-Guptill, 2002. ISBN 0823030717
- A World of Our Own: Women as Artists Since the Renaissance . Watson-Guptill, 2000. ISBN 0823058743
- Seeing Ourselves: Women's Self-Portraits. (first edition) Harry N. Abrams, 1998. ISBN 0-8109-4188-0
- Civilizing Caliban: The Misuse of Art, 1875-1980. Routledge Kegan & Paul, 1987. ISBN 0710206755
- The New Art History. co-authored with A.L. Rees. Camden Press, May 1986. ISBN 0948491078
- Women Artists: A Graphic Guide. co-authored with Natacha Ledwidge, Camden Press, 1986. ISBN 0948491051

=== Articles ===
- Auchmuty, Rosemary, Borzello, Frances, Davis Langdell, Cheri. “The Image of Women's Studies.” Women's Studies International Forum, vol. 6, no. 3, 1983, pp. 291–298, doi:10.1016/0277-5395(83)90054-7.
- Borzello, Frances. “Helene Schjerfbeck: And Nobody Knows What I'm Like.” Woman's Art Journal, vol. 25, no. 1, 2004, pp. 48–50. JSTORS, doi:10.2307/3566500.
- Borzello, Frances. “Tea, Toilets & Typewriters: Women's Clubs in London.” History Today, vol. 58, no. 12, Dec. 2008.

== See also ==
- Women in the art history field
