= Liz Rideal =

British photographer (1954)

- Born: 1954 (age 71–72); Aylesbury, England
- Education: Exeter University & Exeter College of Art and Design
- Known for: Photography, writing art history books

Marie Elisabeth Chichester Rideal (born 1954 in Aylesbury, Buckinghamshire) is a British artist, art historian, educator and author. She is a Professor in Fine Art in the Painting Department at the Slade School of Fine Art, University College London and was a lecturer and educational resource writer at the National Portrait Gallery, London. She is known for her early artwork, fine art photography made using a photo-booth. Rideal currently lives and works in London, England.

== Early life and education ==
Born in May 1954 in Aylesbury, Buckinghamshire, England. Rideal attended Exeter University and art college and received her B.A. in Fine Arts and English Literature in 1976 and later earned her Post Graduate Certificate in Education in 1978. Since 1992 she has been lecturing at Slade School of Fine Art, which is part of University College London.

== Photography ==
In 1985, Rideal started working exclusively with the photo-booth, creating a number of public art projects and investigating ways of using photographic strip digits within photographic collages literally making light drawings using hand gestures in the photo-booth. Many artists have toyed with this low-budget technology, but few have explored its formal possibilities so extensively as this photographer.

Rideal's artwork is held in public collections including Tate, British Museum, BBC, Bibliothèque Nationale, Paris, the National Portrait Gallery (London), Vancouver Art Gallery, Victoria and Albert Museum, Brandts Museum of Photographic Art (Denmark), LACMA, Metropolitan Museum of Art, NY. Also in

== Bibliography ==
=== Books ===
- Mirrirror: Self-y n ArtisRi and contributions by Frances Borzello and Whitney Chadwick, Watson-Guptill, 2002. ISBN 0823030717
- Insights: Self-portraits: National Portrait Gallery Insights, National Portrait Gallery, London, 2005; ISBN 1855143631
- How to Read Art: A Crash Course in Understanding and Interpreting Paintings, Bloomsbury, London, 2014. ISBN 9781472525123
- How to Read Art: A Crash Course in Understanding and Interpreting Paintings, Rizzoli, New York, 2015. ISBN 978-0-7893-2916-5
- Madam & Eve: Women Portraying Women, co-authored with Kathleen Soriano, Laurence King Publishing, London, 2018, ISBN 1786271567

=== Contributions ===
- The Erotic Cloth: Seduction and Fetishism in Textiles, ed. Millar and Kettle, Bloomsbury Academic, 2018, contributions from Rideal are a chapter titled, "Erotic Cloth echoes in film."
- 500 Self-portraits, published by Phaidon, 2018., contributions from Rideal are a new introduction.

== Awards ==
- 2016–2017 – Leverhulme Fellowship
- 2011 – British Academy, an award to work in India
- 2008–2009 – Rome Wingate Scholarship in Fine Art at the British School at Rome
- 2005 – British Council
- 2004 – The Lorne Scholarship & University College London, Dean's Travel Award
- 2002 – Riba (Special Mention for Glass Drapes at the Birmingham Hippodrome)
- 1997 – London Arts Board, Individual Artist Award
- 1988 – West Midlands & Northern Arts
- 1987 – Eastern Arts
- 1986 – Scottish Arts Council
- 1982 – South East Arts

== See also ==
- Women in the art history field
