= James Dobbin =

James Dobbin is the name of:

- Jim Dobbin (1941–2014), British Labour Party Member of Parliament
- James C. Dobbin (1814–1857), American Congressman and Secretary of the Navy
- Jim Dobbin (footballer) (born 1963), Scottish former professional football player
- Jim Dobbin (Canadian football) (born 1920s), Canadian football player

== See also ==
- James Dobbins (disambiguation)
