= Homecoming – A Scottish Fantasy =

Studio album by Nicola Benedetti
- Released: 4 July 2014
- Genre: Classical, Scottish
- Length: 76:00
- Label: Decca Records

Homecoming – A Scottish Fantasy is the seventh studio album by Scottish violinist Nicola Benedetti. She describes it as a deeply personal blend of classical and Scottish traditional music. The more classical tracks are performed with the BBC Scottish Symphony Orchestra (tracks 1–5, 7, 14). The Gaelic songs are sung by Julie Fowlis (tracks 11, 13).

== Track listing ==
1-4. Max Bruch, Scottish Fantasy

I Introduction: Grave - Adagio cantabile
II Scherzo: Allegro
III Andante sostenuto
IV Finale: Allegro guerriero

5. Robert Burns, Ae Fond Kiss
6. Robert Burns, Auld Lang Syne Variations
7. Robert Burns, My Love is Like a Red Red Rose
8. James Scott Skinner, Hurricane Set
9. James Scott Skinner, The Dean Brig o' Edinburgh

Banks Hornpipe

10. Phil Cunningham, Aberlady
11. Mouth Music and Tunes Set

I Bothan a bh'aig Fionnghuala (traditional)
II The Appropriate Dipstick (Phil Cunningham & Iain MacDonald)
III Meal do bhrògan (traditional)
IV Hogties (Phil Cunningham)

12 Phil Cunningham, The Gentle Light that Wakes Me
13 Coisich a rùin (traditional)
14 Bonnie Banks of Loch Lomond (traditional)
