= Kathleen Soriano =

British independent arts curator, writer and television broadcaster

- Born: 18 July 1963 (age 63); London, England
- Education: University of Leicester
- Years active: 1989 – present
- Known for: Ex-Director of Exhibitions - Royal Academy of Arts
- Television: Artist of the Year
- Spouse: Peter Greenhough
- Children: Martha
- Parents: Salvador Soriano (father); Kathleen O'Neill (mother)

Kathleen Soriano (born 18 July 1963) is a British independent arts curator, writer and television broadcaster.

== Background ==
Kathleen Soriano was born in 1963 in London to parents Salvador Soriano and Kathleen O'Neill. She is of Spanish heritage. Soriano studied at the University of Leicester from 1982 until 1985 and obtained a Bachelor of Arts Honours in History of Art and English. In 1995 she married Peter Greenhough.

== Career ==
Her first major role in the arts was with the Royal Academy of Arts where she worked until 1989. In 1989 she joined the National Portrait Gallery, London as its Head of Exhibitions and Collections. She remained with the Gallery until 2006.

In 2004, Soriano became a Clore Fellow at the Clore Leadership Programme during its inaugural year. The Clore Fellowship is a programme that aims to develop cultural leaders. She carried out her secondment at the South Bank Centre with Michael Lynch and the Art Gallery of New South Wales, Sydney.

In February 2006, she left the National Portrait Gallery and became the director at Compton Verney in Warwickshire. In 2007, Soriano became one of three judges who selected 238 works from 1600 entries from across the West Midlands for the Birmingham Open Art Exhibition.

In late 2008, she was appointed the new director of exhibitions at the Royal Academy of Arts, replacing the retiring Sir Norman Rosenthal who had held the post for 31 years. This was a new position replacing the former Exhibitions Secretary post. She took up the role in January 2009. During her time at the Royal Academy of Arts she developed exhibitions such as Bronze, David Hockney, Van Gogh, and Degas. In 2013, she curated the exhibition Australia at the Royal Academy. It featured both Aboriginal heritage and Australian art covering 200 years. She left the Royal Academy in 2014 and was replaced by Tim Marlow.

In 2013, Soriano joined the television show Sky Arts Artist of the Year as one of the three expert judges. She is continuing in this the role in the 2023 series, alongside Kate Bryan and Tai-Shan Schierenberg.

From April 2014, Soriano began working independently as an art curator and on other cultural projects. She was one of five judges of the Place Prize for Choreography in 2008 when Adam Linder won the main prize.

In October 2016, Soriano was appointed as the chair of the board of trustees for the Liverpool Biennial, replacing Paula Ridley.

During January 2018, she curated the London Art Fair's 30th Anniversary - Art of the Nation: Five Artists Choose. In early 2019, she curated an exhibition of the works of Harald Sohlberg for the Dulwich Picture Gallery, the first exhibition of his works in the UK.

Soriano was appointed chair of the Art UK charity in December 2022, replacing Charles Gregson. In January 2025, Soriano became the interim director of Hastings Contemporary.

== Publications ==
- Liz Rideal and Kathleen Soriano (16 April 2018). Madam and Eve: Women Portraying Women
- Tai-Shan Schierenberg, Kathleen Soriano, and Kate Bryan (6 November 2014). Portrait Artist of the Year: A Little Book of Portraits
- Richard Davey, Kathleen Soriano, Christian Weikop (29 September 2014). Anselm Kiefer
- Wally Caruana, Franchesca Cubillo, Anna Gray, Deborah Hart, Thomas Keneally, Ron Radford, Kathleen Soriano and Daniel Thomas (4 February 2014). Australia
- Kathleen Soriano, Emmanuel Cooper and Xavier Salomon (30 April 2010). Compton Verney

== Filmography ==
=== Films ===
- Mirrors to Windows: The Artist as Woman (2015)

=== Television ===
- Portrait Artist of the Year (2013-2025)
- Landscape Artist of the Year (2015-2026)
