= Kate Dobbin =

Irish artist

- Born: Kate Wise; 1868; Bristol, England
- Died: 1955 (aged 86-87); Cork, Ireland
- Education: Crawford Municipal School of Art
- Known for: Painting
- Spouse: Alfred Graham Dobbin

Kate Dobbin RHA (1868–1955) was a British watercolourist who specialised in impressionistic watercolours of Irish country scenes and still-lives of flowers.

== Life ==
Dobbin was born Kate Wise in Bristol, England in 1868. She moved to Cork in 1887, where she met and married Cork's High Sheriff and merchant, Alfred Graham Dobbin. Dobbin studied at the Crawford Municipal School of Art from 1891 to 1895 under the tuition Harry Scully. Dobbin died in the South Infirmary Victoria University Hospital, Cork in 1955.

== Artistic work ==
Dobbins' impressionistic style has been compared to that of Rose Maynard Barton. From 1894 to 1947, she contributed more than 100 artworks to the Royal Hibernian Academy's Annual Exhibition in Dublin. Her speciality was landscapes of County Cork and Connemara, but she also produced flower paintings and a small number of portraits. Water Colour Society of Ireland exhibited her work from 1899 until her death. Her work was also exhibited by the Munster Fine Art Club and the Fine Art Society in London. Dobbin suffered with severe arthritis, but continued to paint into her 80s.

Dobbin's work was not only of rural landscapes, but also the streets, the rivers and estuaries of Cork city. Dobbin and her husband Sir Alfred Dobbin are both represented in the collection of the Crawford Art Gallery, Cork, Ireland.
