= Chris Levine =

UK-based artist (born 1960)

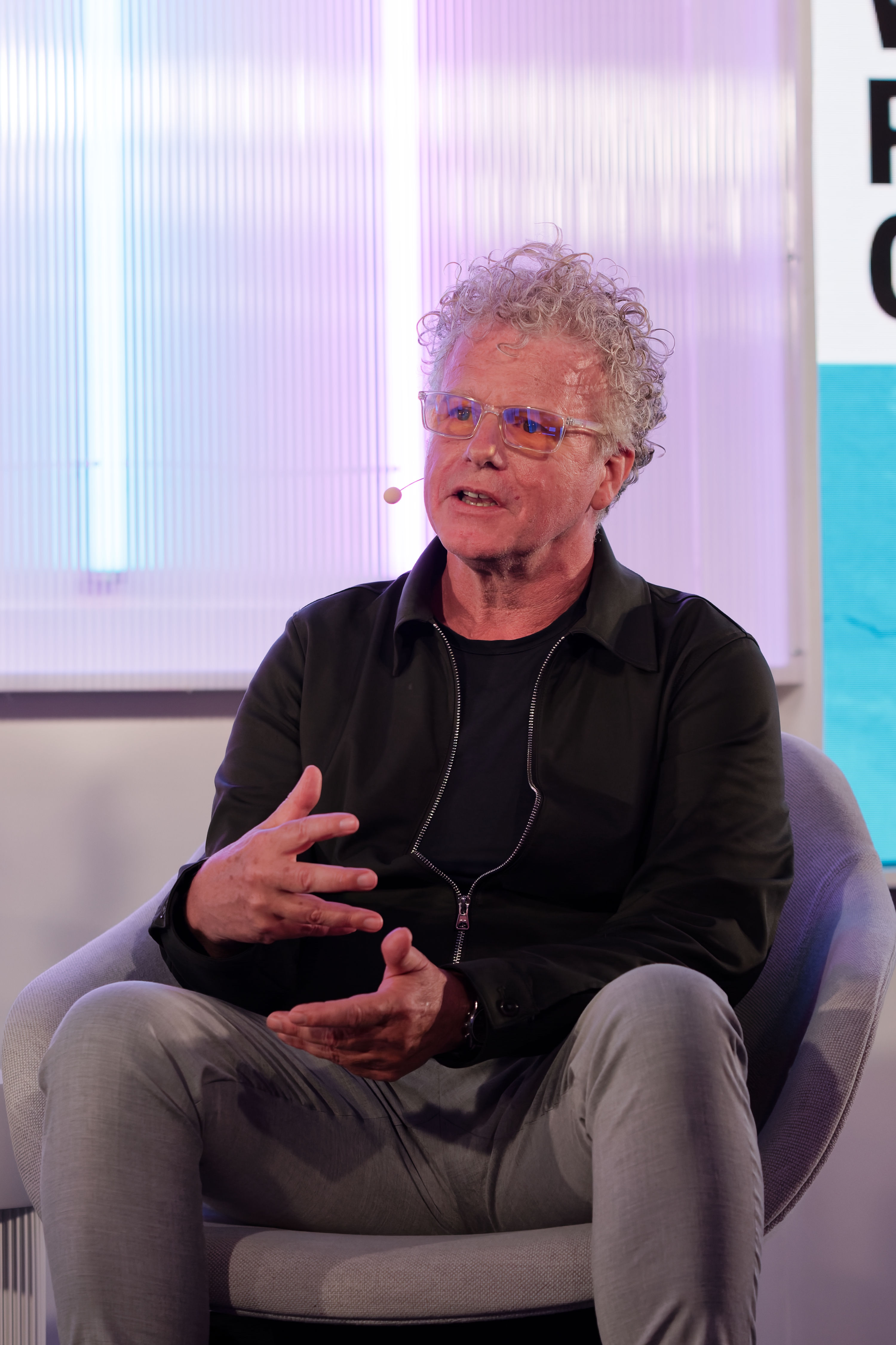
Chris Levine in 2026

Chris Levine is a light artist with a multi-disciplinary approach that harnesses a diverse array of technology with the intention of revealing the ways in which light is fundamental to human experience. Levine uses a cross-disciplinary approach working across many fields including music, performance, installation, fashion, and design in a multitude of collaborative projects. He has worked with a wide range of collaborators, including Antony and the Johnsons, Philip Treacy, Massive Attack, Grace Jones, Asprey Jewelers, BMW, Absolute Vodka, Mario Testino and has an ongoing relationship with The Eden Project. Levine is driven by a deep-rooted desire to expand perception and guide the viewer to a meditative engagement with the present moment. His portraits are internationally recognised but he is not a portrait artist in the traditional sense. Levine is known for creating the Lightness of Being and Equanimity, both portraits of Queen Elizabeth II. Equanimity was commissioned by the Jersey Heritage Trust in 2004 and on 1 June 2012, a £100 note was issued to commemorate the Diamond Jubilee of Queen Elizabeth II based on the portrait. At the heart of Levine's practice are his immersive light Installation art projects in which he has endeavoured to take art out of the gallery environment into a real world, mass participatory experience.

Levine has five separate works in the permanent collection of the National Portrait Gallery.

In 2019 Chris Levine's portrait 'Banksy [3D]' sold for almost ten times the estimate at Sotheby's MIB auction.

According to the Artnet Price Database, Levine's record at auction is £187,500 ($234,023), achieved for another print of Lightness of Being, sold at Sotheby's London in 2017.

Levine has been the subject of features in The Financial Times, The New York Times, Le Monde, Der Spiegel, BBC, CNN, Time Magazine, The Telegraph, The Guardian, GQ Magazine, Tatler, Forbes and others.

== Exhibitions ==
In 2011 his work was included in “Other Worldy” at The Museum of Arts and Design in New York.

In 2012 his work featured in The Queen: Art and Image at London's National Portrait Gallery which travelled to National Museum, Cardiff, National Gallery, Scotland; Ulster Museum, Belfast. In 2012 his work was also included in Out of Focus at The Saatchi Gallery. Levine was also part of the Digital Darkroom Exhibition at The Annenberg Foundation in Los Angeles 2012. He has artwork in the Science Museum in London and has staged light performances in association with the Museum of Modern Art in New York at Radio City Music Hall. His exhibition Hypervisual 1.2 completed a tour of 12 countries with the British Council.

To mark Queen Elizabeth II's Diamond Jubilee, Levine partnered with Asprey to create a new work based upon his seminal 2004 portrait Equanimity. This new work is entitled The Diamond Queen. Asprey re-created the Queen's diamond diadem, worn at the Coronation in 1953.

In June 2013 he exhibited Light 3.142 at The Fine Art Society on New Bond Street curated by Kate Bryan and featuring his new body of work She's Light with Kate Moss as the subject, the image was officially launched afterwards in Selfridges corner window for Charlotte Tilbury's event.

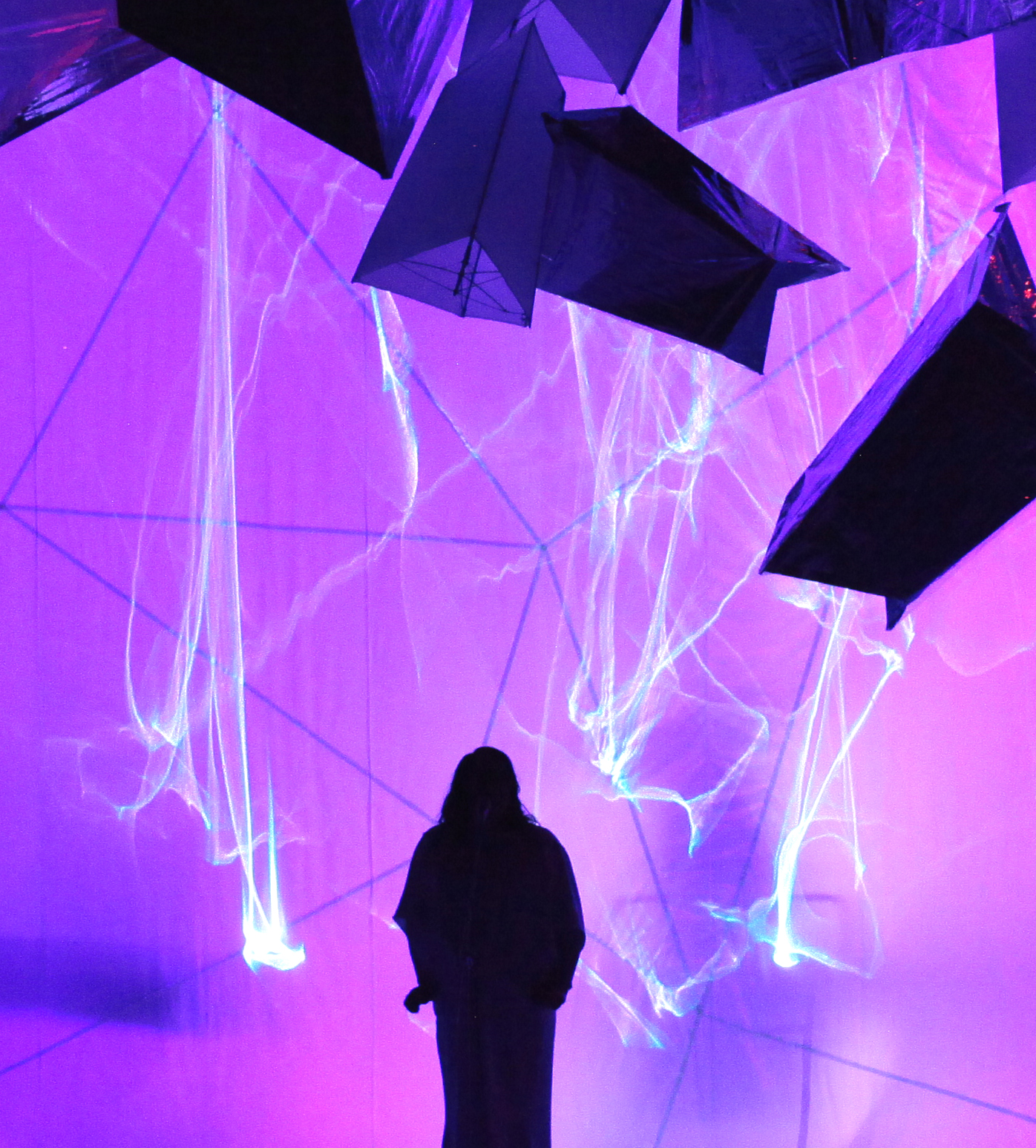
Antony and The Johnsons, Royal Opera House London

In July 2013 Chris staged a light performance at The Royal Opera House with Antony and The Johnsons for the second tour of Swan Lights.

In November 2013, Chris Levine was commissioned by the National Portrait Gallery to create a portrait of Baroness Helena Kennedy of The Shaws QC, FRSA which was unveiled on 26 November and is now situated in Room 38a in the Ground floor Lerner Contemporary Galleries at the National Portrait Gallery, London.

In March 2013 Chris Levine's bespoke light installation Man by Ida by Chris and FusionBox AM's soundscape filled the Ondaatje Wing Main Hall at The National Portrait Gallery. The Salon De Lumière was inspired by the Man Ray portraits exhibition, which paid homage to Man Ray, considered the original ‘Master of Light’. In December 2014, Chris Levine teamed up with electronic producer and composer Jon Hopkins to present the premiere of the iy_project at Wonderfruit in Thailand. The set was an offshoot from his work with Eden Project and combined Levine's light installations with Hopkins' music.

In October 2015 Levine staged an immersive light installation 'Angel Presence' at the Danish Church, Regent's Park, London in association with Swarovski.

In 2016 Levine exhibited Mr Kubrick is Looking a piece made by projecting LED light into the viewer's periphery at the exhibition Daydreaming with Stanley Kubrick at Somerset House curated by James Lavelle and James Putnam in partnership with Canon and additional support from the Blavatnik Family Foundation.

In 2016 Levine received a commission to commemorate the 950th anniversary of the Battle of Hastings. Launching the Root 1066 International Festival, Levine created a light triangulation with three lasers, two placed at opposite ends of the coast that joined a third laser on Hastings Pier.

In 2017 Levine staged ‘iy_project in the Dark Park’, at DARK MOFO Festival in Tasmania. The festival is billed as Tasmania's largest contemporary music festival and showcases the work of artists in a broad range of art forms, including sound, noise, dance, theatre, visual art, performance & new media.

In 2018 Chris Levine's major solo show 'Inner [Deep] Space' was exhibited at Park Village studios during the Frieze London, it was listed on the Frieze VIP program. David Furnish and Chris Levine hosted the preview night of the exhibition.

In 2021, Levine mounted a solo exhibition at prestigious Houghton Hall. The highlight of the show was a ten story tall, steel sculpture weighing more than six tonnes and titled Molecule Of Light. https://www.tatler.com/article/britains-master-of-light-chris-levine-illuminates-houghton-hall-for-the-estates-inaugural-autumnwinter-exhibition

== Charity ==
Chris Levine has been involved in eight different EJAF galas since 2018 taking place in London, the South Of France, New York City and Los Angeles with total monies raised at over £3M, along with amfAR donations in Mexico City, NYC, Hong Kong and Cannes, The Starlight Foundation, Teen Cancer America, The Aspinall Foundation, The Queen's Platinum Jubilee Fund, CORE, UNICEF and a number of other charities.

In 2019 Chris Levine donated a work at an auction hosted by Elton John for the Elton John Aids Foundation which raised $360,000.

In 2023, Chris created a 3-D lenticular portrait of Elton John specifically for EJAF. https://www.ft.com/content/fbc732e3-4afa-4400-988a-f5c8ff4cf5b8
