= Calum Stevenson =

Scottish artist

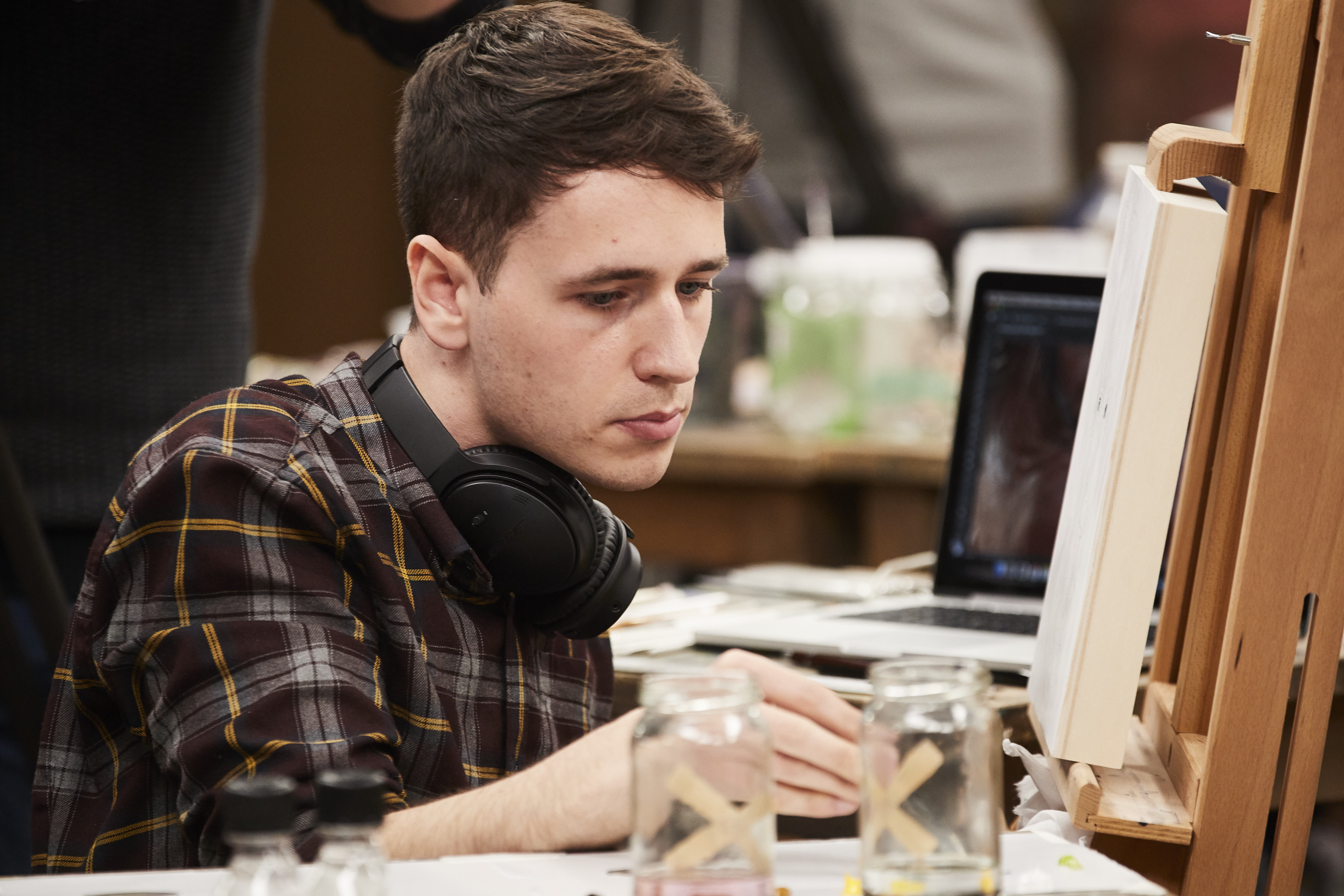
- Calum Stevenson in 2021
- Born: 17 December 1997 (age 28); Falkirk, Scotland
- Education: Duncan of Jordanstone College of Art & Design (2015–2019) Glasgow School of Art (2019-2020)
- Occupation: Contemporary Artist

Calum Stevenson (born 1997) is a Scottish contemporary artist.

Stevenson graduated with a BA(Hons) in Fine Arts from Duncan of Jordanstone College of Art & Design in 2019 and went on to graduate from Glasgow School of Art with a MA in Fine Art Practice in 2020.

In 2021, Stevenson became the youngest and first ever Scottish artist to win Sky Portrait Artist of the Year. In the final, Stevenson painted Barry Humphries from life, winning a £10,000 commission to paint Nicola Benedetti for the Scottish National Portrait Gallery. Stevenson’s work is now part of the permanent collection on display in Edinburgh.
