= Szymanowski: Violin Concerto No. 1 =

Studio album by Nicola Benedetti
- Released: 1 June 2005
- Genre: Classical
- Length: 72:39
- Label: Deutsche Grammophon

Nicola Benedetti chronology
Szymanowski: Violin Concerto No. 1 (2005)	Mendelssohn: Violin Concerto (2006)

Szymanowski: Violin Concerto No. 1 is the first studio album by Scottish violinist Nicola Benedetti.

== Album information ==
Benedetti's debut album released on the Deutsche Grammophon label in April 2005 includes Szymanowski's Concerto No. 1, the Chausson Poème, the Havanaise by Saint-Saëns, and a trio of contemplative miniatures by Massenet, Brahms (arranged by Jascha Heifetz) and John Tavener, the last of which, Fragment for the Virgin, was written for her.

The album's release in the USA was in May 2006.

== Track listing ==
1. "Violin Concerto No. 1, Op. 35"
  1. I. Vivace assai - 12:37
  2. II. "Subito vivace assai scherzando" - 8:53
  3. III. "Cadenza" - 5:21
2. "Havanaise for Violin And Orchestra, Op. 83" – 10:13
3. "Poeme for Violin and Orchestra, Op. 25" – 16:41
4. "Meditation From Thais" – 5:31
5. "Wie melodien zieht es mir" – 3:15
6. "Fragment for the Virgin' - 4:18
7. "Vocalise" – 6:11
8. "Meditation From Thais (Backing Track)" – 5:50
