= Dobbins Creek =

Dobbins Creek may refer to:

Each in the United States

- Dobbins Creek (California), a tributary of the Yuba River
- Dobbins Creek, a neighborhood community in Phoenix, Arizona
- Dobbins Creek, a creek that flows through East Side Lake in Austin, Minnesota
