= Rosemary A. Dobbins =

American artist and photographer

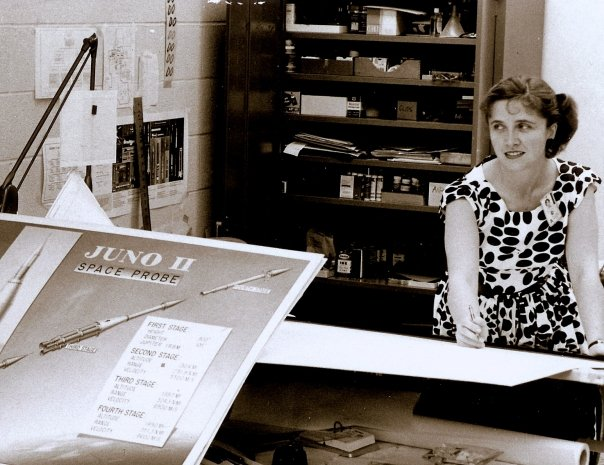
- Born: Rosemary Ann Robbins; September 14, 1927; Hornell, New York
- Died: October 24, 2006 (aged 79); Huntsville, Alabama
- Education: Albright School of Art, Buffalo Academy of the Arts
- Occupations: Artist, photographer
- Title: NASA Illustrator
- Spouse: Edward Dobbins Jr. (1953–2006)
- Children: Holly A. Dobbins
- Parents: U.S. Commissioner Albert W. Robbins (father); Marta Robbins (mother)

Rosemary Ann Dobbins (née Robbins; September 14, 1927 – October 24, 2006) was an American artist and photographer. She is most well known for her work as a technical illustrator and concept artist for NASA, where she created some of the most recognizable artist-rendered images of the American "Space Age". Beyond her NASA career, she was a multi-talented studio artist, photographer, and calligrapher.

== Early life and education ==
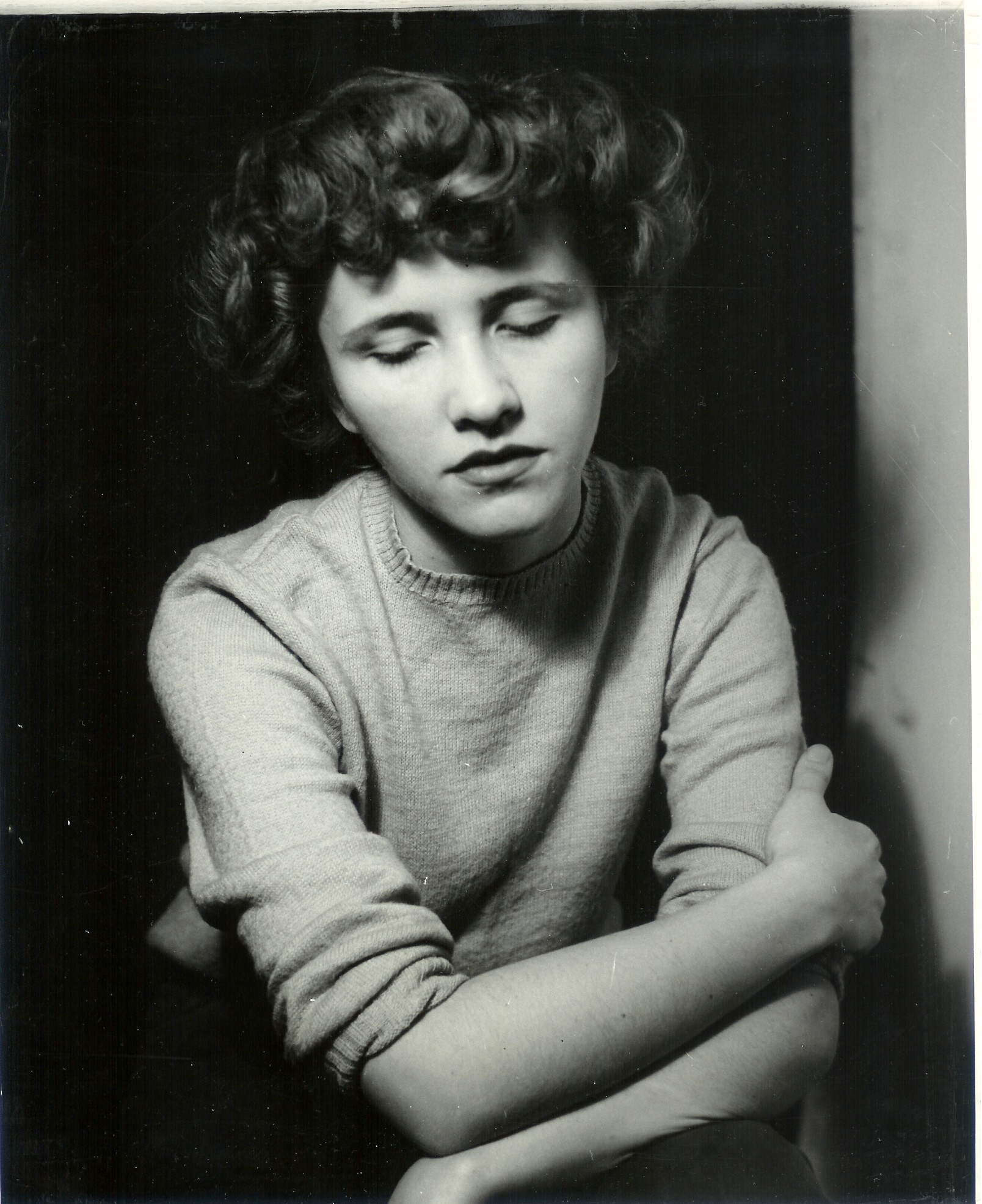
Art school 1948

Rosemary Ann Robbins was born on September 14, 1927, in a small but comfortable house on Maple Street in Hornell, New York. Her parents, Marta and Albert W. Robbins, already had three boys when Rosemary arrived. They viewed her as a "gift". Hers was a loving family, but one that suffered a great deal of hardship.

When she was eight, Rosemary contracted polio, most likely from exposure to the rising waters of the great flood of 1935 during which she and her family spent days assisting others through their hardships. Rosemary was completely paralyzed but still able to breathe; she struggled for several years but was able to overcome it through the use of revolutionary new therapies developed by Elizabeth Kenny. While she regained the ability to walk, her left side remained weak for the rest of her life.

In her early teens her oldest brother and protector, Albert Jr., suffered a head injury from playing college football. This was during the leather helmet era. The trauma to his brain was so severe he had to be committed to a sanitarium where, after many years of care, he eventually died.

At the beginning of WWII, Rosemary's two remaining brothers, Fred and Gary, both volunteered for military service. While still in high school, Rosemary herself worked as a volunteer in the local hospital where her duties included caring for returning soldiers, as well as victims of the 1944 polio outbreak.

In 1946, Robbins graduated from high school and completed secretarial school that same year. Immediately upon graduation, however, Rosemary was stricken with scarlet fever. She overcame this too, managing to recover just in time to start her first semester at art school.

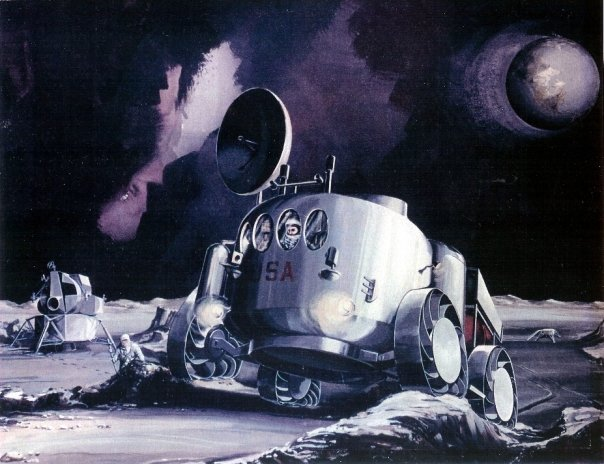
Airbrush Illustration, Lunar Rover Concept Art, Apollo Mission, Rosemary A. Dobbins NASA

From 1947 to 1950, Robbins studied at the Albright School of Art, part of the Buffalo Fine Arts Academy, the buildings of which today house the Albright-Knox Art Gallery. As a member of the artistic community in Buffalo, Dobbins had many connections to the art scene in New York City, where she traveled frequently and interacted with several well known artists of the period, many of whom would later collectively be known as the New York School. She was heavily influenced by both the Modernists and Abstract Impressionists of the era, yet also possessed a deep love for the painters of the Dutch Golden Age.

== Career ==
=== Pre-NASA career ===
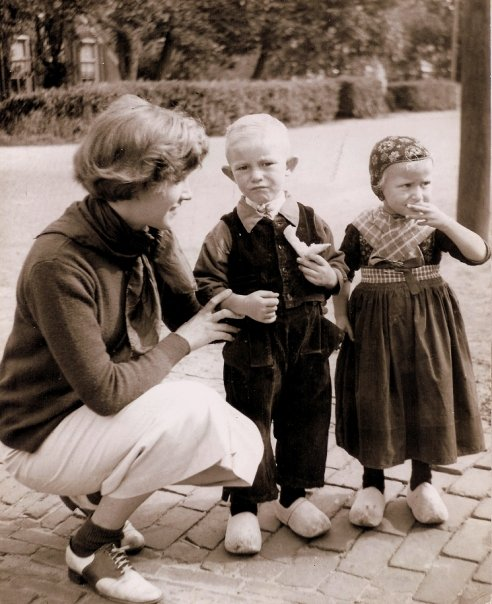
Holland, 1950

Robbins began her career while still in high school working as an artist for the Glidden Pottery in Alfred, New York. At her father's suggestion, she went to secretarial school even as she applied to art school. She was ultimately accepted into the Albright School of Art at the Buffalo Fine Arts Academy. To support herself she worked summers at the local Birds Eye Frozen Foods factory while living in a tent which she shared with two refugee students from the Netherlands. After completing her studies in 1950, Rosemary traveled to Holland by tramp steamer where she took up residence in Rotterdam with fellow artists she met through connections she had made in art school. She arrived just in time to take part in Rotterdam Ahoy! together with the local community of young artists. Based in Holland, she also traveled widely across post-war Europe. Her private archives contain many historically valuable sketchbooks from this period. In 1952, she returned to the U.S. and moved to West Lafayette, Indiana where an uncle had given her a lead on a position as a fashion illustrator and window decorator for a local department store.

Robbins was introduced to her future husband, Lt. Edward B. Dobbins Jr., in West Lafayette through mutual Dutch friends at a local production of Pygmalion. Lt. He was studying aerospace engineering at Purdue University while still actively serving in the military with the U.S. Army Missile Command. After a six-month courtship, they married in 1953; "Mrs. Robbins Dobbins" endured many jokes about her name. After Lt. Dobbins graduated with his Masters, the newlyweds were stationed in Huntsville, Alabama. Upon reentering civilian life in 1957, they moved to California. Lt. Dobbins had been recruited by Lockheed's "Skunk Works", and Rosemary landed jobs in technical illustration first at TRW Aerospace and then later also with Lockheed.

=== NASA career ===
During this time the U.S. Army Missile Command (MICOM) at Redstone Arsenal in Huntsville, Alabama increasingly focused on working toward human spaceflight. In 1950 Dr. Wehrner von Braun had arrived with 117 other German rocket scientists from Peenemünde to take up permanent residence there, and in 1956 he became technical director of a new division, the U.S. Army Ballistic Missile Agency(ABMA). In 1958 Lt. Dobbins was recruited back to MICOM in a civilian capacity to be a Unit Chief in the Propulsion Laboratory; his work in R & D at Redstone fell under the umbrella of ABMA and would eventually be used in the Apollo Program. Edward B. Dobbins Jr. was part of the team that engineered the retrorockets that separated the stages on the Saturn V. Upon their arrival back in Huntsville, Rosemary Dobbins was immediately hired by the newly formed NASA to be one of the key figures in the Art Department at the Marshall Space Flight Center working in both technical illustration as well as concept art. While waiting for her security clearance, Dobbins used the time to perfect her free hand lettering and calligraphy for technical illustration, eventually mastering nearly every form.

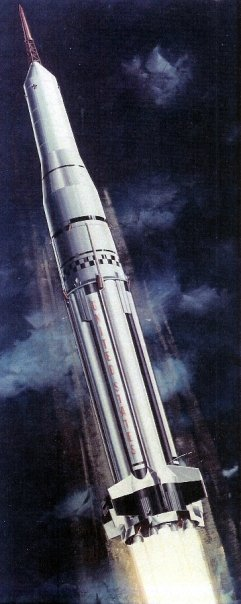
Airbrush Illustration of Saturn I by Rosemary Dobbins, NASA

Dobbins remained at NASA for almost a decade, working during the formative years of the American Space Program. She was also one of the first women in her division to be promoted to management. Artistically, the work was exceedingly challenging as it pre-dated the age of computers in graphic design. Most illustration work was done by airbrush, and all blocking and lettering work had to be done by hand. She worked on every major NASA project including the Juno II, Mercury, and Gemini Programs, but her main focus was on the Apollo Program, and beyond. Some of her later work even included concept art for a future planned moon station. Her illustrations were used in countless presentations, programs, and NASA publications. Many of her pieces have been on display in some of the most well-trafficked spaces of NASA, including a six-foot air-brushed illustration of the Saturn V after lift-off which hung in the main lobby of NASA headquarters for many years. Because her work was done for NASA as a government employee, it was uncredited for decades. Only recently, as NASA has begun to celebrate the work of the women in its early history who were pioneers in their fields, has Rosemary A. Dobbins finally been credited for her iconic artistic legacy.

==== NASA milestones ====
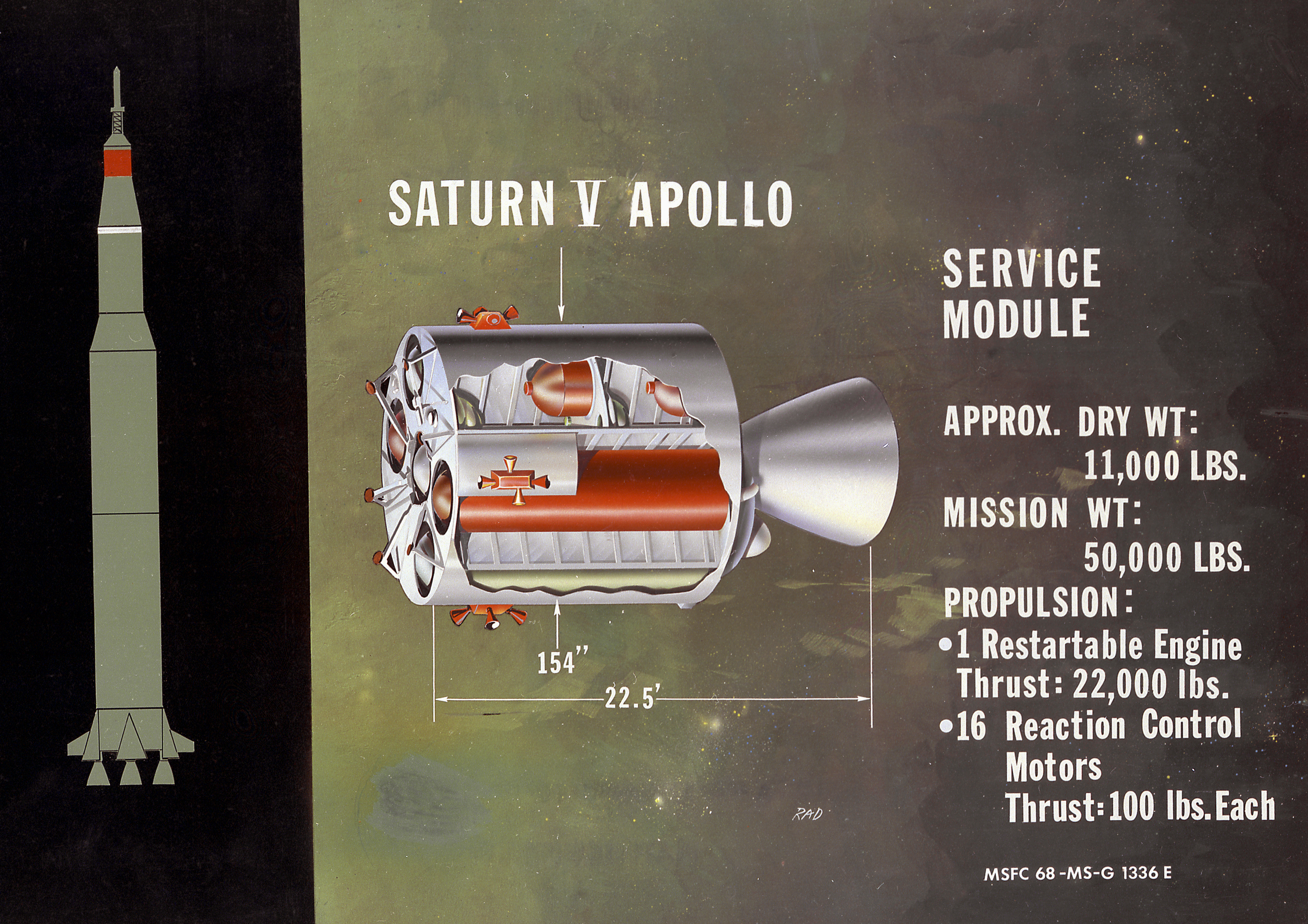
Technical illustration of the Saturn V Service Module, Rosemary Dobbins NASA

Dobbins broke several glass ceilings in her field, first in California and then at NASA. Her excellence and skill with an airbrush, her persistence and determination, along with perfectionism and discipline served her well. At NASA, she actually had two roles, that of illustrator and that of the wife of a rocket scientist. In 1960, NASA split from the U.S. Army Missile Command. When this happened Dr. Edward Dobbins Jr. chose to stay with the Army.

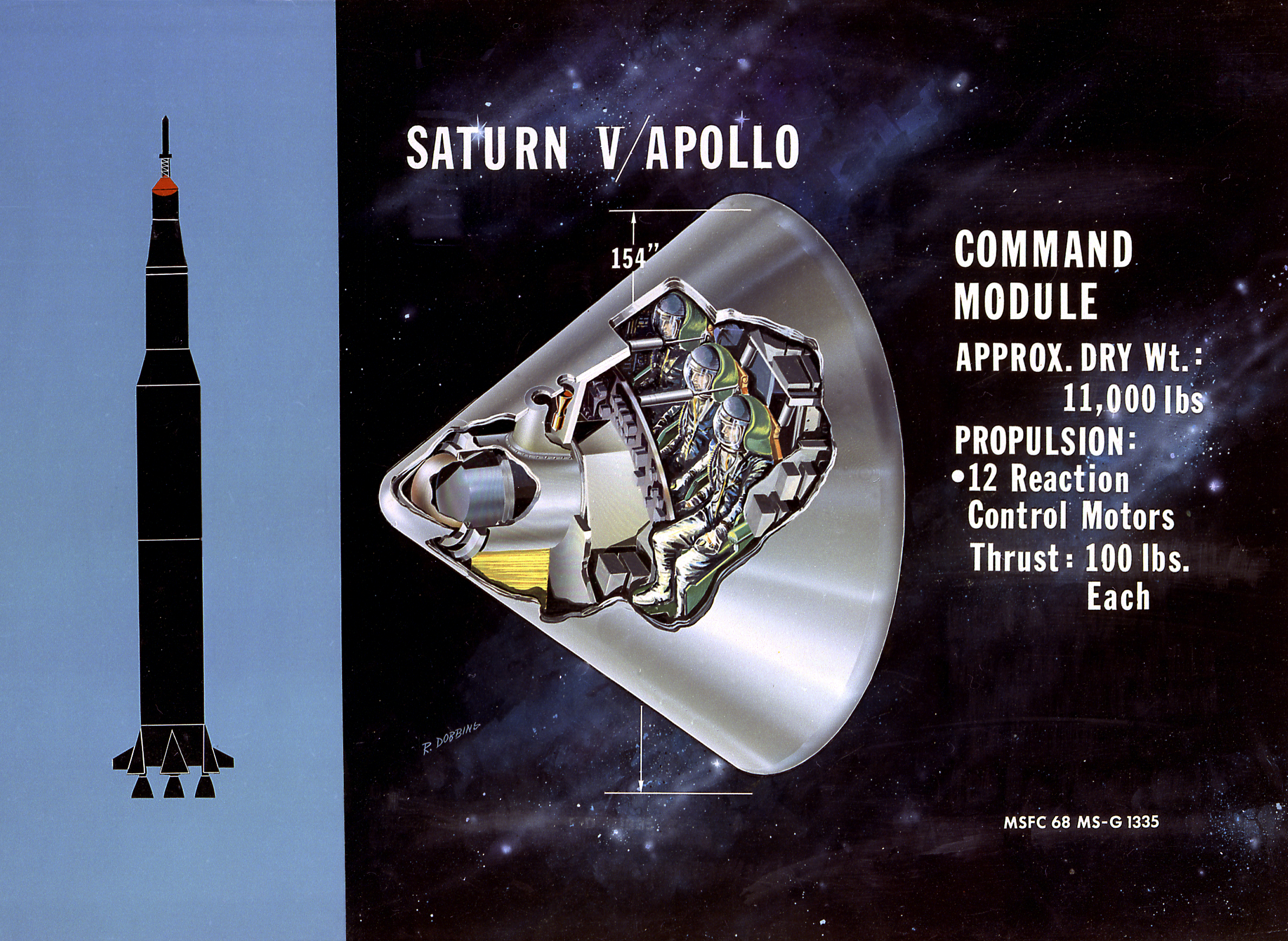
Technical illustration of the Saturn V Command Module, Rosemary Dobbins, NASA

Throughout her career at NASA, Dobbins often faced uphill battles and fought to be accorded the same respect and recognition that was freely given to her male colleagues. In 1967 when she left NASA to raise her daughter, she used the occasion to bring to the attention of the department heads the many injustices she had endured over her decade there. In her final letter she left many recommendations on how to improve conditions for women.

=== Post-NASA career ===
After leaving NASA, Rosemary Dobbins established her own studio, which included a darkroom, and continued to hone her skills in art through study at the University of Alabama in Huntsville. She became a close friend, student and colleague of local artist Jack Dempsey who had been hired by UAH to create their new Art Department. Dempsey tried to recruit Dobbins to teach at UAH, but she declined. While she had accrued over 400 college credits of study beyond her art degree, and was Phi Kappa Phi, she never completed a Bachelor's. She did organize several local artist working groups, and taught in smaller circles out of her studio. On rare occasions she took on commercial commissions, and sold some of her work to select private collectors. During this time Dr. Edward Dobbins Jr. became the Director of the Rocket Propulsion Technology & Management Center at Redstone Arsenal under the R & D Division of MICOM, and Rosemary Dobbins continued with her social responsibilities as part of the "Dobbins Team".

1n 1966 their dream of adopting a child, which they had been pursuing for years, was finally realized when they brought their daughter home toward the end of that year. In 1968 they spent a year in Boston while Edward completed a second master's at MIT as a Sloane Fellow; in 1980 he completed his Ph.D. from UAH. Over the years, even as she raised her daughter, Rosemary continued to produce work out of her studio, constantly experimenting and at the same time attaining mastery over a wide range of mediums including photography, oil, watercolor, acrylic, airbrush, charcoal, ink, and mixed-media. Many of her pieces even included sculptural elements, or found object art. She often fluctuated between hyperrealism - especially in her watercolor work - influenced by Dempsey, and the Impressionism and Modernism of her art school days. In her later studio period, her painting more heavily reflected Abstract Modernism, while in her photography she focused on cultural themes. Her work was featured in local shows and state exhibitions throughout the 1960s, 70s and 80s, and won several awards.

== Social justice involvement ==
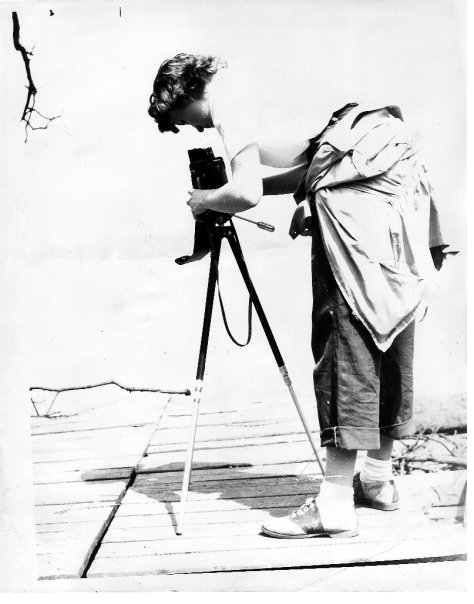
Rosemary A. Dobbins, Photographer 1952

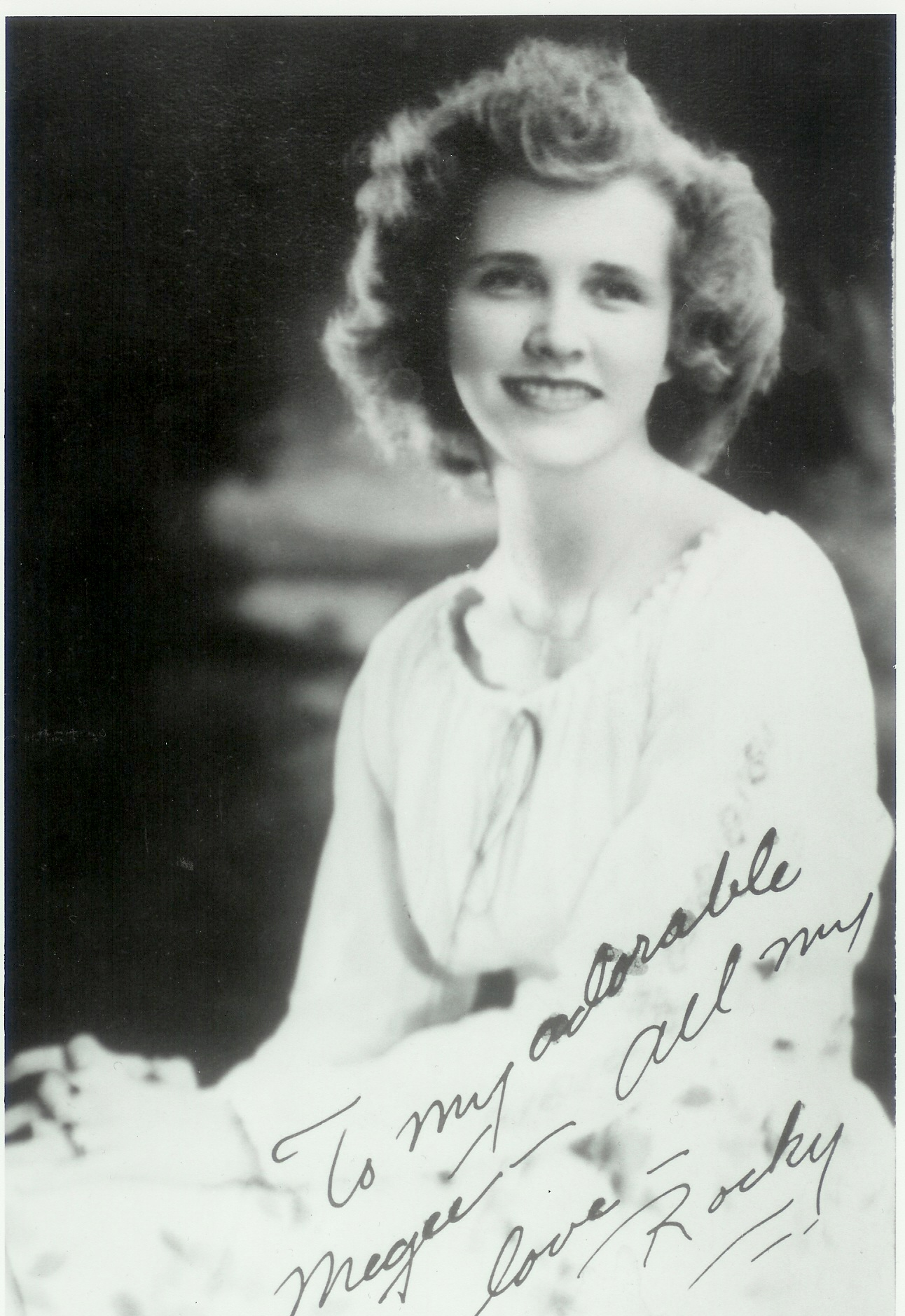
"Rocky" 1944

As the daughter of a U.S. Commissioner, Dobbins witnessed first hand the impacts of both poverty and alcoholism.

As she grew older, she actively fought to right whatever wrongs she encountered. In high school she earned the nickname "Rocky" because she chose to wear her brother's warm flannel shirts and pants to school in winter in an era when girls were only allowed to wear dresses. She was threatened by her Principal with suspension if she did not go home and change, but she stood up for her rights and health. In the end she prevailed, and girls at Hornell High were allowed to dress warmly thereafter.

Later she found herself living in Northern Alabama at the height of the Civil Rights Movement. Rosemary Dobbins and her husband saw firsthand the injustice of the society in which they lived. As government employees they were not allowed to openly express their views, but both found ways to make known their support of Dr. Martin Luther King Jr. and of the movement he led. Rosemary and Edward had each grown up with families who actively pursued social justice. Dr. Dobbins' father, Ed Dobbins Sr., had fought against segregation in San Marcos, Texas decades before Brown vs the Board of Education finally forced the issue.

== Later years and death ==
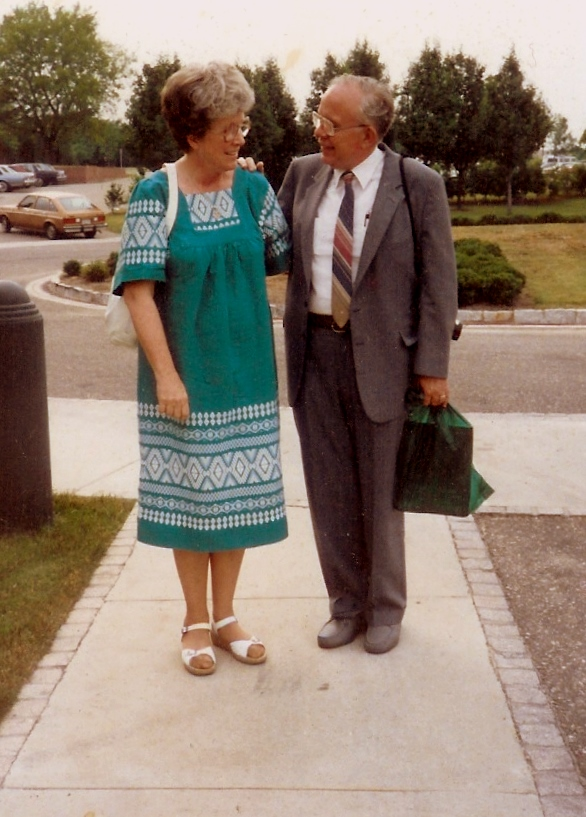
Rosemary & Dr. Edward Dobbins Jr. 1990

Apart from a few years when she moved with her husband to Texas to care for his aging parents, Dobbins spent her later life on Monte Sano Mountain in Huntsville, Alabama, a city she had come to love very deeply. Her work increasingly highlighted social issues or the wonder of nature. In the last few years her weakness from polio finally took its toll, compounded by other health conditions including a stroke; her hands began to tremble. Knowing she could not continue to produce work at the same high standard, in the late 1990s she gave up artwork altogether. She shifted her creative energy instead to music and mastered the clavichord.

After a loving 53 years of marriage, and a long successful career, Dobbins died on October 24, 2006, of heart failure. Her husband Edward passed away 6 years later in October 2012. Their daughter, Dr. Holly A. Dobbins, follows in their footsteps, furthering the cause of social justice and preserving and curating her mother's work. Rosemary and Edward Dobbins' memorial] is located in Maple Hill Cemetery, Huntsville, Alabama.

== Illustrations ==
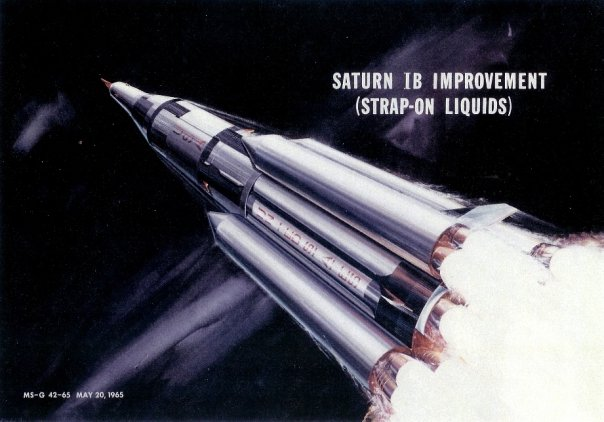
Technical Illustration of the Saturn 1B, airbrush

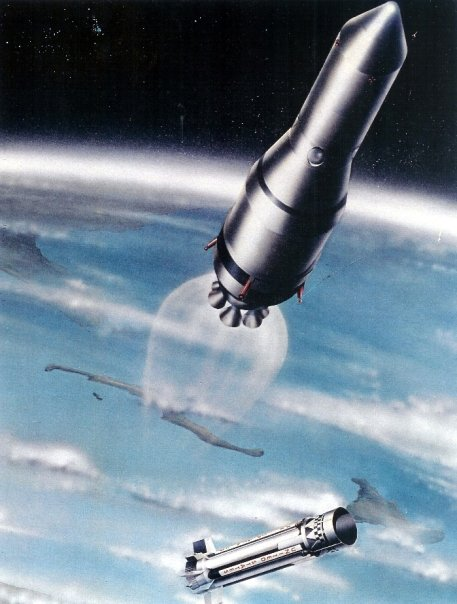
Stage Separation, Saturn I, airbrush

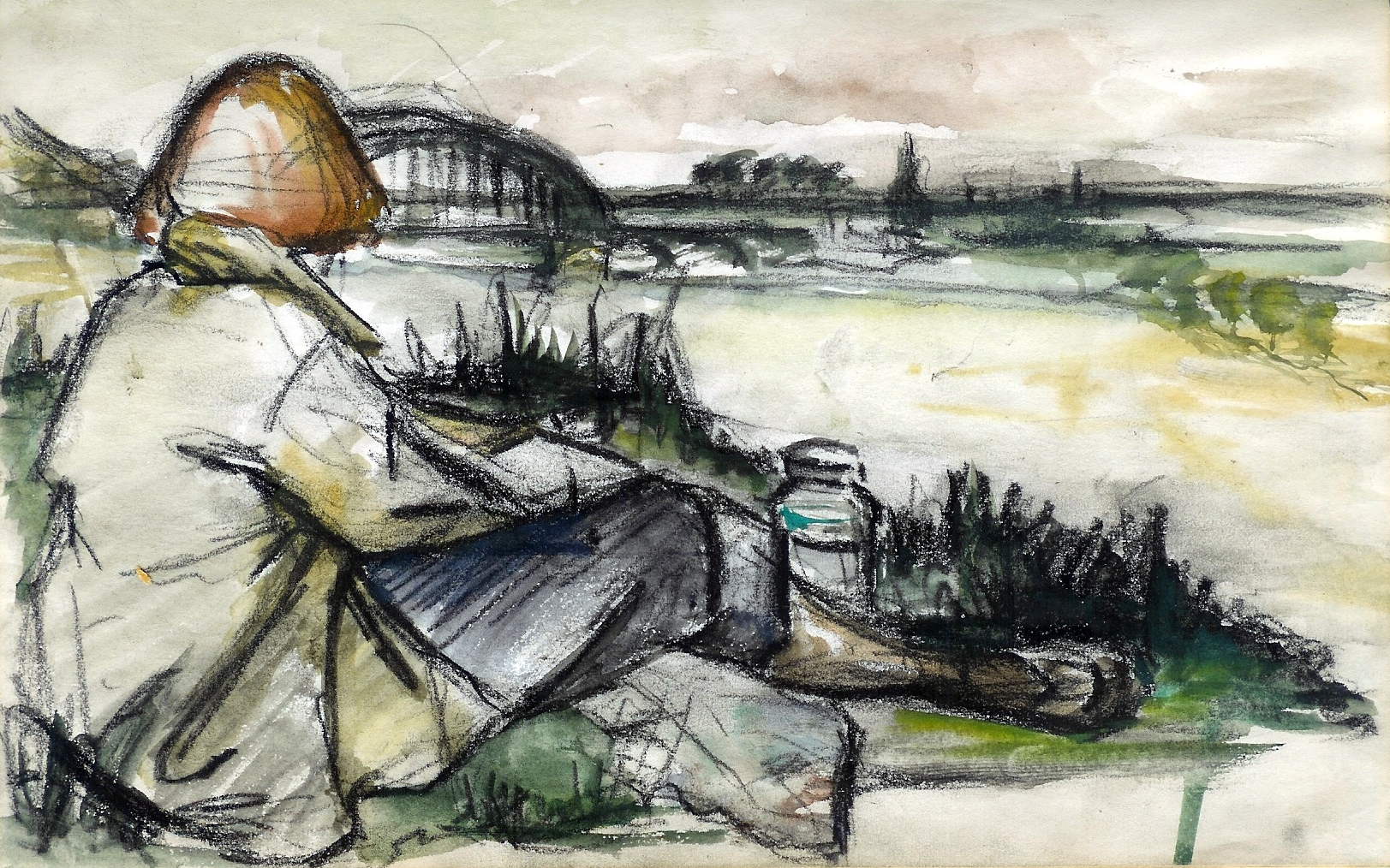
Rotterdam, Self Portrait, Travel Sketch Book 1, #38 1950

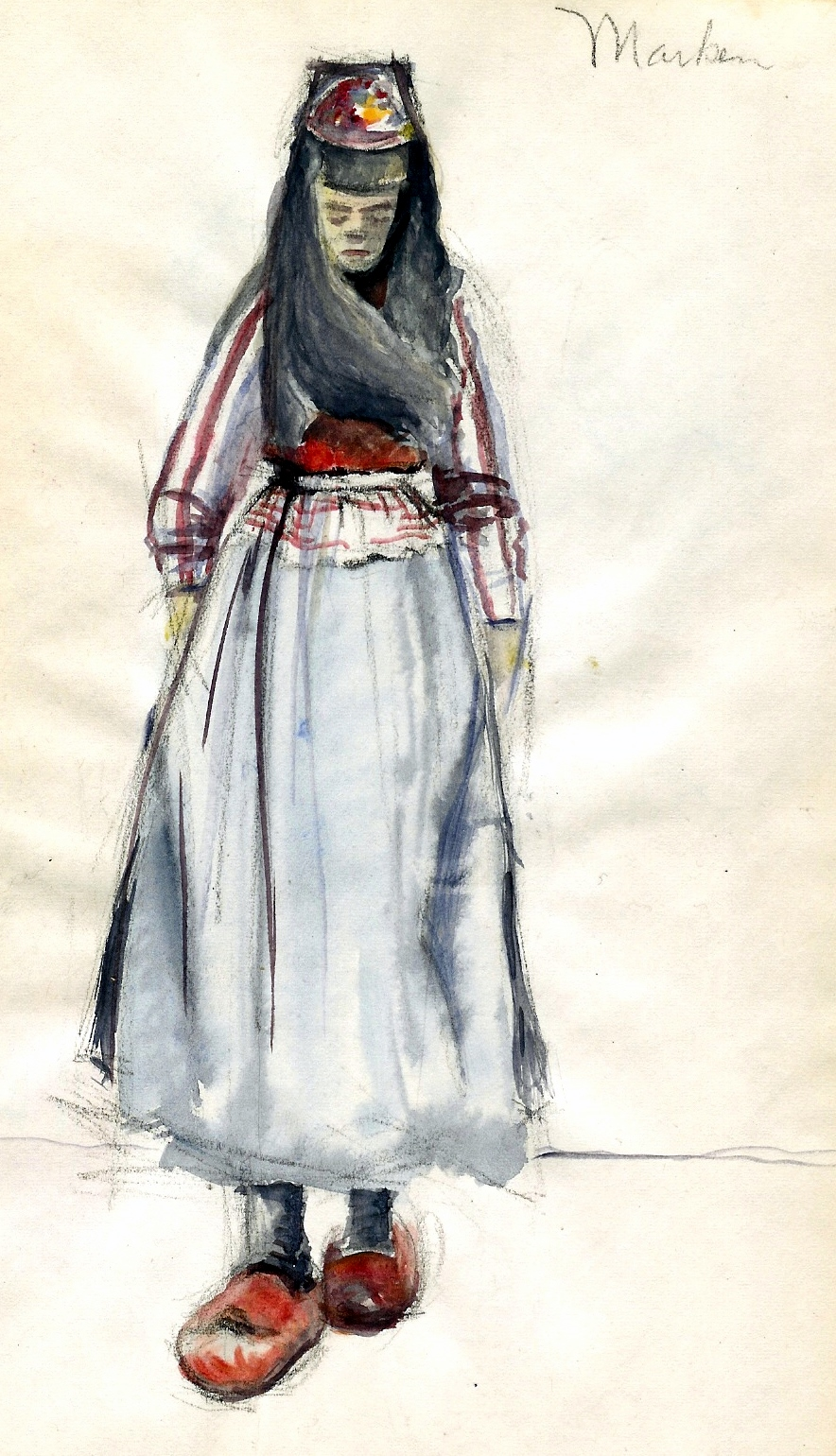
Rotterdam Travel Sketch Book 1 #11 1950

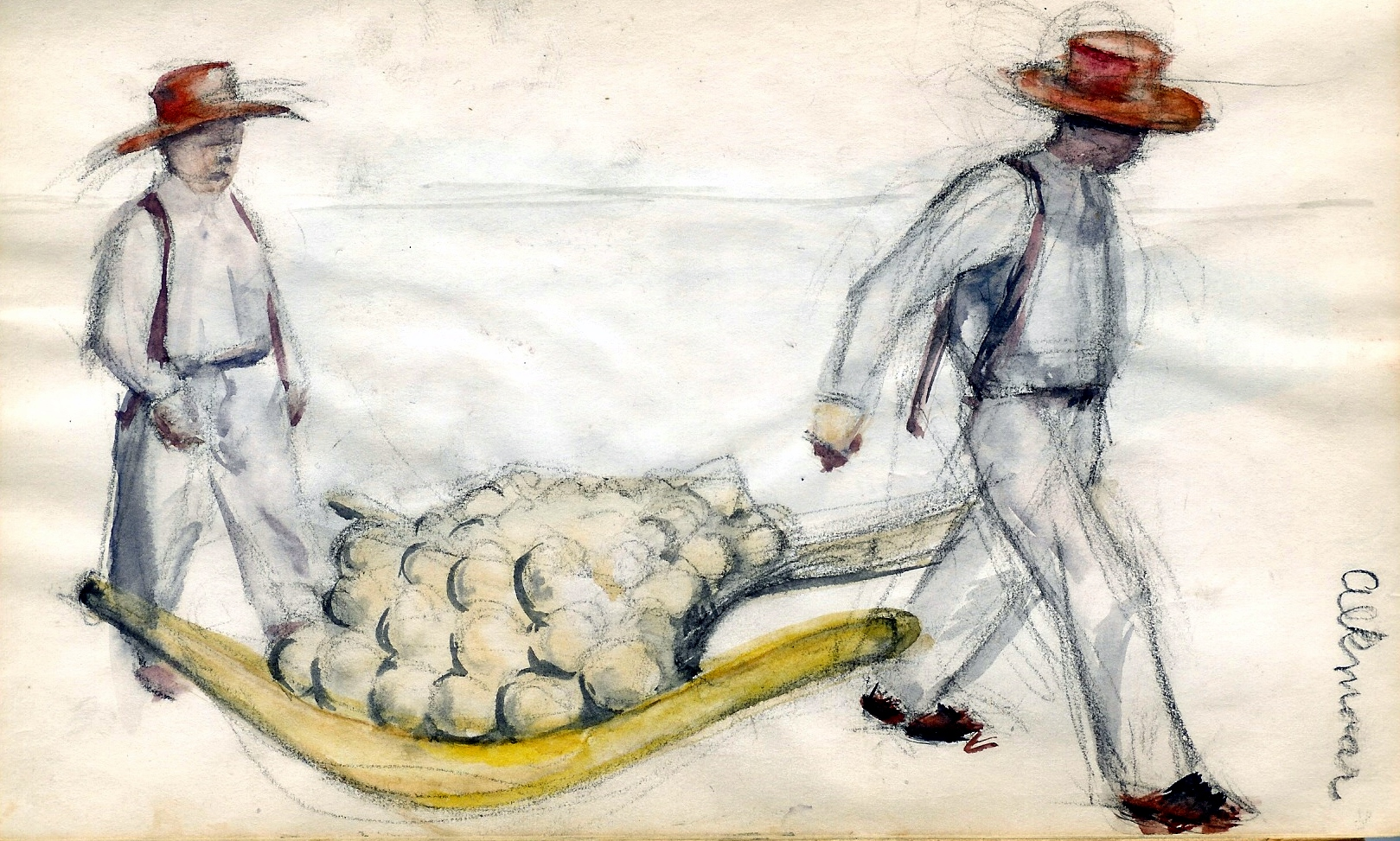
Rotterdam, Travel Sketch Book 1 #12, 1950

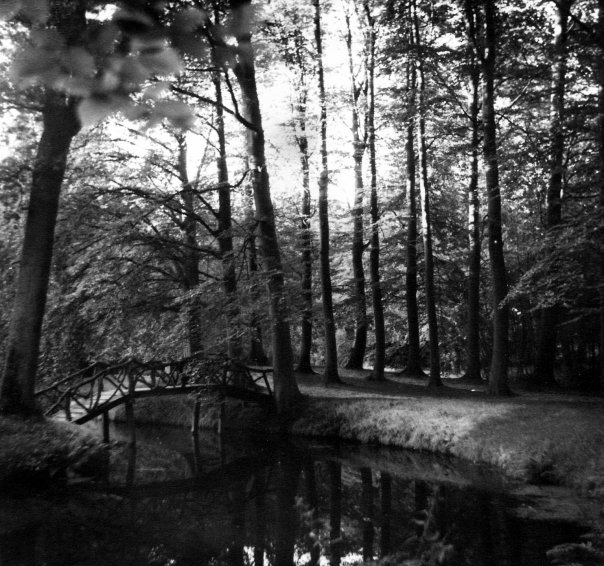
"Bridge in a Dutch Forest" 1950, photograph

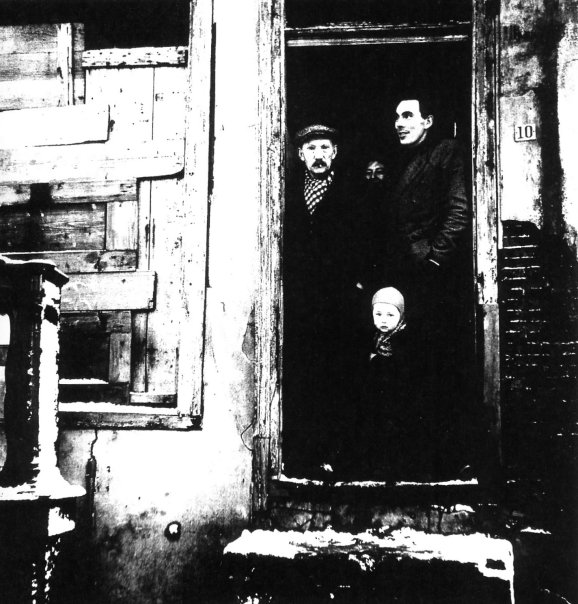
"Threshhold", Holland 1950, photograph

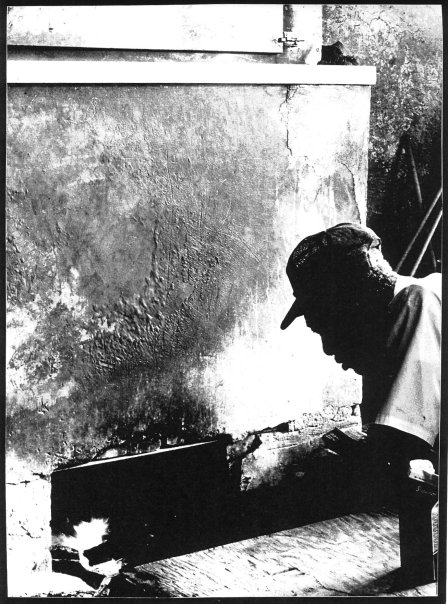
"Stoking the Fire", Alabama 1975, photograph

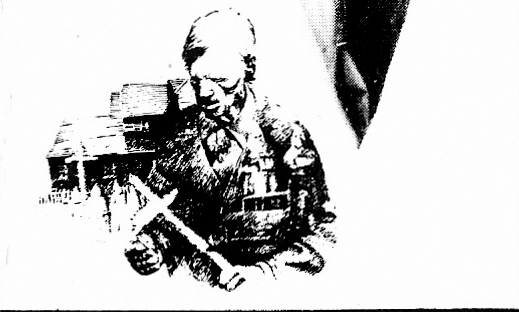
"What lies within", 1975, ink dot

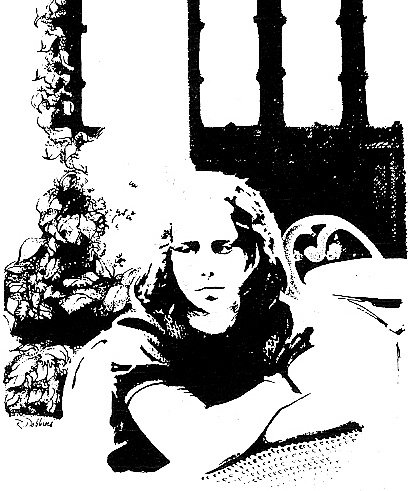
"Girl in the French Quarter", 1977, ink dot

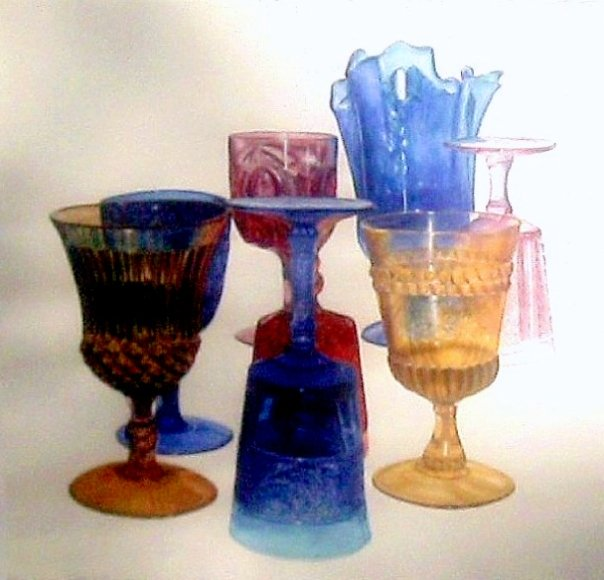
"Study in Glass", 1977, watercolor

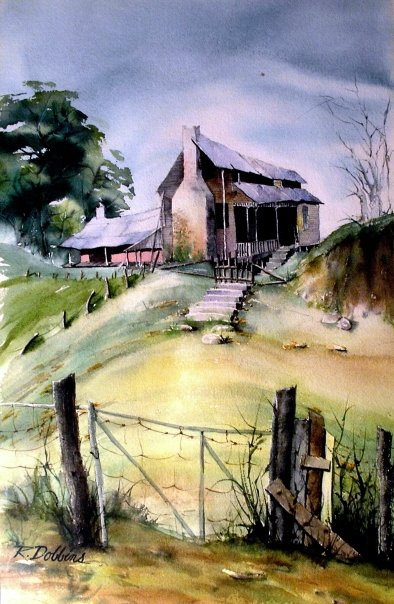
"Moontown", Alabama 1979, watercolor

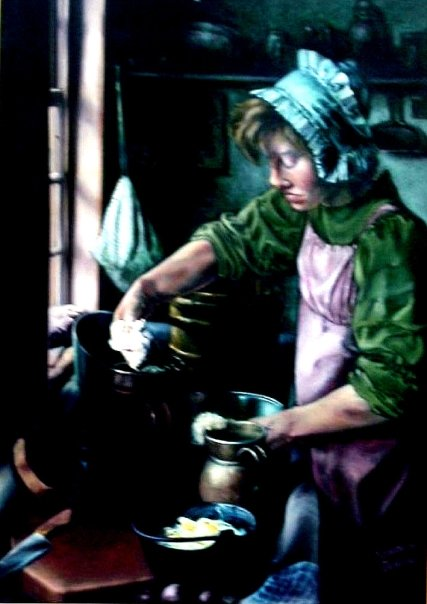
"The Breadmaker" 1979, oil on canvas

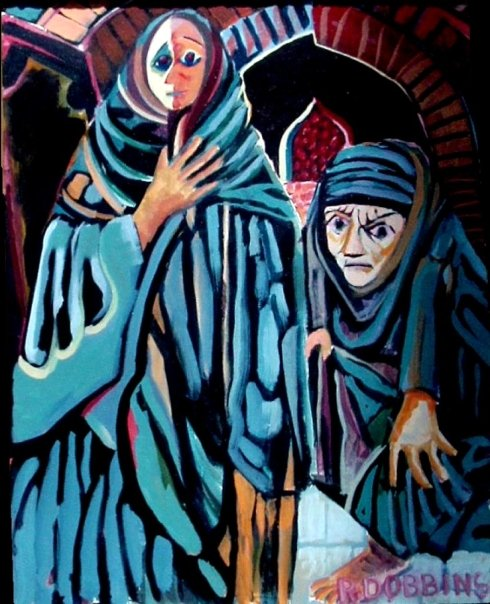
"The Women", 1990, acrylic on canvas
