= Whitney Chadwick =

American art historian and educator (1943–2026)

- Born: July 28, 1943
- Died: August 6, 2026 (aged 83)
- Education: Middlebury College (BA); Pennsylvania State University (PhD)
- Notable work: Women, Art and Society (1990)
- Movement: Contemporary Art; Modern Art; Surrealism; Feminist Art; Gender and sexuality in art
- Spouse: Robert Bechtle (m. 1982–2020; death)
- Website: whitneychadwick.com

Whitney Chadwick (July 28, 1943 – August 6, 2026) was an American art historian and educator, who published on contemporary art, modernism, Surrealism, and gender and sexuality. Her book Women, Art and Society was first published by Thames and Hudson in 1990 and revised in 1997; it is in its fifth edition. Chadwick became Professor Emerita at San Francisco State University from the School of Art in 2009.

== Life and career ==
Whitney Chadwick was born on July 28, 1943. Her undergraduate degree was a B.A. degree in Fine Arts from Middlebury College in 1965. She received her doctorate from Pennsylvania State University. Chadwick was awarded an honorary doctorate from the University of Gothenburg in 2003.

She taught at San Francisco State University in the school of art starting in 1978, and became a professor emerita in 2009. Additionally she taught at Massachusetts Institute of Technology, Stanford University and University of California, Berkeley.

In 2010–2011 she was a Fellow at the Radcliffe Institute for Advanced Studies at Harvard University, where she worked on In the Company of Women: Female Sexuality and Empowerment in the Surrealist World focusing on surrealist women artists of the 1930s and 1940s.

Chadwick was the second wife of artist Robert Bechtle, until his death in 2020.

Chadwick died of Alzheimer's disease on August 6, 2026, at the age of 83.

== Publications ==
In addition to Women, Art and Society (1990), Chadwick published Leonora Carrington: la realidad de la imaginacion; Women Artists and the Surrealist Movement; Myth in Surrealist Painting; Amazons in the Drawing Room: The Art of Romaine Brooks; and contributed to the book authored by Liz Rideal, Mirror Images: Women Surrealism, and Self-Representation. Chadwick edited with Isabelle de Courtivron, Significant Others: Creativity and Intimate Partnership; and with Tirza True Latimer edited The Modern Woman Revisited: Paris between the Wars. Her only novel, 1998's Framed, was a work of historical crime fiction.

=== Exhibition catalog essays ===
Chadwick has published exhibition catalog essays about Maria Elena Gonzalez, Mona Hatoum, Nalini Malani, and Sheila Hicks, among others.

== Honors and awards ==
Chadwick received many awards and honors including serving as a fellow at the Sterling and Francine Clark Art Institute (2002); the Forum for Advanced Studies in Arts, Languages and Theology at Uppsala University, and a fellowship/residency from the Radcliffe Institute at Harvard University (2010–2011). In 1999 she was given the Award of Distinction by the National Council of Arts Administrators.

== Publications ==
- Chadwick, Whitney (1985). Women Artists and the Surrealist Movement. Little, Brown and Company. ISBN 9780821215999.
- Chadwick, Whitney (1990). Women, Art and Society. New York City, NY: Thames and Hudson.
- Chadwick, Whitney; De Courtivron, Isabelle, eds. (1993). Significant Others: Creativity & Intimate Partnership. Thames & Hudson. ISBN 978-0500015667.
- Chadwick, Whitney; Carrington, Leonora (1994). Leonora Carrington: la realidad de la imaginacion (in Spanish). México, D.F.: Consejo Nacional para la Cultura y las Artes. ISBN 9789682964282.
- Chadwick, Whitney (1998). Framed. Macmillan. ISBN 9780333719503.
- Chadwick, Whitney (2017). The Militant Muse: Love, War and the Women of Surrealism. ISBN 9780500239681.

== See also ==
- Women in the art history field
