= Van Gogh and Britain =

2019 art exhibition at Tate Britain

Van Gogh and Britain is an exhibition of Vincent van Gogh's paintings that was hosted by Tate Britain between 27 March and 11 August 2019.

== Exhibition ==
The exhibition was held at Tate Britain between 27 March and 11 August 2019. It covered Van Gogh's impact on British painters and his connection with Britain when he was working as a trainee art dealer in London between 1873 and 1876 - such as with the novels of Charles Dickens and George Eliot, as well as paintings by John Constable and John Everett Millais. It also covered British artists inspired by Van Gogh, including Francis Bacon, David Bomberg and the Camden Town Group.

The museum's previous Van Gogh exhibition took place in 1947, which lasted 5 weeks with over 157,000 visitors, including the Queen, and was sponsored by the Arts Council of Great Britain. The attendance of the exhibition was so high that the Tate subsequently requested reimbursement for 3 years worth of wear-and-tear on its flooring during the 5 weeks of the exhibition from the Arts Council. Half of the visitors were during the weekend, when exhibition entry was free, while the other half attended during the week, paying a shilling each, totaling £3,000.

Entrance to the exhibition cost £22, with a concession rate of £20.

== Paintings in the exhibition ==
Image	Title	Year	Collection
	At Eternity's Gate	1890	Kröller-Müller Museum
	A Pair of Shoes	1886	Van Gogh Museum
	Prisoners Exercising	1890	Pushkin Museum of Fine Arts
	Starry Night Over the Rhone	1887	Musée d'Orsay
	Self Portrait	1889	National Gallery of Art
	L'Arlésienne	1890	São Paulo Museum of Art
	Sunflowers	1888	National Gallery
