= Nicola Benedetti =

Scottish violinist (born 1987)

Nicola Benedetti CBE
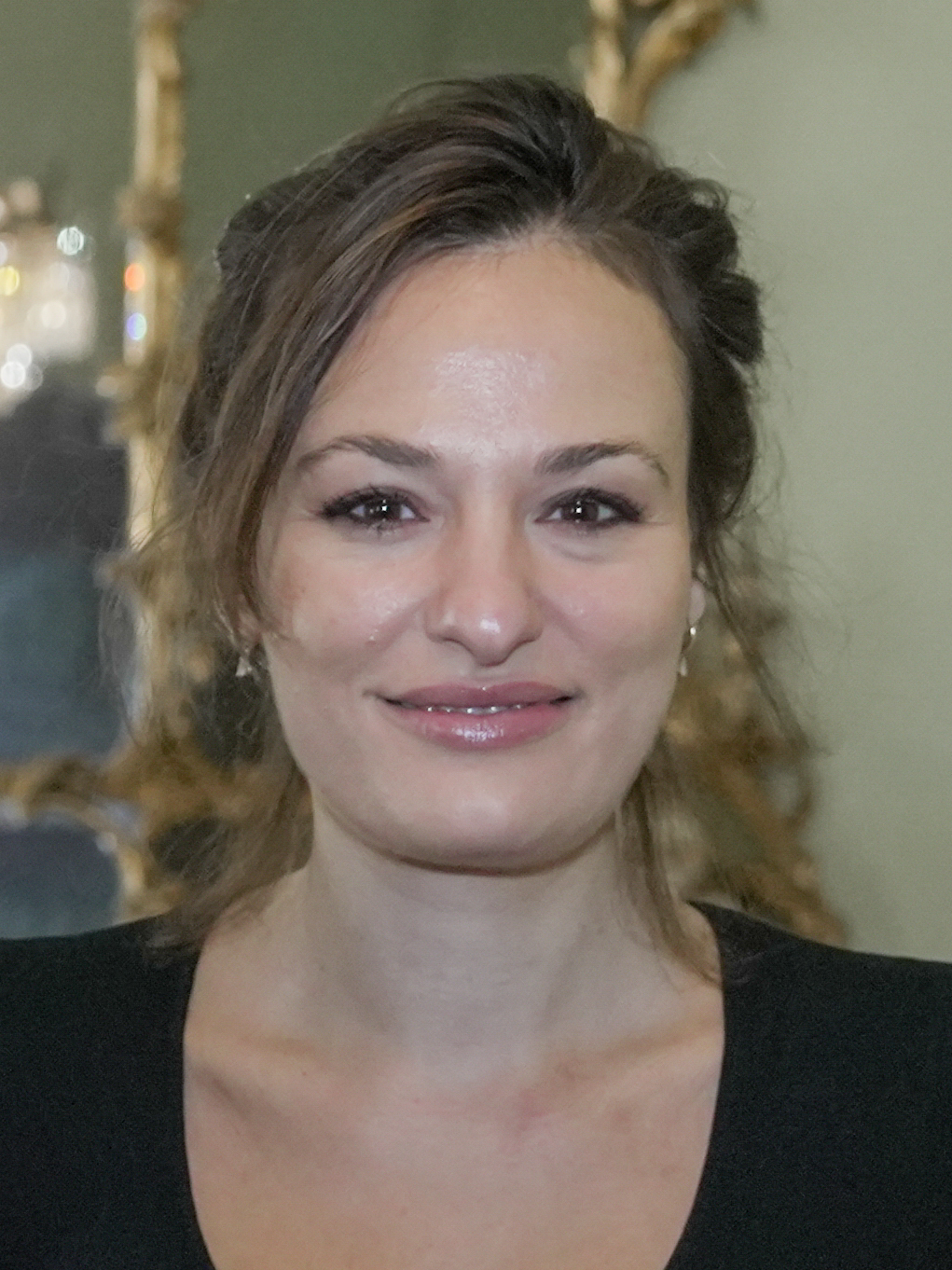
- Benedetti in 2024

Background information
- Born: Nicola Joy Nadia Benedetti; 20 July 1987 (age 39); Irvine, North Ayrshire, Scotland
- Genre: Classical
- Instrument: Violin
- Years active: 1995–present
- Labels: Deutsche Grammophon/Universal Classics; Decca/Universal Classics
- Member of: The Benedetti Elschenbroich Grynyuk Trio
- Spouse: Wynton Marsalis (m. 2024)
- Website: www.nicolabenedetti.co.uk

Nicola Joy Nadia Benedetti CBE (born 20 July 1987) is a Scottish classical violinist and festival director. Her ability was recognised when she was a child, including the award of BBC Young Musician of the Year when she was 16. She works with orchestras in Europe and America as well as with Alexei Grynyuk, her regular pianist. Since 2012, she has played the Gariel Stradivarius violin.

In 2019, Benedetti founded the music education charity The Benedetti Foundation and became the first woman to lead the Edinburgh International Festival when she was made Festival Director on 1 October 2022.

== Early life and education ==
Benedetti was born in West Kilbride, North Ayrshire, Scotland, to an Italian father and an Italian-Scottish mother. She has an older sister, Stephanie, who is also a violinist and a member of the pop group Clean Bandit.

Benedetti started to play the violin aged four with lessons from Brenda Smith. At eight, she became the leader of the National Children's Orchestra of Great Britain. By the age of nine, she had already passed the eight grades of musical examinations while attending the independent Wellington School, Ayr, and, in September 1997, began to study at the Yehudi Menuhin School for young musicians under Lord Menuhin and Natasha Boyarskaya in rural Surrey, England. At the end of her first year (1998), she played solo in the school's annual concert at Wigmore Hall, and performed in London and Paris as a soloist in Bach's Double Violin Concerto with Alina Ibragimova. She played in a memorial concert at Westminster Abbey celebrating the life and work of Yehudi Menuhin. In 2000, she competed in the Menuhin Competition as a junior competitor.

== Career ==
In 1999, Benedetti performed for the anniversary celebrations at Holyrood Palace with the National Youth Orchestra of Scotland. In 2000, Benedetti performed with the Royal Scottish National Orchestra and the Scottish Opera. Subsequent performances followed with the City of London Sinfonia, the Royal Philharmonic Orchestra, Scottish Opera, Scottish Chamber Orchestra, Royal Scottish National Orchestra, etc.

In August 2002, Benedetti won the UK's Brilliant Prodigy Competition, broadcast by Carlton Television. She left the Menuhin School shortly after and, at the age of 15, began studying privately with Maciej Rakowski, the former leader of the English Chamber Orchestra. In spring 2003, Benedetti, invited as a soloist by the London Symphony Orchestra, participated in the recording of the DVD titled Barbie of Swan Lake at Abbey Road Studios. In October 2003, as the extra feature on this DVD, "Playing With Passion" was filmed and released by Mattel. BBC Scotland, using this DVD, created a documentary on Benedetti, which was broadcast on television in the UK in March 2004.

In May 2004, two months before her 17th birthday, Benedetti won the BBC Young Musician of the Year competition, performing Karol Szymanowski's First Violin Concerto in the final at the Usher Hall in Edinburgh, with the BBC Scottish Symphony Orchestra. As a result, she came first in the music section of the Top Scot award in December 2005, at the age of 18. The Times reported that Benedetti was snubbed by Jack McConnell, the then First Minister of Scotland, who thought that there was insufficient public interest to merit a personal congratulatory message. In response to a public and political outcry, McConnell telephoned Benedetti to acknowledge her success.

In September 2012, Benedetti performed at the Last Night of the Proms, playing Violin Concerto No. 1 by Max Bruch. That same year, Benedetti was lent the 1717 "Gariel" Stradivarius by London banker and London Symphony Orchestra Board member Jonathan Moulds.

Apart from solo performances, Benedetti performs in a trio with the German cellist Leonard Elschenbroich and the British-Ukrainian pianist Alexei Grynyuk.

Benedetti was chosen as the subject for the winner of the Sky Arts Portrait Artist of the Year 2021, Calum Stevenson, and this portrait now hangs in the Scottish National Portrait Gallery.

Benedetti is represented by Charlotte Lee at Primo Artists.

=== Festival director ===
In October 2022, Benedetti was appointed director of the Edinburgh International Festival, the first woman and the fist native Scot to hold the post. The appointment was for a period of four years, but in November 2026 she announced plans to remain in the post for a further two years, up to and including the 2029 festival.

== Honours and awards ==
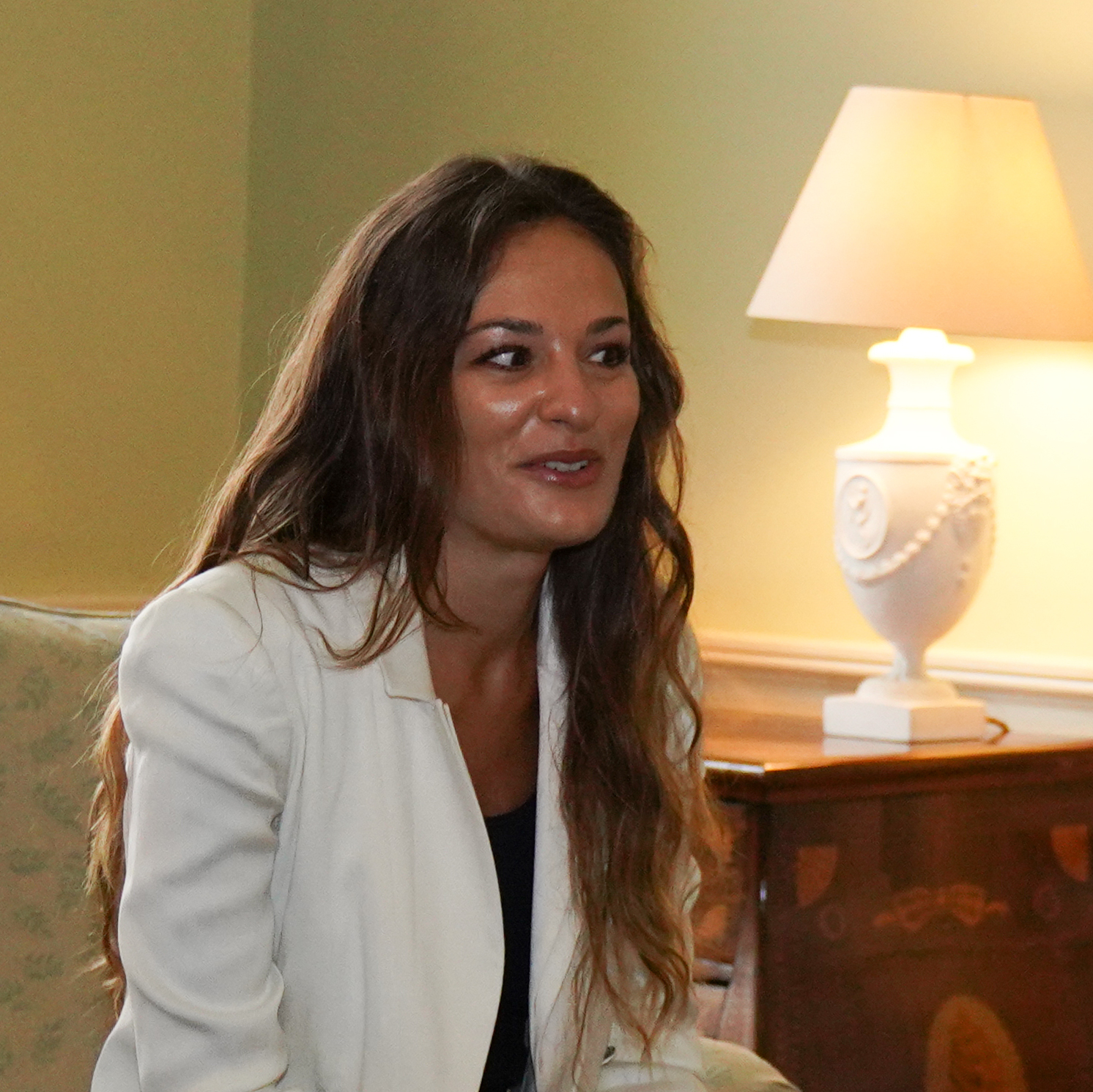
Benedetti in August 2022 while being received by the First Minister of Scotland

=== Official honours ===
Benedetti was appointed Member of the Order of the British Empire (MBE) in the 2013 New Year's Honours "For services to Music and to charity", In May 2017, she was presented with the Queen's Medal for Music, the youngest of the twelve people to receive the award since it was established in 2005. She was appointed Commander of the Order of the British Empire (CBE) in the 2019 New Year Honours, "For services to Music".

=== Honorary degrees ===
Benedetti was awarded honorary doctorates from Glasgow Caledonian University in November 2007 and from Heriot-Watt University in 2010; she was also awarded honorary degrees from the University of Edinburgh in November 2011 and from the University of Leicester in July 2013. She was awarded an honorary degree from the University of York in August 2020.

=== Other honours and awards ===
In 2015, Benedetti was listed as one of BBC's 100 Women.

Benedetti was elected an honorary fellow of the Royal Society of Edinburgh in March 2017. In 2019 she was given the annual Royal Medal award by the Royal Society of Edinburgh for improving the lives of deprived Scottish children through Sistema Scotland and the Big Noise Orchestras.

In 2020, Benedetti won the Grammy for best classical instrumental solo for Marsalis: Violin Concerto; Fiddle Dance Suite. She was awarded the 2021 ISM Distinguished Musician Award. In 2022, she was appointed honorary president of the Royal Conservatoire of Scotland (RCS).

Benedetti received the 2023 Edinburgh Award, which is given to individuals who have made an important contribution to the city and brought it to national and international attention. The award was given in recognition of her work as director of the Edinburgh International Festival.

== Personal life ==
Benedetti was in a relationship with German cellist Leonard Elschenbroich, whom she met at the Yehudi Menuhin School of Music. Although that relationship has ended, they continue to perform together and are good friends. In March 2024, Benedetti announced that she was pregnant with her first child. In July 2025, an article in The Daily Telegraph confirmed that she is married to Wynton Marsalis, whom she met when she was 17 and he was 42, and that he is the father of her daughter, Elise.

== Discography ==
=== Albums ===
Title	Details	Peak chart positions	
Title	Details	UK	UK Classical
Szymanowski: Violin Concerto No. 1	Released: 1 June 2005; Label: Deutsche Grammophon; Formats: Digital download, CD	—	1
Mendelssohn: Violin Concerto Includes Mozart's Adagio for Violin and Orchestra, Schubert's Serenade and Ave Maria, and James MacMillan's From Ayrshire.	Released: 15 May 2006; Label: Deutsche Grammophon; Formats: Digital download, CD	—	2
Vaughan Williams and Tavener	Released: 24 September 2007; Label: Universal Classics and Jazz; Formats: Digital download, CD	—	—
Fantasie "The Lark Ascending" and other popular selections	Released: 7 September 2009; Label: Decca Records; Formats: Digital download, CD	—	1
Tchaikovsky & Bruch: Violin Concertos	Released: 8 October 2010; Label: Deutsche Grammophon; Formats: Digital download, CD	—	—
Italia	Released: 20 February 2011; Label: Decca Records; Formats: Digital download, CD	—	—
The Silver Violin	Released: 24 August 2012; Label: Decca Records; Formats: Digital download, CD	32	—
My First Decade	Released: 20 September 2013; Label: Decca Records; Formats: Digital download, CD	—	—
Homecoming – A Scottish Fantasy	Released: 4 July 2014; Label: Decca Records; Formats: Digital download, CD	19	1
Marsalis: Violin Concerto; Fiddle Dance Suite	Released: 12 July 2019; Label: Decca Records; Formats: Digital download, CD	—	—
Elgar Violin Concerto	Released: 7 August 2020; Label: Decca Records; Formats: Digital download, CD	—	—
Violin Café	Released: 21 November 2025; Label: Decca Classics; Formats: Digital download, CD	—	—
