= Tabbetha Dobbins =

American physicist

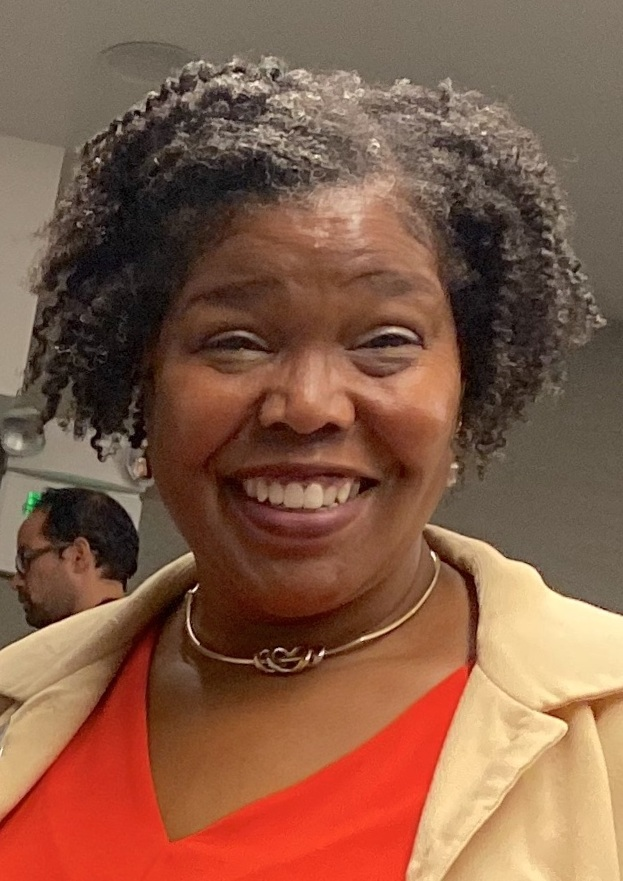
- Tabbetha Dobbins in 2019
- Education: University of Pennsylvania, Lincoln University
- Known for: Characterization of composite materials
- Scientific career
- Workplaces: Rowan University, NIST, Grambling State University, Louisiana Tech University
- Website: Dobbins' group (Rowan University)

Tabbetha A. Dobbins is an American physicist and an associate professor of Physics & Astronomy at Rowan University, where she also serves as the vice president for research. Her research investigates the relationship between structure and dynamics in composite materials using neutron and X-ray scattering with applications to modern engineering problems in carbon nanotubes, gold nanoparticles, the hydrogen fuel economy and polymer self-assembly.

== Education ==
Dobbins received her Doctorate (Ph.D.) degree from The Pennsylvania State University in 2002. She received her Master of Science (M.S.) degree in Materials Science & Engineering from The University of Pennsylvania, and her Bachelor of Science (B.S.) in Physics from Lincoln University.

== Research and career ==
Dobbins was awarded the prestigious National Research Council Post-Doctoral Fellowship to do research at the National Institute of Standards and Technology.

Dobbins held simultaneous faculty positions at Grambling University and Louisiana Tech before becoming a professor at Rowan University.

Dobbins serves as the interim vice president for research and dean of the Graduate School, Division of University Research at Rowan University.

Dobbins is a member of the American Physical Society, the Materials Research Society, ASM International, the National Society of Black Physicists, and she is part of the steering committee for Lightsources for Africa, the Americas, Asia and Middle East Project (LAAMP). Dobbins is a member of the American Institute of Physics (AIP) TEAM-UP Implementation Workshop Organizing Committee (WOC).

In 2020, Dobbins won a National Science Foundation Rapid Response Research (RAPID) grant to study and mitigate the effects of university closures due to COVID-19 on Black undergraduate students of physics.

== Awards and honors ==
In 2007, Dobbins was one of 10 alumni to receive the Penn State University Alumni Association Achievement Award which recognizes extraordinary professional accomplishments of alumni aged 35 and under. She was awarded the National Science Foundation Early Faculty Career Award in 2009 and a National Science Foundation Rapid Response Research (RAPID) grant in 2020.
