= James C. Dobbins =

American Japanologist

James Carter Dobbins (born 1949) is an American academic, Japanologist and professor of religion and East Asian studies at Oberlin College in Oberlin, Ohio.

== Early life ==
In 1971, Dobbins was awarded a Bachelor of Arts degree at Rhodes College. He earned a Master of Arts at Yale University in 1976; and was granted a Ph.D. at Yale in 1984.

== Career ==
Dobbins is the James H Fairchild Professor of East Asian Studies at Oberlin.

== Selected works ==
In a statistical overview derived from writings by and about James Dobbins, OCLC/WorldCat encompasses roughly 8 works in 20+ publications in 3 languages and 700+ library holdings.

- The Emergence of Orthodoxy: a Historical Study of Heresy in the Early Jōdo Shinshū (1984)
- From Inspiration to Institution: The Rise of Sectarian Identity in Jōdo shinshū (1986)
- Jōdo Shinshū: Shin Buddhism in Medieval Japan (1989)
- 恵信尼の書簡: 仏教に生きた中世の女性 (1989)
- The Legacy of Kuroda Toshio (1996)
- Letters of the Nun Eshinni: Images of Pure Land Buddhism in Medieval Japan (2004)

Articles

- "Women's Birth in Pure Land as Women: Intimations from the Letters of Eshinni," The Eastern Buddhist, Vol. 28, No. 1 (Spring 1995), pp. 108–22.
- "The Biography of Shinran: Apotheosis of a Japanese Buddhist Visionary," History of Religions, Vol. 30, No. 2 (November 1990), pp. 179–96.
- "From Inspiration to Institution: The Rise of Sectarian Identity in Jodo Shinsho," Monumenta Nipponica, Vol. 41, No. 3 (Autumn 1986), pp. 330–43.
