= Fine Art Society =

Art dealers based in London and Edinburgh

Coordinates: 51.511269°N 0.143822°W

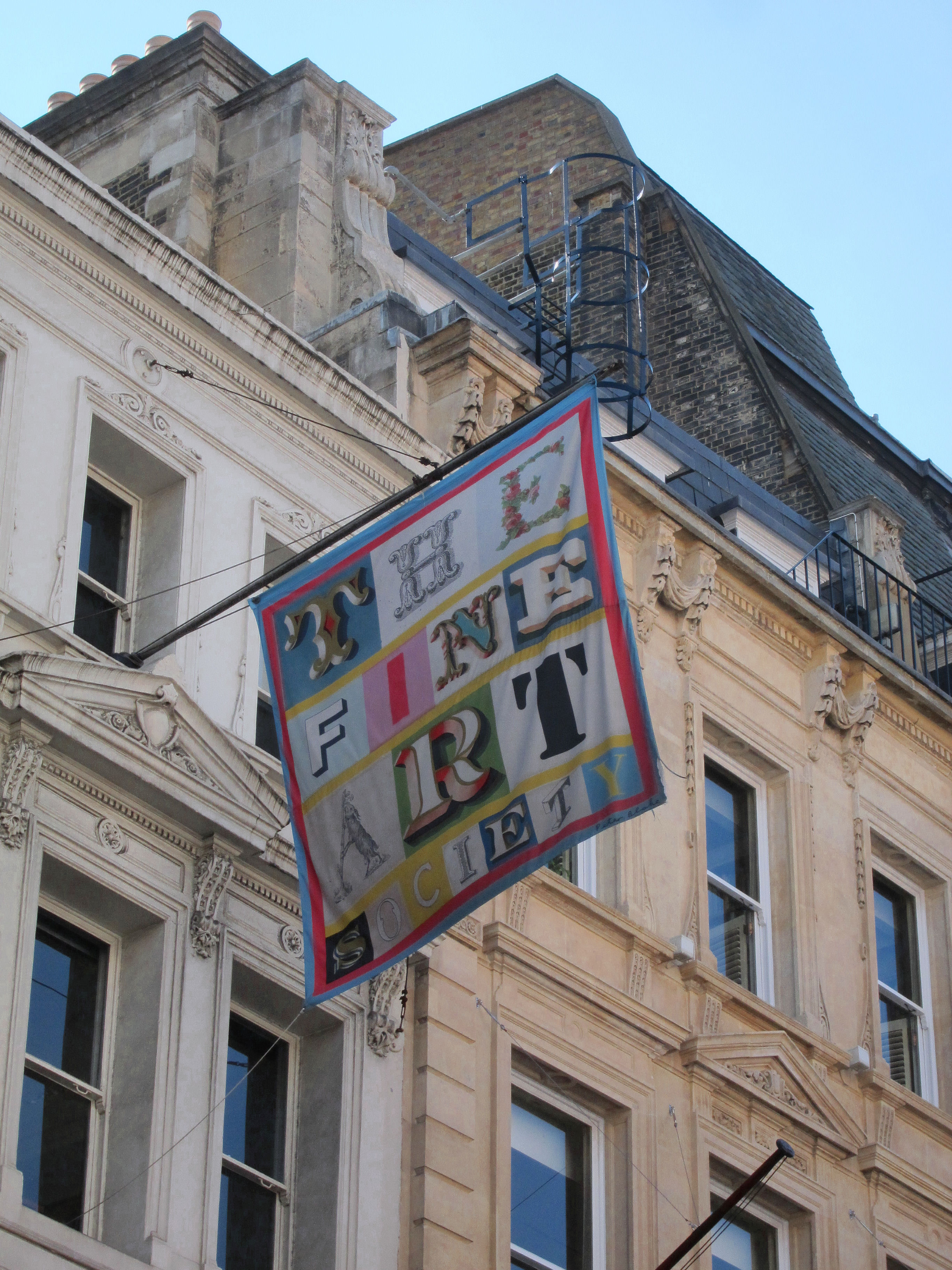
The Fine Art Society, London

The Fine Art Society is a gallery based in both London and in Edinburgh's New Town (originally Bourne Fine Art, established 1978). The New Bond Street, London gallery closed its doors in August 2018 after being occupied by The Fine Art Society since February 1876, the entrance façade of which was designed in 1881 by Edward William Godwin (1833–1886).

== History ==
Founded in 1876 by a group of like-minded men led by William Longman of the publishing family, Marcus Bourne Huish (1843–1904), lawyer, editor, writer and collector, who became the first managing director while at the same time editing The Art Journal; and Archibald Stuart-Wortley MP. The gallery, first managed by Ernest Brown (later founder of Leicester Galleries) has for many years largely concentrated on British art and design from 1600 to the present day; with the Edinburgh premises specialising in Scottish art of the same period. The Edinburgh branch of the company is directed by Emily Walsh. The chairmen were all drawn from the Longman family until the death of Mark Longman in 1972. Since then only Lord Macfarlane of Bearsden KT (until 1998), Sir Angus Grossart (until 2016) and Robin Holland-Martin (current) have held the position. Only seven people have held the position of managing director in the past 139 years, the last being Pippa Stockdale.

The Fine Art Society has taken part in key international art fairs over the years, most notably at TEFAF Maastricht, Masterpiece, London, Frieze Masters, London and at the London Original Print Fair, whose founder and chairman, Gordon Cooke, is also the society's 19th and 20th century prints specialist. The society has also exhibited in art fairs in New York, Miami, Hong Kong, Paris and Dubai.

== Exhibitions ==
The gallery is also known as the pioneer of the one-man exhibition, most famously that of James McNeill Whistler's First Venice Set of etchings in December 1880; the gallery having sent Whistler to Venice in 1879 in part to enable him to escape from the issues following his libel action against John Ruskin. The commission was for Whistler to travel to Venice for three months to create a series of twelve etchings. Beguiled by the city, he stayed for fourteen months and completed approximately fifty etchings. Venice also inspired Whistler to make some hundred works in pastel, of which 53 were shown in the Venice Pastels exhibition in 1881. During Whistler's absence in Venice, the gallery showed his antagonist John Ruskin's private Collection of Watercolours by J. M. W. Turner, and ran a subscription to pay for Ruskin's legal costs: a supreme exhibition of political sleight of hand. Other living exhibitors at the London premises included Sir John Everett Millais, John Singer Sargent, Burne-Jones, Claude Hayes, Frank Brangwyn, Walter Richard Sickert, Walter Crane, George Washington Lambert, Henry Charles Brewer and Joseph Southall, and more recently Leonard Rosoman, Emma Sargent, Emily Young, John Byrne, Alexander Stoddart and Geoffrey Clarke. The many memorial exhibitions held include one for Henry George Hine in 1895, and for Lady Alma Tadema in 1910.

A Contemporary gallery was created in 2005, originally managed by Toby Clarke, subsequently by Kate Bryan, and most recently by Lee Cavaliere. Sara Terzi is now the Contemporary art specialist at the gallery. The Contemporary team have embraced the nineteenth and twentieth century heritage of the gallery and increased cross-cultural links, particularly in Asia, Australia and the US. Among the artists shown are Chris Levine, Angela Palmer, Annie Kevans, Jacky Tsai and Bartholomew Beal.

In October 2014 The Fine Art Society Contemporary staged the first exhibition to be held at the gallery across all 5 floors, 'What Marcel Duchamp Taught Me.' The exhibition featured artwork by 50 contemporary global artists including Sir Peter Blake, Cornelia Parker, Gavin Turk, Chris Levine, Conrad Shawcross, Keith Tyson, Michael Craig-Martin, Jonathan Yeo, Joseph Kosuth, Idris Khan, Annie Kevans and Charming Baker. The exhibition curated by Kate Bryan was one of the most successful in the history of the gallery and marked 100 years since Marcel Duchamp created the readymade.
