= Tai-Shan Schierenberg =

English painter

Tai-Shan Schierenberg (born 1962) is a British portrait painter based in London. He was the joint winner of the 1989 BP Portrait Award, is the Founder of the Painting department at Art Academy London, and is a Sky Arts presenter.

== Early life and career ==
Schierenberg was born in England in 1962, the eldest of three sons, to a Chinese-Malaysian mother and a German father who was a painter. As a child, Tai-Shan spent the first years of his life with his grandparents in Malaysia, but was eventually returned to his London-based parents for primary school. He also spent some time in Argentina studying art.

Being taken on frequent visits to the London museums or art galleries made Tai-Shan familiar with painting of all realms and ages, while drawing soon became his favourite activity. After travels to Greece and Turkey, the family settled in the Black Forest and, in pursuit of a more ecologically-centred life, did some subsistence farming. Tai-Shan attended a Jesuit-run grammar school nearby. He started painting in oils in his mid-teens.

At the age of 17, with his secondary education completed, he left home, travelled to Frankfurt and Amsterdam, and spent time in Paris, drawing from life at the Académie de la Grande Chaumière.

Schierenberg eventually returned to London where he has lived ever since. He applied to, and was accepted by, St. Martin's and, in due course, Slade School of Art for postgraduate studies, which he finished in 1987.

In 1989 he won joint first prize in the National Portrait Gallery's John Player Portrait Award. As part of the prize he was commissioned to paint the portrait of playwright John Mortimer for the Gallery's collection. The National Portrait Gallery also holds his portraits of Lord Carrington from 1994, Lord Sainsbury 2002 and, most recently Seamus Heaney from 2004. He has also executed the commission for a double portrait of Queen Elizabeth II and the Duke of Edinburgh. His paintings can be seen at Flowers East in Hackney.

Since 2013 he has been a judge on the Sky Arts television programme Artist of the Year.

During the football season Schierenberg gained "unprecedented access" to West Bromwich Albion Football Club for the production of a Channel 4 documentary called The Football Club, which is part of the channel's ‘Artist in Residence’ series. Schierenberg sought "to understand what it was about the game that makes it so compelling". Whilst he began the project as a football cynic, he emerged as a fan of the club.

== Bibliography ==
- Packer, W. (2005) Tai-Shan Schierenberg. Momentum, London.
